= Leeds City Council elections =

One third of Leeds City Council in the City of Leeds, West Yorkshire, England is elected each year, followed by no election in one year out of every four years. A total of 99 councillors have been elected from 33 electoral wards across Leeds since 1980.

== Political control ==
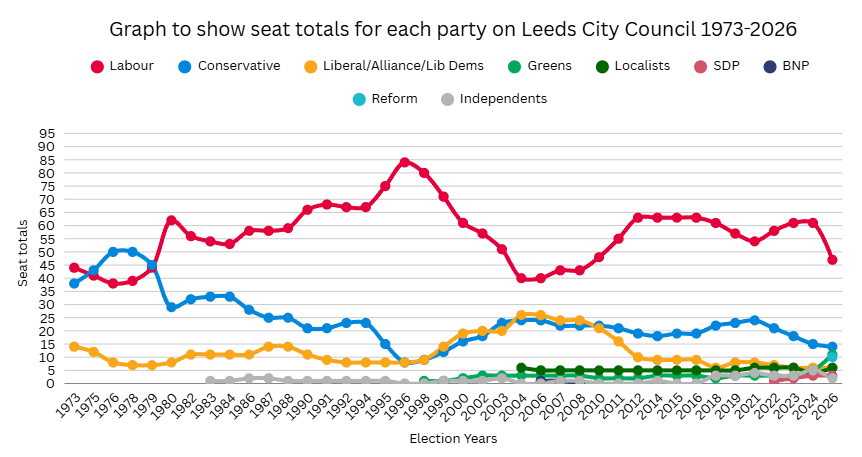
Seat totals, 1973–2026

From 1889 until 1974 Leeds was a county borough, independent from any county council. Under the Local Government Act 1972 it had its territory enlarged and became a metropolitan borough, with West Yorkshire County Council providing county-level services. The first election to the reconstituted city council was held in 1973, initially operating as a shadow authority before coming into its revised powers on 1 April 1974. West Yorkshire County Council was abolished in 1986 and Leeds became a unitary authority. Political control of the council since 1974 has been held by the following parties:

Party in control	Years
No overall control	1974–1976
Conservative	1976–1979
No overall control	1979–1980
Labour	1980–2004
No overall control	2004–2011
Labour	2011–2026
No overall control	2026–present

=== Leadership ===
The first leader of the reformed council in 1974, Albert King, had been the last leader of the old county borough council. The leaders of the council since 1974 have been:

Councillor	Party	From	To
Albert King	Labour	1974	1975
Irwin Bellow	Conservative	1975	1979
Peter Sparling	Conservative	1979	1980
George Mudie	Labour	1980	1989
Jon Trickett	Labour	1989	1996
Brian Walker	Labour	1996	May 2003
Keith Wakefield	Labour	2003	28 June 2004
Mark Harris	Liberal Democrats	28 June 2004	30 November 2004
Andrew Carter	Conservative	1 December 2004	23 May 2005
Mark Harris	Liberal Democrats	24 May 2005	30 November 2005
Andrew Carter	Conservative	1 December 2005	22 May 2006
Mark Harris	Liberal Democrats	23 May 2006	30 November 2006
Andrew Carter	Conservative	1 December 2006	21 May 2007
Mark Harris	Liberal Democrats	24 May 2007	30 November 2007
Andrew Carter	Conservative	1 December 2007	22 May 2008
Richard Brett	Liberal Democrats	22 May 2008	30 November 2008
Andrew Carter	Conservative	1 December 2008	21 May 2009
Richard Brett	Liberal Democrats	21 May 2009	30 November 2009
Andrew Carter	Conservative	1 December 2009	27 May 2010
Keith Wakefield	Labour	27 May 2010	21 May 2015
Judith Blake	Labour	21 May 2015	24 February 2021
James Lewis	Labour	24 February 2021	incumbent

From 2004 until 2010 a coalition agreement between the Conservatives and Liberal Democrats saw the leadership formally alternate every six months between their party leaders, an arrangement was sometimes described as being joint leaders.

== Council elections ==
Summary of the council composition after council elections, click on the year for full details of each election. Boundary changes took place for the 1980 election which increased the number of seats by 3, leading to the whole council being elected in that year. Further boundary changes made in 2004 again required the full council to be elected.

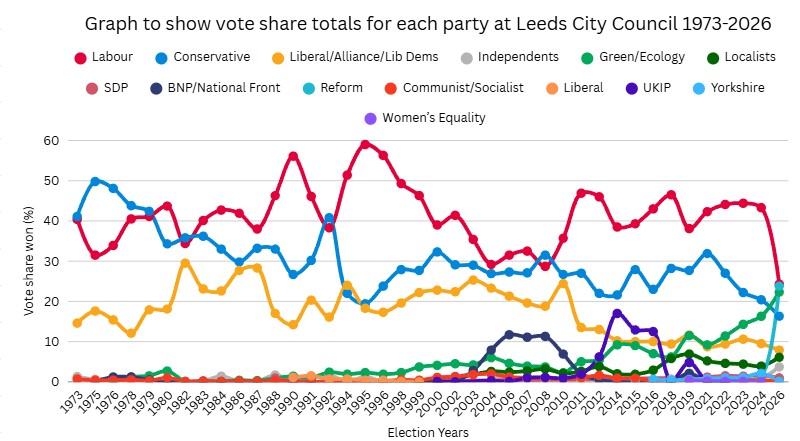
Popular vote shares, 1973–2026

Year	Labour	Conservative	Liberal Democrats	Independent	Greens	Morley Borough Independents	SDP	BNP
1973	44	38	14	0	0	0	0	0
1975	41	43	12	0	0	0	0	0
1976	38	50	8	0	0	0	0	0
1978	39	50	7	0	0	0	0	0
1979	44	45	7	0	0	0	0	0
1980	62	29	8	0	0	0	0	0
1982	56	32	11	0	0	0	0	0
1983	54	33	11	1	0	0	0	0
1984	53	33	12	1	0	0	0	0
1986	58	28	11	2	0	0	0	0
1987	58	25	14	2	0	0	0	0
1988	59	25	14	1	0	0	0	0
1990	66	21	11	1	0	0	0	0
1991	68	21	9	1	0	0	0	0
1992	67	23	8	1	0	0	0	0
1994	67	23	8	1	0	0	0	0
1995	75	15	8	1	0	0	0	0
1996	83	8	8	0	0	0	0	0
1998	80	9	9	0	1	0	0	0
1999	71	12	14	1	1	0	0	0
2000	61	16	19	1	2	0	0	0
2002	57	18	20	1	3	0	0	0
2003	52	22	20	2	3	0	0	0
2004	40	24	26	0	3	6	0	0
2006	40	24	26	0	3	5	0	1
2007	43	22	24	1	3	5	0	1
2008	43	22	24	1	3	5	0	1
2010	48	22	21	0	2	6	0	0
2011	55	21	16	0	2	5	0	0
2012	63	19	10	0	2	5	0	0
2014	63	18	9	1	3	5	0	0
2015	63	19	9	0	3	5	0	0
2016	63	19	9	0	3	5	0	0
2018	61	22	6	3	2	5	0	0
2019	57	23	8	3	3	5	0	0
2021	54	24	8	4	3	6	0	0
2022	58	21	7	3	3	6	1	0
2023	61	18	6	3	3	6	2	0
2024	61	15	6	5	5	4	3	0

== Borough result maps ==
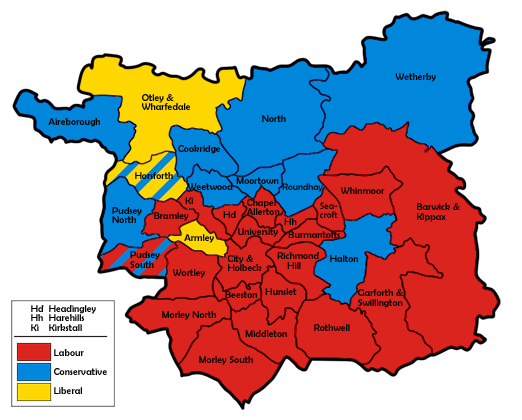
1980 results map, with new ward boundaries

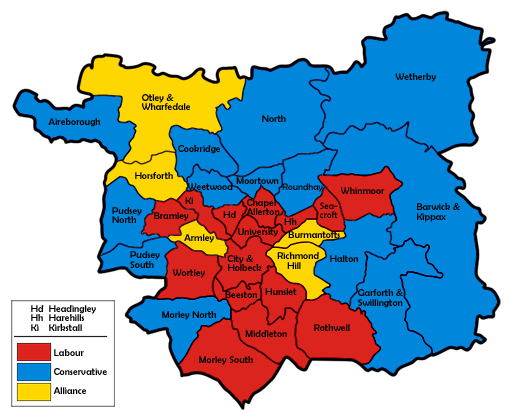
1982 results map

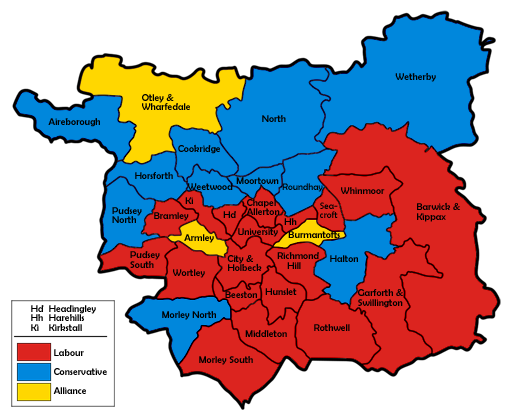
1983 results map

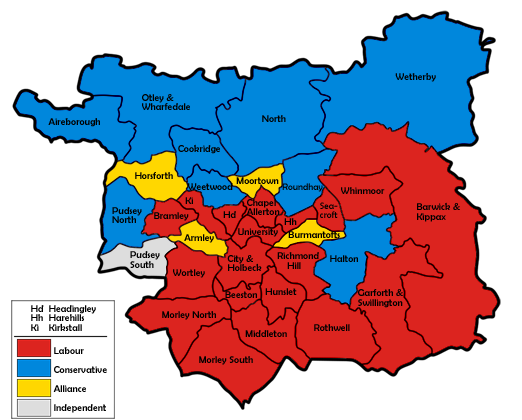
1984 results map

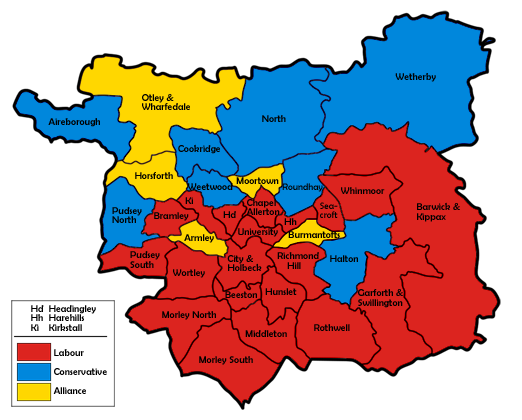
1986 results map

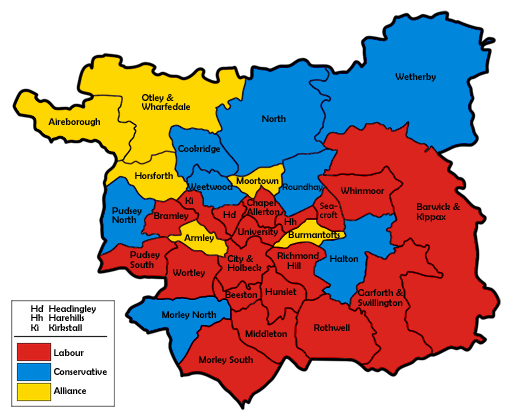
1987 results map

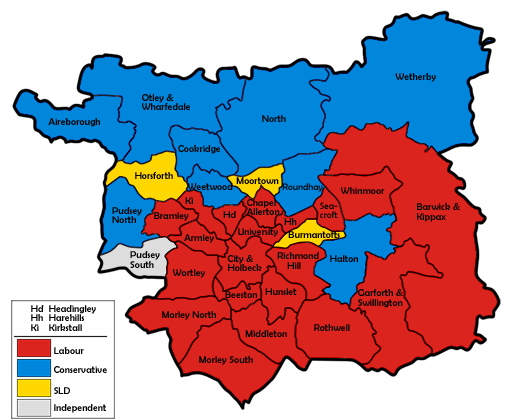
1988 results map

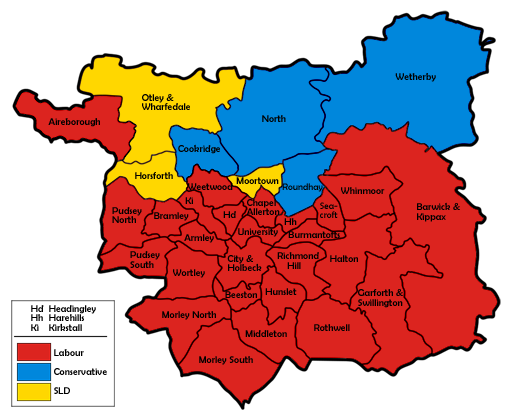
1990 results map

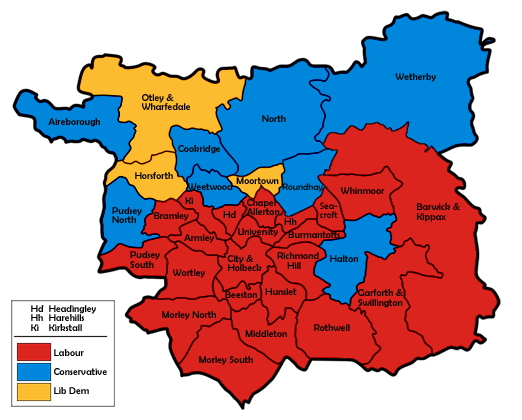
1991 results map

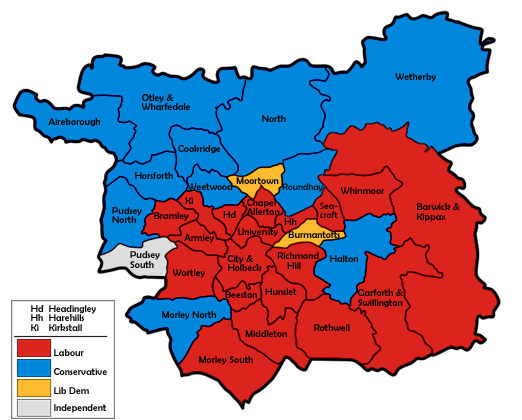
1992 results map

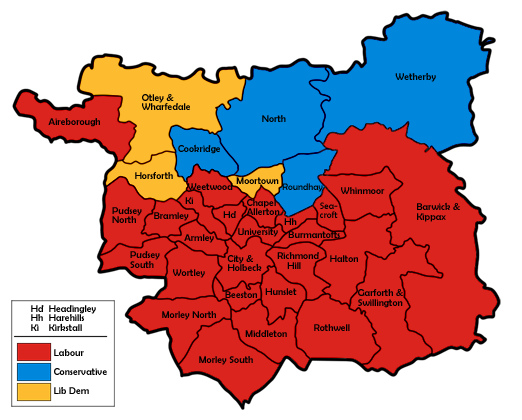
1994 results map

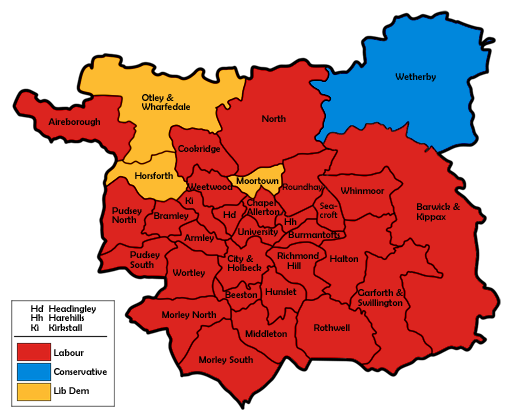
1995 results map

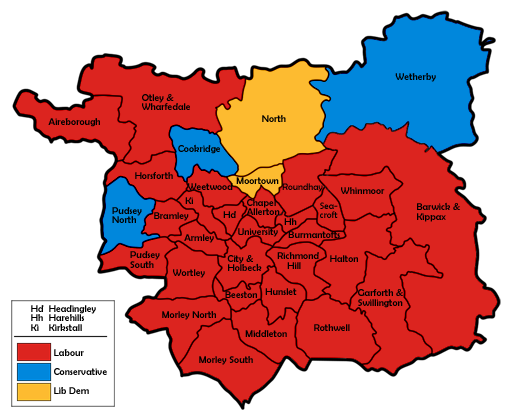
1996 results map

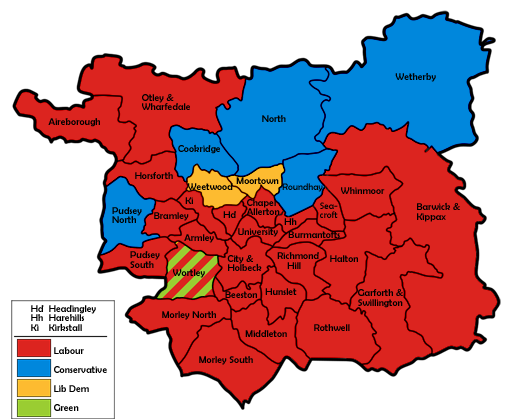
1998 results map, with first Green councillor

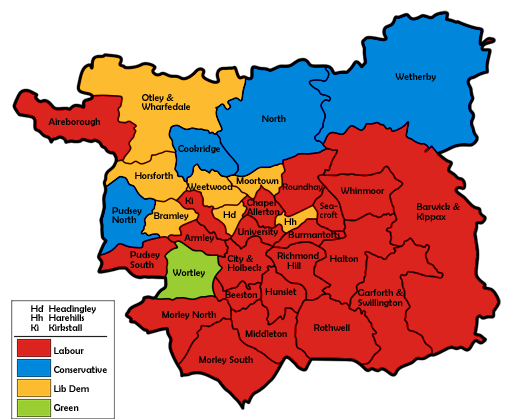
1999 results map

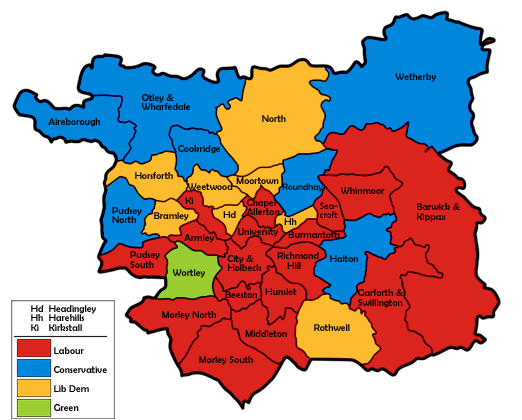
2000 results map

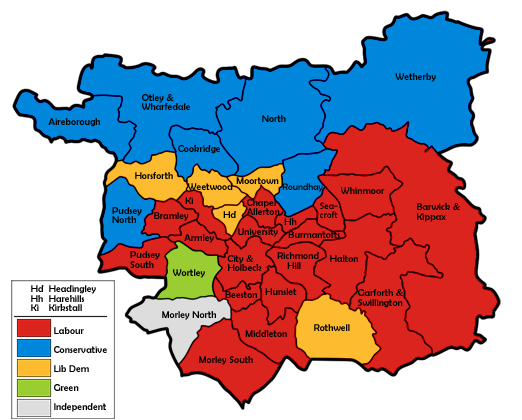
2002 results map

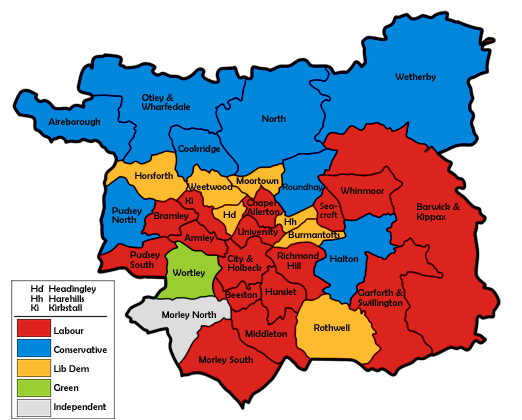
2003 results map

2004 results map, with new ward boundaries

2006 results map

2007 results map

2008 results map

2010 results map

2011 results map

2012 results map

2014 results map

2015 results map

2016 results map

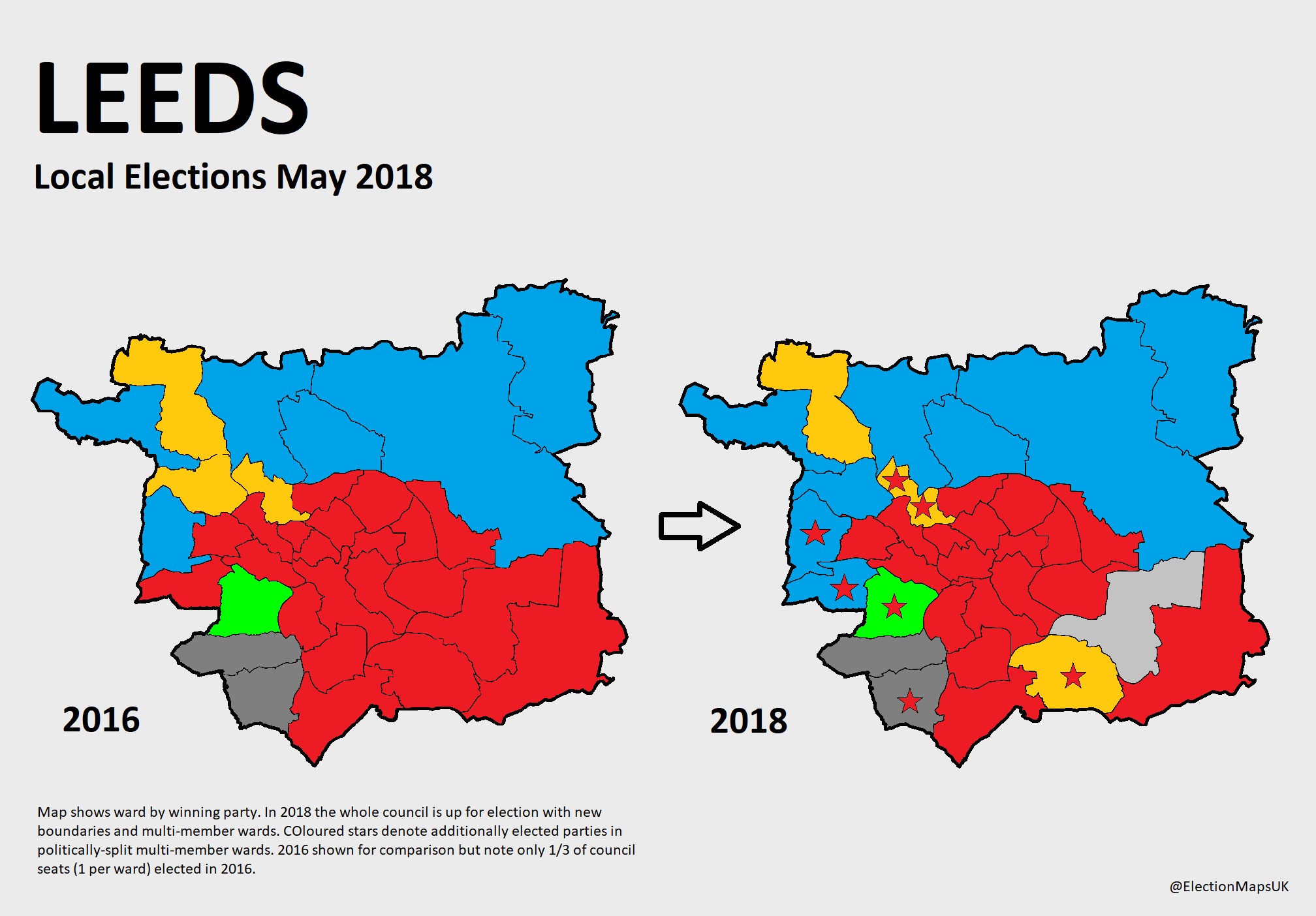
2018 results map, with new ward boundaries

2019 results map

2021 results map

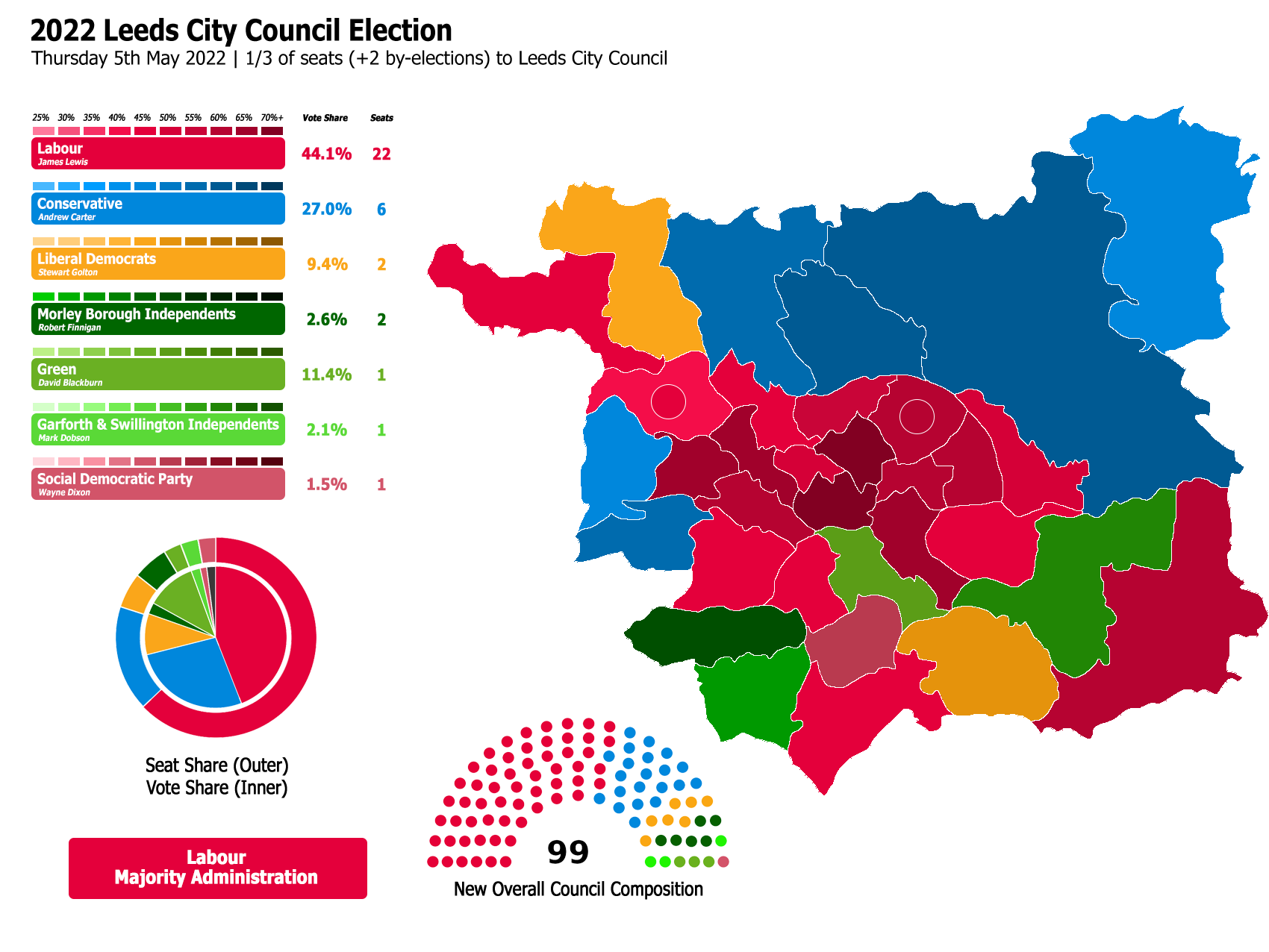
2022 results map

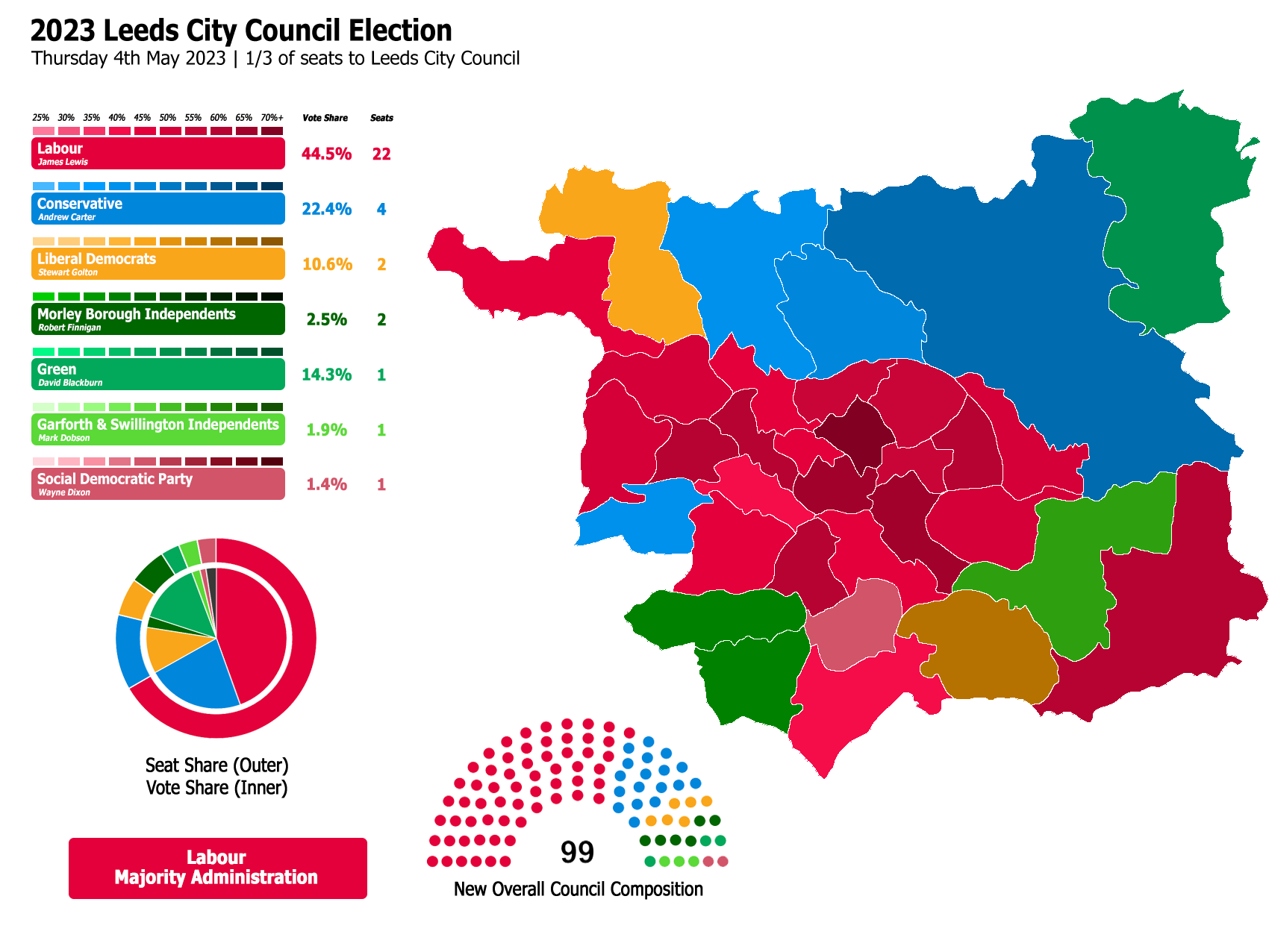
2023 results map

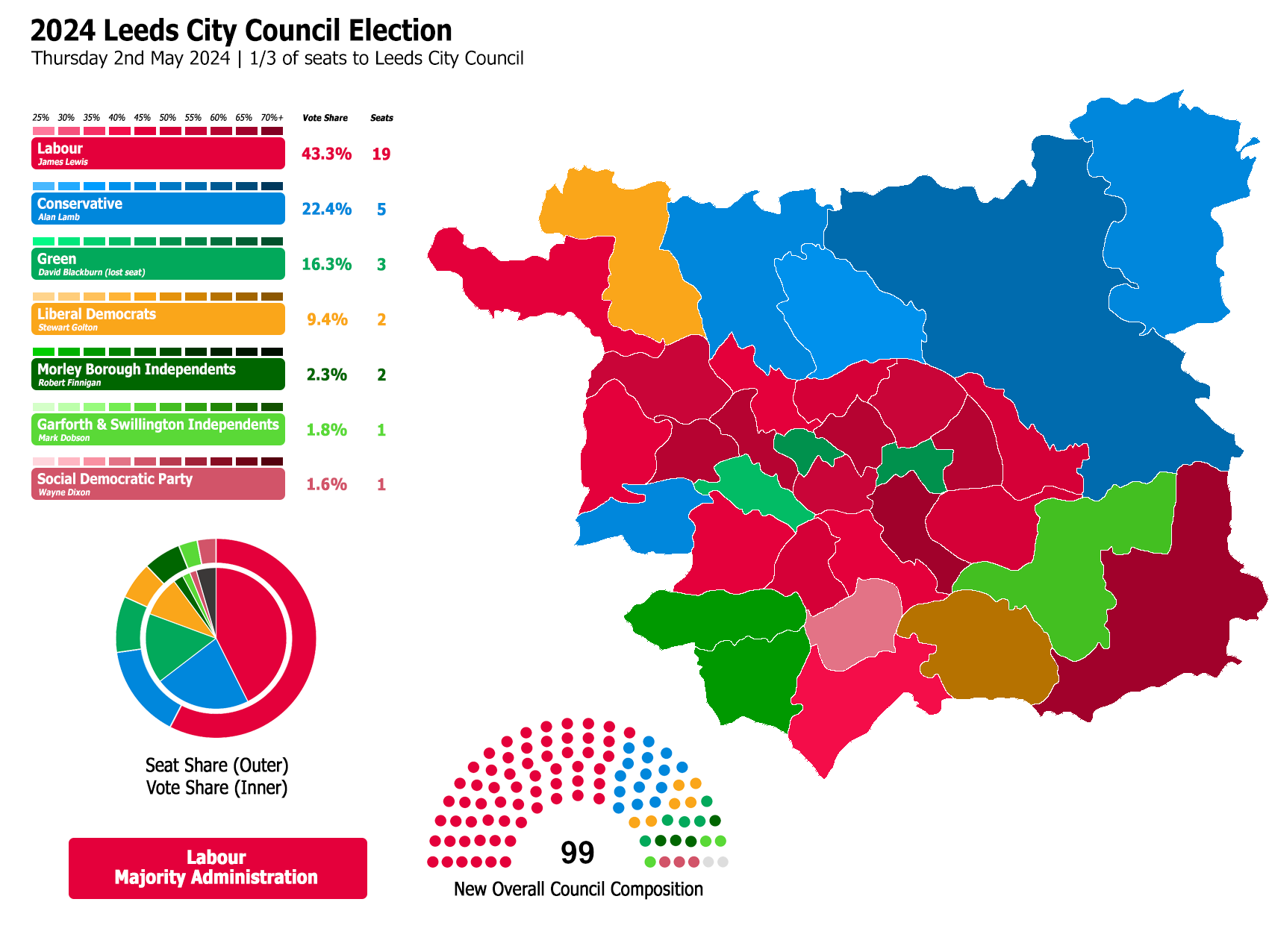
2024 results map

2026 results map

== By-election results ==
Following the death, removal or resignation of an incumbent councillor between council elections, by-elections occur to elect a successor to fill the vacant council seat. The next by-election will take place on 12 June 2025 in Morley South to replace Wyn Kidger.

Ward by-election	Date	Incumbent party	Winning party
Headingley by-election	28 February 1974	Conservative	Conservative
Burley by-election	21 November 1974	Conservative	Labour
Burley by-election	8 January 1975	Labour	Labour
Beeston by-election	27 September 1984	Labour	Labour
Aireborough by-election	18 August 1986	Conservative	Alliance
Armley by-election	8 December 1988	SLD	Labour
Burmantofts by-election	15 June 1989	SLD	Labour
Morley North by-election	15 June 1989	Labour	Labour
City & Holbeck by-election	30 November 1989	Labour	Labour
Wetherby by-election	23 July 1992	Conservative	Conservative
Richmond Hill by-election	26 October 1995	Labour	Labour
Beeston by-election	14 November 1996	Labour	Labour
Headingley by-election	10 July 1997	Labour	Labour
Whinmoor by-election	21 August 1997	Labour	Labour
Bramley by-election	6 August 1998	Labour	Liberal Democrats
Harehills by-election	13 April 2000	Labour	Liberal Democrats
Morley North by-election	7 June 2001	Labour	Labour
University by-election	7 June 2001	Labour	Labour
Moortown by-election	19 July 2001	Liberal Democrats	Liberal Democrats
Headingley by-election	28 July 2005	Liberal Democrats	Liberal Democrats
Farnley & Wortley by-election	18 September 2008	Green	Green
Temple Newsam by-election	2 April 2009	Labour	Conservative
Hyde Park & Woodhouse by-election	18 February 2010	Liberal Democrats	Labour
Guiseley & Rawdon by-election	14 October 2010	Conservative	Conservative
Cross Gates & Whinmoor by-election	2 May 2013	Labour	Labour
Wetherby by-election	12 December 2019	Conservative	Conservative
Farnley & Wortley by-election	10 October 2024	Labour	Green
Morley South by-election	12 June 2025	Morley Borough Independents	Reform
Calverley & Farsley by-election	22 October 2026	Labour	Conservative
