= 2026 Leeds City Council election =

2026 English local government election

- 7 May 2026

36 of 99 seats on Leeds City Council (Note: Including 3 by-elections in Adel and Wharfedale, Morley North and Temple Newsam.) 50 seats needed for a majority
- Registered: 576,656
- Turnout: 41.5% (▲7.3%)
	First party	Second party	Third party
Leader	James Lewis	Trish Smith	Alan Lamb
Party	Labour	Reform	Conservative
Leader's seat	Kippax and Methley	Pudsey	Wetherby
Last election	19 seats, 43.3%	0 seats, 1.3%	5 seats, 20.5%
Seats before	56	2	13
Seats won	9	8	7
Seats after	48 (Note: Seat count includes Jessica Lennox (Cross Gates and Whinmoor), who resigned from the Labour Party in the immediate aftermath of the election.)	10	14
Seat change	▼8	▲8	▲1
Popular vote	62,034	60,445	41,853
Percentage	23.9%	23.3%	16.1%
Swing	▼19.4pp	▲22.0pp	▼4.4pp
	Fourth party	Fifth party	Sixth party
Leader	Penny Stables	Stewart Golton	Wayne Dixon
Party	Green	Liberal Democrats	SDP
Leader's seat	Wetherby	Rothwell	Middleton Park
Last election	3 seats, 16.3%	2 seats, 9.4%	1 seat, 1.6%
Seats before	6	6	3
Seats won	7	2	1
Seats after	11	6	3
Seat change	▲5	Steady	Steady
Popular vote	56,413	20,025	3,270
Percentage	21.7%	7.7%	1.3%
Swing	▲5.4pp	▼1.7pp	▼0.3pp
	Seventh party	Eighth party	Ninth party
Leader	Oliver Newton (retiring)	Mark Dobson	N/A
Party	Morley Borough Independents	Garforth and Swillington Independents	Independent
Leader's seat	Morley South	Garforth and Swillington	N/A
Last election	2 seats, 2.3%	1 seat, 1.8%	0 seats, 0.8%
Seats before	3	3	3
Seats won	1	1	0
Seats after	3	3	1
Seat change	Steady	Steady	▼2
Popular vote	7,364	5,007	2,688
Percentage	2.8%	1.9%	1.0%
Swing	▲0.5pp	▲0.1pp	▲1.3pp
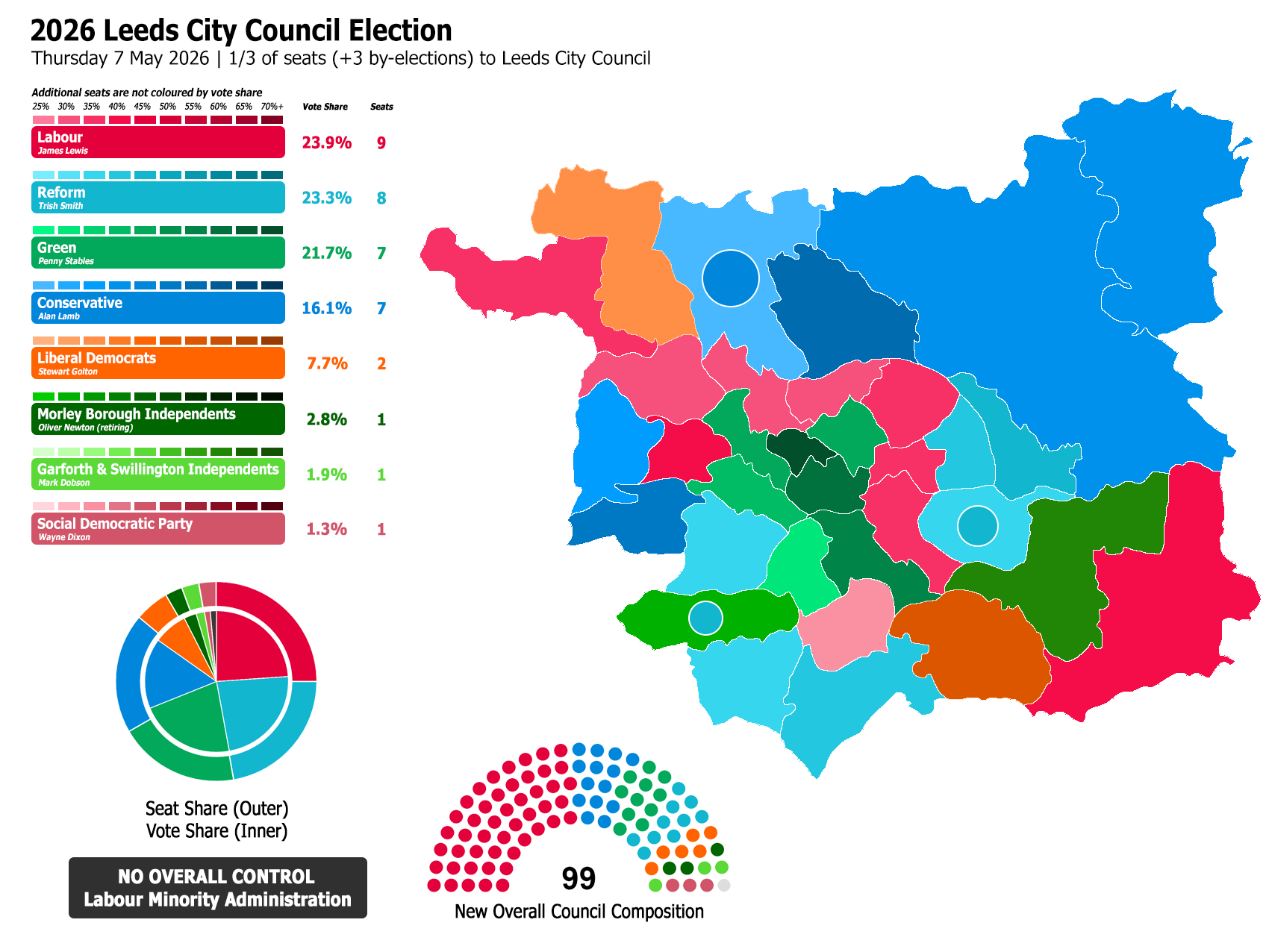
- Results by Ward Map
Leader before election
James Lewis
Labour
Leader after election
James Lewis
Labour
No overall control (Note: Labour minority administration.)

The 2026 Leeds City Council election took place on 7 May 2026 alongside other local elections across the United Kingdom.

Prior to the election, the council was under Labour majority control. At the election, the council went under no overall control. Labour remained the largest party but fell two seats short of a majority. Labour subsequently managed to form a minority administration, with the incumbent leader of the council, James Lewis, being reappointed to the role at the subsequent annual council meeting.

== Electoral system ==
Leeds City Council area is divided into 33 electoral wards. Each ward elects 3 councillors, giving a total of 99 councillors. Councillors are elected for four-year terms using the first-past-the-post system. Elections are held by thirds, with one councillor from each ward elected in each of three consecutive years, followed by a year without council-wide election (or a fallow year). No election was held in 2025.

== Background ==
The Labour Party had held a majority on the council continuously since the 2011 Leeds City Council election.

At the previous election in 2024, the Labour Party received 43.3% of the popular vote and held 61 seats, maintaining its overall majority.

Prior to the 2026 election, Labour’s number of seats had fallen to 56.

The 2026 election was the first scheduled Leeds City Council election since the 2024 general election. Most of the seats had last been contested in 2022. However, owing to subsequent resignations and by-elections, two of the seats were last up for election in 2023 (Note: Robert Finnigan of Morley Borough Independents party's seat in Morley North and Nicole Sharpe of the Labour Party's seat in Temple Newsam.) and another two in 2024. (Note: Caroline Anderson of the Conservative Party's seat in Adel and Wharfedale was last contested in 2024 Leeds City Council Election and David Blackburn of the Green Party's seat in Farnley and Wortley was last contested at the by-election later that year.)

In the run-up to the election, the Labour Party was widely expected to suffer losses amid decline in national opinion polls and the unpopularity of Prime Minister Keir Starmer. In Leeds, Labour faced challenges from the Green Party, particularly in more diverse and student-heavy areas, while Reform UK posed a significant challenge in parts of east Leeds.

== Pre-election projections ==
Right before the election day, the PollCheck projection showed that Labour would lose its majority on the council, falling to 46 seats, with the Greens and Reform UK projected to increase their representation to 15 and 9 seats respectively; the Conservatives were projected to fall to 11 seats, the Liberal Democrats to hold 7, and other parties and independents to hold a combined 11.

== Council composition ==
=== Overall council composition ===
After 2024 election		Before 2026 election		After 2026 election	
Party	Seats	Party	Seats	Party	Seats
Labour	61	Labour	56	Labour	48
Conservative	15	Conservative	13	Conservative	14
Liberal Democrats	6	Liberal Democrats	6	Green	11
Green	5	Green	6	Reform	10
Morley Borough Independents	4	Morley Borough Independents	3	Liberal Democrats	6
Garforth and Swillington Independents	3	Garforth and Swillington Independents	3	Garforth and Swillington Independents	3
SDP	3	SDP	3	Morley Borough Independents	3
Reform	0	Reform	2	SDP	3
Independent	2	Independent	3	Independent	0
Vacant	N/A	Vacant	4	Vacant	N/A
Working majority	23	Working majority	17	Working majority	3 short

=== Composition of seats up for election ===
As elected		Prior to the election		After the election	
Party	Seats	Party	Seats	Party	Seats
Labour	21	Labour	17	Labour	9
Conservative	7	Conservative	6	Reform	8
Morley Borough Independents	3	Green	2	Conservative	7
Liberal Democrats	2	Liberal Democrats	2	Green	7
Garforth and Swillington Independents	1	Garforth and Swillington Independents	1	Liberal Democrats	2
Green	1	Morley Borough Independents	1	Garforth and Swillington Independents	1
SDP	1	SDP	1	Morley Borough Independents	1
Reform	0	Reform	0	SDP	1
Independent	0	Independent	2	Independent	0
Vacant	N/A	Vacant	4	Vacant	N/A

== Incumbents ==
Ward	Incumbent councillor	First elected	Party	Re-standing	Re-elected
Adel & Wharfedale	Barry Anderson	1999	Conservative	No	N/A
Adel & Wharfedale	Vacant (Note: Conservative councillor Caroline Anderson first elected in 2015 resigned in March 2026, leaving the seat vacant until the 2026 election.)	—	n/a	N/A	N/A
Alwoodley	Dan Cohen	2011	Conservative	Yes	Yes
Ardsley & Robin Hood	Karen Renshaw	2004	Labour	No	N/A
Armley	Alice Smart	2014	Labour	No	N/A
Beeston & Holbeck	Annie Maloney	2022	Labour	No	N/A
Bramley & Stanningley	Kevin Ritchie	2014	Labour	Yes	Yes
Burmantofts & Richmond Hill	Luke Farley	2022	Labour	Yes	Yes
Calverley & Farsley	Andrew Carter	1973	Conservative	Yes	Yes
Chapel Allerton	Eileen Taylor	2008	Labour Co-op	Yes	No
Cross Gates & Whinmoor	Pauleen Grahame	2002	Labour	No	N/A
Farnley & Wortley	David Blackburn	1998, 2024 (Note: 10 October 2024 Farnley & Wortley by-election.)	Green	No	N/A
Garforth & Swillington	Mark Dobson	2007	G&SI (Note: Was a Labour councillor until 2017, when left the party to sit as Garforth and Swillington Independents councillor.)	Yes	Yes
Gipton & Harehills	Salma Arif	2016	Labour	Yes	Yes
Guiseley & Rawdon	Eleanor Thomson	2022	Labour	Yes	Yes
Harewood	Matthew Robinson	2010	Conservative	No	N/A
Headingley & Hyde Park	Jonathan Pryor	2014	Labour	Yes	No
Horsforth	Emmie Bromley	2022	Labour	Yes	Yes
Hunslet & Riverside	Ed Carlisle	2022	Green	Yes	Yes
Killingbeck & Seacroft	John Tudor	2022	Labour	Yes	No
Kippax & Methley	Mary Harland	2012	Labour	Yes	Yes
Kirkstall	Hannah Bithell	2018	Labour	Yes	No
Little London & Woodhouse	Kayleigh Brooks	2018	Labour	Yes	No
Middleton Park	Wayne Dixon	2022	SDP	Yes	Yes
Moortown	Vacant (Note: Councillor Mahalia France-Mir, first elected in 2022, died in January 2026, leaving the seat vacant until the 2026 election.)	—	n/a	N/A	N/A
Morley North	Bob Gettings	2007	Independent (Note: Originally elected as Morley Borough Independents, but left the party to sit as an independent in May 2024.)	No	N/A
Morley North	Vacant (Note: Independent councillor Bob Greetings (originally elected as Morley Borough Independents) resigned in March 2026, leaving the seat vacant until the 2026 election.)	—	n/a	N/A	N/A
Morley South	Oliver Newton	2022	Morley Borough Independents	No	N/A
Otley & Yeadon	Colin Campbell	1982, (Note: As Otley and Wharfedale councillor.) 2004	Liberal Democrats	Yes	Yes
Pudsey	Simon Seary	2018	Conservative	Yes	Yes
Rothwell	Stewart Golton	1998 (Note: From Weetwood ward. Was elected as Rothwell ward councillor in 2006.)	Liberal Democrats	Yes	Yes
Roundhay	Zara Hussain	2021	Independent (Note: Originally elected as Labour, but left the party to sit as an independent in September 2025.)	No	N/A
Temple Newsam	Debra Coupar	2003, (Note: From Morley South ward.) 2006, (Note: From Middleton Park ward.) 2013 (Note: 2 May 2013 by-election) (Note: As a Cross Gates and Whinmoor councillor. Was first elected from Temple Newsam ward in 2018.)	Labour	No	N/A
Temple Newsam	Vacant (Note: Labour councillor Nicole Lloyd, first elected in 2019, resigned in March 2026, leaving the seat vacant until the 2026 election.)	—	n/a	N/A	N/A
Weetwood	Izaak Wilson	2022	Labour	Yes	Yes
Wetherby	Norma Harrington	2018	Conservative	Yes	Yes

== Election summary ==
Labour recorded 23.9% of the popular vote, its lowest vote share in a Leeds City Council election since the council’s establishment in 1973, although it remained the largest party both in the vote and seat share. The popular vote was highly fragmented, with Labour, Reform UK and the Green Party finishing within 2.2 percentage points of each other. The Conservatives and Liberal Democrats both recorded declines in their vote shares but held all the seats they were defending.

Turnout at the election was 41.49%, an increase of 7.3 percentage points from 2024 and the highest turnout at a Leeds City Council election since 2015, when the council election was held concurrently with the general election, and the first time since then that turnout had exceeded 40%.

2026 Leeds City Council election election
Party	Candidates						Votes		
Party	Stood	Elected	Gained	Unseated	Net	% of total	%	No.	Net %
Labour	36 (Note: Includes 16 Labour and Co-operative Party candidates.)	9 (Note: Includes 2 Labour and Co-operative Party elects.)	0	12	▼12	25.0	23.9 (Note: Includes 10.7% of the vote received by Labour and Co-operative Party candidates.)	62,034 (Note: Includes 27,902 votes received by Labour and Co-operative Party candidates.)	▼19.4
Reform	36	8	8	0	▲8	22.2	23.3	60,445	▲22.0
Green	36	7	6	0	▲6	19.4	21.7	56,413	▲5.4
Conservative	36	7	0	0	0	19.4	16.1	41,853	▼4.4
Liberal Democrats	36	2	0	0	0	5.6	7.7	20,025	▼1.7
Morley Borough Independents	3	1	0	2	▼2	2.8	2.8	7,364	▲0.5
Garforth and Swillington Independents	1	1	0	0	0	2.8	1.9	5,007	▲0.1
SDP	21	1	0	0	0	2.8	1.3	3,270	▼0.3
Independent	5	0	0	0	0	0.0	1.0	2,688	▲1.3
Yorkshire	2	0	0	0	0	0.0	0.2	473	▼1.9
TUSC	6	0	0	0	0	0.0	0.1	138	▼0.2
Your Party	1	0	0	0	0	0.0	0.0	62	New
Monster Raving Loony	1	0	0	0	0	0.0	0.0	43	New
UKIP	1	0	0	0	0	0.0	0.0	17	New
Total	221	36	14	14	Steady	100.0	100.0	259,832	N/A
Rejected ballots							0.2	546	
Total							100.0	260,378	
Turnout/registered electors							41.5	576,656	▲7.3

== Results by ward ==
Source: Leeds City Council election results page.

An asterisk (*) denotes the incumbent councillor seeking re-election.

=== Adel and Wharfedale ===
Two seats were up to election due to the resignation of councillor Caroline Anderson.

Adel and Wharfedale (2)
Party	Candidate	Votes	%	±%
Conservative	David Stoddart-Scott	2,462	28.7	▼15.3
Conservative	Lee Farmer	2,452	28.6	▼15.4
Labour Co-op	Jemima Bostock	1,923	22.4	▼12.0
Reform	Craig Gabbitas	1,874	21.8	New
Reform	Michael Lowry	1,833	21.3	New
Labour Co-op	Nathan Ramsden	1,675	19.5	▼14.9
Green	Gordon Howe	1,300	15.1	▲8.3
Green	Dominic Seaward	1,265	14.7	▲8.0
Liberal Democrats	Fiona Allen	1,004	11.7	▲0.4
Liberal Democrats	Ray Smith	668	7.8	▼3.5
Majority		529	6.3	▼3.3
Turnout		8,588	50.4	▲6.0
Rejected ballots		18	0.2	
Registered electors		17,043		
Conservative hold		Swing		
Conservative hold		Swing		

=== Alwoodley ===
Alwoodley returned the Conservatives’ strongest result of the election, with 57.3% of the vote.

Alwoodley
Party	Candidate	Votes	%	±%
Conservative	Dan Cohen*	4,633	57.3	▲8.4
Green	Catherine Taylor	1,133	14.0	▲6.5
Labour Co-op	Matthen McGonagle	1,124	13.9	▼20.2
Reform	Howard Newman	893	11.1	New
Liberal Democrats	Robert Jacques	296	3.7	▼3.2
Majority		3,500	43.3	▲19.5
Turnout		8,096	47.8	▲7.4
Rejected ballots		17	0.2	
Registered electors		16,953		
Conservative hold		Swing	▲14.3	

=== Ardsley and Robin Hood ===
The ward recorded Reform UK’s highest vote share, with the party winning 41.6% of the vote.

Ardsley & Robin Hood
Party	Candidate	Votes	%	±%
Reform	Robert Jagger	3,023	41.6	New
Conservative	Mike Foster	1,492	20.5	▼6.4
Labour	Shamim Miah	1,336	18.4	▼23.0
Green	Noah Bentley	802	11.0	▲6.1
Liberal Democrats	Debra Stretton	476	6.6	▼10.3
SDP	Sian Gardener	135	1.9	0.0
Majority		1,531	21.1	N/A
Turnout		7,280	40.8	▲9.9
Rejected ballots		16	0.2	
Registered electors		17,834		
Reform gain from Labour		Swing	▲32.3	

=== Armley ===
Armley
Party	Candidate	Votes	%	±%
Green	Clancy Walker	2,215	41.7	▼2.1
Reform	Paul Bickerdike	1,443	27.2	New
Labour	Richard Banks	1,137	21.4	▼20.9
Conservative	Edmond Daramy-Williams	268	5.0	▼1.7
Liberal Democrats	Dan Walker	187	3.5	▲1.3
SDP	John Beal	37	0.7	▼0.1
TUSC	Florian Hynam	21	0.4	New
Majority		772	14.5	N/A
Turnout		5,329	32.0	▲3.6
Rejected ballots		21	0.4	
Registered electors		16,681		
Green gain from Labour		Swing	▲11.5	

=== Beeston and Holbeck ===
Beeston and Holbeck
Party	Candidate	Votes	%	±%
Green	Matt Rogan	1,978	34.6	▲11.8
Labour	Al Garthwaite	1,725	30.2	▼22.8
Reform	Loreen Nix	1,245	21.8	New
SDP	Sasha Watson	284	5.0	▼0.2
Conservative	Alex Kettle	280	4.9	▼7.1
Liberal Democrats	Christopher Howden	159	2.8	▼1.9
Monster Raving Loony	Nick The Duck Guy	43	0.8	New
Majority		253	4.4	N/A
Turnout		5,731	31.3	▲5.4
Rejected ballots		17	0.3	
Registered electors		18,361		
Green gain from Labour		Swing	▲17.3	

=== Bramley and Stanningley ===
Bramley and Stanningley recorded Labour’s best performance, where it won 43.8% of the vote, compared with 65.5% in Burmantofts and Richmond Hill at the previous election in 2024.

Bramley and Stanningley
Party	Candidate	Votes	%	±%
Labour	Kevin Ritchie*	2,724	43.8	▼17.0
Reform	Daren Morrish	2,112	34.0	New
Green	Annabell Kesby	883	14.2	▲1.4
Conservative	William Gallimore	308	5.0	▼9.4
Liberal Democrats	Rosemary Spencer	166	2.7	▼8.4
SDP	Ian Howell	20	0.3	▼1.6
Majority		612	9.8	▼36.6
Turnout		6,221	37.0	▲10.7
Rejected ballots		8	0.1	
Registered electors		16,813		
Labour hold		Swing	▼25.5	

=== Burmantofts and Richmond Hill ===
Burmantofts and Richmond Hill
Party	Candidate	Votes	%	±%
Labour	Luke Farley*	1,957	39.4	▼26.1
Reform	Leo Doherty	1,393	28.1	New
Green	Shahab Adris	1,123	22.6	▲14.0
Liberal Democrats	David Hollingsworth	252	5.1	▼2.4
Conservative	Zoe Metcalfe	183	3.7	▼4.1
TUSC	Richard Chaves-Sanderson	34	0.7	▼1.2
SDP	Daniel Whetstone	19	0.4	▼0.3
Majority		564	11.3	▼45.6
Turnout		4,974	29.9	▲5.0
Rejected ballots		13	0.3	
Registered electors		16,628		
Labour hold		Swing	▼27.1	

=== Calverley and Farsley ===
Calverley and Farsley
Party	Candidate	Votes	%	±%
Conservative	Andrew Carter*	3,102	36.6	▼5.3
Labour Co-op	Kathryn Penny	2,313	27.3	▼19.0
Reform	Andy North	1,418	16.7	New
Green	Ellen Graham	1,380	16.3	▲7.6
Liberal Democrats	Stuart McLeod	258	3.0	▼0.1
Majority		789	9.3	▲4.9
Turnout		8,490	46.7	▲4.8
Rejected ballots		19	0.2	
Registered electors		18,198		
Conservative hold		Swing	▲6.9	

=== Chapel Allerton ===
The Green gain from Labour represented the largest majority overturned at the election. In 2022, Labour had won the ward by 3,959 votes, a majority of 62.8 percentage points.

Chapel Allerton
Party	Candidate	Votes	%	±%
Green	Cristiana Mirosanu	3,520	45.1	▲24.1
Labour Co-op	Eileen Taylor*	2,971	38.0	▼24.7
Reform	Yaseen Saddique	594	7.6	N/A
Conservative	Kevin Black	382	4.9	▼1.3
Liberal Democrats	Darren Finlay	287	3.7	▲1.2
SDP	Richard Cowles	55	0.7	▼0.4
Majority		549	7.1	N/A
Turnout		7,838	42.8	▲6.1
Rejected ballots		29	0.4	
Registered electors		18,331		
Green gain from Labour Co-op		Swing	▲24.4	

=== Cross Gates and Whinmoor ===
Cross Gates and Whinmoor
Party	Candidate	Votes	%	±%
Reform	Paula-Jane Thackray	3,013	41.1	▲32.5
Labour	Luke Murrow	2,051	28.0	▼25.2
Conservative	John Kennedy	902	12.3	▼9.3
Green	Martin Hemingway	706	9.6	▲4.1
Liberal Democrats	Joshua Lowthion	260	3.5	▼1.8
Independent	Mark Nicholson	223	3.0	New
Yorkshire	Howard Dews	157	2.1	▼3.7
SDP	Paul Whetstone	14	0.2	New
TUSC	Ali Mansfield	11	0.1	New
Majority		962	13.1	N/A
Turnout		7,342	40.5	▲10.5
Rejected ballots		5	0.1	
Registered electors		18,116		
Reform gain from Labour		Swing	▲28.9	

=== Farnley and Wortley ===
Farnley and Wortley
Party	Candidate	Votes	%	±%
Reform	Wenzdae Robbins	2,397	37.2	New
Green	Ann Blackburn	1,635	25.4	▼10.0
Labour Co-op	Charlotte Hill	983	15.3	▼30.4
Independent	Peter Allison	922	14.3	New
Conservative	Shikha Chaturvedi	304	4.7	▼7.9
Liberal Democrats	Peter Andrews	178	2.8	▼1.9
SDP	Richard Riley	19	0.3	▼1.3
Majority		762	11.8	N/A
Turnout		6,443	35.4	▲8.4
Rejected ballots		5	0.1	
Registered electors		18,165		
Reform gain from Labour		Swing	▲33.8	

=== Garforth and Swillington ===
The ward recorded the Green Party’s and Liberal Democrats’ lowest vote shares of the election, with the parties receiving 5.4% and 1.1% of the vote respectively.

Garforth and Swillington
Party	Candidate	Votes	%	±%
Garforth and Swillington Independents	Mark Dobson*	5,007	62.4	▲8.1
Reform	David Butterfield	1,582	19.7	▲14.4
Labour	David Nagle	542	6.8	▼12.4
Green	Alexander Bull	433	5.4	▲1.2
Conservative	Peter Bentley	362	4.5	▼8.3
Liberal Democrats	Rebecca Phillips	92	1.1	▼2.2
Majority		3,425	42.7	▲7.6
Turnout		8,034	48.8	▲8.9
Rejected ballots		16	0.2	
Registered electors		16,462		
Garforth and Swillington Independents hold		Swing	▲10.3	

=== Gipton and Harehills ===
Gipton and Harehills
Party	Candidate	Votes	%	±%
Labour Co-op	Salma Arif*	2,345	36.9	▼2.1
Green	Khizer Quayyum	1,936	30.5	▼21.1
Independent	Arif Hussain	1,108	17.4	New
Reform	Callum Bushrod	612	9.6	New
Conservative	Patricia Jones	174	2.7	▼2.1
Liberal Democrats	Jack Glover	104	1.6	▼1.0
TUSC	Iain Dalton	30	0.5	▼1.5
SDP	Andrew Martin	29	0.5	New
UKIP	Andrew Nix	17	0.3	New
Majority		409	6.4	▼6.4
Turnout		6,382	36.3	▲3.2
Rejected ballots		27	0.4	
Registered electors		17,583		
Labour Co-op hold		Swing	▲9.5	

=== Guiseley and Rawdon ===
Guiseley and Rawdon
Party	Candidate	Votes	%	±%
Labour Co-op	Eleanor Thomson*	3,469	37.7	▼8.9
Conservative	Paul Alderson	2,407	26.2	▼9.8
Reform	Robert Harder	1,813	19.7	New
Green	Eliza Ainley	918	10.0	▲5.3
Yorkshire	Bob Buxton	316	3.4	▼5.3
Liberal Democrats	Helen Page	279	3.0	▼1.1
Majority		1062	11.5	▲0.9
Turnout		9,218	50.3	▲7.9
Rejected ballots		16	0.2	
Registered electors		18,334		
Labour Co-op hold		Swing	▲0.5	

=== Harewood ===
Harewood
Party	Candidate	Votes	%	±%
Conservative	Angela Wallis	3,380	44.1	▼14.8
Reform	John Cowling	1,911	24.9	New
Labour	David Bowgett	1,007	13.1	▼12.3
Green	Claire Evans	842	11.0	0.0
Liberal Democrats	John Hills	300	3.9	▼1.0
Independent	Patrick Wright	224	2.9	New
Majority		1,469	19.2	▼14.2
Turnout		7,673	51.2	▲9.4
Rejected ballots		9	0.1	
Registered electors		14,982		
Conservative hold		Swing	▼19.9	

=== Headingley and Hyde Park ===
The ward recorded the lowest turnout in the election, at 28.0%. It also returned the highest vote share achieved by any party, with the Green Party winning 70.6% of the vote, and produced the largest percentage majority, at 49.8 percentage points. The Conservatives and Reform UK recorded their lowest vote shares of the election in the ward, receiving 1.6% and 3.7% of the vote respectively.

Headingley and Hyde Park
Party	Candidate	Votes	%	±%
Green	Nilesh Chohan	4,334	70.6	▲19.4
Labour Co-op	Jonathan Pryor*	1,278	20.8	▼20.2
Reform	Andrew Wilde	225	3.7	New
Liberal Democrats	Brandon Ashford	139	2.3	▼0.7
Conservative	Della Heptinstall	97	1.6	▼0.7
Your Party	Ryan Richards	62	1.0	New
Majority		3,056	49.8	N/A
Turnout		6,151	28.0	▲3.9
Rejected ballots		16	0.3	
Registered electors		22,004		
Green gain from Labour		Swing	▲19.8	

=== Horsforth ===
Horsforth
Party	Candidate	Votes	%	±%
Labour	Emmie Bromley*	3,018	34.1	▼22.5
Conservative	Chris Calvert	2,063	23.3	▼2.1
Green	Khadijah Akhtar	1,719	19.4	▲12.1
Reform	Michael Meston	1,450	16.4	New
Liberal Democrats	Ivan Brookes	570	6.4	▲1.7
SDP	Catherine Dobson	25	0.3	▼0.2
Majority		955	11.8	▼19.4
Turnout		8,869	49.3	▲5.5
Rejected ballots		24	0.3	
Registered electors		17,991		
Labour hold		Swing	▼10.2	

=== Hunslet and Riverside ===
Hunslet and Riverside
Party	Candidate	Votes	%	±%
Green	Ed Carlisle	3,202	56.3	▲14.3
Labour Co-op	Sarata Sawo	1,422	25.0	▼21.2
Reform	Ayesha Shamim	700	12.3	New
Conservative	Taiwo Adeyemi	199	3.5	▼1.5
Liberal Democrats	Roderic Parker	112	2.0	▼1.8
SDP	Paul Thomas	57	1.0	▼1.2
Majority		1,780	31.3	▲27.1
Turnout		5,711	33.8	▲5.3
Rejected ballots		19	0.3	
Registered electors		16,891		
Green hold		Swing	▲17.8	

=== Killingbeck and Seacroft ===
Killingbeck and Seacroft
Party	Candidate	Votes	%	±%
Reform	David Dresser	2,371	41.1	▲30.6
Labour	John Tudor*	1,794	31.1	▼30.2
Green	Nosheen Majid	899	15.6	▲5.8
Conservative	Rosemary Gaskell	446	7.7	▼3.9
Liberal Democrats	Ben Turner-Chastney	214	3.7	▼0.7
SDP	Thomas Foster	50	0.9	▼1.6
Majority		577	10.0	N/A
Turnout		5,793	31.3	▲8.6
Rejected ballots		19	0.3	
Registered electors		18,493		
Reform gain from Labour		Swing	▲30.4	

=== Kippax and Methley ===
Kippax and Methley
Party	Candidate	Votes	%	±%
Labour	Mary Harland*	3,336	41.8	▼23.3
Reform	Chris Weightman	3,038	38.1	New
Conservative	Connor Mulhall	717	9.0	▼10.5
Green	Andy Phillips	674	8.5	▲0.3
Liberal Democrats	Thomas Leadley	208	2.6	▼4.7
Majority		298	3.7	▼41.9
Turnout		7,991	44.4	▲12.8
Rejected ballots		18	0.2	
Registered electors		18,002		
Labour hold		Swing	▼30.7	

=== Kirkstall ===
Kirkstall
Party	Candidate	Votes	%	±%
Green	Joe Ingham	2,922	45.2	▲24.7
Labour	Hannah Bithell*	1,958	30.3	▼32.0
Reform	Jacob Holmes	946	14.6	New
Conservative	Dawn Collins	240	3.7	▼2.1
Independent	Stuart Long	211	3.3	▼0.4
Liberal Democrats	Chris Read	178	2.8	▼2.4
TUSC	George Phillips	16	0.2	▼2.3
Majority		964	14.9	N/A
Turnout		6,486	41.5	▲6.4
Rejected ballots		15	0.2	
Registered electors		15,617		
Green gain from Labour		Swing	▲28.4	

=== Little London and Woodhouse ===
The ward recorded the largest swing of the election, with a 37.5% swing from Labour to Green Party. The ward also saw the largest increase in vote share, with the Greens gaining 38.2 percentage points, and the largest decrease, with Labour’s vote share falling by 36.8 percentage points.

Little London and Woodhouse
Party	Candidate	Votes	%	±%
Green	Eden Hills	2,617	60.2	▲38.2
Labour	Kayleigh Brooks*	1,001	23.0	▼36.8
Reform	Bradley Holmes	326	7.5	New
Liberal Democrats	George Sykes	255	5.9	▼1.2
Conservative	Jonathan Burkitt	125	2.9	▼5.2
TUSC	TJ Diniz Mota	26	0.6	▼2.4
Majority		1,616	37.1	N/A
Turnout		4,365	28.7	▲5.4
Rejected ballots		15	0.3	
Registered electors		15,232		
Green gain from Labour		Swing	▲37.5	

=== Middleton Park ===
Middleton Park was the SDP’s only victory of the election, with the party retaining the ward despite a reduced vote share.

Middleton Park
Party	Candidate	Votes	%	±%
SDP	Wayne Dixon*	2,203	38.2	▼4.6
Reform	James Kendall	1,936	33.5	New
Labour Co-op	Innocent Igiehon	773	13.4	▼23.9
Green	Ciaran Head	545	9.4	▲0.2
Conservative	Samson Adeyemi	206	3.6	▼4.0
Liberal Democrats	Kristof Szecsi	108	1.9	▼1.3
Majority		267	4.7	▼0.9
Turnout		5,783	29.5	▲7.3
Rejected ballots		12	0.3	
Registered electors		19,618		
SDP hold		Swing	▼19.1	

=== Moortown ===
Moortown
Party	Candidate	Votes	%	±%
Labour	Laura Fisher	2,758	32.9	▼20.6
Green	Rachel Hartshorne	2,447	29.2	▲11.2
Liberal Democrats	Sharon Slinger	1,277	15.2	▲5.8
Reform	Sajjad Raja	1,011	12.1	New
Conservative	Rob Speed	838	10.0	▼3.8
SDP	Sarah Welbourne	43	0.5	0.0
Majority		311	3.7	▼31.8
Turnout		8,407	49.2	▲6.9
Rejected ballots		33	0.4	
Registered electors		17,094		
Labour hold		Swing	▼15.9	

=== Morley North ===
Two seats were up to election due to the resignation of councillor Robert Finnigan.

Morley North (2)
Party	Candidate	Votes	%	±%
Morley Borough Independents	Terry Grayshon	2,780	35.5	
Reform	Jonathan Graves	2,707	34.2	
Morley Borough Independents	Simon Kimberley	2,627		
Reform	Dinah Jones	2,515		
Labour	Edward Brown	892	10.7	
Labour	Jonny Kelsey	743		
Green	Amber Conyers-Davies	736	9.1	
Conservative	Pauline Barron	678	7.1	
Green	Kasim Rasool	657		
Conservative	Louisa Singh	407		
Liberal Democrats	James Trueman	313	3.2	
Liberal Democrats	Mihai Barticel	173		
SDP	Nigel Perry	21	0.1	
Majority				
Turnout			42.8	▲9.1
Rejected ballots		13		
Registered electors		18,485		
Morley Borough Independents hold		Swing		
Reform gain from Morley Borough Independents		Swing		

=== Morley South ===
Morley South
Party	Candidate	Votes	%	±%
Reform	Michael Burnham	2,564	35.1	▲28.1
Morley Borough Independents	Darren Senior	1,957	26.8	▼11.2
Liberal Democrats	Michael Fox	992	13.6	▲12.0
Green	Matthew Ball	793	10.8	▲1.9
Labour Co-op	Adrian Blake	594	8.1	▼23.1
Conservative	John Barron	402	5.5	▼4.1
SDP	Cordelia Lynan	12	0.2	▲0.1
Majority		607	8.3	N/A
Turnout		7,328	40.5	▲8.8
Rejected ballots		14	0.2	
Registered electors		18,115		
Reform gain from Morley Borough Independents		Swing	▲19.7	

=== Otley and Yeadon ===
Otley and Yeadon
Party	Candidate	Votes	%	±%
Liberal Democrats	Colin Campbell*	3,189	36.4	▼10.5
Reform	Scott Richmond	2,195	25.0	New
Green	Mick Bradley	1,746	19.9	▲4.9
Labour	Simon Dowling	1,038	11.8	▼14.3
Conservative	Paul Wadsworth	600	6.8	▲0.1
Majority		994	11.4	▼9.4
Turnout		8,783	50.4	▲8.2
Rejected ballots		15	0.2	
Registered electors		17,428		
Liberal Democrats hold		Swing	▼17.8	

=== Pudsey ===
Pudsey
Party	Candidate	Votes	%	±%
Conservative	Simon Seary*	4,415	51.8	▲6.2
Reform	Richard Robinson	1,531	17.9	▲12.0
Labour	Stephen McBarron	1,304	15.3	▼25.2
Green	Arlan Jones	1,105	13.0	▲7.1
Liberal Democrats	Jennifer Wilson	176	2.1	▼1.2
Majority		2,884	33.9	▲28.8
Turnout		8,550	44.9	▲5.7
Rejected ballots		19	0.2	
Registered electors		19,050		
Conservative hold		Swing	▼2.9	

=== Rothwell ===
Despite a sizeable decrease, the ward recorded the Liberal Democrats’ highest vote share in the election, at 52.5%

Rothwell
Party	Candidate	Votes	%	±%
Liberal Democrats	Stewart Golton*	3,772	52.5	▼9.6
Reform	Lindon Dove	1,929	26.9	New
Green	Mikey Sykes	638	8.9	▲5.6
Labour	Archie Sykes	495	6.9	▼15.1
Conservative	Stewart Harper	293	4.1	▼1.9
SDP	Mark Daniels	52	0.7	▼0.1
Majority		1,843	25.6	▼14.5
Turnout		7,189	45.3	▲5.2
Rejected ballots		10	0.1	
Registered electors		15,859		
Liberal Democrats hold		Swing	▼18.3	

=== Roundhay ===
Roundhay was the closest contest of the election, with Labour retaining the ward by just 74 votes, a majority of 0.8 percentage points, over the Green Party.

Roundhay
Party	Candidate	Votes	%	±%
Labour	Kathleen Johnstone	3,316	38.1	▼17.3
Green	Brannoc Stevenson	3,242	37.3	▲10.6
Conservative	Rachel Cohen	918	10.6	▼0.9
Reform	Steven Robinson	851	9.8	New
Liberal Democrats	Najeeb Iqbal	316	3.6	▼1.1
SDP	Carl Richman	56	0.6	▼1.2
Majority		74	0.8	▼27.9
Turnout		8,722	50.1	▲8.2
Rejected ballots		23	0.3	
Registered electors		17,405		
Labour hold		Swing	▼14.0	

=== Temple Newsam ===
Two seats were up to election due to the resignation of councillor Nicole Sharpe.

Temple Newsam (2)
Party	Candidate	Votes	%	±%
Reform	Richard Barker	2,456	36.1	
Reform	Kieran White	2,253		
Labour Co-op	Julia Almond	1,990	29.1	
Labour Co-op	Tim Dowd	1,809		
Conservative	Maggie Taylor	1,172	16.6	
Conservative	Max Holley	992		
Green	Joshua Alston	813	12.1	
Green	Keely Bannister	768		
Liberal Democrats	Keith Norman	355	5.2	
Liberal Democrats	Noah Allerton	317		
SDP	Kimberley Reid	60	0.8	
SDP	Rajiv Thukral	49		
Majority				
Turnout			41.8	
Rejected ballots		10		
Registered electors		16,650		
Reform gain from Labour		Swing		
Reform gain from Labour		Swing		

=== Weetwood ===
Weetwood
Party	Candidate	Votes	%	±%
Labour Co-op	Izaak Wilson*	2,684	33.9	▼15.7
Liberal Democrats	Chris Howley	2,213	27.9	▼4.7
Green	Simon Dixon	1,901	24.0	▲12.7
Reform	Peter Young	821	10.4	New
Conservative	Brijesh Virola	270	3.4	▼2.1
SDP	Rob Walker	30	0.4	▼0.6
Majority		471	6.0	▼11.0
Turnout		7,939	50.3	▲7.0
Rejected ballots		20	0.3	
Registered electors		15,771		
Labour hold		Swing	▼5.5	

=== Wetherby ===
The ward recorded the highest turnout in the election, with 51.5% of registered electors casting a ballot, and Labour’s lowest vote share, at 6.5%.

Wetherby
Party	Candidate	Votes	%	±%
Conservative	Norma Harrington*	3,684	43.5	▼5.7
Green	Fran Murphy	2,586	30.5	▼7.0
Reform	Stuard Burdekin	1,464	17.3	New
Labour Co-op	Alex Riddell	549	6.5	▼3.2
Liberal Democrats	Jonathan Levy	182	2.2	▼0.8
Majority		1,098	13.0	▲1.3
Turnout		8,480	51.5	▲5.6
Rejected ballots		15	0.2	
Registered electors		16,467		
Conservative hold		Swing	▲0.6	

== Post-election events ==
Following the election, Labour councillor James Lewis, who had served as leader of the council since 2021, was re-elected to the post, heading a minority administration.

Labour councillor Stephen Holroyd was appointed the 132nd Lord Mayor of Leeds, the first openly gay person to hold the office.

== Changes between 2026 and 2027 ==
- May 2026: Jessica Lennox (Labour, Cross Gates and Whinmoor ward) leaves the party to sit as an independent
- September 2026: Peter Carlill (Labour, Calverley and Farsley ward) resigns, citing "health reasons". By-election scheduled for October
- September 2026: Cristiana Mirosanu (Green, Chapel Allerton ward) leaves the party to sit as an independent
- October 2026: David Dresser (Reform UK, Killingbeck and Seacroft ward) and Paula-Jane Thackray (Reform UK, Cross Gates and Whinmoor ward) both leave the party to form the Leeds First Independents group. Later in the month, Thackray resigns from the council (with the by-election scheduled for December) and the Leeds First Independent group comes to an end, with Dresser now sitting as an independent.

=== By-elections ===
==== Calverley & Farsley ====
Calverley and Farsley by-election, 22 October 2026 Resignation of Peter Carlill (Labour)
Party	Candidate	Votes	%	±%
Conservative	Amanda Carter	2,330	40.2	+3.6
Labour	Kathryn Penny	2,134	36.8	+9.5
Reform	Craig Gabbitas	693	12.0	−4.7
Green	Daisy Gilpin	341	5.9	−10.4
Restore	Bradley Holmes	151	2.6	New
Liberal Democrats	Stuart McLeod	92	1.6	−1.4
Yorkshire	Bob Buxton	57	1.0	New
Majority		196	3.4	−5.9
Rejected ballots		6	0.1	-0.1
Turnout		5,804	32.2	−14.5
Registered electors				
Conservative gain from Labour		Swing	▼3.0	

==== Cross Gates and Whinmoor ====
Cross Gates and Whinmoor by-election, 10 December 2026 Resignation of Paula-Jane Thackray (Independent)
Party	Candidate	Votes	%	±%
Liberal Democrats	Noah Allerton			
Restore	Victoria Bowen			
Yorkshire	Howard Dews			
Conservative	Rosemary Gaskell			
SDP	Michael Hunter			
Reform	James Kendall			
Labour	Luke Murrow			
Independent	Mark Nicholson			
Green	Colin Noble			
Majority				
Turnout				
		Swing		
