= Otley and Yeadon (ward) =

Electoral ward in Leeds, England

- Otley and Yeadon highlighted within Leeds
- Population: 18,283 (2023 electorate)
- Metropolitan borough: City of Leeds
- Metropolitan county: West Yorkshire
- Region: Yorkshire and the Humber
- Country: England
- Sovereign state: United Kingdom
- UK Parliament: Leeds North West
- Councillors: Colin Campbell (Liberal Democrats); Ryk Downes (Liberal Democrats); Sandy Lay (Liberal Democrats)

Otley and Yeadon is an electoral ward of Leeds City Council in north west Leeds, West Yorkshire, covering the towns of Otley and Yeadon (except for a southern part in Guiseley and Rawdon ward) as well as Newall.

== Boundaries ==
The Otley and Yeadon ward includes the following civil parishes of:

- Carlton (part of Bramhope and Carlton Parish Council, although Bramhope Parish sits in the neighbouring Adel and Wharfedale ward)
- Otley (Otley Town Council)

== Councillors ==
Election	Councillor	Councillor	Councillor
2004	Graham Kirkland (LD) (Note: Kirkland had been a councillor for Otley ward from 1973 to 1976 and Otley and Wharfedale ward from 1980 to 2003.)	Colin Campbell (LD) (Note: Campbell had previously been an Otley and Wharfedale councillor from 1982 to 1998.)	Ryk Downes (LD)
2006	Graham Kirkland (LD)	Colin Campbell (LD)	Ryk Downes (LD)
2007	Graham Kirkland (LD)	Colin Campbell (LD)	Ryk Downes (LD)
2008	Graham Kirkland (LD)	Colin Campbell (LD)	Ryk Downes (LD)
2010	Graham Kirkland (LD)	Colin Campbell (LD)	Ryk Downes (LD)
2011	Graham Kirkland (LD)	Colin Campbell (LD)	Ryk Downes (LD)
2012	Sandy Lay (LD)	Colin Campbell (LD)	Ryk Downes (LD)
2014	Sandy Lay (LD)	Colin Campbell (LD)	Ryk Downes (LD)
2015	Sandy Lay (LD)	Colin Campbell (LD)	Ryk Downes (LD)
2016	Sandy Lay (LD)	Colin Campbell (LD)	Ryk Downes (LD)
2018	Sandy Lay (LD)	Colin Campbell (LD)	Ryk Downes (LD)
2019	Sandy Lay (LD)	Colin Campbell (LD)	Ryk Downes (LD)
2021	Sandy Lay (LD)	Colin Campbell (LD)	Ryk Downes (LD)
2022	Sandy Lay (LD)	Colin Campbell (LD)	Ryk Downes (LD)
2023	Sandy Lay (LD)	Colin Campbell (LD)	Ryk Downes (LD)
2024	Sandy Lay (LD)	Colin Campbell (LD)	Ryk Downes (LD)
2026	Sandy Lay* (LD)	Colin Campbell* (LD)	Ryk Downes* (LD)

indicates seat up for re-election. * indicates incumbent councillor.

== Elections since 2010 ==
=== May 2026 ===
2026
Party	Candidate	Votes	%	±%
Liberal Democrats	Colin Andrew Campbell*	3,189	36.4	▼10.5
Reform	Scott Michael Richmond	2,195	25.0	New
Green	Mick Bradley	1,746	19.9	▲4.9
Labour	Simon Mark Dowling	1,038	11.8	▼14.3
Conservative	Paul John Spencer Wadsworth	600	6.8	▲0.1
Turnout			50.4	
Rejected ballots		15		
Registered electors		17,428		
Liberal Democrats hold		Swing		

=== May 2024 ===
2024
Party	Candidate	Votes	%	±%
Liberal Democrats	Sandy Lay*	3,455	46.9	+1.6
Labour Co-op	Ian McCargo	1,924	26.1	+1.6
Green	Mick Bradley	1,106	15.0	+1.6
Conservative	Jas Singh	491	6.7	−4.5
Yorkshire	Noah Libbish	392	5.3	+2.5
Majority		1,531	20.8	±0.0
Turnout		7,403	42.2	+3.7
Liberal Democrats hold		Swing	±0.0	

=== May 2023 ===
2023
Party	Candidate	Votes	%	±%
Liberal Democrats	Ryk Downes*	3,189	45.3	−1.7
Labour Co-op	Ian McCargo	1,727	24.5	+2.0
Green	Mick Bradley	946	13.4	+1.1
Conservative	Stewart Harper	791	11.2	−1.3
Yorkshire	Claire Buxton	197	2.8	−2.6
Breakthrough Party	Elliot Nathan	156	2.2	N/A
Majority		1,462	20.8	−3.7
Turnout		7,037	38.5	+6.3
Liberal Democrats hold		Swing		

=== May 2022 ===
2022
Party	Candidate	Votes	%	±%
Liberal Democrats	Colin Campbell*	3,546	47.0	+2.0
Labour	Steve Clapcote	1,695	22.5	+1.1
Conservative	Lee Farmer	939	12.5	−4.3
Green	Mick Bradley	928	12.3	+0.7
Yorkshire	Claire Buxton	405	5.4	+0.8
Majority		1,851	24.5	+1.0
Turnout		7,542	42.4	−4.5
Liberal Democrats hold		Swing		

=== May 2021 ===
2021
Party	Candidate	Votes	%	±%
Liberal Democrats	Sandy Lay*	3,766	45.0	−4.6
Labour	Lucy Nuttgens	1,793	21.4	+1.9
Conservative	Stewart Harper	1,408	16.8	+7.5
Green	Mick Bradley	978	11.6	−1.4
Yorkshire	Claire Jane Buxton	387	4.6	N/A
Majority		1,973	23.5	−7.6
Turnout		8,378	46.9	+7.3
Liberal Democrats hold		Swing		

=== May 2019 ===
2019
Party	Candidate	Votes	%	±%
Liberal Democrats	Ryk Downes*	3,436	49.6	+6.2
Labour	Elliot Nathan	1,347	19.5	−7.4
Green	Mick Bradley	901	13.0	−1.3
Conservative	Stewart Harper	645	9.3	−3.3
UKIP	John Adrian Hook	429	6.2	+6.2
For Britain	Tom Hollings	163	2.4	−0.4
Majority		2,089	30.1	+11.5
Turnout		6,985	39.6	−3.8
Liberal Democrats hold		Swing	+6.8	

=== May 2018 ===
2018
Party	Candidate	Votes	%	±%
Liberal Democrats	Colin Campbell*	3,768	43.4	−4.7
Liberal Democrats	Sandy Lay*	3,757		
Liberal Democrats	Ryk Downes*	3,663		
Labour	Sian Gregory	2,340	26.9	+3.4
Labour	Elliot Nathan	2,200		
Labour	James Ranson	1,703		
Green	Mick Bradley	1,245	14.3	+10.2
Conservative	Kenneth Creek	1,094	12.6	+3.6
Conservative	Diane Fox	978		
Conservative	Philip Rees	974		
For Britain	Tom Hollings	241	2.8	N/A
Majority		1,428	18.6	−6.0
Turnout		7,677	43.4	−1.7
Liberal Democrats hold		Swing	-8.0	
Liberal Democrats hold		Swing		
Liberal Democrats hold		Swing		

=== May 2016 ===
2016
Party	Candidate	Votes	%	±%
Liberal Democrats	Sandy Lay*	3,737	48.1	+12.6
Labour	Nik Rutherford	1,825	23.5	−2.6
Conservative	Jonathon Taylor	702	9.0	−9.0
UKIP	Tom Hollings	675	8.7	−2.7
Green	Mick Bradley	501	6.5	−2.5
Independent	Jackie Brown	323	4.1	+4.1
Majority		1,912	24.6	+15.2
Turnout		7,763	45.1	
Liberal Democrats hold		Swing	+7.6	

=== May 2015 ===
2015
Party	Candidate	Votes	%	±%
Liberal Democrats	Colin Campbell*	4,347	35.5	−3.1
Labour	John Eveleigh	3,193	26.1	+0.7
Conservative	John Bale	2,200	18.0	+5.8
UKIP	Tom Hollings	1,396	11.4	−5.9
Green	Mick Bradley	1,098	9.0	+2.5
Majority		1,154	9.4	+7.5
Turnout		12,234	69.5	
Liberal Democrats hold		Swing	-1.9	

=== May 2014 ===
2014
Party	Candidate	Votes	%	±%
Liberal Democrats	Ryk Downes*	2,916	38.6	−5.0
Labour	Carl Morris	1,916	25.4	−9.6
UKIP	Tom Hollings	1,306	17.3	+17.3
Conservative	Gerard Francis	921	12.2	−0.5
Green	Owen Brear	490	6.5	+0.2
Majority		1000	13.2	+4.6
Turnout		7,549	43.65	
Liberal Democrats hold		Swing	+2.3	

=== May 2012 ===
2012
Party	Candidate	Votes	%	±%
Liberal Democrats	Sandy Lay	3,259	43.6	+5.0
Labour	John Eveleigh	2,615	35.0	−1.7
Conservative	Makhan Thakur	947	12.7	−12.0
Green	Steven Crossan	474	6.3	+6.3
TUSC	Ryan Preston	176	2.4	+2.4
Majority		644	8.6	+6.7
Turnout		7,471		
Liberal Democrats hold		Swing	+3.3	

=== May 2011 ===
2011
Party	Candidate	Votes	%	±%
Liberal Democrats	Colin Campbell*	3,185	38.6	−6.3
Labour	John Eveleigh	3,026	36.7	+12.8
Conservative	Nigel Fancis	2,034	24.7	−0.4
Majority		159	1.9	−17.9
Turnout		8,245	47	
Liberal Democrats hold		Swing	-9.5	

=== May 2010 ===
2010
Party	Candidate	Votes	%	±%
Liberal Democrats	Ryk Downes*	5,647	44.9	+6.1
Conservative	Nigel Francis	3,159	25.1	−3.0
Labour	John Eveleigh	3,011	23.9	+1.4
BNP	Geoffrey Bulmer	527	4.2	−0.8
Alliance for Green Socialism	Francis Denning	233	1.9	−0.5
Majority		2,488	19.8	+9.1
Turnout		12,577	72.0	+27.8
Liberal Democrats hold		Swing	+4.5	
