= Middleton Park (ward) =

Electoral ward in Leeds, England

- Middleton Park highlighted within Leeds
- Population: 20,215 (2023 electorate)
- Metropolitan borough: City of Leeds
- Metropolitan county: West Yorkshire
- Region: Yorkshire and the Humber
- Country: England
- Sovereign state: United Kingdom
- UK Parliament: Leeds South
- Councillors: Rob Chesterfield (SDP); Wayne Dixon (SDP); Emma Pogson-Golden (SDP)

Middleton Park is an electoral ward of Leeds City Council in south Leeds, West Yorkshire, including the urban suburbs of Middleton and Belle Isle. The ward is named after the public park and former manorial estate of Middleton Park.

== Demographics ==
In 2010, the ward had 27,487 inhabitants, of which 52.2% of the population were female and 47.8% male. 21.5% were aged 15 or under compared with an England average of 18.7%. Life Expectancy for males and females is more than three years less than the rest of Leeds. In 2001, 96.3% of residents identified as White British, 71.6% identifying as Christian and over 18% having no religion. Most houses in the ward are in the Council Tax Bands A and B. In April 2012, 1,493 (8.3%) people claimed Jobseeker's Allowance, nearly double the Leeds' average at the time. While all recorded crime was below the Leeds' average, criminal damage was substantially higher and nearly twice the England average.

== Councillors ==
Election	Councillor	Councillor	Councillor
2004	Geoff Driver (Lab) (Note: Driver first represented Hunslet East and West ward from 1978 and then Hunslet ward since 1980.)	Judith Blake (Lab) (Note: Blake was previously a Weetwood ward councillor from 1996 until she lost her seat in 2000. She went on to serve as a Hunslet ward councillor from 2002 until her election for Middleton Park ward.)	Stuart Bruce (Lab) (Note: Bruce had been a Middleton ward councillor since 1999.)
2006	Geoff Driver (Lab)	Judith Blake (Lab)	Debra Coupar (Lab) (Note: Coupar was previously a councillor for Morley South ward for a year from 2003 before losing her seat in 2004.)
2007	Geoff Driver (Lab)	Judith Blake (Lab)	Debra Coupar (Lab)
2008	Geoff Driver (Lab)	Judith Blake (Lab)	Debra Coupar (Lab) (Note: Coupar was later elected as a councillor for Cross Gates and Whinmoor ward in the 2013 by-election and has represented Temple Newsam ward since 2016.)
2010	Geoff Driver (Lab)	Judith Blake (Lab)	Kim Groves (Lab)
2011	Geoff Driver (Lab)	Judith Blake (Lab)	Kim Groves (Lab)
2012	Paul Truswell (Lab) (Note: Truswell represented Headingley ward from 1982 to 1997. He resigned as a councillor following his election as Member of Parliament for Pudsey at the 1997 general election.)	Judith Blake (Lab)	Kim Groves (Lab)
2014	Paul Truswell (Lab)	Judith Blake (Lab)	Kim Groves (Lab)
2015	Paul Truswell (Lab)	Judith Blake (Lab)	Kim Groves (Lab)
2016	Paul Truswell (Lab)	Judith Blake (Lab)	Kim Groves (Lab)
2018	Paul Truswell (Lab)	Judith Blake CBE (Lab) (Note: Blake was awarded a CBE in November 2017.)	Kim Groves (Lab)
2019	Paul Truswell (Lab)	Judith Blake CBE (Lab) (Note: Blake was created a life peer as Baroness Blake of Leeds, of Gledhow in the City of Leeds on 10 February 2021 and resigned as Leader of the Council on 24 February. She did not seek re-election in the May 2021 council election.)	Kim Groves (Lab)
2021	Paul Truswell (Lab)	Sharon Burke (Lab)	Kim Groves (Lab)
2022	Paul Truswell (Lab)	Sharon Burke (Lab)	Wayne Dixon (SDP)
2023	Emma Pogson-Golden (SDP)	Sharon Burke (Lab)	Wayne Dixon (SDP)
2024	Emma Pogson-Golden* (SDP)	Rob Chesterfield* (SDP)	Wayne Dixon* (SDP)
2026	Emma Pogson-Golden* (SDP)	Rob Chesterfield* (SDP)	Wayne Dixon* (SDP)

indicates seat up for re-election. * indicates incumbent councillor.

== Elections since 2010 ==
=== May 2026 ===
2026
Party	Candidate	Votes	%	±%
SDP	Wayne Dixon*	2,203	38.2	−4.6
Reform	James Kendall	1,936	33.5	N/A
Labour Co-op	Innocent Igiehon	773	13.4	−23.9
Green	Ciaran Head	545	9.4	+0.2
Conservative	Samson Adeyemi	206	3.6	−4.0
Liberal Democrats	Kristof Szecsi	108	1.9	−1.3
Majority		267	4.6	−0.9
Turnout		5,771	29.5	+7.3
SDP hold		Swing		

=== May 2024 ===
2024
Party	Candidate	Votes	%	±%
SDP	Rob Chesterfield	1,882	42.8	−3.1
Labour	Sharon Burke*	1,638	37.3	+0.6
Green	Julie Gill	402	9.2	+4.9
Conservative	Samson Adeyemi	332	7.6	−1.1
Liberal Democrats	Michael Follows	139	3.2	+1.2
Majority		244	5.5	−3.7
Turnout		4,423	22.2	+0.8
SDP gain from Labour		Swing	-1.8	

=== May 2023 ===
2023
Party	Candidate	Votes	%	±%
SDP	Emma Pogson-Golden	1,985	45.9	−4.6
Labour Co-op	Lauren Summers	1,587	36.7	+0.7
Conservative	Samson Adeyemi	376	8.7	+1.0
Green	Eunice Agbemafle	186	4.3	+0.4
TUSC	Joelle Donaldson	91	2.1	N/A
Liberal Democrats	Jude Arbuckle	86	2.0	+0.5
Majority		398	13.8	−0.8
Turnout		4,320	21.4	−4.9
SDP gain from Labour		Swing		

=== May 2022 ===
2022
Party	Candidate	Votes	%	±%
SDP	Wayne Dixon	2,687	50.5	+15.8
Labour	Peter Chambers	1,910	36.0	−4.9
Conservative	Taiwo Adeyemi	408	7.7	−8.5
Green	Kay-Lee Asquith	207	3.9	−1.5
Liberal Democrats	Jude Arbuckle	82	1.5	−0.6
Majority		777	14.6	−0.1
Turnout		5,317	26.3	−1.5
SDP gain from Labour		Swing		

=== May 2021 ===
2021
Party	Candidate	Votes	%	±%
Labour	Sharon Burke	2,313	40.9	−2.3
SDP	Wayne Dixon	1,963	34.7	+11.1
Conservative	Samantha Bennett	913	16.2	+10.2
Green	Kay-Lee Asquith	306	5.4	+0.5
Liberal Democrats	James Spencer	119	2.1	−1.1
Majority		350	6.2	−13.4
Turnout		5,653	27.8	+5.4
Labour hold		Swing		

=== May 2019 ===
2019
Party	Candidate	Votes	%	±%
Labour	Paul Truswell*	1,879	43.2	−17.9
SDP	Wayne Dixon	1,027	23.6	+1.3
UKIP	Will Lockwood	831	19.1	+19.1
Conservative	Hugh Findlay	259	6.0	−5.3
Green	Eunice Delali Agbemafle	212	4.9	+4.9
Liberal Democrats	Robert Jacques	137	3.2	−2.1
Majority		852	19.6	−27.0
Turnout		4,362	22.4	−1.2
Labour hold		Swing	-9.6	

=== May 2018 ===
2018
Party	Candidate	Votes	%	±%
Labour	Kim Groves*	3,373	61.1	+12.2
Labour	Judith Blake*	2,747		
Labour	Paul Truswell*	2,366		
SDP	Wayne Dixon	1,232	22.3	+9.7
Conservative	David Herdson	621	11.3	+4.9
Conservative	Rita Jessop	613		
Conservative	Gareth Lamb	451		
Liberal Democrats	Kathryn Gagen	293	5.3	+3.2
Majority		2,141	46.6	+25.0
Turnout		4,594	23.6	+1.3
Labour hold		Swing		
Labour hold		Swing		
Labour hold		Swing		

=== May 2016 ===
2016
Party	Candidate	Votes	%	±%
Labour	Paul Truswell*	2,285	48.9	−1.3
UKIP	Craig Sweaton	1,278	27.4	−2.7
Independent	Wayne Dixon	605	13.0	+13.0
Conservative	Hugh Findlay	300	6.4	−5.9
Green	Fiona Sarah Heather Love	104	2.2	−0.7
Liberal Democrats	Sadie Fisher	99	2.1	−0.3
Majority		1,007	21.6	−0.5
Turnout		4,671	25.3	+4.2
Labour hold		Swing		

=== May 2015 ===
2015
Party	Candidate	Votes	%	±%
Labour	Judith Blake*	4,974	51.2	−13.3
UKIP	Craig Sweaton	2,921	30.1	+30.1
Conservative	Zena Lopez	1,199	12.3	−0.9
Green	Fiona Love	280	2.9	+2.9
Liberal Democrats	Sadie Fisher	237	2.4	−2.5
Left Unity	Nick Jones	103	1.1	+1.1
Majority		2,053	21.1	−26.0
Turnout		9,714	51.0	
Labour hold		Swing	-21.7	

=== May 2014 ===
2014
Party	Candidate	Votes	%	±%
Labour	Kim Groves*	2,489		
UKIP	Craig Sweaton	1,756		
British Democrats	Kevin Meeson	358		
Conservative	Barbara Harpham	287		
Green	Austen Thompson	219		
Liberal Democrats	Sadie Fisher	79		
Majority				
Turnout			28.04	
Labour hold		Swing		

=== May 2012 ===
2012
Party	Candidate	Votes	%	±%
Labour	Paul Truswell	2,696	64.3	−0.2
BNP	Kevin Meeson	893	21.3	+3.9
Conservative	James McFarland	412	9.8	−3.4
Liberal Democrats	Sadie Fisher	191	4.6	−0.4
Majority		1,803	43.0	−4.1
Turnout		4,192		
Labour hold		Swing	-2.0	

=== May 2011 ===
2011
Party	Candidate	Votes	%	±%
Labour	Judith Blake*	3,313	64.5	+15.3
BNP	Kevin Meeson	892	17.4	−3.2
Conservative	James McFarland	679	13.2	−1.0
Liberal Democrats	Sadie Fisher	252	4.9	−8.5
Majority		2,421	47.1	+18.5
Turnout		5,136	28	
Labour hold		Swing	+9.2	

=== May 2010 ===
2010
Party	Candidate	Votes	%	±%
Labour	Kim Groves	4,477	49.2	+10.9
BNP	Kevin Meeson	1,875	20.6	−16.8
Conservative	James McFarland	1,292	14.2	+0.0
Liberal Democrats	Beth Fisher	1,222	13.4	+3.3
Green	James Fell	231	2.5	+2.5
Majority		2,602	28.6	+27.6
Turnout		9,097	50.9	+21.5
Labour hold		Swing	+13.8	

== See also ==
- Listed buildings in Leeds (Middleton Park Ward)
