= Adel and Wharfedale (ward) =

Electoral ward in Leeds, England

- Adel and Wharfedale highlighted within Leeds
- Population: 16,606 (2023 electorate)
- Metropolitan borough: City of Leeds
- Metropolitan county: West Yorkshire
- Region: Yorkshire and the Humber
- Country: England
- Sovereign state: United Kingdom
- UK Parliament: Leeds North West
- Councillors: David Stoddart-Scott (Conservative); Lee Farmer; Billy Flynn (Conservative)

Adel and Wharfedale is an electoral ward of Leeds City Council in the north west of Leeds, West Yorkshire, covering both urban and rural areas including Adel, Bramhope, Cookridge, Holt Park, and Pool-in-Wharfedale.

== Boundaries ==
The Adel and Wharfedale ward includes the civil parishes of:

- Arthington
- Bramhope (part of Bramhope and Carlton Parish Council, although Carlton Parish sits in Otley and Yeadon ward)
- Pool-in-Wharfedale (Pool Parish Council)

== Councillors ==
Election	Councillor	Councillor	Councillor
2004	Barry Anderson (Con) (Note: Anderson had been a ward councillor for Cookridge ward since 1999.)	Les Carter (Con) (Note: Carter had previously been a ward councillor for Cookridge and Weetwood ward from 1973 to 1980 and then Cookridge ward until 2004.)	Clive Fox (Con) (Note: Fox had been a ward councillor for Otley and Wharfedale ward since 2000.)
2006	Barry Anderson (Con)	Les Carter (Con)	Clive Fox (Con)
2007	Barry Anderson (Con)	Les Carter (Con)	Clive Fox (Con)
2008	Barry Anderson (Con)	Les Carter (Con)	Clive Fox (Con)
2010	Barry Anderson (Con)	Les Carter (Con)	Clive Fox (Con)
2011	Barry Anderson (Con)	Les Carter (Con)	Clive Fox (Con)
2012	Barry Anderson (Con)	Les Carter (Con)	Clive Fox (Con) (Note: Fox died in office on 8 April 2014, less than a month before his seat was up for election. No by-election was called and Billy Flynn was elected at the council election.)
2014	Barry Anderson (Con)	Les Carter (Con)	Billy Flynn (Con)
2015	Barry Anderson (Con)	Caroline Anderson (Con)	Billy Flynn (Con)
2016	Barry Anderson (Con)	Caroline Anderson (Con)	Billy Flynn (Con)
2018	Barry Anderson (Con)	Caroline Anderson (Con)	Billy Flynn (Con)
2019	Barry Anderson (Con)	Caroline Anderson (Con)	Billy Flynn (Con)
2021	Barry Anderson (Con)	Caroline Anderson (Con)	Billy Flynn (Con)
2022	Barry Anderson (Con)	Caroline Anderson (Con)	Billy Flynn (Con)
2023	Barry Anderson (Con)	Caroline Anderson (Con)	Billy Flynn (Con)
2024	Barry Anderson (Con)	Caroline Anderson (Con)	Billy Flynn (Con)
2026	David Stoddart-Scott* (Con)	Lee Farmer* (Con)	Billy Flynn* (Con)

indicates seat up for re-election. indicates seat up for election following resignation or death of sitting councillor. * indicates incumbent councillor.

== Elections since 2010 ==
=== May 2026 ===
2026 (2 seats)
Party	Candidate	Votes	%	±%
Conservative	David Stoddart-Scott	2,462	28.7	▼15.3
Conservative	Lee Farmer	2,452	28.6	▼15.4
Labour Co-op	Jemima Bostock	1,923	22.4	▼12.0
Reform	Craig Gabbitas	1,874	21.8	New
Reform	Michael Lowry	1,833	21.3	New
Labour Co-op	Nathan James Ramsden	1,675	19.5	▼14.9
Green	Gordon Richard Howe	1,300	15.1	▲8.3
Green	Dominic Daniel Jack Seaward	1,265	14.7	▲8.0
Liberal Democrats	Fiona Allen	1,004	11.7	▲0.4
Liberal Democrats	Ray Smith	668	7.8	▼3.5
Majority		529	6.3	▼3.3
Turnout		8,588	50.4	▲6.0
Rejected ballots		18	0.2	
Registered electors		17,043		
Conservative hold		Swing		
Conservative hold		Swing		

=== May 2024 ===
2024
Party	Candidate	Votes	%	±%
Conservative	Caroline Anderson*	3,274	44.0	+0.2
Labour	Jane Orton	2,563	34.4	+5.1
Liberal Democrats	Sharon Slinger	838	11.3	−7.8
Green	Fiona Love	503	6.8	−1.1
Yorkshire	Corey Robinson	228	3.1	New
Majority		711	5.6	−8.9
Turnout		7,442	44.4	+1.8
Conservative hold		Swing	-2.4	

=== May 2023 ===
2023
Party	Candidate	Votes	%	±%
Conservative	Billy Flynn*	3,087	43.8	−12.5
Labour Co-op	Steve Clapcote	2,064	29.3	+2.3
Liberal Democrats	Sharon Slinger	1,343	19.1	+10.6
Green	Fiona Love	554	7.9	+1.7
Majority		1,023	14.5	−14.8
Turnout		7,076	42.6	−4.7
Conservative hold		Swing		

=== May 2022 ===
2022
Party	Candidate	Votes	%	±%
Conservative	Barry Anderson*	4,385	56.3	+0.7
Labour	Chris Bridges	2,104	27.0	+2.7
Liberal Democrats	Mark Twitchett	663	8.5	−4.0
Green	Fiona Love	486	6.2	−0.7
Yorkshire	Corey Robinson	127	1.6	N/A
Majority		2,281	29.3	−2.0
Turnout		7,793	47.3	−2.7
Conservative hold		Swing		

=== May 2021 ===
2021
Party	Candidate	Votes	%	±%
Conservative	Caroline Anderson*	4,527	55.6	+9.0
Labour	Chris Bridges	1,975	24.3	+4.8
Liberal Democrats	Michael White	1,022	12.5	−5.8
Green	Lesley Jeffries	566	6.9	−0.9
Majority		2,552	31.3	+4.2
Turnout		8,144	50.0	+9.1
Conservative hold		Swing		

=== May 2019 ===
2019
Party	Candidate	Votes	%	±%
Conservative	Billy Flynn*	2,952	46.6	−14.9
Labour	Nigel Gill	1,235	19.5	−0.2
Liberal Democrats	Ian Dowling	1,159	18.3	+6.0
Green	Lesley Jeffries	491	7.8	+0.3
UKIP	Andrew Greenwood	491	7.8	+7.8
Majority		1,717	27.1	−14.3
Turnout		6,352	40.1	−5.1
Conservative hold		Swing	-7.4	

=== May 2018 ===
2018
Party	Candidate	Votes	%	±%
Conservative	Barry Anderson*	4,856	61.5	+3.1
Conservative	Caroline Anderson*	4,269		
Conservative	Billy Flynn*	3,881		
Labour	Nigel Gill	1,556	19.7	+1.7
Labour	Geraldine Montgomerie	1,435		
Labour	Andy Rontree	1,264		
Liberal Democrats	Peter Jackson	977	12.3	−1.1
Liberal Democrats	Jane Trewhella	883		
Liberal Democrats	Ed Thornley	715		
Green	Liddy Swales	591	7.5	+3.5
Majority		3,300	41.4	+1.0
Turnout		15,984	45.2	−0.3
Conservative hold		Swing		
Conservative hold		Swing		
Conservative hold		Swing		

=== May 2016 ===
2016
Party	Candidate	Votes	%	±%
Conservative	Barry Anderson*	4,125	58.4	+12.3
Labour	Paul Wray	1,270	18.0	−0.6
Liberal Democrats	Cheryl Kebede	948	13.4	−8.4
UKIP	Glenn Morley	440	6.2	−1.5
Green	Emma Carter	281	4.0	−1.8
Majority		2,855	40.4	+16.0
Turnout		7,064	45.5	
Conservative hold		Swing		

=== May 2015 ===
2015
Party	Candidate	Votes	%	±%
Conservative	Caroline Anderson	5,534	46.1	−4.1
Liberal Democrats	Cheryl Kebede	2,611	21.8	+0.5
Labour	Mark Henley	2,236	18.6	−2.0
UKIP	Malcolm Steele	926	7.7	+3.9
Green	Emma Carter	696	5.8	+1.7
Majority		2,923	24.4	−4.5
Turnout		12,003	75.2	
Conservative hold		Swing	-2.3	

=== May 2014 ===
2014
Party	Candidate	Votes	%	±%
Conservative	Billy Flynn	3,018	44.5	−1.0
Labour	Mark Henley	1,312	19.3	+3.5
Liberal Democrats	Cheryl Kebede	1,154	17.0	−20.7
UKIP	Mal Steele	966	14.2	+13.5
Green	Paul Marchant	336	5.0	+2.3
Majority		1,706		
Turnout		6,786		
Conservative hold		Swing		

=== May 2012 ===
2012
Party	Candidate	Votes	%	±%
Conservative	Barry Anderson*	3,674	52.9	+2.7
Labour	Nigel Gill	1,301	18.7	−1.9
Liberal Democrats	Christina Shaw	1,202	17.3	−4.0
UKIP	Claire Wilson-Sharp	486	7.0	+3.2
Green	Paul Marchant	217	3.1	−1.0
Alliance for Green Socialism	Gareth Christie	71	1.0	+1.0
Majority		2,373	34.1	+5.2
Turnout		6,951		
Conservative hold		Swing	+2.3	

=== May 2011 ===
2011
Party	Candidate	Votes	%	±%
Conservative	Leslie Carter*	4,144	50.2	+7.0
Liberal Democrats	Christine Shaw	1,758	21.3	−15.5
Labour	Nigel Gill	1,701	20.6	+5.7
Green	Paul Marchant	337	4.1	+1.7
UKIP	Claire Wilson-Sharp	315	3.8	+3.8
Majority		2,386	28.9	+22.5
Turnout		8,255	52	
Conservative hold		Swing	+11.2	

=== May 2010 ===
2010
Party	Candidate	Votes	%	±%
Conservative	Clive Fox*	5,292	43.2	−14.4
Liberal Democrats	Christina Shaw	4,508	36.8	+10.2
Labour	Nigel Gill	1,822	14.9	+5.3
BNP	Doreen Dawson	332	2.7	−0.8
Green	Paul Marchant	291	2.4	−0.3
Majority		784	6.4	−24.6
Turnout		12,245	77.2	+29.6
Conservative hold		Swing	-12.3	

== See also ==
- Listed buildings in Leeds (Adel and Wharfedale Ward)
