= Judith Blake, Baroness Blake of Leeds =

British Labour Party politician (born 1953)

The Right Honourable The Baroness Blake of Leeds CBE
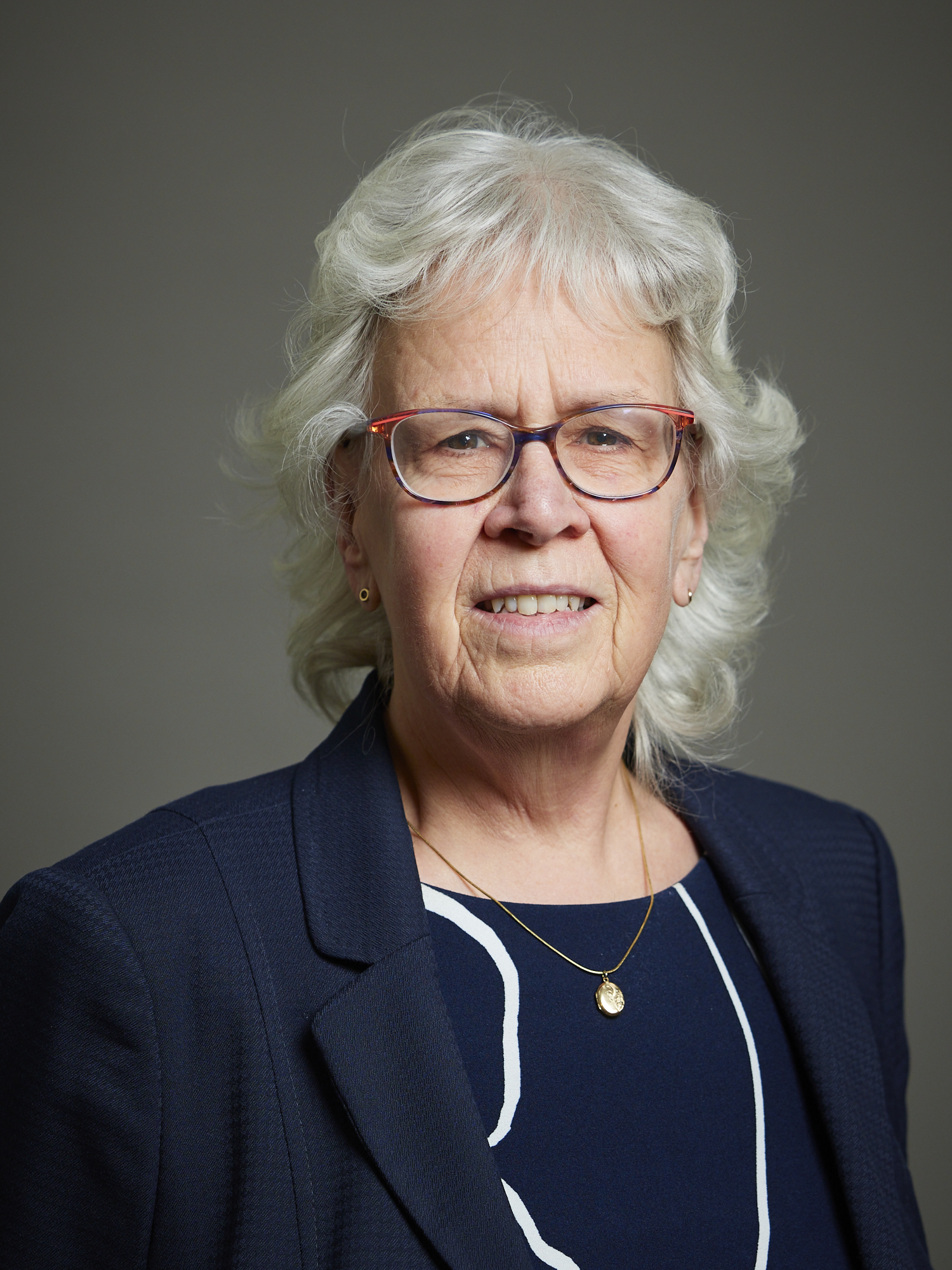
- Official portrait, 2024

Parliamentary Under-Secretary of State for Building Safety, Fire and Resilience
- Incumbent
- Assumed office 22 July 2026
- Prime Minister: Andy Burnham
- Preceded by: Samantha Dixon

Baroness-in-Waiting Government Whip
- Incumbent
- Assumed office 11 July 2024
- Prime Minister: Keir Starmer; Andy Burnham

Member of the House of Lords
- Lord Temporal
- Life peerage 1 February 2021
Shadow portfolios
2021–2024	Energy Security and Net Zero
2021–2024	Business and Trade
2021–2023	Whip
2021–2021	Levelling Up, Housing and Communities

Leader of Leeds City Council
- In office 21 May 2015 – 24 February 2021
- Preceded by: Keith Wakefield
- Succeeded by: James Lewis

Member of Leeds City Council for Middleton Park Hunslet (2002–2004)
- In office 2 May 2002 – 6 May 2021
- Preceded by: Mark Davies
- Succeeded by: Sharon Burke

Member of Leeds City Council for Weetwood
- In office 2 May 1996 – 4 May 2000
- Preceded by: Ann Castle
- Succeeded by: James Souper

Personal details
- Born: Judith Vivienne Parsons; 23 July 1953 (age 73) Leeds, England
- Party: Labour
- Children: 4, including Olivia
- Education: Leeds Girls High School
- Alma mater: University of Kent

Judith Vivienne Blake, Baroness Blake of Leeds CBE (née Parsons; born 23 July 1953) is a British Labour politician serving as a life peer in the House of Lords since 2021. She serves as a Baroness-in-Waiting (Government Whip) in the House of Lords.

Blake served as the leader of Leeds City Council from 2015 to 2021, being the first woman to hold the position.

== Personal life ==
Blake was born on 23 July 1953 into a Methodist family in Leeds. Both her parents were doctors. She attended Leeds Girls High School until 1971 and then studied history at the University of Kent.

After university, she began her career in education and social policy, living in London and then Birmingham in the 1980s. During her time living in Birmingham, she taught the English language to refugees. In 1992, she returned to live in Otley.

Blake has four children. Her youngest child, Olivia Blake, was elected as the Member of Parliament for Sheffield Hallam in 2019.

== Political career ==
Blake was elected as an Otley town councillor, and, except for a two-year gap after losing her seat in Weetwood at the 2000 city council election, has been an elected member of Leeds City Council since 1996.

She contested the Leeds North West constituency in the 2005 and 2010 national elections as the Labour Party's prospective parliamentary candidate. In 2005 she came second behind Greg Mulholland of the Liberal Democrats; in 2010, she fell to third behind Julia Mulligan of the Conservatives and re-elected MP Mulholland.

Following her selection as deputy leader of the Leeds Labour group in 2003, once the party regained control of Leeds in 2010, Blake served as the Deputy Leader of the Council for five years to 2015. She was the Executive Cabinet Member for Children & Families during this period, overseeing the city's Children's Services' Ofsted rating change from "inadequate" to "good overall". She has been involved in a number of national legal campaigns, worked with education authorities in Yorkshire to raise school standards in the area, and worked on crises and issues with student grades and school placements throughout her career.

She voted for Yvette Cooper in the 2015 Labour Party leadership election and supported Keir Starmer in the 2020 leadership election.

=== Leader of Leeds City Council ===
After then-leader Keith Wakefield stepped down, Blake was elected as the first woman leader of Leeds City Council in May 2015. She chaired the Council's Executive Board, having also served on the boards for NHS Leeds and the West Yorkshire Police Authority. In April 2019, Blake was appointed to the board of Northern Ballet. During her time as leader she was a key proponent of a public art project to celebrate the women of Leeds, which culminated in the unveiling of Ribbons by Pippa Hale in 2024.

In December 2015, she expressed the frustration of city residents in feeling that David Cameron, then the prime minister of the United Kingdom, was giving greater attention to more affluent counties in southern England during a period of severe flooding.

== House of Lords ==
In December 2020, it was announced Blake would be conferred a Life Peerage after a nomination by Labour Party Leader Keir Starmer. In February 2021, she was created Baroness Blake of Leeds, of Gledhow in the City of Leeds.

Blake joined the opposition front bench in May 2021, as a Shadow Spokesperson for Housing, Communities and Local Government and an Opposition Whip. In December 2021 she became Shadow Spokesperson for Business, Energy and Industrial Strategy and International Trade, and in February 2023 she became Shadow Spokesperson for Energy and Net Zero and Shadow Spokesperson for Business and Trade. On 11 July 2024, she became a Baroness-In-Waiting (Government Whip) in the House of Lords.

On 14 August 2026, she was appointed Fire Minister amid widespread wildfires.

== Recognition ==
She was awarded a Commander of the Order of the British Empire (CBE) in the 2017 Birthday Honours.

Blake's name is one of those featured on the sculpture Ribbons, unveiled in 2024. She had been a key proponent of a public art project to celebrate the women of Leeds, which culminated in the unveiling of Ribbons.

== Electoral history ==
UK local elections
Date of election	Ward	Party	Votes	% of votes	Result
1996 Leeds City Council election	Weetwood	Labour	2,569	40.2	Elected
2000 Leeds City Council election	Weetwood	Labour	2,023	36.3	Not Elected
2002 Leeds City Council election	Hunslet	Labour	1,535	68.2	Elected
2004 Leeds City Council election	Middleton Park	Labour	2,111	40.9	Elected
2007 Leeds City Council election	Middleton Park	Labour	2,467	46.7	Elected
2011 Leeds City Council election	Middleton Park	Labour	3,313	64.5	Elected
2015 Leeds City Council election	Middleton Park	Labour	4,974	51.2	Elected
2018 Leeds City Council election	Middleton Park	Labour	2,747	61.1	Elected

UK parliamentary elections
Date of election	Constituency	Party	Votes	% of votes	Result
2005 general election	Leeds North West	Labour	14,735	33.0	Not Elected
2010 general election	Leeds North West	Labour	9,132	21.0	Not Elected
