= 2024 Leeds City Council election =

2024 election in West Yorkshire, England

- 2 May 2024

33 of 99 seats on Leeds City Council 50 seats needed for a majority
- Turnout: 34.2% (▲3.0%)

	First party	Second party	Third party
Leader	James Lewis	Alan Lamb	David Blackburn
Party	Labour	Conservative	Green
Last election	22 seats, 44.4%	4 seats, 22.3%	1 seats, 14.2%
Seats before	61	18	3
Seats won	19	5	3
Seats after	61	15 (Note: Seat count includes Trish Smith (Pudsey), who resigned from the Conservatives the day following the election.)	5
Seat change	Steady	▼3	▲2
Popular vote	85,055	40,327	32,085
Percentage	43.3%	20.5%	16.3%
Swing	▼1.1pp	▼1.8pp	▲2.1pp
	Fourth party	Fifth party	Sixth party
Leader	Stewart Golton	Robert Finnigan	Mark Dobson
Party	Liberal Democrats	Morley Borough Independents	Garforth and Swillington Independents
Last election	2 seats, 10.6%	2 seats, 2.5%	1 seat, 1.9%
Seats before	6	4	3
Seats won	2	2	1
Seats after	6	4	3
Seat change	Steady	Steady	Steady
Popular vote	18,527	4,538	3,469
Percentage	9.4%	2.3%	1.8%
Swing	▼1.2pp	▼0.2pp	▼0.1pp
	Seventh party	Eighth party	Ninth party
Leader	Wayne Dixon
Party	SDP	Yorkshire	Reform
Last election	1 seat, 1.4%	0 seats, 1.1%	0 seats, 0.4%
Seats before	2	0	0
Seats won	1	0	0
Seats after	3	0	0
Seat change	▲1	Steady	Steady
Popular vote	3,173	4,064	2,613
Percentage	1.6%	2.1%	1.3%
Swing	▲0.2pp	▲1.0pp	▲0.9pp
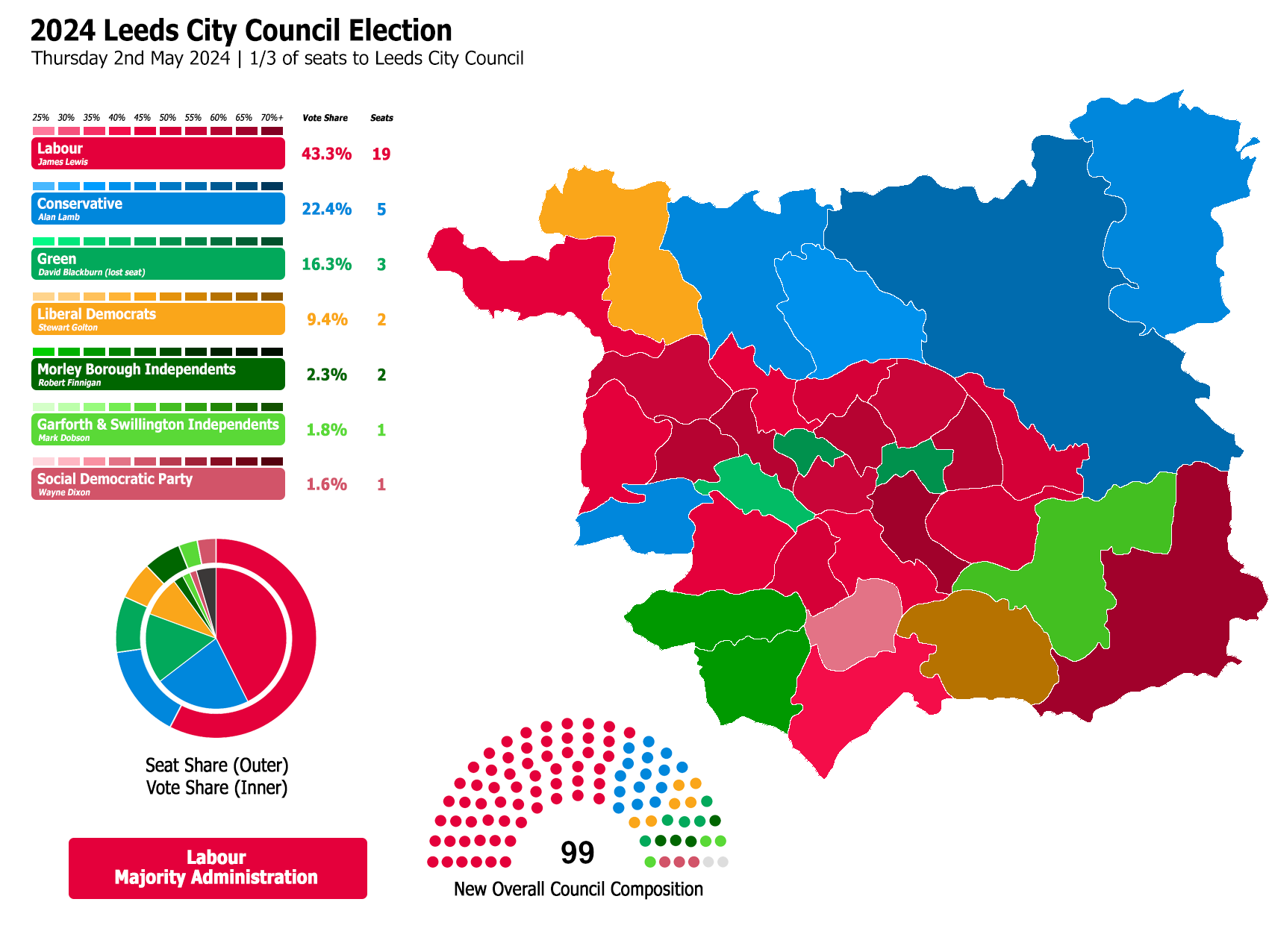
- Map of Leeds City Council wards
Leader before election
James Lewis
Labour
Leader after election
James Lewis
Labour

The 2024 Leeds City Council election was held on Thursday 2 May 2024. It was held on the same day as the second West Yorkshire mayoral election and other local elections across the United Kingdom.

The Labour Party maintained control of the council, with their seat count holding steady. For the third year in a row, the Conservative Party lost three seats, all to Labour; the party would additionally lose a seat in Pudsey two days after the election when Trish Smith, re-elected the previous year, resigned to sit as an independent. The Green Party also succeeded in taking three seats from Labour and saw the largest popular vote share increase out of any of the parties, though Labour in turn unseated Green group leader David Blackburn, preventing the Greens from equalling the Liberal Democrats as the third-largest group on the council, though the Greens subsequently won a seat back in a byelection in the same ward and Blackburn returned to the council. The Social Democratic Party took the third seat in Middleton Park, wiping out the Labour Party's representation in the ward, and all other parties held level in their seat count.

== Election summary ==
Leeds City Council Election Result 2024
Party	Candidates						Votes		
Party	Stood	Elected	Gained	Unseated	Net	% of total	%	No.	Net %
Labour	33	19	4	4	Steady	57.6	43.3	85,055	-1.1
Conservative	33	5	0	3	▼3	15.2	20.5	40,327	-1.8
Green	33	3	3	1	▲2	9.1	16.3	32,085	+2.1
Liberal Democrats	33	2	0	0	Steady	6.1	9.4	18,527	-1.2
Morley Borough Independent	2	2	0	0	Steady	6.1	2.3	4,538	-0.2
Yorkshire	12	0	0	0	Steady	0.0	2.1	4,064	+1.0
Garforth and Swillington Independents	1	1	0	0	Steady	3.0	1.8	3,469	-0.1
SDP	19	1	1	0	▲1	3.0	1.6	3,173	+0.2
Reform	6	0	0	0	Steady	0.0	1.3	2,613	+0.9
Independent	5	0	0	0	Steady	0.0	0.8	1,554	+0.4
TUSC	7	0	0	0	Steady	0.0	0.3	675	±0.0
Alliance for Green Socialism	1	0	0	0	Steady	0.0	0.1	222	±0.0
Total	185	33	4	4	Steady	100%	100%	197,671 (Note: Total votes includes 1,370 blank and invalid votes.)	

The election result had the following consequences for the political composition of the council:

Party	2023 election	Prior to election	New council
Labour	61	61	61
Conservative	18	18	15
Liberal Democrat	6	6	6
Morley Borough Independents	6	4	4
Garforth and Swillington Independents	3	3	3
Green	3	3	5
SDP	2	2	3
Independent	0	2 (Note: Two former Morley Borough Independents currently sit as independents: Wyn Kidger (Morley South) since March 2024 and Bob Gettings MBE (Morley North) since April.)	2
Total	99	99	99
Working majority	23	23	23

== Councillors not standing for re-election ==
Councillor/s not standing for re-election (4)
Councillor	Ward	First elected	Party	Reason	Successor
Gohar Almass	Beeston & Holbeck	2018	Labour	stood down	Shaf Ali (Labour)
Caroline Gruen	Bramley & Stanningley	2011	Labour	stood down	Adele Rae (Labour)
Andy Hutchison	Morley North	2018	Morley Borough Independents	stood down	Simon Brown (Morley Borough Independent)
James McKenna	Armley	1988	Labour	stood down	Lou Cunningham (Green)

== Results by ward ==
=== Adel & Wharfedale ===
Adel & Wharfedale
Party	Candidate	Votes	%	±%
Conservative	Caroline Anderson*	3,274	44.0	+0.2
Labour	Jane Orton	2,563	34.4	+5.1
Liberal Democrats	Sharon Slinger	838	11.3	−7.8
Green	Fiona Love	503	6.8	−1.1
Yorkshire	Corey Robinson	228	3.1	New
Majority		711	5.6	−8.9
Turnout		7,442	44.4	+1.8
Conservative hold		Swing	-2.4	

=== Alwoodley ===
Alwoodley
Party	Candidate	Votes	%	±%
Conservative	Neil Buckley*	3,390	48.9	−0.9
Labour	Jackie Ellis	2,368	34.1	−1.9
Green	Louise Jennings	520	7.5	+2.3
Liberal Democrats	Howard Foreman	481	6.9	+0.6
Yorkshire	Rio Goldhammer	176	2.5	±0.0
Majority		1,022	14.8	+1.0
Turnout		6,971	40.4	+3.1
Conservative hold		Swing	+0.5	

=== Ardsley & Robin Hood ===
Ardsley & Robin Hood
Party	Candidate	Votes	%	±%
Labour Co-op	Karen Bruce	2,240	41.4	−2.1
Conservative	Mike Foster*	1,455	26.9	+3.3
Liberal Democrats	Tom Leadley	907	16.8	−8.7
Yorkshire	Claire Buxton	449	8.3	New
Green	Alaric Hall	261	4.8	±0.0
SDP	Mark Daniels	102	1.9	±0.0
Majority		785	14.5	−3.5
Turnout		5,446	30.9	+1.3
Labour Co-op gain from Conservative		Swing	+0.6	

=== Armley ===
Armley
Party	Candidate	Votes	%	±%
Green	Lou Cunningham	2,113	43.8	+4.0
Labour	Richard Banks	2,041	42.3	−1.8
Conservative	Adam Westwood	321	6.7	−3.0
Yorkshire	Rachel Martins	205	4.2	New
Liberal Democrats	Dan Walker	105	2.2	−0.2
SDP	Warwick Bettney	41	0.8	New
Majority		72	1.5	−2.8
Turnout		4,861	28.5	+3.6
Green gain from Labour		Swing	+2.9	

=== Beeston & Holbeck ===
Beeston & Holbeck
Party	Candidate	Votes	%	±%
Labour	Shaf Ali	2,533	53.0	−9.9
Green	Matt Rogan	1,092	22.8	+6.1
Conservative	Bradley Chandler	572	12.0	+0.7
SDP	Sasha Watson	247	5.2	+2.5
Liberal Democrats	George Sykes	226	4.7	−0.6
TUSC	Louie Fulton	113	2.4	+1.3
Majority		1,441	30.2	−16.0
Turnout		4,783	25.9	+4.5
Labour hold		Swing	-8.0	

=== Bramley & Stanningley ===
Bramley & Stanningley
Party	Candidate	Votes	%	±%
Labour	Adele Rae	2,675	60.8	−1.4
Conservative	Adam Cook	632	14.4	−1.9
Green	Keith Whittaker	521	11.8	+2.8
Liberal Democrats	Liz Bee	487	11.1	−0.1
SDP	Richard Riley	82	1.9	+0.5
Majority		2,043	46.4	+0.5
Turnout		4,442	26.3	+1.2
Labour hold		Swing	+0.3	

=== Burmantofts & Richmond Hill ===
Burmantofts & Richmond Hill
Party	Candidate	Votes	%	±%
Labour Co-op	Asghar Khan*	2,752	65.5	−1.3
Green	Robert Wolff	363	8.6	−2.2
Yorkshire	Rob Lees	329	7.8	New
Conservative	Taiwo Adeyemi	328	7.8	+0.1
Liberal Democrats	David Hollingsworth	317	7.5	−2.8
TUSC	Richard Chaves-Sanderson	81	1.9	−0.4
SDP	Paul Whetstone	30	0.7	−0.8
Majority		2,389	56.9	+0.8
Turnout		4,231	24.9	+2.5
Labour hold		Swing	+0.5	

=== Calverley & Farsley ===
Calverley & Farsley
Party	Candidate	Votes	%	±%
Labour Co-op	Craig Timmins	3,514	46.3	−8.3
Conservative	Amanda Carter*	3,182	41.9	+6.6
Green	Ellen Graham	663	8.7	+5.2
Liberal Democrats	Stuart McLeod	234	3.1	+0.2
Majority		332	4.4	−14.9
Turnout		7,642	41.9	+3.0
Labour gain from Conservative		Swing	-7.5	

=== Chapel Allerton ===
Chapel Allerton
Party	Candidate	Votes	%	±%
Labour	Mohammed Rafique*	4,139	62.6	−10.8
Green	Bobak Walker	1,392	21.0	+9.2
Conservative	Kevin Black	409	6.2	−0.2
Alliance for Green Socialism	Mike Davies	222	3.4	+0.4
Yorkshire	Ryan Kett	212	3.2	New
Liberal Democrats	Majd Qahwaji	166	2.5	−1.5
SDP	Richard Cowles	75	1.1	+0.3
Majority		2,747	41.6	−20.1
Turnout		6,711	36.7	+3.5
Labour hold		Swing	-10.0	

=== Cross Gates & Whinmoor ===
Cross Gates & Whinmoor
Party	Candidate	Votes	%	±%
Labour	James Gibson*	2,865	53.2	−0.4
Conservative	Max Holley	1,164	21.6	−7.9
Reform	Graham Sunley	461	8.6	New
Yorkshire	Howard Dews	314	5.8	New
Green	Martin Hemingway	296	5.5	−0.2
Liberal Democrats	Noah Allerton	288	5.3	+0.9
Majority		1,701	31.6	+2.8
Turnout		5,418	30.0	+1.2
Labour hold		Swing	+3.8	

=== Farnley & Wortley ===
Farnley & Wortley
Party	Candidate	Votes	%	±%
Labour Co-op	Kate Haigh	2,222	45.7	−3.1
Green	David Blackburn*	1,717	35.4	+2.4
Conservative	Daisy George	613	12.6	+1.8
Liberal Democrats	Peter Andrews	229	4.7	+3.4
SDP	Finley Taylor	76	1.6	+1.3
Majority		505	10.3	−5.5
Turnout		4,907	27.0	−0.3
Labour Co-op gain from Green		Swing	-2.8	

=== Garforth & Swillington ===
Garforth & Swillington
Party	Candidate	Votes	%	±%
Garforth and Swillington Independents	Sarah Field*	3,469	54.3	+0.3
Labour	Alex Rayment	1,223	19.2	−0.6
Conservative	Peter Bentley	778	12.8	−1.6
Reform	Kieran White	336	5.3	New
Green	Patrick Lynott	266	4.2	−1.9
Liberal Democrats	Jake Knox	209	3.3	+0.2
Independent	Tyler Wilson-Kerr	105	1.6	−0.8
Majority		2,246	35.1	+0.9
Turnout		6,424	39.9	+0.7
Garforth and Swillington Independents hold		Swing	+0.5	

=== Gipton & Harehills ===
Gipton & Harehills
Party	Candidate	Votes	%	±%
Green	Mothin Ali	3,070	51.6	+20.4
Labour	Arif Hussain*	2,323	39.0	−16.9
Conservative	Liam Roberts	285	4.8	−2.1
Liberal Democrats	Thomas Race	156	2.6	−0.7
TUSC	Iain Dalton	120	2.0	−0.5
Majority		747	12.6	−12.0
Turnout		5,954	33.1	+6.6
Green gain from Labour		Swing	+18.7	

=== Guiseley & Rawdon ===
Guiseley & Rawdon
Party	Candidate	Votes	%	±%
Labour Co-op	Sonia Leighton	3,604	46.6	−0.2
Conservative	Paul Alderson*	2,782	36.0	−1.3
Yorkshire	Bob Buxton	672	8.7	+1.2
Green	Lucy Wheeler	363	4.7	+0.3
Liberal Democrats	Helen Page	316	4.1	+0.4
Majority		822	10.6	+1.1
Turnout		3,639	42.4	+0.2
Labour Co-op gain from Conservative		Swing	+0.6	

=== Harewood ===
Harewood
Party	Candidate	Votes	%	±%
Conservative	Sam Firth*	3,619	58.8	−0.8
Labour	Simon Dowling	1,560	25.4	+1.9
Green	Claire Evans	675	11.0	+1.0
Liberal Democrats	Jonathan Levy	299	4.9	−1.6
Majority		2,059	33.4	−2.8
Turnout		6,212	41.8	+0.2
Conservative hold		Swing	-1.4	

=== Headingley & Hyde Park ===
Headingley & Hyde Park
Party	Candidate	Votes	%	±%
Green	Tim Goodall	2,668	51.2	+9.4
Labour	Al Garthwaite*	2,138	41.0	−7.5
Liberal Democrats	Amar Karim	158	3.0	−0.5
Conservative	Steven Rowley	120	2.3	−0.5
TUSC	Florian Hynam	71	1.4	+0.3
Independent	Anthony Greaux	55	1.1	+0.5
Majority		530	10.2	+3.5
Turnout		5,247	24.2	+7.6
Green gain from Labour		Swing	+8.5	

=== Horsforth ===
Horsforth
Party	Candidate	Votes	%	±%
Labour	John Garvani*	4,388	56.6	+5.2
Conservative	Chris Calvert	1,971	25.4	−5.6
Green	William Jones	565	7.3	−0.5
Yorkshire	Ian Cowling	414	5.3	+2.1
Liberal Democrats	Roderic Parker	367	4.7	−1.8
SDP	Nathan Wright	41	0.5	New
Majority		2,417	31.2	+11.0
Turnout		7,776	43.8	+2.2
Labour hold		Swing	+5.4	

=== Hunslet & Riverside ===
Hunslet & Riverside
Party	Candidate	Votes	%	±%
Labour Co-op	Mohammed Iqbal*	2,274	46.2	−2.2
Green	Omar Mushtaq	2,067	42.0	+0.2
Conservative	Tamas Kovacs	247	5.0	−0.3
Liberal Democrats	Benjamin Dale	185	3.8	+1.7
SDP	Daniel Whetstone	107	2.2	+1.1
TUSC	Oisín Duncan	43	0.9	+0.3
Majority		207	4.2	−2.4
Turnout		4,965	28.5	+4.2
Labour hold		Swing	-1.2	

=== Killingbeck & Seacroft ===
Killingbeck & Seacroft
Party	Candidate	Votes	%	±%
Labour	David Jenkins*	2,551	61.3	−2.8
Conservative	Rosemary Gaskell	481	11.6	−6.1
Reform	Jayne Dresser	435	10.5	New
Green	John Arnison	407	9.8	+0.1
Liberal Democrats	John Otley	183	4.4	−3.3
SDP	Catherine Dobson	106	2.5	New
Majority		2,070	49.7	+3.3
Turnout		4,190	22.7	+1.9
Labour hold		Swing	+1.7	

=== Kippax & Methley ===
Kippax & Methley
Party	Candidate	Votes	%	±%
Labour	James Lewis*	3,570	65.1	+5.0
Conservative	Connor Mulhall	1,067	19.5	−6.4
Green	Angela Oldershaw	449	8.2	+0.5
Liberal Democrats	Greg Holden	401	7.3	+1.6
Majority		2,503	45.6	+11.4
Turnout		5,563	31.6	+1.5
Labour hold		Swing	+5.7	

=== Kirkstall ===
Kirkstall
Party	Candidate	Votes	%	±%
Labour	Fiona Venner*	3,451	62.3	−1.7
Green	Victoria Smith	1,137	20.5	+1.7
Conservative	Lyall Ainscow	321	5.8	−2.7
Liberal Democrats	Adam Belcher	288	5.2	−0.9
Independent	Stuart Long	204	3.7	+1.7
TUSC	John Tival	138	2.5	New
Majority		2,314	41.8	−3.4
Turnout		5,586	35.1	+5.9
Labour hold		Swing	-1.7	

=== Little London & Woodhouse ===
Little London & Woodhouse
Party	Candidate	Votes	%	±%
Labour	Javaid Akhtar*	2,194	59.8	−6.5
Green	Leon Zadok	808	22.0	+6.8
Conservative	Pauline Barron	297	8.1	−1.0
Liberal Democrats	Ghaffar Karim	260	7.1	+1.4
TUSC	Anthony Bracuti	109	3.0	−0.3
Majority		1386	37.8	−13.3
Turnout		3715	23.3	+5.6
Labour hold		Swing	-6.7	

=== Middleton Park ===
Middleton Park
Party	Candidate	Votes	%	±%
SDP	Rob Chesterfield	1,882	42.8	−3.1
Labour	Sharon Burke*	1,638	37.3	+0.6
Green	Julie Gill	402	9.2	+4.9
Conservative	Samson Adeyemi	332	7.6	−1.1
Liberal Democrats	Michael Follows	139	3.2	+1.2
Majority		244	5.5	−3.7
Turnout		4,423	22.2	+0.8
SDP gain from Labour		Swing	-1.8	

=== Moortown ===
Moortown
Party	Candidate	Votes	%	±%
Labour Co-op	Sharon Hamilton*	3,849	53.5	−4.0
Green	Rachel Hartshorne	1,298	18.0	+5.0
Conservative	Lee Farmer	992	13.8	−3.9
Liberal Democrats	Darren Finlay	678	9.4	+1.3
Yorkshire	David Stephens	344	4.8	+1.5
SDP	Cordelia Lynan	39	0.5	New
Majority		2,551	35.5	−3.9
Turnout		7,266	42.3	+2.9
Labour hold		Swing	-4.5	

=== Morley North ===
Morley North
Party	Candidate	Votes	%	±%
Morley Borough Independent	Simon Brown	2,317	37.8	−5.8
Labour Co-op	Stuart Bruce	1,529	25.0	+0.1
Independent	Jill Gettings-Bellhouse	998	16.3	New
Conservative	Lalit Suryawanshi	780	12.7	−2.4
Green	Evelyn Jeffries	285	4.7	−0.9
Liberal Democrats	James Trueman	197	3.2	−2.5
SDP	Thomas Foster	19	0.3	−0.1
Majority		788	12.8	−5.8
Turnout		6,154	33.7	+3.0
Morley Borough Independent hold		Swing	-2.9	

=== Morley South ===
Morley South
Party	Candidate	Votes	%	±%
Morley Borough Independent	Jane Senior*	2,221	38.0	−3.4
Labour Co-op	Charlotte Hill	1,824	31.2	+1.4
Conservative	Alexander Giles	560	9.6	−5.2
Green	Chris Bell	521	8.9	±0.0
Reform	James Kendall	407	7.0	New
Independent	Phil Bennett	192	3.3	New
Liberal Democrats	Mihai Barticel	93	1.6	−2.2
SDP	Nigel Perry	8	0.1	−0.7
Majority		397	6.8	−4.7
Turnout		5,878	32.4	+4.7
Morley Borough Independents hold		Swing	-2.4	

=== Otley & Yeadon ===
Otley & Yeadon
Party	Candidate	Votes	%	±%
Liberal Democrats	Sandy Lay*	3,455	46.9	+1.6
Labour Co-op	Ian McCargo	1,924	26.1	+1.6
Green	Mick Bradley	1,106	15.0	+1.6
Conservative	Jas Singh	491	6.7	−4.5
Yorkshire	Noah Libbish	392	5.3	+2.5
Majority		1,531	20.8	±0.0
Turnout		7,403	42.2	+3.7
Liberal Democrats hold		Swing	±0.0	

=== Pudsey ===
Pudsey
Party	Candidate	Votes	%	±%
Conservative	Dawn Seary*	3,349	45.6	+1.5
Labour	Riaz Ahmed	2,977	40.5	−1.3
Green	Suzanne Ward	436	5.9	+0.1
Reform	Andrea Whitehead	431	5.9	+3.0
Liberal Democrats	Amy Glover	242	3.3	−1.8
Majority		372	5.1	+2.8
Turnout		7,462	39.2	+3.0
Conservative hold		Swing	+1.4	

=== Rothwell ===
Rothwell
Party	Candidate	Votes	%	±%
Liberal Democrats	Conrad Hart-Brooke*	3,540	62.1	+0.7
Labour Co-op	Timothy Dowd	1,253	22.0	+0.4
Conservative	Louisa Singh	340	6.0	−0.7
Yorkshire	Sean McDonald	329	5.8	+0.9
Green	Allen Sikoryn	193	3.3	−1.4
SDP	Sarah Welbourne	43	0.8	+0.4
Majority		2,287	40.1	+0.3
Turnout		5,731	36.7	+1.6
Liberal Democrats hold		Swing	+0.2	

=== Roundhay ===
Roundhay
Party	Candidate	Votes	%	±%
Labour	Lisa Martin*	4,040	55.4	−0.3
Green	Alan Anthoney	1,946	26.7	+4.8
Conservative	Shazar Ahad	840	11.5	−3.2
Liberal Democrats	Najeeb Iqbal	340	4.7	−2.4
SDP	Carl Richman	132	1.8	New
Majority		2,094	28.7	−5.1
Turnout		7,349	42.0	+3.9
Labour hold		Swing	-2.6	

=== Temple Newsam ===
Temple Newsam
Party	Candidate	Votes	%	±%
Labour Co-op	Helen Hayden*	2,760	52.4	+0.6
Conservative	Cormac Trigg	1,237	23.5	−8.9
Reform	David Dresser	543	10.3	New
Green	Nicola Dos Santos	379	7.2	+0.7
Liberal Democrats	Keith Norman	319	6.1	−1.3
SDP	Wendy Whetstone	33	0.6	−0.6
Majority		1,523	28.9	+9.5
Turnout		5,317	31.8	+1.5
Labour hold		Swing	+4.8	

=== Weetwood ===
Weetwood
Party	Candidate	Votes	%	±%
Labour Co-op	Emma Flint*	3,337	49.6	+3.0
Liberal Democrats	Chris Howley	2,195	32.6	−5.5
Green	Chris Foren	758	11.3	+3.0
Conservative	Luca Perricone	371	5.5	−0.7
SDP	Rob Walker	67	1.0	+0.3
Majority		1,142	17.0	+8.5
Turnout		6,762	43.3	+1.1
Labour hold		Swing	+4.3	

=== Wetherby ===
Wetherby
Party	Candidate	Votes	%	±%
Conservative	Alan Lamb*	3,727	49.2	+10.9
Green	Anna Jacobs	2,845	37.5	−15.4
Labour	David Bowgett	736	9.7	+3.2
Liberal Democrats	Lesley McIntee	229	3.0	+0.9
SDP	Ian Howell	43	0.6	New
Majority		882	11.7	−2.8
Turnout		7,603	45.9	−0.2
Conservative hold		Swing	+13.2	

== Changes between 2024 and 2026 ==
=== By-elections ===
Farnley and Wortley by-election 10 October 2024 replacing Mark Sewards (resigned)
Party	Candidate	Votes	%	±%
Green	David Blackburn (Note: Blackburn previously represented Wortley and then Farnley and Wortley from 1998 until he lost his seat in May 2024.)	1,450	38.6	+3.2
Labour	Al Garthwaite (Note: Garthwaite previously represented Headingley and then Headingley and Hyde Park from 2016 until she lost her seat in May 2024. She served as the 129th Lord Mayor of Leeds.)	965	25.7	−20.0
Reform	David Dresser	912	24.3	N/A
Conservative	Lalit Suryawanshi	202	5.4	−7.2
Liberal Democrats	Peter Andrews	118	3.1	−1.6
Independent	Peter Allison	70	1.9	N/A
SDP	Richard Riley	26	0.7	−0.9
Majority		485	12.9	+2.6
Turnout		3,755	20.2	−6.8
Green gain from Labour		Swing	+11.6	

Morley South by-election 12 June 2025 replacing Wyn Kidger (resigned)
Party	Candidate	Votes	%	±%
Reform	Ryan Taylor	2,119	36.7	+29.7
Morley Borough Independents	Terry Grayshon	1,450	25.1	−13.0
Liberal Democrats	Michael Fox	1,009	17.5	+15.9
Labour Co-op	Charlotte Hill	634	11.0	−20.2
Green	Chris Bell	313	5.4	−3.5
Conservative	Liam Roberts	230	4.0	−5.6
Majority		669	11.6	+4.8
Turnout		5,767	31.7	−0.7
Reform gain from Morley Borough Independent		Swing	+21.4	

=== Defections and resignations ===
- May 2024: Trish Smith (Conservative) leaves party to sit as an independent
- August 2024: Mark Sewards (Labour) resigns – by-election held October 2024
- October 2024: David Blackburn (Green) gains by-election from Labour
- May 2025:
  - Winifred Kidger (Independent) (Note: Kidger was elected for the Morley Borough Independents) resigns - by-election held June 2025
  - Trish Smith (Independent) joins Reform
- June 2025:
  - Ryan Taylor (Reform) gains by-election nominally from Morley Borough Independents
  - Abigail Marshall Katung (Labour) leaves party to sit as an independent
- September 2025: Zara Hussain (Labour) leaves party to sit as an independent
- January 2026: Mahalia France-Mir (Labour) dies - seat left vacant until 2026 election
- March 2026: Nicole Lloyd (Labour) resigns
- March 2026: Caroline Anderson (Conservative) resigns
- March 2026: Robert Finnigan (Morley Borough Independent) resigns
