= Bramley and Stanningley (ward) =

Electoral ward in Leeds, England

- Bramley and Stanningley highlighted within Leeds
- Population: 17,176 (2023 electorate)
- Metropolitan borough: City of Leeds
- Metropolitan county: West Yorkshire
- Region: Yorkshire and the Humber
- Country: England
- Sovereign state: United Kingdom
- UK Parliament: Leeds West and Pudsey
- Councillors: Adele Rae (Labour); Tom Hinchcliffe (Labour); Kevin Ritchie (Labour)

Bramley and Stanningley is an electoral ward of Leeds City Council in west Leeds, West Yorkshire, covering the former industrial area of Bramley and district of Stanningley.

== Councillors since 1980 ==
Election	Councillor	Councillor	Councillor
Bramley (until 2004)
1980	Eric Atkinson (Lab) (Note: Eric Atkinson was first elected to represent the ward in 1946.)	Arthur Miller (Lab)	Denise Atkinson (Lab) (Note: Denise Atkinson was first elected to represent the ward in 1971.)
1982	Eric Atkinson (Lab)	Arthur Miller (Lab)	Denise Atkinson (Lab)
1983	Eric Atkinson (Lab)	Arthur Miller (Lab)	Denise Atkinson (Lab)
1984	Andrew Siantonas (Lab)	Arthur Miller (Lab)	Denise Atkinson (Lab)
1986	Andrew Siantonas (Lab)	Arthur Miller (Lab)	Denise Atkinson (Lab)
1987	Andrew Siantonas (Lab)	Arthur Miller (Lab)	Denise Atkinson (Lab)
1988	Cherrill Cliff (Lab)	Arthur Miller (Lab)	Denise Atkinson (Lab)
1990	Cherrill Cliff (Lab)	Arthur Miller (Lab)	Denise Atkinson (Lab)
1991	Cherrill Cliff (Lab)	Arthur Miller (Lab)	Denise Atkinson (Lab)
1992 by-election	Cherrill Cliff (Lab)	Stephen Pollard (Lab)	Denise Atkinson (Lab)
1992	Cherrill Cliff (Lab)	Stephen Pollard (Lab)	Denise Atkinson (Lab)
1994	Cherrill Cliff (Lab)	Stephen Pollard (Lab)	Denise Atkinson (Lab)
1995	Cherrill Cliff (Lab)	Angus Ross (Lab) (Note: Ross had previously served as a councillor for Pudsey North ward from 1990 to 1994.)	Denise Atkinson (Lab)
1996	Cherrill Cliff (Lab)	Angus Ross (Lab)	Denise Atkinson (Lab)
1998	Cherrill Cliff (Lab)	Angus Ross (Lab)	Denise Atkinson (Lab)
1998 by-election	Cherrill Cliff (Lab)	David Revett (LD)	Denise Atkinson (Lab)
1999	Cherrill Cliff (Lab)	Ian Howell (LD)	Denise Atkinson (Lab)
2000	Linda Sullivan (LD)	Ian Howell (LD)	Denise Atkinson MBE (Lab) (Note: Atkinson was awarded an MBE in the 2000 New Year Honours.)
2002	Linda Sullivan (LD)	Ian Howell (LD)	Denise Atkinson MBE (Lab)
2003	Linda Sullivan (LD)	Ted Hanley (Lab)	Denise Atkinson MBE (Lab)
Bramley and Stanningley (2004 to present)
2004	Neil Taggart (Lab) (Note: Taggart had previously been a Chapel Allerton ward councillor since 1980 until his election for Bramley and Stanningley ward in 2004.)	Ted Hanley (Lab) (Note: Hanley had served as a Bramley ward councillor since 2003.)	Denise Atkinson MBE (Lab)
2006	Neil Taggart (Lab)	Ted Hanley (Lab)	Denise Atkinson MBE (Lab)
2007	Neil Taggart (Lab)	Ted Hanley (Lab)	Denise Atkinson MBE (Lab)
2008	Neil Taggart (Lab)	Ted Hanley (Lab)	Denise Atkinson MBE (Lab)
2010	Neil Taggart (Lab)	Ted Hanley (Lab)	Denise Atkinson MBE (Lab)
2011	Neil Taggart (Lab)	Ted Hanley (Lab)	Denise Atkinson MBE (Lab) (Note: Atkinson retired from the council at the 2012 election.)
2012	Neil Taggart (Lab) (Note: In October 2013, the Labour Party announced Taggart had not been re-selected as the party candidate for the 2014 council election. In July 2017, Taggart was convicted of offences relating to indecent images of children. A June 2017 report by The Yorkshire Post stated, "Labour did not comment why it chose to deselect the long-serving councillor but, it was reported at the time, it came after "a difficult time in his personal life." It was reported that he had been absent from many council meetings since the previous summer and had been fighting cancer.")	Ted Hanley (Lab)	Caroline Gruen (Lab)
2014	Kevin Ritchie (Lab)	Ted Hanley (Lab)	Caroline Gruen (Lab)
2015	Kevin Ritchie (Lab)	Julie Heselwood (Lab)	Caroline Gruen (Lab)
2016	Kevin Ritchie (Lab)	Julie Heselwood (Lab)	Caroline Gruen (Lab)
2018	Kevin Ritchie (Lab)	Julie Heselwood (Lab)	Caroline Gruen (Lab)
2019	Kevin Ritchie (Lab)	Julie Heselwood (Lab)	Caroline Gruen (Lab)
2021	Kevin Ritchie (Lab)	Julie Heselwood (Lab)	Caroline Gruen (Lab)
2022	Kevin Ritchie (Lab)	Julie Heselwood (Lab) (Note: Heselwood did not run for re-election in Bramley and Stanningley ward. She successfully stood in Weetwood instead.)	Caroline Gruen (Lab)
2023	Kevin Ritchie (Lab)	Tom Hinchcliffe (Lab)	Caroline Gruen (Lab)
2024	Kevin Ritchie (Lab)	Tom Hinchcliffe (Lab)	Adele Rae (Lab)
2026	Kevin Ritchie* (Lab)	Tom Hinchcliffe* (Lab)	Adele Rae* (Lab)

indicates seat up for re-election. indicates seat up for election following resignation or death of sitting councillor. * indicates incumbent councillor.

== Elections since 2010 ==
=== May 2026 ===
2026
Party	Candidate	Votes	%	±%
Labour	Kevin Ritchie*	2,724	43.8	▼17.0
Reform	Daren David Morrish	2,112	34.0	New
Green	Annabell Roodi Kesby	883	14.2	▲1.4
Conservative	William Michael Gallimore	308	5.0	▼9.4
Liberal Democrats	Rosemary Claire Spencer	166	2.7	▼8.4
SDP	Ian Robert Howell	20	0.3	▼1.6
Majority		612	9.8	▼36.6
Turnout		6,221	37.0	▲10.7
Rejected ballots		8	0.1	
Registered electors		16,813		
Labour hold		Swing	▼25.5	

=== May 2024 ===
2024
Party	Candidate	Votes	%	±%
Labour	Adele Rae	2,675	60.8	−1.4
Conservative	Adam Cook	632	14.4	−1.9
Green	Keith Whittaker	521	11.8	+2.8
Liberal Democrats	Liz Bee	487	11.1	−0.1
SDP	Richard Riley	82	1.9	+0.5
Majority		2,043	46.4	+0.5
Turnout		4,442	26.3	+1.2
Labour hold		Swing	+0.3	

=== May 2023 ===
2023
Party	Candidate	Votes	%	±%
Labour	Tom Hinchcliffe	2,662	62.2	−6.0
Conservative	Adam Cook	696	16.3	−1.0
Liberal Democrats	Elizabeth Bee	479	11.2	+4.1
Green	Keith Whittaker	384	9.0	+2.9
SDP	Richard Riley	62	1.4	+1.3
Majority		1,966	45.9	−5.0
Turnout		4,319	25.1	−2.5
Labour hold		Swing		

=== May 2022 ===
2022
Party	Candidate	Votes	%	±%
Labour	Kevin Ritchie*	3,230	68.2	+15.3
Conservative	Adam Cook	819	17.3	−8.2
Liberal Democrats	Elizabeth Bee	338	7.1	−3.8
Green	Keith Whittaker	290	6.1	−2.7
SDP	Daniel Whetstone	36	0.1	−0.7
Majority		2,411	50.9	+23.6
Turnout		4,734	27.6	−2.9
Labour hold		Swing		

=== May 2021 ===
2021
Party	Candidate	Votes	%	±%
Labour	Caroline Gruen*	2,779	52.9	+4.3
Conservative	Adam Cook	1,342	25.5	+15.1
Liberal Democrats	Liz Bee	571	10.9	+1.2
Green	Clive Lord	461	8.8	+0.0
SDP	Daniel Whetstone	40	0.8	N/A
Majority		1,437	27.3	−6.8
Turnout		5,255	30.5	+6.6
Labour hold		Swing		

=== May 2019 ===
2019
Party	Candidate	Votes	%	±%
Labour	Julie Heselwood*	1,942	48.6	−6.2
UKIP	David Woodhead	581	14.5	+14.5
Conservative	Alex Nancolas	417	10.4	−4.2
Liberal Democrats	Liz Bee	387	9.7	−0.3
Green	Clive Lord	351	8.8	−2.0
For Britain	Anne Murgatroyd	218	5.4	−3.8
English Democrat	Dean Locke	109	2.7	+2.7
Majority		1,361	34.1	−6.1
Turnout		4,033	23.9	−2.3
Labour hold		Swing	+10.4	

=== May 2018 ===
2018
Party	Candidate	Votes	%	±%
Labour	Kevin Ritchie*	2,905	54.8	+3.6
Labour	Caroline Gruen*	2,560		
Labour	Julie Heselwood*	2,529		
Conservative	Ovidiu Caprariu	772	14.6	+4.1
Conservative	Alexander Nancolas	710		
Conservative	Neil Hunt	692		
Green	Clive Lord	573	10.8	+1.0
Liberal Democrats	Elizabeth Bee	528	10.0	+6.3
For Britain	Anne Murgatroyd	489	9.2	N/A
Majority		2,133	40.2	+13.9
Turnout		16,923	26.2	−3.0
Labour hold		Swing		
Labour hold		Swing		
Labour hold		Swing		

=== May 2016 ===
2016
Party	Candidate	Votes	%	±%
Labour	Caroline Gruen*	2,370	51.2	+5.4
UKIP	Anne Murgatroyd	1,152	24.9	+2.3
Conservative	Alex Nancolas	484	10.5	+7.8
Green	Kate Bisson	453	9.8	−1.3
Liberal Democrats	Serena Samantha Glover	171	3.7	+0.5
Majority		1,218	26.3	+3.1
Turnout		4,630	29.2	
Labour hold		Swing		

=== May 2015 ===
2015
Party	Candidate	Votes	%	±%
Labour	Julie Heselwood	4,267	45.8	−15.0
UKIP	Anne Murgatroyd	2,103	22.6	+22.6
Conservative	Alexander Nancolas	1,708	18.3	−1.9
Green	Kate Bisson	791	8.5	−1.5
Liberal Democrats	Serena Glover	389	4.2	−4.8
TUSC	Kevin Pattison	60	0.6	+0.6
Majority		2,164	23.2	−17.3
Turnout		9,318	57.3	
Labour hold		Swing	-18.8	

=== May 2014 ===
2014
Party	Candidate	Votes	%	±%
Labour	Kevin Ritchie	2,092	43.9	
UKIP	Anne Murgatroyd	1,600	33.6	
Conservative	Alexander Nancolas	454	9.5	
Green	Kate Bisson	358	7.5	
Liberal Democrats	Serena Glover	219	4.6	
TUSC	Kevin Pattison	44	0.9	
Majority		492		
Turnout		4,767	29.98	
Labour hold		Swing		

=== May 2012 ===
2012
Party	Candidate	Votes	%	±%
Labour	Caroline Gruen	2,343	55.1	−5.7
UKIP	Anne Murgatroyd	655	15.4	+15.4
Conservative	Mohammed Rahman	323	7.6	−12.7
Liberal Democrats	Nathan Fossey	323	7.6	−1.4
English Democrat	Dean Loke	307	7.2	+7.2
Green	Kate Bisson	304	7.1	−2.9
Majority		1,688	39.7	−0.8
Turnout		4,255		
Labour hold		Swing	-10.5	

=== May 2011 ===
2011
Party	Candidate	Votes	%	±%
Labour	Ted Hanley*	3,121	60.8	+19.7
Conservative	Alistair McDowall	1,040	20.2	+1.1
Green	Kate Bisson	514	10.0	+6.8
Liberal Democrats	Nathan Fossey	462	9.0	−14.9
Majority		2,081	40.5	+23.4
Turnout		5,137	31	
Labour hold		Swing	+9.3	

=== May 2010 ===
2010
Party	Candidate	Votes	%	±%
Labour	Neil Taggart*	3,846	41.0	−1.2
Liberal Democrats	Elizabeth Bee	2,242	23.9	+12.6
Conservative	Philip Smith	1,790	19.1	−3.3
BNP	Sharon Knight	812	8.7	−4.5
UKIP	Jeff Miles	379	4.0	+4.0
Green	Kate Bisson	302	3.2	−2.0
Majority		1,604	17.1	−2.8
Turnout		9,371	56.8	+27.9
Labour hold		Swing	-6.9	
