= Calverley and Farsley (ward) =

Electoral ward in Leeds, England

- Calverley and Farsley highlighted within Leeds
- Population: 18,466 (2023 electorate)
- Metropolitan borough: City of Leeds
- Metropolitan county: West Yorkshire
- Region: Yorkshire and the Humber
- Country: England
- Sovereign state: United Kingdom
- UK Parliament: Leeds West and Pudsey
- Councillors: Amanda Carter (Conservative); Craig Timmins (Labour); Andrew Carter CBE (Conservative)

Calverley and Farsley is an electoral ward of Leeds City Council in west Leeds, West Yorkshire, including the village of Calverley and town of Farsley.

== Councillors ==
Election	Councillor	Councillor	Councillor
Pudsey North (1973 to 2004)
1973	Andrew Carter (Con)	J. Finnigan (Lib)	C. Thompson (Con)
1975	Andrew Carter (Con)	J. Finnigan (Lib)	C. Thompson (Con)
1976	Andrew Carter (Con)	James Bashall (Con)	C. Thompson (Con)
1978	Andrew Carter (Con)	James Bashall (Con)	C. Thompson (Con)
1979	Andrew Carter (Con)	James Bashall (Con)	Iris Favell (Con)
1980	Andrew Carter (Con)	James Bashall (Con)	Iris Favell (Con)
1982	Andrew Carter (Con)	James Bashall (Con)	Iris Favell (Con)
1983	Andrew Carter (Con)	James Bashall (Con)	Iris Favell (Con)
1984	Andrew Carter (Con)	James Bashall (Con)	Iris Favell (Con)
1986	Andrew Carter (Con)	James Bashall (Con)	Iris Favell (Con)
1987	Andrew Carter (Con)	James Bashall (Con)	Iris Favell (Con)
1988	Andrew Carter (Con)	James Bashall (Con)	Iris Favell (Con)
1990	Andrew Carter (Con)	Angus Ross (Lab)	Iris Favell (Con)
1991	Andrew Carter (Con)	Angus Ross (Lab)	Iris Favell (Con)
1992	Andrew Carter (Con)	Angus Ross (Lab) (Note: Ross stood down at the 1994 election. He later served as a councillor for Bramley ward from 1994 to 1998.)	Iris Favell (Con)
1994	Andrew Carter (Con)	Janet Harper (Lab)	Iris Favell (Con)
1995	Andrew Carter (Con)	Janet Harper (Lab)	Thomas Spamer (Lab)
1996	Andrew Carter (Con)	Janet Harper (Lab) (Note: Harper lost her seat in 1998 and was later elected as an Armley ward councillor from 1999 to 2014.)	Thomas Spamer (Lab)
1998	Andrew Carter (Con)	Frank Robinson (Con)	Thomas Spamer (Lab)
1999	Andrew Carter (Con)	Frank Robinson (Con)	Amanda Carter (Con)
2000	Andrew Carter (Con)	Frank Robinson (Con)	Amanda Carter (Con)
2002	Andrew Carter (Con)	Frank Robinson (Con)	Amanda Carter (Con)
2003	Andrew Carter (Con)	Frank Robinson (Con)	Amanda Carter (Con)
Calverley and Farsley (2004 to present)
2004	Andrew Carter (Con)	Frank Robinson (Con)	Amanda Carter (Con)
2006	Andrew Carter (Con)	Frank Robinson (Con)	Amanda Carter (Con)
2007	Andrew Carter (Con)	Frank Robinson (Con)	Amanda Carter (Con)
2008	Andrew Carter (Con)	Frank Robinson (Con)	Joe Marjoram (Con)
2010	Andrew Carter (Con)	Rod Wood (Con)	Joe Marjoram (Con)
2011	Andrew Carter (Con)	Rod Wood (Con)	Joe Marjoram (Con)
2012	Andrew Carter (Con)	Rod Wood (Con)	Joe Marjoram (Con)
July 2013	Andrew Carter (Con)	Rod Wood (Con)	Joe Marjoram (Ind) (Note: Marjoram resigned from the Conservative council group to sit as an independent. He had previously publicly criticised David Cameron and other prominent Conservative politicians on social media.)
2014	Andrew Carter (Con)	Rod Wood (Con)	Joe Marjoram (Ind)
2015	Andrew Carter CBE (Con)	Rod Wood (Con)	Amanda Carter (Con)
2016	Andrew Carter CBE (Con)	Rod Wood (Con)	Amanda Carter (Con)
2018	Andrew Carter CBE (Con)	Peter Carlill (Lab)	Amanda Carter (Con)
2019	Andrew Carter CBE (Con)	Peter Carlill (Lab)	Amanda Carter (Con)
2021	Andrew Carter CBE (Con)	Peter Carlill (Lab)	Amanda Carter (Con)
2022	Andrew Carter CBE (Con)	Peter Carlill (Lab)	Amanda Carter (Con)
2023	Andrew Carter CBE (Con)	Peter Carlill (Lab)	Amanda Carter (Con)
2024	Andrew Carter CBE (Con)	Peter Carlill (Lab)	Craig Timmins (Lab)
2026	Andrew Carter CBE (Con)	Peter Carlill (Lab)	Craig Timmins (Lab)
October 2026 by-election	Andrew Carter CBE* (Con)	Amanda Carter*(Con)	Craig Timmins* (Lab)

indicates seat up for re-election. indicates seat up for election following resignation or death of sitting councillor. indicates councillor defection. * indicates incumbent councillor.

== Elections since 2010 ==
=== October 2026 by-election ===
In September, Labour councillor Peter Carlill, whose most recent term began in 2023, resigned, citing "health reasons". The by-election took place on 22 October 2026, and seven candidates were nominated.

22 October 2026 by-election replacing Peter Carlill
Party	Candidate	Votes	%	±%
Conservative	Amanda Carter	2,330	40.2	+3.6
Labour	Kathryn Penny	2,134	36.8	+9.5
Reform	Craig Gabbitas	693	12.0	−4.7
Green	Daisy Gilpin	341	5.9	−10.4
Restore	Bradley Holmes	151	2.6	New
Liberal Democrats	Stuart McLeod	92	1.6	−1.4
Yorkshire	Bob Buxton	57	1.0	New
Majority		196	3.4	−5.9
Rejected ballots		6	0.1	-0.1
Turnout		5,804	32.2	−14.5
Registered electors				
Conservative gain from Labour		Swing	▼3.0	

=== May 2026 ===
2026
Party	Candidate	Votes	%	±%
Conservative	Andrew Carter	3,102	36.6	▼5.3
Labour Co-op	Kathryn Sara Penny	2,313	27.3	▼19.0
Reform	Andy North	1,418	16.7	New
Green	Ellen Graham	1,380	16.3	▲7.6
Liberal Democrats	Stuart McLeod	258	3.0	▼0.1
Majority		789	9.3	▲4.9
Turnout		8,490	46.7	▲4.8
Rejected ballots		19	0.2	
Registered electors		18,198		
Conservative hold		Swing	▲6.9	

=== May 2024 ===
2024
Party	Candidate	Votes	%	±%
Labour Co-op	Craig Timmins	3,514	46.3	−8.3
Conservative	Amanda Carter*	3,182	41.9	+6.6
Green	Ellen Graham	663	8.7	+5.2
Liberal Democrats	Stuart McLeod	234	3.1	+0.2
Majority		332	4.4	−14.9
Turnout		7,642	41.9	+3.0
Labour gain from Conservative		Swing	-7.5	

=== May 2023 ===
2023
Party	Candidate	Votes	%	±%
Labour Co-op	Peter Carlill*	3,926	54.6	+11.8
Conservative	Jas Singh	2,536	35.3	−11.4
Green	Ellen Graham	251	3.5	−0.7
Yorkshire	Robert Lees	250	3.5	+0.5
Liberal Democrats	Stuart McLeod	205	2.9	−0.1
Majority		1,390	19.3	+15.4
Turnout		7,186	38.9	−2.4
Labour hold		Swing		

=== May 2022 ===
2022
Party	Candidate	Votes	%	±%
Conservative	Andrew Carter*	3,539	46.7	−6.9
Labour	Craig Timmins	3,243	42.8	+8.8
Green	Ellen Graham	318	4.2	−3.8
Liberal Democrats	Ian Dowling	228	3.0	−0.7
Yorkshire	Robert Lees	225	3.0	N/A
SDP	Justin Thomas	14	0.0	N/A
Majority		296	3.9	−15.7
Turnout		7,584	41.3	−3.1
Conservative hold		Swing		

=== May 2021 ===
2021
Party	Candidate	Votes	%	±%
Conservative	Amanda Carter*	4,424	53.6	+10.5
Labour	Naheem Alam	2,808	34.0	−9.5
Green	Ellen Graham	664	8.0	−1.7
Liberal Democrats	Ian Dowling	312	3.7	+0.1
Majority		1,616	19.6	+19.2
Turnout		8,254	44.4	+7.5
Conservative hold		Swing		

=== May 2019 ===
2019
Party	Candidate	Votes	%	±%
Labour	Peter Carlill*	2,891	43.5	+5.8
Conservative	Jas Singh	2,864	43.1	−5.5
Green	Ellen Graham	643	9.7	+0.7
Liberal Democrats	Kate Arbuckle	242	3.6	−1.1
Majority		27	0.4	−10.5
Turnout		6,695	36.9	−3.7
Labour hold		Swing	+5.7	

=== May 2018 ===
2018
Party	Candidate	Votes	%	±%
Conservative	Andrew Carter*	3,972	48.6	−4.3
Conservative	Amanda Carter*	3,716		
Labour	Peter Carlill	3,086	37.7	+5.0
Conservative	Roderic Wood*	3,039		
Labour	Nicole Sharpe	2,597		
Labour	Naheem Alam	2,483		
Green	Ellen Graham	733	9.0	+6.7
Liberal Democrats	Kate Arbuckle	387	4.7	+1.1
Liberal Democrats	Robert Jacques	220		
Liberal Democrats	Benedict Chastney	190		
Majority		886	10.9	−9.3
Turnout		18,194	40.6	+1.0
Conservative hold		Swing		
Conservative hold		Swing		
Labour gain from Conservative		Swing		

=== May 2016 ===
2016
Party	Candidate	Votes	%	±%
Conservative	Andrew Carter*	3,674	52.9	+5.9
Labour	Peter Carlill	2,269	32.7	+3.7
UKIP	Malcolm Steele	596	8.6	−0.2
Liberal Democrats	Kate Arbuckle	249	3.6	+0.2
Green	Clive Lord	161	2.3	+2.1
Majority		1,405	20.2	+9.6
Turnout		6,949	39.6	
Conservative hold		Swing		

=== May 2015 ===
2015
Party	Candidate	Votes	%	±%
Conservative	Amanda Carter*	6,005	47.0	−1.1
Labour	John James Bracken	4,651	36.4	−6.2
UKIP	Joe Murgatroyd	1,119	8.8	+8.8
Green	Clive Lord	560	4.4	+4.4
Liberal Democrats	Kate Arbuckle	431	3.4	−5.8
Majority		1,354	10.6	+5.1
Turnout		12,766	71.2	
Conservative hold		Swing	+2.6	

=== May 2014 ===
2014
Party	Candidate	Votes	%	±%
Conservative	Roderic Wood*	2,670	38.2	
Labour	John Bracken	2,476	35.4	
UKIP	Joseph Murgatroyd	1,242	17.8	
Green	Clive Lord	349	5.0	
Liberal Democrats	Kate Arbuckle	256	3.7	
Majority		194		
Turnout		6,993	39.75	
Conservative hold		Swing		

=== May 2012 ===
2012
Party	Candidate	Votes	%	±%
Conservative	Andrew Carter*	3,436	52.7	+4.5
Labour	Rachel Seabright	2,142	32.8	−9.8
UKIP	Alistair McDowall	433	6.6	+6.6
Green	Clive Lord	297	4.6	+4.6
Liberal Democrats	Kate Arbuckle	218	3.3	−5.9
Majority		1,294	19.8	+14.3
Turnout		6,526		
Conservative hold		Swing	+7.1	

=== May 2011 ===
2011
Party	Candidate	Votes	%	±%
Conservative	Joseph Marjoram*	3,568	48.1	+8.4
Labour	Carol Hughes	3,158	42.6	+8.0
Liberal Democrats	Jude Arbuckle	685	9.2	−10.0
Majority		410	5.5	+0.3
Turnout		7,411	42	
Conservative hold		Swing	+0.2	

=== May 2010 ===
2010
Party	Candidate	Votes	%	±%
Conservative	Roderic Wood	4,964	39.8	−20.4
Labour	Andrew Jarosz	4,318	34.6	+16.0
Liberal Democrats	Kate Arbuckle	2,403	19.3	+7.5
BNP	Robert Leary	790	6.3	−3.0
Majority		646	5.2	−36.4
Turnout		12,475	71.2	+34.2
Conservative hold		Swing	-18.2	

== See also ==
- Listed buildings in Calverley and Farsley
