= 2014 Leeds City Council election =

- 22 May 2014

33 of the 99 seats on Leeds City Council 50 seats needed for a majority
	First party	Second party	Third party
Leader	Keith Wakefield	Andrew Carter	Stewart Golton
Party	Labour	Conservative	Liberal Democrats
Last election	21 seats, 46.0%	6 seats, 22.0%	3 seats, 13.0%
Seats won	20	6	4
Seats after	63	18	9
Seat change	Steady	Steady	▼1
Popular vote	71,602	39,953	18,867
Percentage	38.6%	21.5%	10.2%
	Fourth party	Fifth party	Sixth party
Party	Morley Borough Independents	Green	UKIP
Last election	2 seats, 3.9%	1 seats, 5.4%	0 seats, 4.6%
Seats won	2	1	0
Seats after	5	3	0
Seat change	Steady	▲1	Steady
Popular vote	4,726	16,868	31,077
Percentage	2.5%	9.1%	16.7%
- Labour in red (20), Conservatives in blue (6), Liberal Democrats in yellow (4), Morley Borough Independents in dark green (2) and Greens in light green (1).
Council control before election
Majority administration
Labour
Council control after election
Majority administration
Labour

The 2014 Leeds City Council election took place on Thursday 22 May 2014 to elect members of Leeds City Council in England. It was held on the same day as the 2014 European Parliament election and other local elections across the UK.

As per the election cycle, one third of the council's seats were up for election. The councillors subsequently elected replaced those elected when their individual seats were previously contested in 2010.

The Labour Party had been in overall control of the council since 2011 and their majority was unchanged following this election after winning 20 of the 33 seats contested.

== Election summary ==
Leeds City Council Election Result 2014
Party	Seats	Gains	Losses	Net gain/loss	Seats %	Votes %	Votes	+/−
Labour	20	1	1	Steady	60.6	38.6	71,602	
Conservative	6	0	0	Steady	18.2	21.5	39,953	
UKIP	0	0	0	Steady	0.0	16.7	31,077	
Liberal Democrats	4	0	1	▼1	12.1	10.2	18,867	
Green	1	1	0	▲1	3.0	9.1	16,868	
Morley Borough Independent	2	0	0	Steady	6.1	2.5	4,726	
Alliance for Green Socialism	0	0	0	Steady	0.0	0.6	1,125	
Independent	0	0	0	Steady	0.0	0.3	537	
TUSC	0	0	0	Steady	0.0	0.3	527	
British Democrats	0	0	0	Steady	0.0	0.2	358	

This result had the following consequences for the total number of seats on the council after the elections:

Party	2012 election	Prior to election	New council
Labour	63	63	63
Conservative	19	18 (Note: Calverley and Farsley councillor Joe Marjoram resigned from the Conservative council group to sit as an independent. He had previously publicly criticised David Cameron and other prominent Conservative politicians on social media.)	18
Liberal Democrat	10	10	9
Morley Borough Independent	5	5	5
Green	2	2	3
Independent	0	1 (Note: Joe Marjoram (Calverley and Farsley) resigned from the Conservatives in July 2013.)	1
Total	99	99	99
Working majority	27	27	27

== Councillors who did not stand for re-election ==
Councillor/s who did not stand for re-election (6)
Councillor	Ward	First elected	Party	Reason	Successor
Bernard Atha CBE	Kirkstall	1957, 1969	Labour	stood down	Fiona Venner (Labour)
Clive Fox	Adel & Wharfedale	2000	Conservative	died in office (Note: Fox died on 8 April 2014 and no by-election was called.)	Billy Flynn (Conservative)
Martin Hamilton	Headingley	2002	Liberal Democrats	stood down	Jonathan Pryor (Labour)
Janet Harper	Armley	1999	Labour	stood down	Alice Smart (Labour)
Thomas Murray	Garforth & Swillington	1992	Labour	stood down	Stuart McKenna (Labour)
Neil Taggart	Bramley & Stanningley	1980	Labour	stood down	Kevin Ritchie (Labour)

== Ward results ==
Adel & Wharfedale
Party	Candidate	Votes	%	±%
Conservative	Billy Flynn	3,018	44.5	−1.0
Labour	Mark Henley	1,312	19.3	+3.5
Liberal Democrats	Cheryl Kebede	1,154	17.0	−20.7
UKIP	Mal Steele	966	14.2	+13.5
Green	Paul Marchant	336	5.0	+2.3
Majority		1,706		
Turnout		6,786	43.75	
Conservative hold		Swing		

Alwoodley
Party	Candidate	Votes	%	±%
Conservative	Peter Harrand*	3,227	48.2	−1.2
Labour	Keith White	1,910	28.5	+1.3
UKIP	Warren Hendon	891	13.3	+10.6
Liberal Democrats	Sue Knights	309	4.6	−12.9
Green	Miriam Moss	290	4.3	+4.3
Alliance for Green Socialism	Brian Jackson	67	1.0	−0.2
Majority		1,317		
Turnout		6,694	38.3	
Conservative hold		Swing		

Ardsley & Robin Hood
Party	Candidate	Votes	%	±%
Labour	Lisa Mulherin*	1,865	36.0	
UKIP	David Daniel	1,593	30.7	
Conservative	Tim Atkin	929	17.9	
Independent	Wyn Kidger	482	9.3	
Green	Carl James	176	3.4	
Liberal Democrats	Benjamin Ward	139	2.7	
Majority		272		
Turnout		5,184	30.18	
Labour hold		Swing		

Armley
Party	Candidate	Votes	%	±%
Labour	Alice Smart	2,269	43.8	
UKIP	John Withill	1,548	29.9	
Green	Yvonne Clarke	669	12.9	
Conservative	Mohammed Rahman	392	7.6	
Liberal Democrats	Christine Glover	236	4.6	
TUSC	Iain Dalton	65	1.3	
Majority		721		
Turnout		5,179	30.54	
Labour hold		Swing		

Beeston & Holbeck
Party	Candidate	Votes	%	±%
Labour	David Congreve*	2,063	48.4	
UKIP	Tony Roberts	1,288	30.2	
Conservative	Robert Winfield	499	11.7	
Green	David Smith	284	6.7	
Liberal Democrats	Victoria Bishop-Rowe	130	3.0	
Majority		775		
Turnout		4,264	28.72	
Labour hold		Swing		

Bramley & Stanningley
Party	Candidate	Votes	%	±%
Labour	Kevin Ritchie	2,092	43.9	
UKIP	Anne Murgatroyd	1,600	33.6	
Conservative	Alexander Nancolas	454	9.5	
Green	Kate Bisson	358	7.5	
Liberal Democrats	Serena Glover	219	4.6	
TUSC	Kevin Pattison	44	0.9	
Majority		492		
Turnout		4,767	29.98	
Labour hold		Swing		

Burmantofts & Richmond Hill
Party	Candidate	Votes	%	±%
Labour	Ron Grahame*	1,864	43.0	
UKIP	Geoff Holloran	1,150	26.6	
Liberal Democrats	David Hollingsworth	843	19.5	
Green	Pete Exley	318	7.3	
Conservative	Hayley Laura	156	3.6	
Majority		714		
Turnout		4,331	28.5	
Labour hold		Swing		

Calverley & Farsley
Party	Candidate	Votes	%	±%
Conservative	Rod Wood*	2,670	38.2	
Labour	John Bracken	2,476	35.4	
UKIP	Joseph Murgatroyd	1,242	17.8	
Green	Clive Lord	349	5.0	
Liberal Democrats	Kate Arbuckle	256	3.7	
Majority		194		
Turnout		6,993	39.75	
Conservative hold		Swing		

Chapel Allerton
Party	Candidate	Votes	%	±%
Labour	Jane Dowson*	3,683	61.3	
Conservative	Farzana Arif	746	12.4	
Green	Emma Carter	736	12.3	
Alliance for Green Socialism	Mike Davies	515	8.6	
Liberal Democrats	Aqila Choudhry	326	5.4	
Majority		2,937		
Turnout		6,006	34.59	
Labour hold		Swing		

City & Hunslet
Party	Candidate	Votes	%	±%
Labour	Mohammed Iqbal*	2,434	49.2	
UKIP	Nigel Buckland	785	15.9	
Green	Glen Jankowski	659	13.3	
Conservative	Richard Salt	631	12.7	
Liberal Democrats	Jahangir Aziz	354	7.2	
TUSC	Mary Finch	87	1.8	
Majority		1,649		
Turnout		4,950	22.84	
Labour hold		Swing		

Cross Gates & Whinmoor
Party	Candidate	Votes	%	±%
Labour	Peter Gruen*	2,555	44.6	
UKIP	Darren Oddy	1,808	31.6	
Conservative	Elizabeth Hayes	907	15.8	
Green	Ben Goldthorp	319	5.6	
Liberal Democrats	Richard Morris	136	2.4	
Majority		747		
Turnout		5725	33.11	
Labour hold		Swing		

Farnley & Wortley
Party	Candidate	Votes	%	±%
Green	Terry Wilford	1,900	34.3	
UKIP	Alan Felber	1,606	29.0	
Labour	John Hardy	1,506	27.2	
Conservative	Samuel Fisher	416	7.5	
Liberal Democrats	Robert Jacques	76	1.4	
TUSC	Michael Johnson	30	0.5	
Majority		294		
Turnout		5534	31.52	
Green gain from Labour		Swing		

Garforth & Swillington
Party	Candidate	Votes	%	±%
Labour	Stuart McKenna	3,172	51.7	
Conservative	Ryan Stephenson	2,027	33.0	
Green	Yvonne Murray	709	11.6	
Liberal Democrats	Mitch Gladas	227	3.7	
Majority		1,145		
Turnout		6,135	38.5	
Labour hold		Swing		

Gipton & Harehills
Party	Candidate	Votes	%	±%
Labour	Kamila Maqsood*	3,756	76.1	
Liberal Democrats	Adam Douglas	403	8.2	
Conservative	Beatrice Greenwood	393	8.0	
Green	Neil Seepujak	381	7.7	
Majority		3,353		
Turnout		4933	31.55	
Labour hold		Swing		

Guiseley & Rawdon
Party	Candidate	Votes	%	±%
Conservative	Pat Latty*	2,811	39.8	
Labour	David Bowe	1,871	26.5	
UKIP	Roger Tattersall	1,444	20.5	
Green	Colin Avison	541	7.7	
Liberal Democrats	Cindy Cleasby	389	5.5	
Majority		940		
Turnout		7056	38.65	
Conservative hold		Swing		

Harewood
Party	Candidate	Votes	%	±%
Conservative	Matthew Robinson*	3,542	59.5	
UKIP	Peter Morgan	1,176	19.8	
Labour	David Joyce	928	15.6	
Liberal Democrats	Christine Golton	249	4.2	
Green	Paul Matthews	58	1.0	
Majority		2,366	5953	
Turnout			42.0	
Conservative hold		Swing		

Headingley
Party	Candidate	Votes	%	±%
Labour	Jonathan Pryor	1,296		
Green	Joe Salmon	1,036		
Liberal Democrats	Ghaffar Karim	747		
Conservative	Diane Fox	228		
UKIP	Alistair McDowall	146		
Majority		260		
Turnout			30.12	
Labour gain from Liberal Democrats		Swing		

Horsforth
Party	Candidate	Votes	%	±%
Liberal Democrats	Brian Cleasby*	2,037		
Conservative	Richard O’Callaghan	1,880		
Labour	Rob Wilkinson	1,644		
UKIP	Paul Hellyer	1,059		
Green	Timothy Goodall	446		
TUSC	Benjamin Dixon	56		
Majority		157		
Turnout			40.88	
Liberal Democrats hold		Swing		

Hyde Park & Woodhouse
Party	Candidate	Votes	%	±%
Labour	Javaid Akhtar*	2,099		
Green	Chris Foren	865		
Conservative	Edward Hardy	295		
UKIP	Glenn Morley	288		
Liberal Democrats	Peter Andrews	207		
TUSC	Tanis Belsham-Wray	98		
Majority		1,234		
Turnout			24.89	
Labour hold		Swing		

Killingbeck & Seacroft
Party	Candidate	Votes	%	±%
Labour	Brian Selby*	2,927		
Conservative	Dorothy Flynn	623		
Green	Louise Richardson	617		
Liberal Democrats	Joanne Binns	311		
Majority		2,304		
Turnout			29.2	
Labour hold		Swing		

Kippax & Methley
Party	Candidate	Votes	%	±%
Labour	Keith Wakefield*	2,868		
UKIP	Tina Smith	1,599		
Conservative	James Langley	867		
Green	David Webb	237		
Liberal Democrats	John Hills	141		
Majority		1,269		
Turnout			35.63	
Labour hold		Swing		

Kirkstall
Party	Candidate	Votes	%	±%
Labour	Fiona Venner	2,696		
UKIP	Kevin Reid	907		
Green	Morgan Tatchell-Evans	724		
Conservative	Matthew Wharton	379		
Liberal Democrats	Martin Hughes	252		
TUSC	Ben Mayor	56		
Independent	Stuart Long	55		
Majority				
Turnout			33.77	
Labour hold		Swing		

Middleton Park
Party	Candidate	Votes	%	±%
Labour	Kim Groves*	2,489		
UKIP	Craig Sweaton	1,756		
British Democrats	Kevin Meeson	358		
Conservative	Barbara Harpham	287		
Green	Austen Thompson	219		
Liberal Democrats	Sadie Fisher	79		
Majority				
Turnout			28.04	
Labour hold		Swing		

Moortown
Party	Candidate	Votes	%	±%
Labour	Sharon Hamilton*	2,923		
Conservative	Mark Dodsworth	1,282		
UKIP	Alan Procter	821		
Green	Christopher Smith	806		
Liberal Democrats	Darren Finlay	781		
Alliance for Green Socialism	Ros Campbell	188		
Majority				
Turnout			39.87	
Labour hold		Swing		

Morley North
Party	Candidate	Votes	%	±%
Morley Borough Independent	Thomas Leadley*	2,759		
Labour	Charlotte Hill	1,181		
UKIP	Luke Senior	1,150		
Conservative	Sophie Tempest	675		
Green	Deborah Fenney	180		
Liberal Democrats	John MacArthur	74		
Majority		1,578		
Turnout		6,019	34.56	
Morley Borough Independent hold		Swing		

Morley South
Party	Candidate	Votes	%	±%
Morley Borough Independent	Shirley Varley*	1,967		
Labour	Mark Sewards	1,293		
UKIP	Lindon Dove	1,279		
Conservative	Kathleen Tempest	489		
Green	Bluebell Eikonoklastes	116		
Liberal Democrats	Kathryn Gagen	71		
TUSC	Neil Cussons	51		
Majority		674		
Turnout		5,266	31.93	
Morley Borough Independent hold		Swing		

Otley & Yeadon
Party	Candidate	Votes	%	±%
Liberal Democrats	Ryk Downes*	2,916		
Labour	Carl Morris	1,916		
UKIP	Tom Hollings	1,306		
Conservative	Gerard Francis	921		
Green	Owen Brear	490		
Majority				
Turnout			43.65	
Liberal Democrats hold		Swing		

Pudsey
Party	Candidate	Votes	%	±%
Labour	Mick Coulson*	2,182		
UKIP	Phil Banks	1,785		
Conservative	Amanda Carter	1,356		
Green	Irene Dracup	390		
Liberal Democrats	Jude Arbuckle	205		
Majority				
Turnout			35.4	
Labour hold		Swing		

Rothwell
Party	Candidate	Votes	%	±%
Liberal Democrats	Stewart Golton*	2,429		
Labour	Angela Kellett	2,018		
Conservative	Stephen Ellis	723		
Green	Gordon Haycock	385		
Majority		411		
Turnout			36.04	
Liberal Democrats hold		Swing		

Roundhay
Party	Candidate	Votes	%	±%
Labour	Ghulam Hussain*	3,229		
Conservative	Andy Paraskos	1,952		
Liberal Democrats	Richard Whelan	528		
Green	Paul Ellis	820		
Alliance for Green Socialism	Malcolm Christie	355		
Majority		1,277		
Turnout			40.96	
Labour hold		Swing		

Temple Newsam
Party	Candidate	Votes	%	±%
Labour	Mick Lyons*	2,294		
UKIP	Bruce Naylor	1,599		
Conservative	David Schofield	1,377		
Green	Nathan Allen	335		
Liberal Democrats	Keith Norman	148		
Majority		695		
Turnout			35.38	
Labour hold		Swing		

Weetwood
Party	Candidate	Votes	%	±%
Liberal Democrats	Judith Chapman*	2,155		
Labour	Julie Heselwood	1,768		
Conservative	Thomas McMeeking	806		
UKIP	Mike Cullen	737		
Green	Martin Hemingway	646		
TUSC	Max Cussons	40		
Majority		387		
Turnout			39.57	
Liberal Democrats hold		Swing		

Wetherby
Party	Candidate	Votes	%	±%
Conservative	John Procter*	2,995		
UKIP	Paul Spivey	1,096		
Labour	Paul Drinkwater	1,023		
Green	Sam Murray	508		
Liberal Democrats	Sara Howell	340		
Majority				
Turnout			38.38	
Conservative hold		Swing		
