= Alwoodley (ward) =

Electoral ward in Leeds, England

- Alwoodley highlighted within Leeds
- Population: 17,522 (2023 electorate)
- Metropolitan borough: City of Leeds
- Metropolitan county: West Yorkshire
- Region: Yorkshire and the Humber
- Country: England
- Sovereign state: United Kingdom
- UK Parliament: Leeds North East
- Councillors: Lyn Buckley (Conservative); Neil Buckley (Conservative); Dan Cohen (Conservative)

Alwoodley is an electoral ward of Leeds City Council in the north of Leeds, West Yorkshire, covering the urban suburb areas of Alwoodley, the majority of Moor Allerton (above the Leeds Outer Ring Road) and Slaid Hill.

== Boundaries ==
The Alwoodley ward includes Slaid Hill and Wigton, the south western and most populous parts of the civil parish of Harewood. Its predecessor, the North ward, also contained the actual village of Harewood and surrounding villages in the parish, including Wike. They currently sit in the neighbouring Harewood ward.

== Councillors since 1980 ==
Election	Councillor	Councillor	Councillor
North (1980 to 2004)
1980	A.D. Redmond (Con) (Note: Redmond had previously represented Moortown ward since 1968.)	Ronald Feldman (Con) (Note: Feldman had served as a councillor for Talbot ward from 1971.)	K. Sibbald (Con) (Note: Sibbald had previously represented Moortown ward since 1976.)
1982	A.D. Redmond (Con)	Ronald Feldman (Con)	K. Sibbald (Con)
1982 by-election	Geoffrey Shaffner (SDP)	Ronald Feldman (Con)	K. Sibbald (Con)
1983	Geoffrey Shaffner (SDP)	Ronald Feldman (Con)	K. Sibbald (Con)
1984	A. O'Brien (Con)	Ronald Feldman (Con)	K. Sibbald (Con)
1986	A. O'Brien (Con)	Ronald Feldman (Con)	K. Sibbald (Con)
1987	A. O'Brien (Con)	Ronald Feldman (Con)	K. Sibbald (Con)
1988	S. Morris (Con)	Ronald Feldman (Con)	K. Sibbald (Con)
1990	Peter Harrand (Con)	Ronald Feldman (Con)	Richard Manning (Con)
1991	Peter Harrand (Con)	Ronald Feldman (Con)	Richard Manning (Con)
1992	Peter Harrand (Con)	Ronald Feldman (Con)	Richard Manning (Con)
1994	Peter Harrand (Con)	Ronald Feldman (Con)	Richard Manning (Con)
1995	Peter Harrand (Con) (Note: Harrand lost his seat at the next election in 1996. He later represented Roundhay ward from 1998 until he was elected to represent the new Alwoodley ward in 2004.)	John Sully (Lab) (Note: Sully represented Burley ward between 1971 and 1973. He was later elected for Halton in 1990 and served until 1994. Sully then stood unsuccessfully for North ward in 1994 but was successful in 1995.)	Richard Manning (Con)
1996	Jonathan Brown (LD)	John Sully (Lab)	Richard Manning (Con)
1998	Jonathan Brown (LD)	John Sully (Lab)	Ronald Feldman (Con)
1999	Jonathan Brown (LD)	Ruth Feldman (Con)	Ronald Feldman (Con)
2000	Jonathan Brown (LD)	Ruth Feldman (Con)	Ronald Feldman (Con)
2002	Jonathan Brown (LD)	Ruth Feldman (Con)	Ronald Feldman (Con)
2003	Jonathan Brown (LD)	Ruth Feldman (Con)	Ronald Feldman (Con)
Alwoodley (2004 to present)
2004	Peter Harrand (Con)	Ruth Feldman (Con)	Ronald Feldman (Con)
2006	Peter Harrand (Con)	Ruth Feldman (Con)	Ronald Feldman (Con)
2007	Peter Harrand (Con)	Ruth Feldman (Con)	Ronald Feldman (Con)
2008	Peter Harrand (Con)	Ruth Feldman (Con)	Ronald Feldman (Con)
2010	Peter Harrand (Con)	Ruth Feldman (Con)	Ronald Feldman (Con)
2011	Peter Harrand (Con)	Dan Cohen (Con)	Ronald Feldman (Con)
2012	Peter Harrand (Con)	Dan Cohen (Con)	Neil Buckley (Con)
2014	Peter Harrand (Con)	Dan Cohen (Con)	Neil Buckley (Con)
2015	Peter Harrand (Con)	Dan Cohen (Con)	Neil Buckley (Con)
2016	Peter Harrand (Con)	Dan Cohen (Con)	Neil Buckley (Con)
2018	Peter Harrand (Con)	Dan Cohen (Con)	Neil Buckley (Con)
2019	Peter Harrand (Con)	Dan Cohen (Con)	Neil Buckley (Con)
2021	Peter Harrand (Con)	Dan Cohen (Con)	Neil Buckley (Con)
2022	Peter Harrand (Con)	Dan Cohen (Con)	Neil Buckley (Con)
2023	Lyn Buckley (Con)	Dan Cohen (Con)	Neil Buckley (Con)
2024	Lyn Buckley (Con)	Dan Cohen (Con)	Neil Buckley (Con)
2026	Lyn Buckley* (Con)	Dan Cohen* (Con)	Neil Buckley* (Con)

indicates seat up for re-election. indicates seat up for election following resignation or death of sitting councillor. * indicates incumbent councillor.

== Elections since 2010 ==
=== May 2026 ===
2026
Party	Candidate	Votes	%	±%
Conservative	Dan Cohen*	4,633	57.3	▲8.4
Green	Catherine Taylor	1,133	14.0	▲6.5
Labour Co-op	Matthen McGonagle	1,124	13.9	▼20.2
Reform	Howard Anthony Newman	893	11.1	New
Liberal Democrats	Robert Hugh Jacques	296	3.7	▼3.2
Majority		3,500	34.3	▲19.5
Turnout		8,096	47.8	▲7.4
Rejected ballots		17	0.2	
Registered electors		16,953		
Conservative hold		Swing	▲14.3	

=== May 2024 ===
2024
Party	Candidate	Votes	%	±%
Conservative	Neil Buckley*	3,390	48.9	−0.9
Labour	Jackie Ellis	2,368	34.1	−1.9
Green	Louise Jennings	520	7.5	+2.3
Liberal Democrats	Howard Foreman	481	6.9	+0.6
Yorkshire	Rio Goldhammer	176	2.5	±0.0
Majority		1,022	14.8	+1.0
Turnout		6,971	40.4	+3.1
Conservative hold		Swing	+0.5	

=== May 2023 ===
2023
Party	Candidate	Votes	%	±%
Conservative	Lyn Buckley	3,253	49.8	−10.5
Labour	Jackie Ellis	2,350	36.0	+7.7
Liberal Democrats	Jared Levy	419	6.3	+2.5
Green	Louise Jennings	340	5.2	+1.4
Yorkshire	Howard Dews	164	2.5	+0.7
Majority		903	13.8	−18.2
Turnout		6,541	37.3	−4.9
Conservative hold		Swing		

=== May 2022 ===
2022
Party	Candidate	Votes	%	±%
Conservative	Dan Cohen*	4,466	60.3	+2.8
Labour	Lucy Nuttgens	2,099	28.3	−2.1
Green	Alaric Hall	283	3.8	N/A
Liberal Democrats	Roderic Parker	278	3.8	−0.4
Yorkshire	Howard Dews	137	1.8	−1.3
Women's Equality	Louise Jennings	120	1.6	−0.6
Majority		2,367	32.0	+4.9
Turnout		7,408	42.2	−2.1
Conservative hold		Swing		

=== May 2021 ===
2021
Party	Candidate	Votes	%	±%
Conservative	Neil Buckley*	4,481	57.5	+2.7
Labour	Amy Hegan	2,370	30.4	+3.7
Liberal Democrats	Roderic Parker	328	4.2	−5.0
Yorkshire	Graham Dews	245	3.1	N/A
Women's Equality	Louise Jennings	174	2.2	−0.8
Alliance for Green Socialism	Brian Jackson	152	2.0	+1.0
Majority		2,111	27.1	−1.0
Turnout		7,794	44.3	+8.3
Conservative hold		Swing		

=== May 2019 ===
2019
Party	Candidate	Votes	%	±%
Conservative	Peter Harrand*	3,417	54.8	+2.2
Labour	Andrea McKenna	1,663	26.7	−2.9
Liberal Democrats	Alan Taylor	577	9.2	+1.4
Green	Gideon Jones	335	5.4	−2.5
Women's Equality	Louise Jennings	186	3.0	+3.0
Alliance for Green Socialism	Brian Jackson	60	1.0	−1.4
Majority		1,754	+28.1	+6.5
Turnout		6,290	36	−5.5
Conservative hold		Swing	+5.1	

=== May 2018 ===
2018
Party	Candidate	Votes	%	±%
Conservative	Dan Cohen*	4,209	52.2	+0.1
Conservative	Neil Buckley*	4,111		
Conservative	Peter Harrand*	3,896		
Labour	Keith White	2,389	29.6	−0.4
Labour	Claude Hendrickson	2,141		
Labour	Mumtaz Khan	2,019		
Green	Miriam Moss	639	7.9	+4.5
Liberal Democrats	Roderic Parker	633	7.8	+5.5
Alliance for Green Socialism	Brian Jackson	194	2.4	+1.1
Majority		1,722	21.6	−0.5
Turnout		17,605	41.5	+3.4
Conservative hold		Swing		
Conservative hold		Swing		
Conservative hold		Swing		

=== May 2016 ===
2016
Party	Candidate	Votes	%	±%
Conservative	Neil Buckley*	3,443	52.1	+0.7
Labour	Keith White	1,982	30.0	−1.0
UKIP	Warren Hendon	534	8.1	+0.6
Liberal Democrats	Roderic Parker	348	5.3	−0.2
Green	Miriam Leontine Moss	223	3.4	+0.3
Alliance for Green Socialism	Brian Jackson	83	1.3	+0.5
Majority		1,461	22.1	+1.7
Turnout		6,613	38.1	
Conservative hold		Swing		

=== May 2015 ===
2015
Party	Candidate	Votes	%	±%
Conservative	Dan Cohen*	6,472	51.4	−1.9
Labour	Keith White	3,907	31.0	−4.4
UKIP	Carl McGuire	943	7.5	+0.6
Liberal Democrats	Simon Dowling	698	5.5	+5.5
Green	Miriam Moss	471	3.7	+3.7
Alliance for Green Socialism	Brian Jackson	97	0.8	−3.6
Majority		2,565	20.4	+2.5
Turnout		12,588	70.3	
Conservative hold		Swing	+1.2	

=== May 2014 ===
2014
Party	Candidate	Votes	%	±%
Conservative	Peter Harrand*	3,227	48.2	−1.2
Labour	Keith White	1,910	28.5	+1.3
UKIP	Warren Hendon	891	13.3	+10.6
Liberal Democrats	Sue Knights	309	4.6	−12.9
Green	Miriam Moss	290	4.3	+4.3
Alliance for Green Socialism	Brian Jackson	67	1.0	−0.2
Majority		1,317		
Turnout		6,694	38.3	
Conservative hold		Swing		

=== May 2012 ===
2012
Party	Candidate	Votes	%	±%
Conservative	Neil Buckley	3,079	48.3	−5.0
Labour	Alison Garthwaite	2,121	33.3	−2.2
UKIP	Warren Hendon	558	8.8	+1.9
Liberal Democrats	Richard Whelan	401	6.3	+6.3
Alliance for Green Socialism	Brian Jackson	217	3.4	−1.0
Majority		958	15.0	−2.9
Turnout		6,376		
Conservative hold		Swing	-1.4	

=== May 2011 ===
2011
Party	Candidate	Votes	%	±%
Conservative	Dan Cohen	4,254	53.3	+3.9
Labour	Katy Sian	2,837	35.4	+8.2
UKIP	Warren Hendon	547	6.9	+4.1
Alliance for Green Socialism	Brian Jackson	351	4.4	+3.2
Majority		1,417	17.9	−4.3
Turnout		7,979	45	
Conservative hold		Swing	-2.1	

=== May 2010 ===
2010
Party	Candidate	Votes	%	±%
Conservative	Peter Harrand*	6,225	49.4	−7.4
Labour	Rosie Pickard	3,426	27.2	+7.7
Liberal Democrats	Sue Knights	2,207	17.5	+2.9
UKIP	Warren Hendon	343	2.7	−0.8
BNP	Wayne Taylor	246	2.0	−1.2
Alliance for Green Socialism	Brian Jackson	152	1.2	−1.2
Majority		2,799	22.2	−15.2
Turnout		12,599	72.1	+31.4
Conservative hold		Swing	-7.5	
