= Leeds West and Pudsey =

UK Parliament constituency (since 2024)

Coordinates: 53.80°N 1.64°W

- Borough constituency for the House of Commons
- Interactive map of boundaries since 2024
- Boundary within Yorkshire and the Humber
- County: West Yorkshire
- Major settlements: Leeds (part), Farsley, Pudsey

Current constituency
- Created: 2024
- Member of Parliament: Rachel Reeves (Labour)
- Seats: One
- Created from: Leeds West; Pudsey

Leeds West and Pudsey is a constituency (Note: A borough constituency (for the purposes of election expenses and type of returning officer)) in West Yorkshire represented in the House of Commons of the Parliament of the United Kingdom. It was created by the 2023 periodic review of Westminster constituencies and first contested at the 2024 general election. It is represented by Rachel Reeves of the Labour Party, (Note: As with all constituencies, the constituency elects one Member of Parliament (MP) by the first past the post system of election at least every five years) who also served as Chancellor of the Exchequer in the government of Keir Starmer from 2024 to 2026. Reeves previously served as MP for Leeds West from 2010 to 2024.

== Constituency profile ==
Leeds West and Pudsey is a constituency in West Yorkshire. It covers the western areas of the city of Leeds, including the town of Pudsey, the districts and villages of Farsley, Bramley and Armley and the outlying village of Calverley. Leeds is one of the United Kingdom's largest cities and grew rapidly during the Industrial Revolution as a centre for textile manufacturing, especially wool. Today the city has a diverse economy and is the largest legal and financial centre in England outside of London. Like much of the rest of Leeds, the neighbourhoods in this constituency were heavily involved in the wool trade. The constituency has average levels of wealth with deprivation increasing closer to the city centre; Calverley is affluent whilst Armley is highly-deprived. House prices in the constituency are similar to the rest of Yorkshire and lower than the national average.

In general, residents of Leeds West and Pudsey are young and have average levels of education, income and professional employment. White people made up 85% of the population at the 2021 census. At the local city council, most of the constituency is represented by Labour Party councillors, although Pudsey elected Conservatives. An estimated 55% of voters in the constituency supported leaving the European Union in the 2016 referendum, marginally higher than the nationwide figure of 52%.

== Boundaries ==
The constituency is composed of the following electoral wards of the City of Leeds:

- Armley, Bramley & Stanningley, Calverley & Farsley, and Pudsey.

Armley, Bramley and Stanningley represented about half of the electorate of the former constituency of Leeds West, and Calverley, Farsley and Pudsey represented about half of the electorate of the former constituency of Pudsey.

== Members of Parliament ==
Leeds West and Pudsey prior to 2024

Election	Member	Party
2024	Rachel Reeves	Labour

== Elections ==
=== Elections in the 2020s ===
General election 2024: Leeds West and Pudsey
Party	Candidate	Votes	%	±%
Labour	Rachel Reeves	18,976	49.3	+0.9
Conservative	Lee Farmer	6,584	17.1	−25.1
Reform	Andrea Whitehead	6,281	16.3	+13.5
Green	Ann Forsaith	3,794	9.9	+8.5
Liberal Democrats	Dan Walker	1,743	4.5	+0.9
Workers Party	Jamal El Kheir	633	1.6	N/A
Yorkshire	Darren Longhorn	404	1.0	−0.4
SDP	Sasha Watson	79	0.2	+0.1
Majority		12,392	32.2	+26.0
Turnout		38,494	54.9	−13.4
Registered electors		70,069		
Labour hold		Swing	+13.0	

=== Elections in the 2010s ===
2019 notional result
Party	Vote	%
Labour	23,220	48.4
Conservative	20,257	42.2
Liberal Democrats	1,747	3.6
Brexit Party	1,330	2.8
Others	727	1.6
Green	687	1.4
Turnout	47,968	68.3
Electorate	70,270	

== See also ==
- List of parliamentary constituencies in West Yorkshire
- List of parliamentary constituencies in the Yorkshire and the Humber (region)

== Notes ==
Parliament of the United Kingdom
Preceded by Godalming and Ash	Constituency represented by the chancellor of the Exchequer; 2024–2026	Succeeded by Rawmarsh and Conisbrough
