= Armley (ward) =

Electoral ward in Leeds, England

- Armley highlighted within Leeds
- Population: 17,343 (2023 electorate)
- Metropolitan borough: Leeds
- Metropolitan county: West Yorkshire
- Region: Yorkshire and the Humber
- Country: England
- Sovereign state: United Kingdom
- UK Parliament: Leeds West and Pudsey
- Councillors: Lou Cunningham (Green); Andy Parnham (Labour); Clancy Walker (Green)

Armley is an electoral ward of Leeds City Council in the west of Leeds, West Yorkshire, covering the district of the same name.

== Councillors since 1980 ==
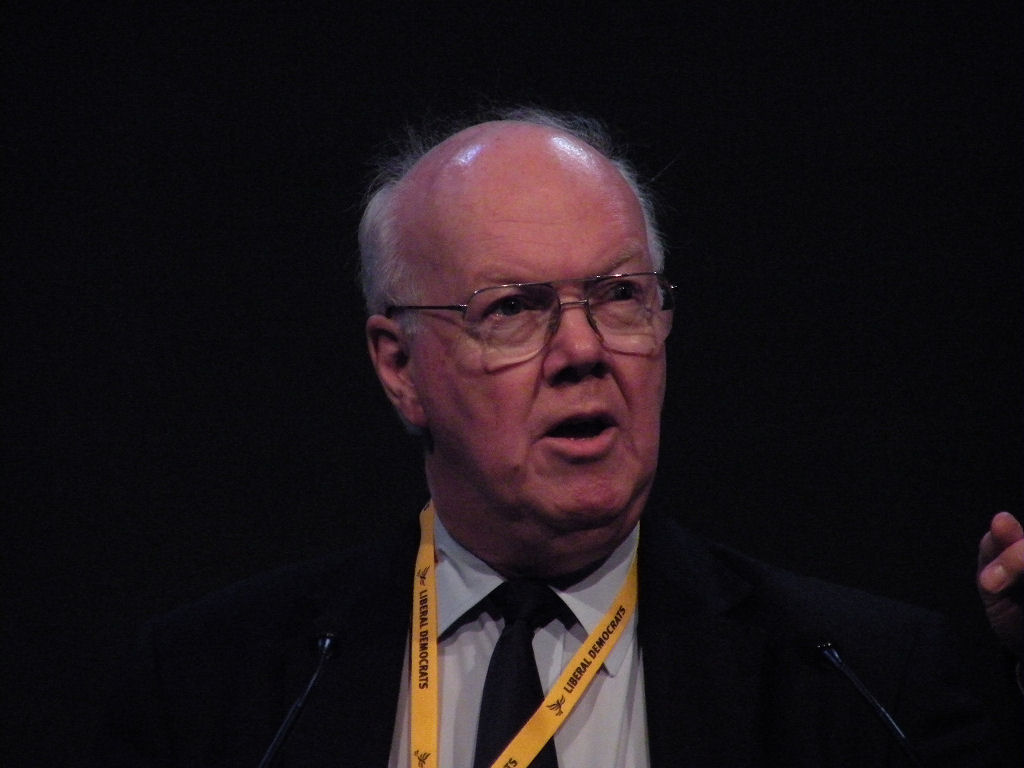
Michael Meadowcroft represented Castleton ward (1968-1973), Armley and Castleton ward (1973-1980) and Armley ward (1980-1983). Member of Parliament for Leeds West (1983-1987).

Election	Councillor	Councillor	Councillor
1980	Michael Meadowcroft (Lib) (Note: Meadowcroft had previously been a ward councillor for Castleton ward from 1968 and then Armley and Castleton ward since 1973.)	David Selby (Lib)	B. Nelson (Lib) (Note: Nelson had been an Armley and Castleton ward councillor since 1973.)
1982	Michael Meadowcroft (Lib)	David Selby (Lib)	M.P. Roberts (Lib)
1983	Michael Meadowcroft (Lib)	David Selby (Lib)	M.P. Roberts (Lib)
1983 by-election	Sandy Melville (Lib) (Note: The by-election was called to replace Michael Meadowcroft, who resigned after becoming Member of Parliament for Leeds West at the 1983 general election. Meadowcroft later contested Bramley ward in 1990 and 1991.)	David Selby (Lib)	M.P. Roberts (Lib)
1984	Sandy Melville (Lib)	David Selby (Lib)	M.P. Roberts (Lib)
January 1986	Sandy Melville (Ind) (Note: Melville left the Liberal Party to sit as an independent councillor.)	David Selby (Lib)	M.P. Roberts (Lib)
1986	Sandy Melville (Ind)	David Selby (Lib)	M.P. Roberts (Lib)
1987	Sandy Melville (Ind)	David Selby (Lib)	M.P. Roberts (Lib)
1988	James McKenna (Lab)	David Selby (SLD)	M.P. Roberts (SLD)
1988 by-election	James McKenna (Lab)	Paul Paley (Lab)	M.P. Roberts (SLD)
1990	James McKenna (Lab)	Paul Paley (Lab)	Alison Lowe (Lab)
1991	James McKenna (Lab)	Paul Paley (Lab)	Alison Lowe (Lab)
1992	James McKenna (Lab)	Paul Paley (Lab)	Alison Lowe (Lab)
1994	James McKenna (Lab)	Paul Paley (Lab)	Alison Lowe (Lab)
1995	James McKenna (Lab)	Paul Paley (Lab)	Alison Lowe (Lab)
1996	James McKenna (Lab)	Paul Paley (Lab)	Alison Lowe (Lab)
1998	James McKenna (Lab)	Paul Paley (Lab)	Alison Lowe (Lab)
1999	James McKenna (Lab)	Janet Harper (Lab) (Note: Harper had previously been a Pudsey North ward councillor from 1994 until losing her seat in 1998.)	Alison Lowe (Lab)
2000	James McKenna (Lab)	Janet Harper (Lab)	Alison Lowe (Lab)
2002	James McKenna (Lab)	Janet Harper (Lab)	Alison Lowe (Lab)
2003	James McKenna (Lab)	Janet Harper (Lab)	Alison Lowe (Lab)
2004	James McKenna (Lab)	Janet Harper (Lab)	Alison Lowe (Lab)
2006	James McKenna (Lab)	Janet Harper (Lab)	Alison Lowe (Lab)
2007	James McKenna (Lab)	Janet Harper (Lab)	Alison Lowe (Lab)
2008	James McKenna (Lab)	Janet Harper (Lab)	Alison Lowe (Lab)
2010	James McKenna (Lab)	Janet Harper (Lab)	Alison Lowe (Lab)
2011	James McKenna (Lab)	Janet Harper (Lab)	Alison Lowe (Lab)
2012	James McKenna (Lab)	Janet Harper (Lab)	Alison Lowe (Lab)
2014	James McKenna (Lab)	Alice Smart (Lab)	Alison Lowe (Lab)
2015	James McKenna (Lab)	Alice Smart (Lab)	Alison Lowe (Lab)
2016	James McKenna (Lab)	Alice Smart (Lab)	Alison Lowe (Lab)
2018	James McKenna (Lab)	Alice Smart (Lab)	Alison Lowe (Lab)
2019	James McKenna (Lab)	Alice Smart (Lab)	Lou Cunningham (Lab)
2021	James McKenna (Lab)	Alice Smart (Lab)	Lou Cunningham (Lab)
2022	James McKenna (Lab)	Alice Smart (Lab)	Lou Cunningham (Lab)
December 2022	James McKenna (Lab)	Alice Smart (Lab)	Lou Cunningham (GPEW) (Note: Cunningham left the Labour Party and joined the Green Party on 17 December 2022. She had previously announced that she would not stand again as the Labour candidate for Armley ward in the 2023 election; upon her defection she announced that she would be the Green Party candidate for the ward in the election.)
2023	James McKenna (Lab)	Alice Smart (Lab)	Andy Parnham (Lab) (Note: Parnham previously represented Farnley and Wortley for the Green Party from September 2008 to 2010.)
2024	Lou Cunningham (GPEW)	Alice Smart (Lab)	Andy Parnham (Lab)
2026	Lou Cunningham* (GPEW)	Clancy Walker* (GPEW)	Andy Parnham* (Lab)

indicates seat up for re-election. indicates seat up for election following resignation or death of sitting councillor. indicates councillor defection. * indicates incumbent councillor.

== Elections since 2010 ==
=== May 2026 ===
2026
Party	Candidate	Votes	%	±%
Green	Clancy Walker	2,215	41.7	▼2.1
Reform	Paul Bickerdike	1,443	27.2	New
Labour	Richard Banks	1,137	21.4	▼20.9
Conservative	Edmond Daramy-Williams	268	5.0	▼1.7
Liberal Democrats	Dan Walker	187	3.5	▲1.3
SDP	John Frank Beal	37	0.7	▼0.1
TUSC	Florian Oscar Alice Hynam	21	0.4	New
Majority		772	14.5	▲13.0
Turnout		5,329	32.0	▲3.6
Rejected ballots		21	0.4	
Registered electors		16,681		
Green gain from Labour		Swing	▲11.5	

=== May 2024 ===
2024
Party	Candidate	Votes	%	±%
Green	Lou Cunningham	2,113	43.8	+4.0
Labour	Richard Banks	2,041	42.3	−1.8
Conservative	Adam Westwood	321	6.7	−3.0
Yorkshire	Rachel Martins	205	4.2	New
Liberal Democrats	Dan Walker	105	2.2	−0.2
SDP	Warwick Bettney	41	0.8	New
Majority		72	1.5	−2.8
Turnout		4,861	28.5	+3.6
Green gain from Labour		Swing	+2.9	

=== May 2023 ===
2023
Party	Candidate	Votes	%	±%
Labour	Andy Parnham	1,897	44.1	−17.9
Green	Lou Cunningham*	1,712	39.8	+24.8
Conservative	Tamas Kovacs	419	9.7	−5.9
Yorkshire	Edana McDonald	129	3.0	N/A
Liberal Democrats	Dan Walker	105	2.4	−2.4
Independent	Jim Miller	39	0.9	N/A
Majority		185	4.3	−42.2
Turnout		4,316	24.9	±0.0
Labour hold		Swing		

=== May 2022 ===
2022
Party	Candidate	Votes	%	±%
Labour	Alice Smart*	2,653	62.0	+5.7
Conservative	Tamas Kovacs	666	15.6	−4.6
Green	Mark Rollinson	642	15.0	−1.1
Liberal Democrats	Dan Walker	205	4.8	+0.6
TUSC	Florian Hynam	85	2.0	+0.4
Majority		1,987	46.5	+10.4
Turnout		4,276	24.9	−4.4
Labour hold		Swing		

=== May 2021 ===
2021
Party	Candidate	Votes	%	±%
Labour	Jim McKenna*	2,858	56.3	−4.4
Conservative	Tamas Kovacs	1,026	20.2	+10.0
Green	Mark Rollinson	815	16.1	+2.8
Liberal Democrats	Dan Walker	211	4.2	−1.3
TUSC	Richard Chaves-Sanderson	83	1.6	N/A
SDP	Andrew Martin	43	0.1	N/A
Majority		1,832	36.1	−11.3
Turnout		5,074	29.3	+4.4
Labour hold		Swing		

=== May 2019 ===
2019
Party	Candidate	Votes	%	±%
Labour	Lou Cunningham	2,477	60.7	+7.3
Green	Keith Whittaker	544	13.3	−0.9
Conservative	Cormac Trigg	415	10.2	−2.6
For Britain	Jim Miller	366	8.9	+3.8
Liberal Democrats	Dan Walker	226	5.5	+2.0
Socialist	Nina Brown	53	1.3	−2.1
Majority		1,933	47.4	+8.2
Turnout		4,111	24.7	−2.1
Labour hold		Swing	+4.1	

=== May 2018 ===
2018
Party	Candidate	Votes	%	±%
Labour	Alice Smart*	2,747	53.4	−2.3
Labour	James McKenna*	2,632		
Labour	Alison Lowe*	2,447		
Green	Andrea Binns	732	14.2	+4.9
Conservative	Matthew Leech	657	12.8	+5.0
Conservative	Nicola Tinsley	565		
Green	Gideon Jones	545		
Conservative	Robert Murphy-Fell	522		
Liberal Democrats	Dan Walker	387	7.5	+3.8
For Britain	James Miller	261	5.1	N/A
Democrats and Veterans	John Withill	184	3.6	N/A
TUSC	Rob Hooper	175	3.4	+2.4
Majority		2,015	39.2	+6.1
Turnout		16,704	26.8	−2.3
Labour hold		Swing		
Labour hold		Swing		
Labour hold		Swing		

=== May 2016 ===
2016
Party	Candidate	Votes	%	±%
Labour	Alison Lowe*	2,726	55.7	+7.4
UKIP	David Caldwell	1,104	22.6	+1.3
Green	David Smith	453	9.3	−2.3
Conservative	Shane Morgan	380	7.8	+4.9
Liberal Democrats	Christine Glover	181	3.7	−0.3
TUSC	Beth Sutcliffe	47	1.0	−0.1
Majority		1,622	33.1	+6.2
Turnout		4,891	29.1	
Labour hold		Swing		

=== May 2015 ===
2015
Party	Candidate	Votes	%	±%
Labour	Jim McKenna*	4,612	48.3	−14.5
UKIP	Dave Caldwell	2,040	21.3	+21.3
Conservative	Shane Mogan	1,314	13.7	−2.9
Green	Nick Crawley	1,108	11.6	−2.7
Liberal Democrats	Christine Glover	381	4.0	−3.0
TUSC	Carole O'Keefe	103	1.1	+1.1
Majority		2,572	26.9	−19.4
Turnout		9,558	54.6	
Labour hold		Swing	-17.9	

=== May 2014 ===
2014
Party	Candidate	Votes	%	±%
Labour	Alice Smart	2,269	43.8	
UKIP	John Withill	1,548	29.9	
Green	Yvonne Clarke	669	12.9	
Conservative	Mohammed Rahman	392	7.6	
Liberal Democrats	Christine Glover	236	4.6	
TUSC	Iain Dalton	65	1.3	
Majority		721		
Turnout		5,179	30.54	
Labour hold		Swing		

=== May 2012 ===
2012
Party	Candidate	Votes	%	±%
Labour	Alison Lowe*	2,686	61.2	−1.6
Green	Jane Morrison	596	13.6	−0.1
Conservative	Ross Burgham	554	12.6	−3.9
Liberal Democrats	Elizabeth Arnott	326	7.4	+0.4
TUSC	Stephen Hobson	229	5.2	+5.2
Majority		2,090	47.6	+1.3
Turnout		4,391		
Labour hold		Swing	-0.7	

=== May 2011 ===
2011
Party	Candidate	Votes	%	±%
Labour	Jim McKenna*	3,428	62.8	+16.6
Conservative	Ross Burgham	901	16.5	+1.3
Green	Jane Morrison	748	13.7	+7.2
Liberal Democrats	Ruth Pecher	382	7.0	−15.6
Majority		2,527	46.3	+22.7
Turnout		5,459	31	
Labour hold		Swing	+7.6	

=== May 2010 ===
2010
Party	Candidate	Votes	%	±%
Labour	Janet Harper*	4,475	46.2	+3.2
Liberal Democrats	Elizabeth Arnott	2,186	22.5	+12.1
Conservative	Gregory Rodwell	1,478	15.2	−3.4
BNP		921	9.5	−5.9
Green	Robert Simpson	635	6.5	−6.0
Majority		2,289	23.6	−0.7
Turnout		9,695	57.1	+29.1
Labour hold		Swing	-4.4	

== See also ==
- Listed buildings in Leeds (Armley Ward)
