= 1946 Leeds City Council election =

1946 UK local government election

The 1946 Leeds municipal elections were held on Saturday 2 November 1946, with one third of the council and vacancies in Burmantofts and Farnley & Wortley to be elected. A handful of wards - Armley & Wortley, Burmantofts, Holbeck North, Hunslet Carr & Middleton and Osmondthorpe - went uncontested.

Rebounding from the heavy defeat the year before, the Conservatives managed a 13% swing to win the popular vote - although that feat went poorly rewarded, as Labour won a comfortable majority of the seats contested and made a net gain to add to their national victory. Elsewhere the Liberal vote was less than half of that the previous year, and the Communists contested this year with three candidates. Turnout seen a slight drop from the prior election to 41.9%.

== Election result ==
Leeds local election result 1946
Party	Seats	Gains	Losses	Net gain/loss	Seats %	Votes %	Votes	+/−
Labour	19	?	?	+1	67.8	44.9	53,865	-12.9
Conservative	9	?	?	-1	32.1	51.4	61,668	+14.3
Liberal	0	0	0	0	0.0	2.9	3,434	-2.1
Communist	0	0	0	0	0.0	0.7	903	New

The result had the following consequences for the total number of seats on the council after the elections:

Party	Previous council		New council	
Party	Cllr	Ald	Cllr	Ald
Labour	58	15	59	15
Conservatives	20	11	19	11
Total	78	26	78	26
Total	104		104	
Working majority	38	4	40	4
Working majority	42		44	

== Ward results ==
Armley & Wortley
Party	Candidate	Votes	%	±%
Labour	A. Marlow	Unopposed	N/A	N/A

Beeston
Party	Candidate	Votes	%	±%
Conservative	P. Gummersall	3,180	45.7	+8.0
Labour	W. Clayton	3,174	45.6	−5.8
Liberal	G. Story	609	8.7	−2.2
Majority		6	0.1	−13.6
Turnout		6,963		

Blenheim
Party	Candidate	Votes	%	±%
Conservative	S. Webster	2,822	55.5	+5.9
Labour	M. Bretherick	2,267	44.5	−5.9
Majority		555	11.0	+9.9
Turnout		5,089		

Bramley
Party	Candidate	Votes	%	±%
Labour	E. Atkinson	4,339	54.9	−0.7
Conservative	A. Baker	3,562	45.1	+12.4
Majority		777	9.8	−13.1
Turnout		7,901		

Burmantofts
Party	Candidate	Votes	%	±%
Labour	G. Murray	Unopposed	N/A	N/A
Labour	W. Shutt	Unopposed	N/A	N/A

Central
Party	Candidate	Votes	%	±%
Labour	A. Lowcock	1,621	62.4	−6.7
Conservative	P. Stead	977	37.6	+6.7
Majority		644	24.8	−13.3
Turnout		2,598		

Cross Gates & Temple Newsam
Party	Candidate	Votes	%	±%
Conservative	H. Adamson	5,583	57.4	+15.0
Labour	L. Walsh	4,136	42.6	−15.0
Majority		1,447	14.8	−0.2
Turnout		9,719		

East Hunslet
Party	Candidate	Votes	%	±%
Labour	L. Naylor	2,163	69.5	+1.5
Liberal	Albert Hope	947	30.5	−1.5
Majority		1,216	39.0	+3.0
Turnout		3,110		

Far Headingley
Party	Candidate	Votes	%	±%
Conservative	G. Martin	6,529	72.3	+5.6
Labour	E. Whitehead	1,808	20.0	−13.2
Liberal	Winifred Underhill	690	7.6	+7.6
Majority		4,721	52.3	+18.8
Turnout		9,027		

Farnley & Wortley
Party	Candidate	Votes	%	±%
Labour	J. Watson	4,246	58.0	−7.5
Labour	J. Wallbanks	4,156		
Conservative	P. Bailey	3,081	42.0	+7.5
Conservative	G. Appleby	3,022		
Majority		1,165	16.0	−15.0
Turnout		7,327		

Harehills
Party	Candidate	Votes	%	±%
Labour	J. Hills	3,944	53.4	−14.7
Conservative	G. Monkman	3,444	46.6	+14.7
Majority		500	6.8	−29.5
Turnout		7,388		

Holbeck North
Party	Candidate	Votes	%	±%
Labour	T. Jessop	Unopposed	N/A	N/A

Holbeck South
Party	Candidate	Votes	%	±%
Labour	F. Burnley	2,110	72.8	+3.5
Liberal	W. Holdsworth	789	27.2	+14.1
Majority		1,321	45.6	−6.0
Turnout		2,899		

Hunslet Carr & Middleton
Party	Candidate	Votes	%	±%
Labour	S. Hand	Unopposed	N/A	N/A

Hyde Park
Party	Candidate	Votes	%	±%
Conservative	H. McKay	4,123	68.8	+11.7
Labour	A. Malcolm	1,866	31.2	−11.7
Majority		2,257	37.7	+23.4
Turnout		5,989		

Kirkstall
Party	Candidate	Votes	%	±%
Labour	H. Happold	3,980	54.4	−4.0
Conservative	H. Sellors	3,332	45.6	+13.8
Majority		648	8.9	−17.8
Turnout		7,312		

Mill Hill & South
Party	Candidate	Votes	%	±%
Conservative	D. Cowling	1,267	51.5	+8.4
Labour	H. Hyams	1,194	48.5	−8.4
Majority		73	3.0	−10.9
Turnout		2,461		

North
Party	Candidate	Votes	%	±%
Conservative	D. Kaberry	7,003	77.7	+20.1
Labour	N. Davey	2,015	22.3	−6.4
Majority		4,988	55.3	+26.5
Turnout		9,018		

Osmondthorpe
Party	Candidate	Votes	%	±%
Labour	F. Potter	Unopposed	N/A	N/A

Potternewton
Party	Candidate	Votes	%	±%
Conservative	J. Mulley	3,124	55.0	+11.5
Labour	B. Weinrib	1,961	34.5	−22.1
Communist	B. Ramelson	598	10.5	+10.5
Majority		1,163	20.5	+7.3
Turnout		5,683		

Richmond Hill
Party	Candidate	Votes	%	±%
Labour	Z. Fernandez	1,519	89.9	N/A
Communist	M. Ramelson	171	10.1	N/A
Majority		1,348	79.8	N/A
Turnout		1,690		N/A

Roundhay
Party	Candidate	Votes	%	±%
Conservative	G. Stevenson	6,953	76.5	+14.4
Labour	A. D'Arcy	2,140	23.5	−14.4
Majority		4,813	52.9	+28.8
Turnout		9,093		

Upper Armley
Party	Candidate	Votes	%	±%
Labour	W. Braham	2,931	48.2	−10.8
Conservative	E. Glover	2,749	45.2	+4.2
Liberal	G. Petch	399	6.6	+6.6
Majority		182	3.0	−15.0
Turnout		6,079		

West Hunslet
Party	Candidate	Votes	%	±%
Labour	T. Ellison	2,668	66.0	−5.1
Conservative	P. Woodward	1,243	30.7	+12.4
Communist	J. Roche	134	3.3	+3.3
Majority		1,425	35.2	−17.5
Turnout		4,045		

Westfield
Party	Candidate	Votes	%	±%
Labour	J. Rafferty	1,392	61.5	−12.6
Conservative	G. Harrison	871	38.5	+12.6
Majority		521	23.0	−25.3
Turnout		2,263		

Woodhouse
Party	Candidate	Votes	%	±%
Labour	H. Nick	2,391	56.7	−5.7
Conservative	S. Taylor	1,825	43.3	+18.7
Majority		566	13.4	−24.4
Turnout		4,216		
