= 2011 Leeds City Council election =

- 5 May 2011

33 of the 99 seats on Leeds City Council 50 seats needed for a majority
	First party	Second party	Third party
Leader	Keith Wakefield	Andrew Carter	Stewart Golton
Party	Labour	Conservative	Liberal Democrats
Last election	20 seats, 35.7%	6 seats, 26.6%	5 seats, 24.5%
Seats won	21	7	2
Seats after	55	21	16
Seat change	▲7	▼1	▼5
Popular vote	99,955	57,927	28,985
Percentage	46.8%	27.1%	13.6%
	Fourth party	Fifth party
Party	Morley Borough Independents	Green
Last election	2 seats, 2.0%	1 seats, 2.4%
Seats won	1	1
Seats after	5	2
Seat change	▼1	Steady
Popular vote	5,718	10,298
Percentage	2.7%	4.8%
- Labour in red (21), Conservatives in blue (7), Liberal Democrats in yellow (2), Greens in light green (1) and Morley Borough Independents in dark green (1).
Council control before election
Minority administration
Labour
Council control after election
Majority administration
Labour

The 2011 Leeds City Council election took place on Thursday 5 May 2011 to elect members of Leeds City Council in England. It was held on the same day as other local elections across the UK.

As per the election cycle, one third of the council's seats were up for election. The councillors subsequently elected replaced those elected when their individual seats were previously contested in 2007.

After forming a minority administration following the 2010 election, the Labour Party regained overall control of the council for the first time since the council had been in no overall control in 2004. Labour gained seven seats, including four from the Liberal Democrats.

== Election summary ==
Leeds City Council Election Result 2011
Party	Seats	Gains	Losses	Net gain/loss	Seats %	Votes %	Votes	+/−
Labour	22	7	0	▲7	66.7	46.8	99,955	+11.1
Conservative	7	1	2	▼1	21.2	27.1	57,927	+0.5
Liberal Democrats	2	0	5	▼5	6.1	13.6	28,985	-10.9
Green	1	0	0	Steady	3.0	4.8	10,298	+2.4
Morley Borough Independent	1	0	1	▼1	3.0	2.7	5,718	+0.7
UKIP	0	0	0	Steady	0.0	2.0	4,383	+1.1
English Democrat	0	0	0	Steady	0.0	1.3	2,698	+1.3
Alliance for Green Socialism	0	0	0	Steady	0.0	0.8	1,727	+0.1
BNP	0	0	0	Steady	0.0	0.5	1,105	-6.3
Independent	0	0	0	Steady	0.0	0.3	582	-0.1
TUSC	0	0	0	Steady	0.0	0.1	252	+0.1

This result had the following consequences for the total number of seats on the council after the elections:

Party	Previous council	New council
Labour	48	55
Conservative	22	21
Liberal Democrat	21	16
Morley Borough Independent	6	5
Green	2	2
Total	99	99
Working majority	-3	11

== Councillors who did not stand for re-election ==
Councillor/s who did not stand for re-election (2)
Councillor	Ward	First elected	Party	Reason	Successor
Andrew Barker	Horsforth	2000	Liberal Democrats	stood down	Dawn Collins (Conservative)
Ruth Feldman	Alwoodley	1999	Conservative	stood down	Dan Cohen (Conservative)

== Ward results ==
Adel & Wharfedale
Party	Candidate	Votes	%	±%
Conservative	Les Carter*	4,144	50.2	+7.0
Liberal Democrats	Christine Shaw	1,758	21.3	−15.5
Labour	Nigel Gill	1,701	20.6	+5.7
Green	Paul Marchant	337	4.1	+1.7
UKIP	Claire Wilson-Sharp	315	3.8	+3.8
Majority		2,386	28.9	+22.5
Turnout		8,255	52	
Conservative hold		Swing	+11.2	

Alwoodley
Party	Candidate	Votes	%	±%
Conservative	Dan Cohen	4,254	53.3	+3.9
Labour	Katy Sian	2,837	35.4	+8.2
UKIP	Warren Hendon	547	6.9	+4.1
Alliance for Green Socialism	Brian Jackson	351	4.4	+3.2
Majority		1,417	17.9	−4.3
Turnout		7,979	45	
Conservative hold		Swing	-2.1	

Ardsley & Robin Hood
Party	Candidate	Votes	%	±%
Labour	Jack Dunn*	2,847	48.7	+7.5
Conservative	Robert Buxton	1,377	23.5	−1.3
English Democrat	Joanna Beverley	880	15.0	+15.0
UKIP	Karen Foster	384	6.6	+2.6
Liberal Democrats	Katherine Bavage	360	6.2	−10.0
Majority		1,470	25.1	+8.7
Turnout		5,848	34	
Labour hold		Swing	+4.4	

Armley
Party	Candidate	Votes	%	±%
Labour	Jim McKenna*	3,428	62.8	+16.6
Conservative	Ross Burgham	901	16.5	+1.3
Green	Jane Morrison	748	13.7	+7.2
Liberal Democrats	Ruth Pecher	382	7.0	−15.6
Majority		2,527	46.3	+22.7
Turnout		5,459	31	
Labour hold		Swing	+7.6	

Beeston & Holbeck
Party	Candidate	Votes	%	±%
Labour	Adam Ogilvie*	2,880	61.3	+13.9
Conservative	Robert Winfield	838	17.8	−1.8
UKIP	Wilfred Woodhouse	425	9.1	+4.8
Green	David Smith	308	6.6	+4.2
Liberal Democrats	Paul Swain	245	5.2	−10.2
Majority		2,042	43.5	+15.8
Turnout		4,696	31	
Labour hold		Swing	+7.8	

Bramley & Stanningley
Party	Candidate	Votes	%	±%
Labour	Ted Hanley*	3,121	60.8	+19.7
Conservative	Alistair McDowall	1,040	20.2	+1.1
Green	Kate Bisson	514	10.0	+6.8
Liberal Democrats	Nathan Fossey	462	9.0	−14.9
Majority		2,081	40.5	+23.4
Turnout		5,137	31	
Labour hold		Swing	+9.3	

Burmantofts & Richmond Hill
Party	Candidate	Votes	%	±%
Labour	Asghar Khan	2,515	51.6	+7.7
Liberal Democrats	David Hollingsworth*	1,779	36.5	+2.6
Green	Peter Exley	356	7.3	+4.8
Conservative	Michael Wheeler	226	4.6	−3.7
Majority		736	15.1	+5.1
Turnout		4,876	32	
Labour gain from Liberal Democrats		Swing	+2.5	

Calverley & Farsley
Party	Candidate	Votes	%	±%
Conservative	Joseph Marjoram*	3,568	48.1	+8.4
Labour	Carol Hughes	3,158	42.6	+8.0
Liberal Democrats	Jude Arbuckle	685	9.2	−10.0
Majority		410	5.5	+0.3
Turnout		7,411	42	
Conservative hold		Swing	+0.2	

Chapel Allerton
Party	Candidate	Votes	%	±%
Labour	Mohammed Rafique*	4,121	63.6	+8.3
Conservative	David Myers	868	13.4	−0.6
Alliance for Green Socialism	Mike Davies	502	7.8	−0.1
Liberal Democrats	Adam Slack	501	7.7	−12.8
Green	Colin Noble	484	7.5	+7.5
Majority		3,253	50.2	+15.4
Turnout		6,476	38	
Labour hold		Swing	+4.4	

City & Hunslet
Party	Candidate	Votes	%	±%
Labour	Patrick Davey*	3,230	62.7	+21.2
Liberal Democrats	Jahangir Aziz	1,047	20.3	−8.8
Conservative	Matthew Wharton	877	17.0	−0.3
Majority		2,183	42.4	+30.0
Turnout		5,154	25	
Labour hold		Swing	+15.0	

Cross Gates & Whinmoor
Party	Candidate	Votes	%	±%
Labour	Pauleen Grahame*	3,653	56.9	+10.9
Conservative	Patrick Hennigan	1,472	22.9	−4.7
UKIP	Darren Oddy	510	7.9	+7.9
Liberal Democrats	Keith Norman	271	4.2	−13.7
Independent	David Hudson	257	4.0	+4.0
Green	Ben Goldthorp	253	3.9	+3.9
Majority		2,181	34.0	+15.6
Turnout		6,416	37	
Labour hold		Swing	+7.8	

Farnley & Wortley
Party	Candidate	Votes	%	±%
Green	Ann Blackburn*	2,995	47.4	+23.1
Labour	Stuart McKenna	2,353	37.3	+4.2
Conservative	Caroline Oldfield	769	12.2	−5.1
Liberal Democrats	Philip Moore	199	3.2	−11.9
Majority		642	10.2	+1.4
Turnout		6,316	35	
Green hold		Swing	+9.4	

Garforth & Swillington
Party	Candidate	Votes	%	±%
Labour	Mark Dobson*	4,906	64.1	+20.4
Conservative	Ryan Stephenson	2,479	32.4	−2.2
Liberal Democrats	Christine Golton	263	3.4	−12.4
Majority		2,427	31.7	+22.5
Turnout		7,648	48	
Labour hold		Swing	+11.3	

Gipton & Harehills
Party	Candidate	Votes	%	±%
Labour	Arif Hussain*	4,805	80.2	+19.8
Liberal Democrats	Qadeer Khan	506	8.4	−16.1
Conservative	Beatrice Greenwood	462	7.7	+0.2
Alliance for Green Socialism	Azar Iqbal	220	3.7	+1.9
Majority		4,299	71.7	+35.9
Turnout		5,993	38	
Labour hold		Swing	+17.9	

Guiseley & Rawdon
Party	Candidate	Votes	%	±%
Conservative	Paul Wadsworth*	3,276	42.8	+2.6
Labour	Mike King	2,853	37.3	+9.1
Liberal Democrats	Cindy Cleasby	778	10.2	−12.9
Green	Colin Avison	529	6.9	+3.5
BNP	Andrew Gallagher	213	2.8	−2.3
Majority		423	5.5	−6.5
Turnout		7,649	44	
Conservative hold		Swing	-3.2	

Harewood
Party	Candidate	Votes	%	±%
Conservative	Rachael Procter*	5,003	67.1	+7.5
Labour	Joshua Blower	1,581	21.2	+3.6
Liberal Democrats	Sara Howell	472	6.3	−10.8
Green	Patricia Capstick	400	5.4	+3.0
Majority		3,442	45.9	+3.9
Turnout		7,456	51	
Conservative hold		Swing	+1.9	

Headingley
Party	Candidate	Votes	%	±%
Labour	Neil Walshaw	1,536	39.6	+13.2
Liberal Democrats	James Monaghan*	1,098	28.3	−22.7
Green	Christopher Foren	682	17.6	+8.5
Conservative	Christina Annesley	370	9.5	−3.0
TUSC	Ian Pattison	88	2.3	+2.3
Independent	David Rudge	69	1.8	+1.8
UKIP	Peter Morgan	39	1.0	+1.0
Majority		438	11.3	−13.3
Turnout		3,882	26	
Labour gain from Liberal Democrats		Swing	+17.9	

Horsforth
Party	Candidate	Votes	%	±%
Conservative	Dawn Collins	2,680	33.7	+8.5
Liberal Democrats	Kate Arbuckle	2,466	31.0	−16.8
Labour	Robert Wilkinson	2,213	27.9	+8.9
UKIP	Paul Hellyer	421	5.3	+2.7
TUSC	Andrew Smith	164	2.1	+2.1
Majority		214	2.7	−20.0
Turnout		7,944	45	
Conservative gain from Liberal Democrats		Swing	+12.6	

Hyde Park & Woodhouse
Party	Candidate	Votes	%	±%
Labour	Gerry Harper*	2,332	57.4	+17.6
Green	Robert Simpson	689	16.9	+9.1
Liberal Democrats	Karim Abdul-Ghaffer	688	16.9	−21.2
Conservative	Shahrukh Malik	356	8.8	−1.5
Majority		1,643	40.4	+38.7
Turnout		4,065	25	
Labour hold		Swing	+4.2	

Killingbeck & Seacroft
Party	Candidate	Votes	%	±%
Labour	Vonnie Morgan*	3,761	73.5	+19.5
Conservative	Billy Flynn	847	16.6	−0.1
Liberal Democrats	Joanne Binns	508	9.9	−6.8
Majority		2,914	57.0	+19.7
Turnout		5,116	31	
Labour hold		Swing	+9.8	

Kippax & Methley
Party	Candidate	Votes	%	±%
Labour	James Lewis*	4,156	63.3	+12.0
Conservative	James Langley	1,428	21.7	−3.1
UKIP	Paul Spivey	609	9.3	+4.2
Liberal Democrats	Anne Bagnall	374	5.7	−7.6
Majority		2,728	41.5	+15.0
Turnout		6,567	41	
Labour hold		Swing	+7.5	

Kirkstall
Party	Candidate	Votes	%	±%
Labour	John Illingworth*	3,634	64.5	+22.1
Conservative	Daniel Whitehouse	680	12.1	−2.9
Liberal Democrats	Chris Lovell	636	11.3	−21.7
Green	Morgan Tatchell-Evans	527	9.4	+4.4
Independent	Stuart Long	157	2.8	+2.8
Majority		2,954	52.4	+43.0
Turnout		5,634	35	
Labour hold		Swing	+12.5	

Middleton Park
Party	Candidate	Votes	%	±%
Labour	Judith Blake*	3,313	64.5	+15.3
BNP	Kevin Meeson	892	17.4	−3.2
Conservative	James McFarland	679	13.2	−1.0
Liberal Democrats	Sadie Fisher	252	4.9	−8.5
Majority		2,421	47.1	+18.5
Turnout		5,136	28	
Labour hold		Swing	+9.2	

Moortown
Party	Candidate	Votes	%	±%
Labour	Rebecca Charlwood	3,688	44.5	+9.3
Liberal Democrats	Brenda Lancaster*	2,834	34.2	−0.1
Conservative	Mark Rowlinson	1,380	16.7	−8.7
Alliance for Green Socialism	Allan House	381	4.6	+2.2
Majority		854	10.3	+9.4
Turnout		8,283	48	
Labour gain from Liberal Democrats		Swing	+4.7	

Morley North
Party	Candidate	Votes	%	±%
Morley Borough Independent	Bob Gettings*	3,642	52.9	+19.5
Labour	Kathryn Rose	1,599	23.2	+0.5
Conservative	Robin Ghosh	874	12.7	−8.4
English Democrat	Tom Redmond	573	8.3	+8.3
Liberal Democrats	Peter Andrews	199	2.9	−8.6
Majority		2,043	29.7	+19.1
Turnout		6,887	39	
Morley Borough Independent hold		Swing	+9.5	

Morley South
Party	Candidate	Votes	%	±%
Labour	Neil Dawson	2,129	33.4	+9.9
Morley Borough Independent	Terry Grayshon*	2,076	32.6	+5.9
English Democrat	Chris Beverley	1,245	19.6	+19.6
Conservative	Neil Hunt	736	11.6	−6.2
Liberal Democrats	Robert Jacques	180	2.8	−8.0
Majority		53	0.8	−2.4
Turnout		6,366	38	
Labour gain from Morley Borough Independent		Swing	+2.0	

Otley & Yeadon
Party	Candidate	Votes	%	±%
Liberal Democrats	Colin Campbell*	3,185	38.6	−6.3
Labour	John Eveleigh	3,026	36.7	+12.8
Conservative	Nigel Francis	2,034	24.7	−0.4
Majority		159	1.9	−17.9
Turnout		8,245	47	
Liberal Democrats hold		Swing	-9.5	

Pudsey
Party	Candidate	Votes	%	±%
Labour Co-op	Richard Lewis*	3,669	53.4	+11.1
Conservative	Jason Aldiss	1,987	28.9	−0.3
UKIP	Phil Banks	636	9.3	+9.3
Green	Irene Dracup	321	4.7	+2.1
Liberal Democrats	Brendan Stubbs	262	3.8	−14.3
Majority		1,682	24.5	+11.4
Turnout		6,875	40	
Labour hold		Swing	+5.7	

Rothwell
Party	Candidate	Votes	%	±%
Labour	Karen Bruce	2,889	46.1	+10.1
Liberal Democrats	Steve Smith*	2,365	37.7	+0.0
Conservative	Louise Turner	1,018	16.2	−3.1
Majority		524	8.4	+6.7
Turnout		6,272	40	
Labour gain from Liberal Democrats		Swing	+5.0	

Roundhay
Party	Candidate	Votes	%	±%
Labour	Christine MacNiven	4,307	50.3	+11.6
Conservative	Valerie Kendall*	2,850	33.3	−0.3
Liberal Democrats	Adam Douglas	578	6.7	−14.7
Green	Paul Ellis	559	6.5	+6.5
Alliance for Green Socialism	Malcolm Scott	273	3.2	−0.4
Majority		1,457	17.0	+11.8
Turnout		8,567	49	
Labour gain from Conservative		Swing	+5.9	

Temple Newsam
Party	Candidate	Votes	%	±%
Labour	Katherine Mitchell	3,707	54.4	+16.8
Conservative	David Schofield*	2,648	38.8	+11.0
Liberal Democrats	Ian Dowling	464	6.8	−7.3
Majority		1,059	15.5	+5.7
Turnout		6,819	42	
Labour gain from Conservative		Swing	+2.9	

Weetwood
Party	Candidate	Votes	%	±%
Liberal Democrats	Sue Bentley*	2,605	39.1	−4.1
Labour	Caroline Gruen	2,072	31.1	+7.9
Conservative	Natalie Oliver	1,282	19.3	−4.8
Green	Martin Hemingway	596	9.0	+3.8
Independent	Alan Procter	99	1.5	+0.5
Majority		533	8.0	−11.2
Turnout		6,654	39	
Liberal Democrats hold		Swing	-6.0	

Wetherby
Party	Candidate	Votes	%	±%
Conservative	Alan Lamb*	4,524	59.9	+7.0
Labour	James Barber	1,945	25.8	+5.0
Liberal Democrats	Jonathan Bentley	583	7.7	−10.8
UKIP	David Macey	497	6.6	+1.4
Majority		2,579	34.2	+2.1
Turnout		7,549	49	
Conservative hold		Swing	+1.0	
