= 1998 Leeds City Council election =

1998 UK local government election

- 7 May 1998

33 of the 99 seats on Leeds City Council 50 seats needed for a majority
	First party	Second party	Third party
Party	Labour	Conservative	Liberal Democrats
Last election	27 seats, 56.2%	3 seats, 23.9%	3 seats, 17.3%
Seats won	25	5	9
Seats after	80	9	9
Seat change	▼2	▲1	Steady
Popular vote	64,368	36,303	25,723
Percentage	49.3%	27.8%	19.7%
Swing	▼6.9pp	▲3.9pp	▲2.4pp
	Fourth party
Party	Green
Last election	0 seats, 1.9%
Seats won	1
Seats after	1
Seat change	▲1
Popular vote	2,997
Percentage	3.6%
Swing	▲1.3%
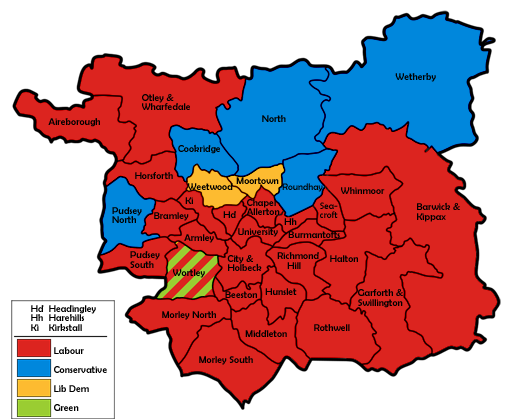
- Map of the results for the 1998 Leeds council election.

The 1998 Leeds City Council election took place on 7 May 1998 to elect members of City of Leeds Metropolitan Borough Council in West Yorkshire, England. One third of the council, alongside a vacancy in Wortley (following Fabian Hamilton's election as Leeds North East MP) were up for election.

The Labour party stayed in overall control of the council. Overall turnout in the election was 24.66%.

== Election result ==
Leeds local election result 1998
Party	Seats	Gains	Losses	Net gain/loss	Seats %	Votes %	Votes	+/−
Labour	25	1	3	-2	73.5	49.3	64,368	-6.9%
Conservative	5	1	0	+1	14.7	27.8	36,303	+3.9%
Liberal Democrats	3	1	1	0	8.8	19.7	25,723	+2.4%
Green	1	1	0	+1	2.9	2.3	2,997	+0.4%
Independent	0	0	0	0	0.0	0.5	642	+0.5%
Socialist	0	0	0	0	0.0	0.3	433	+0.2%
Independent Labour	0	0	0	0	0.0	0.2	209	+0.1%

This result had the following consequences for the total number of seats on the council after the elections:

Party	Previous council	New council
Labour	82	80
Conservative	8	9
Liberal Democrat	9	9
Green	0	1
Total	99	99
Working majority	65	61

== Ward results ==
Aireborough
Party	Candidate	Votes	%	±%
Labour	Moira Dunn	2,862	46.7	+0.6
Conservative	Graham Latty	2,240	36.5	+2.5
Liberal Democrats	Janet Brown	1,033	16.8	−3.1
Majority		622	10.1	−2.0
Turnout		6,135	31.0	
Labour hold		Swing	-0.9	

Armley
Party	Candidate	Votes	%	±%
Labour	Alison Lowe	1,830	62.6	−5.3
Liberal Democrats	Andrew Davies	491	16.8	+9.6
Conservative	Steven Welsh	469	16.1	+4.0
Independent	Keith Rushworth	132	4.5	+4.5
Majority		1,339	45.8	−10.1
Turnout		2,922	18.5	
Labour hold		Swing	-7.4	

Barwick & Kippax
Party	Candidate	Votes	%	±%
Labour	John Parker	3,103	61.7	−8.5
Conservative	Jack Stott	1,303	25.9	+5.2
Liberal Democrats	David Lindley	624	12.4	+3.3
Majority		1,800	35.8	−13.7
Turnout		5,030	27.8	
Labour hold		Swing	-6.8	

Beeston
Party	Candidate	Votes	%	±%
Labour	Angela Gabriel	1,362	55.2	−18.0
Conservative	William Birch	490	19.9	+5.4
Liberal Democrats	Shaun Dolan	475	19.3	+10.6
Socialist	Kevin Pattison	91	3.7	+3.7
Green	Janet Pritchard	49	2.0	−1.7
Majority		872	35.3	−23.4
Turnout		2,467	19.7	
Labour hold		Swing	-11.7	

Bramley
Party	Candidate	Votes	%	±%
Labour	Angela Atkinson	1,863	69.3	−9.1
Liberal Democrats	David Revett	416	15.5	+8.4
Conservative	Michael Best	409	15.2	+7.2
Majority		1,447	53.8	−16.6
Turnout		2,688	16.3	
Labour hold		Swing	-8.2	

Burmantofts
Party	Candidate	Votes	%	±%
Labour	Malcolm Hardy	1,820	69.1	−4.6
Liberal Democrats	Malcolm Betteridge	603	22.9	+2.4
Conservative	Dorothy Schofield	211	8.0	+2.3
Majority		1,217	46.2	−7.0
Turnout		2,634	19.5	
Labour hold		Swing	-3.5	

Chapel Allerton
Party	Candidate	Votes	%	±%
Labour	Neil Taggart	2,204	68.9	−3.9
Conservative	Valerie Kendall	563	17.6	+3.3
Liberal Democrats	Brenda Lancaster	432	13.5	+5.0
Majority		1,641	51.3	−7.3
Turnout		3,199	20.9	
Labour hold		Swing	-3.6	

City & Holbeck
Party	Candidate	Votes	%	±%
Labour	Christiana Myers	1,788	66.3	−13.0
Conservative	David Boynton	339	12.6	+3.1
Liberal Democrats	David Pratt	272	10.1	−1.1
Socialist	David Jones	197	7.3	+7.3
Green	Tania Jackson	100	3.7	+3.7
Majority		1,449	53.7	−14.5
Turnout		2,696	17.2	
Labour hold		Swing	-8.0	

Cookridge
Party	Candidate	Votes	%	±%
Conservative	John Carter	2,848	55.1	+6.4
Labour	John Garvan	1,503	29.1	−6.0
Liberal Democrats	Janet Bates	822	15.9	−0.4
Majority		1,345	26.0	+12.4
Turnout		5,173	31.2	
Conservative hold		Swing	+6.2	

Garforth & Swillington
Party	Candidate	Votes	%	±%
Labour	Karen Groves	3,105	63.3	−8.5
Conservative	Alan Lamb	1,109	22.6	+6.0
Liberal Democrats	Ian Dowling	691	14.1	+2.5
Majority		1,996	40.7	−14.5
Turnout		4,905	26.1	
Labour hold		Swing	-7.2	

Halton
Party	Candidate	Votes	%	±%
Labour	Lee Benson	2,100	46.3	−8.0
Conservative	William Hyde	1,826	40.3	+7.5
Liberal Democrats	David Hollingsworth	605	13.4	+3.4
Majority		274	6.0	−15.5
Turnout		4,531	25.3	
Labour hold		Swing	-7.7	

Harehills
Party	Candidate	Votes	%	±%
Labour	Abdul Malik	1,787	60.7	−11.7
Liberal Democrats	Alan Taylor	674	22.9	+8.8
Conservative	Donald Townsley	274	9.3	−4.2
Independent Labour	Thomas Wray	209	7.1	+7.1
Majority		1,113	37.8	−20.6
Turnout		2,944	20.0	
Labour hold		Swing	-10.2	

Headingley
Party	Candidate	Votes	%	±%
Labour	Doreen Illingworth	1,223	48.7	−14.2
Liberal Democrats	Darren Finlay	599	23.8	+7.9
Conservative	Paul Mowbray	414	16.5	+3.5
Green	Lesley Jeffries	277	11.0	+2.8
Majority		624	24.8	−22.2
Turnout		2,513	12.5	
Labour hold		Swing	-11.0	

Horsforth
Party	Candidate	Votes	%	±%
Liberal Democrats	Christopher Townsley	2,539	46.2	+17.4
Conservative	Lucy Clapham	1,513	27.5	−2.3
Labour	Brian Selby	1,254	22.8	−18.6
Green	Elizabeth Holmes	105	1.9	+1.9
Independent	George Williamson	90	1.6	+1.6
Majority		1,026	18.7	+7.1
Turnout		5,501	31.6	
Liberal Democrats hold		Swing	+9.8	

Hunslet
Party	Candidate	Votes	%	±%
Labour	Mark Davies	1,564	78.2	−7.2
Conservative	Anthony Larvin	188	9.4	+1.9
Liberal Democrats	Pauline Bardon	170	8.5	+1.4
Green	Susan Brierley	79	3.9	+3.9
Majority		1,376	68.8	−9.1
Turnout		2,001	17.2	
Labour hold		Swing	-4.5	

Kirkstall
Party	Candidate	Votes	%	±%
Labour	Bernard Atha	1,993	67.2	−9.0
Conservative	David Higgott	433	14.6	+5.5
Liberal Democrats	Barbara Thompson	322	10.9	+4.9
Green	Mark Pedlar	218	7.3	+1.4
Majority		1,560	52.6	−14.5
Turnout		2,966	18.6	
Labour hold		Swing	-7.2	

Middleton
Party	Candidate	Votes	%	±%
Labour	Linda Middleton	1,940	74.2	−7.3
Conservative	David Schofield	359	13.7	+6.4
Liberal Democrats	Ann Norman	315	12.1	+0.9
Majority		1,581	60.5	−9.9
Turnout		2,614	18.4	
Labour hold		Swing	-6.8	

Moortown
Party	Candidate	Votes	%	±%
Liberal Democrats	Bill Winlow	2,394	48.1	−5.5
Labour	Sheila Saunders	1,676	33.7	+3.4
Conservative	Elizabeth Dibble	906	18.2	+2.1
Majority		718	14.4	−8.9
Turnout		4,976	31.7	
Liberal Democrats hold		Swing	-4.4	

Morley North
Party	Candidate	Votes	%	±%
Labour	Frances Jones	2,327	53.8	−4.6
Conservative	Robert Tesseyman	1,298	30.0	−2.7
Liberal Democrats	Quentin Brown	411	9.5	+0.5
Independent	Peter Walsh	292	6.7	+6.7
Majority		1,029	23.8	−1.8
Turnout		4,328	23.0	
Labour hold		Swing	-0.9	

Morley South
Party	Candidate	Votes	%	±%
Labour	Sherry Bradley	2,368	60.7	−1.4
Conservative	Stephen Kearns	949	24.3	+9.7
Liberal Democrats	David Brayshaw	502	14.9	−8.3
Majority		1,419	36.4	−2.4
Turnout		3,819	18.4	
Labour hold		Swing	-5.5	

North
Party	Candidate	Votes	%	±%
Conservative	Ronald Feldman	2,122	38.1	+6.1
Liberal Democrats	Jane Abramson	1,950	35.0	−1.7
Labour	Andrew Bell	1,494	26.8	−4.3
Majority		172	3.1	−1.6
Turnout		5,566	32.9	
Conservative hold		Swing	+3.9	

Otley & Wharfedale
Party	Candidate	Votes	%	±%
Labour	Philip Coyne	2,251	34.7	−2.3
Conservative	Christine Smith	2,182	33.6	−2.3
Liberal Democrats	Brian Jennings	2,058	31.7	+4.6
Majority		69	1.1	+0.1
Turnout		6,491	34.6	
Labour gain from Liberal Democrats		Swing	+0.0	

Pudsey North
Party	Candidate	Votes	%	±%
Conservative	Frank Robinson	2,661	46.2	−4.7
Labour	Janet Harper	2,501	43.4	+4.7
Liberal Democrats	David Marsay-Smith	600	10.4	+0.0
Majority		160	2.8	−9.3
Turnout		5,762	32.4	
Conservative gain from Labour		Swing	-4.7	

Pudsey South
Party	Candidate	Votes	%	±%
Labour	Richard Lewis	2,262	55.1	−0.6
Conservative	Sheila Jackson	1,040	25.3	+7.2
Liberal Democrats	Nigel Amor	716	17.4	−5.9
Green	Graham Illingworth	90	2.2	−0.6
Majority		1,222	29.7	−2.6
Turnout		4,108	24.3	
Labour hold		Swing	-3.9	

Richmond Hill
Party	Candidate	Votes	%	±%
Labour	Eamonn McGee	1,658	77.4	−7.0
Liberal Democrats	Keith Norman	300	14.0	+3.5
Conservative	Alan Rhodes	184	8.6	+3.5
Majority		1,358	63.4	−10.6
Turnout		2,142	16.1	
Labour hold		Swing	-5.2	

Rothwell
Party	Candidate	Votes	%	±%
Labour	Alec Hudson	2,015	59.1	−5.6
Conservative	John Cowling	712	20.9	+7.1
Liberal Democrats	Mitchell Galdas	682	20.0	−1.5
Majority		1,303	38.2	−5.1
Turnout		3,409	22.3	
Labour hold		Swing	-6.3	

Roundhay
Party	Candidate	Votes	%	±%
Conservative	Peter Harrand	2,299	43.6	+7.7
Labour	Mohammed Iqbal	1,940	36.8	−8.0
Liberal Democrats	Ann Skinner	1,031	19.6	+2.5
Majority		359	6.8	−2.1
Turnout		5,270	31.5	
Conservative hold		Swing	+7.8	

Seacroft
Party	Candidate	Votes	%	±%
Labour	Arthur Vollans	1,983	75.4	−11.9
Conservative	Patricia Hyde	272	10.3	+3.8
Liberal Democrats	Sadie Fisher	194	7.4	+1.1
Independent	Raymond Northgreaves	128	4.9	+4.9
Green	Michael Bolton	54	2.1	+2.1
Majority		1,711	65.0	−15.8
Turnout		2,631	21.4	
Labour hold		Swing	-7.8	

University
Party	Candidate	Votes	%	±%
Labour	Brian Dale	1,327	63.0	−10.9
Liberal Democrats	Shirley Broadbent	289	13.7	+4.2
Conservative	Robert Winfield	217	10.3	+1.2
Socialist	Chris Hill	145	6.9	−0.7
Green	Paul Eade	130	6.2	+6.2
Majority		1,038	49.2	−15.2
Turnout		2,108	12.9	
Labour hold		Swing	-7.5	

Weetwood
Party	Candidate	Votes	%	±%
Liberal Democrats	Stewart Golton	2,200	40.1	+1.7
Labour	Eileen Moxon	1,954	35.7	−4.5
Conservative	Ann Castle	1,155	21.1	+2.4
Green	David Webb	171	3.1	+0.4
Majority		246	4.5	+2.7
Turnout		5,480	34.1	
Liberal Democrats gain from Labour		Swing	+3.1	

Wetherby
Party	Candidate	Votes	%	±%
Conservative	John Procter	3,960	62.1	+5.6
Labour	Reginald Steel	1,807	28.4	−3.7
Liberal Democrats	Sarah May	605	9.5	−1.8
Majority		2,153	33.8	+9.3
Turnout		6,372	30.8	
Conservative hold		Swing	+4.6	

Whinmoor
Party	Candidate	Votes	%	±%
Labour	Martin Hemingway	1,644	58.1	−10.2
Conservative	Richard Williams	854	30.2	+9.8
Liberal Democrats	Graham Roberts	333	11.8	+3.1
Majority		790	27.9	−20.0
Turnout		2,831	20.7	
Labour hold		Swing	-10.0	

Wortley
Party	Candidate	Votes	%	±%
Labour	Malcolm Bedford	1,860	42.4	−11.7
Green	David Blackburn	1,724	39.3	+11.0
Labour	Daphne Riley	1,423		
Green	Claire Nash	1,106		
Conservative	Glenn Broadbent	504	11.5	+1.5
Conservative	Ruby Patel	324		
Liberal Democrats	Michael Daly	295	6.7	−0.8
Majority		301	3.1	−22.7
Turnout		4,383	24.5	
Labour hold		Swing		
Green gain from Labour		Swing	+11.3	

== By-elections between 1998 and 1999 ==
Bramley by-election 6 August 1998 replacing Angus Ross
Party	Candidate	Votes	%	±%
Liberal Democrats	David Revett	1,965	63.9	+48.4
Labour	Stephen Simpson	876	28.5	−40.8
Conservative	Steven Welsh	142	4.6	−10.6
Socialist	David Jones	48	1.6	+1.6
Green	Paul Eade	44	1.4	+1.4
Majority		1,089	35.4	−18.4
Turnout		3,075	18.6	+2.3
Liberal Democrats gain from Labour		Swing	+44.6	
