= 1994 Leeds City Council election =

1994 UK local government election

- 5 May 1994

33 of the 99 seats on Leeds City Council 50 seats needed for a majority
	First party	Second party	Third party
Party	Labour	Conservative	Liberal Democrats
Last election	19 seats, 38.4%	11 seats, 40.7%	2 seats, 16.1%
Seats won	27	4	3
Seats after	67	23	8
Seat change	Steady	Steady	Steady
Popular vote	105,685	45,232	49,595
Percentage	51.3%	22.0%	24.1%
Swing	▲12.9pp	▼18.7pp	▲8.0pp
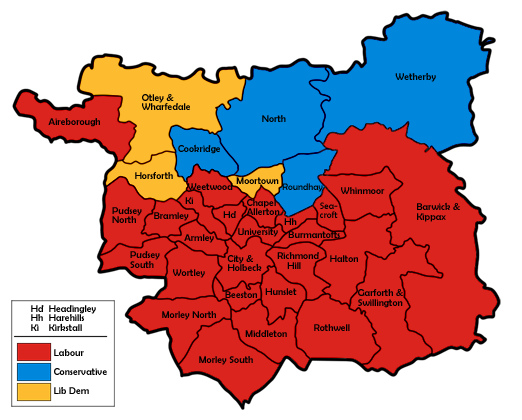
- Map of the results for the 1994 Leeds council election.

The 1994 Leeds City Council elections were held on Thursday, 5 May 1994, with one third of the council up for election, alongside a vacancy in the University ward.

Differing wildly from the previous election, the results were reminiscent of Labour's landslide in the 1990 election, often producing enormous swings. Although falling short of their 1990 vote, Labour were able to win just as comfortably, helped by a significant collapse in Conservative support to a party low and third place in vote. The Lib Dems, who had also suffered a sharp reduction in vote at the last election, gained their highest vote since the merger, and surpassed the Conservatives for the first time. The scale of the Conservative defeat seen another first with their ousting into fourth place in a number of wards by the Liberals and Greens - the latter receiving their strongest result yet, winning just under a fifth of the vote in Wortley.

With the seats last fought at the 1990 election, where the Labour tide had swept everywhere but the northern Conservative-Lib Dem heartlands, Labour's nearest attempt at a gain was found in Roundhay, with the party narrowing the Tory majority there to just 564 votes. The Lib Dems came closest, but despite running the Conservatives close in North ward and Labour in Pudsey South and Weetwood, they were unable to capitalise and steal a fourth seat. As a result, there were no change in seats.

== Election result ==
Leeds local election result 1994
Party	Seats	Gains	Losses	Net gain/loss	Seats %	Votes %	Votes	+/−
Labour	27	0	0	0	79.4	51.3	105,685	+12.9
Conservative	4	0	0	0	11.8	22.0	45,232	-18.7
Liberal Democrats	3	0	0	0	8.8	24.1	49,595	+8.0
Green	0	0	0	0	0.0	1.9	3,861	-0.4
Liberal	0	0	0	0	0.0	0.7	1,400	-0.1

This result has the following consequences for the total number of seats on the council after the elections:

Party	Previous council	New council
Labour	67	67
Conservative	23	23
Liberal Democrat	8	8
Independent	1	1
Total	99	99
Working majority	35	35

== Ward results ==
Aireborough
Party	Candidate	Votes	%	±%
Labour	M. Dunn	4,168	47.2	+15.9
Conservative	G. Latty	2,594	29.4	−21.8
Liberal Democrats	J. Brown	2,060	23.4	+7.9
Majority		1,574	17.8	−2.1
Turnout		8,822		
Labour hold		Swing	+18.8	

Armley
Party	Candidate	Votes	%	±%
Labour	A. Lowe	3,169	61.0	+8.9
Liberal	G. Lawson	773	14.9	+3.7
Liberal Democrats	D. Marsay-Smith	645	12.4	+4.6
Conservative	P. Rayner	608	11.7	−14.1
Majority		2,396	46.1	+19.8
Turnout		5,195		
Labour hold		Swing	+2.6	

Barwick & Kippax
Party	Candidate	Votes	%	±%
Labour	J. Parker	5,184	64.2	+14.1
Conservative	C. Ward	1,799	22.3	−19.5
Liberal Democrats	D. Lindley	1,088	13.5	+5.4
Majority		3,385	41.9	+33.7
Turnout		8,071		
Labour hold		Swing	+16.8	

Beeston
Party	Candidate	Votes	%	±%
Labour	J. Trickett	2,962	70.1	+14.5
Conservative	H. Woodhead	663	15.7	−17.3
Liberal Democrats	S. Scott	603	14.3	+2.8
Majority		2,299	54.4	+31.8
Turnout		4,228		
Labour hold		Swing	+15.9	

Bramley
Party	Candidate	Votes	%	±%
Labour	D. Atkinson	3,685	72.4	+12.0
Liberal Democrats	N. Amor	617	12.1	+6.0
Conservative	M. Best	477	9.4	−13.9
Liberal	C. Pearson	311	6.1	−1.0
Majority		3,068	60.3	+23.2
Turnout		5,090		
Labour hold		Swing	+3.0	

Burmantofts
Party	Candidate	Votes	%	±%
Labour	C. Martin	2,784	54.8	+12.9
Liberal Democrats	K. Norman	2,127	41.9	−8.5
Conservative	G. Castle	165	3.3	−4.4
Majority		657	12.9	+4.5
Turnout		5,076		
Labour hold		Swing	+10.7	

Chapel Allerton
Party	Candidate	Votes	%	±%
Labour	N. Taggart	3,604	66.0	+7.7
Conservative	I. Baxter	856	15.7	−13.2
Liberal Democrats	M. Hashmi	653	12.0	+3.9
Green	E. Jackson	351	6.4	+1.6
Majority		2,748	50.3	+20.9
Turnout		5,464		
Labour hold		Swing	+10.4	

City & Holbeck
Party	Candidate	Votes	%	±%
Labour	C. Myers	3,206	74.2	+8.2
Conservative	D. Boynton	389	9.0	−8.9
Liberal Democrats	D. Pratt	343	7.9	−2.8
Liberal	N. Nowosielski	199	4.6	+4.6
Green	D. Blakemore	184	4.3	−1.1
Majority		2,817	65.2	+17.1
Turnout		4,321		
Labour hold		Swing	+8.5	

Cookridge
Party	Candidate	Votes	%	±%
Conservative	J. Carter	3,016	41.0	−22.6
Labour	A. Procter	2,185	29.7	+11.7
Liberal Democrats	K. Whelan	2,147	29.2	+12.9
Majority		831	11.3	−34.3
Turnout		7,348		
Conservative hold		Swing	-17.1	

Garforth & Swillington
Party	Candidate	Votes	%	±%
Labour	A. Groves	5,235	65.7	+17.4
Conservative	J. Stott	1,455	18.3	−24.3
Liberal Democrats	R. Hutchinson	1,277	16.0	+6.9
Majority		3,780	47.4	+41.6
Turnout		7,967		
Labour hold		Swing	+20.8	

Halton
Party	Candidate	Votes	%	±%
Labour	L. Benson	3,643	50.4	+20.3
Conservative	W. Birch	2,406	33.3	−25.5
Liberal Democrats	A. Appleyard	1,185	16.4	+8.0
Majority		1,237	17.1	−11.5
Turnout		7,234		
Labour hold		Swing	+22.9	

Harehills
Party	Candidate	Votes	%	±%
Labour	T. Ali	2,924	68.0	+3.8
Liberal Democrats	R. Senior	665	15.5	+5.1
Conservative	T. Gerrard	516	12.0	−7.8
Green	A. Tear	198	4.6	−1.0
Majority		2,259	52.5	+8.1
Turnout		4,303		
Labour hold		Swing	-0.6	

Headingley
Party	Candidate	Votes	%	±%
Labour	P. Truswell	3,296	59.7	+11.9
Liberal Democrats	B. Thompson	1,132	20.5	+2.9
Conservative	J. Mortimer	682	12.4	−14.4
Green	P. Alexander	410	7.4	−0.4
Majority		2,164	39.2	+18.2
Turnout		5,520		
Labour hold		Swing	+4.5	

Horsforth
Party	Candidate	Votes	%	±%
Liberal Democrats	C. Townsley	4,469	55.2	+18.2
Conservative	R. Whitehead	2,115	26.1	−24.6
Labour	I. Coulthard	1,510	18.7	+9.1
Majority		2,354	29.1	+15.4
Turnout		8,094		
Liberal Democrats hold		Swing	+21.4	

Hunslet
Party	Candidate	Votes	%	±%
Labour	M. Davies	2,916	81.7	+5.6
Liberal Democrats	G. Melnick	348	9.7	+3.4
Conservative	A. Larvin	306	8.6	−9.0
Majority		2,568	71.9	+13.3
Turnout		3,570		
Labour hold		Swing	+1.1	

Kirkstall
Party	Candidate	Votes	%	±%
Labour	Bernard Atha	3,708	69.5	+11.1
Liberal Democrats	S. Harrison	661	12.4	+12.4
Green	A. Mander	559	10.5	+2.0
Conservative	F. McKimmings	405	7.6	−17.9
Majority		3,047	57.1	+24.2
Turnout		5,333		
Labour hold		Swing	-0.6	

Middleton
Party	Candidate	Votes	%	±%
Labour	L. Middleton	3,378	77.6	+11.6
Liberal Democrats	Q. Brown	525	12.1	+2.1
Conservative	D. Jowett	452	10.4	−13.6
Majority		2,853	65.5	+23.5
Turnout		4,355		
Labour hold		Swing	+4.7	

Moortown
Party	Candidate	Votes	%	±%
Liberal Democrats	W. Winlow	4,164	57.8	+8.5
Conservative	J. Dagwell	1,533	21.3	−14.0
Labour	M. Hussein	1,505	20.9	+7.1
Majority		2,631	36.5	+22.4
Turnout		7,202		
Liberal Democrats hold		Swing	+11.2	

Morley North
Party	Candidate	Votes	%	±%
Labour	F. Jones	3,964	57.4	+16.4
Conservative	C. Halpin	1,966	28.5	−24.0
Liberal Democrats	M. Ewens	974	14.1	+7.6
Majority		1,998	28.9	+17.5
Turnout		6,904		
Labour hold		Swing	+20.2	

Morley South
Party	Candidate	Votes	%	±%
Labour	S. Bradley	3,990	58.0	+8.7
Liberal Democrats	T. Leadley	1,906	27.7	+14.2
Conservative	L. Frost	985	14.3	−21.0
Majority		2,084	30.3	+16.4
Turnout		6,881		
Labour hold		Swing	-2.7	

North
Party	Candidate	Votes	%	±%
Conservative	R. Manning	2,535	38.8	−18.5
Liberal Democrats	S. Umpleby	2,090	32.0	+4.5
Labour	J. Sully	1,765	27.0	+11.9
Green	P. Harris	138	2.1	+2.1
Majority		445	6.8	−23.1
Turnout		6,528		
Conservative hold		Swing	-11.5	

Otley & Wharfedale
Party	Candidate	Votes	%	±%
Liberal Democrats	C. Campbell	3,503	39.3	+11.6
Conservative	J. Bird	2,803	31.4	−22.9
Labour	J. Eveleigh	2,500	28.0	+10.0
Liberal	A. St. Quintin	117	1.3	+1.3
Majority		700	7.8	−18.8
Turnout		8,923		
Liberal Democrats hold		Swing	+17.2	

Pudsey North
Party	Candidate	Votes	%	±%
Labour	J. Harper	3,495	42.7	+20.3
Conservative	C. Holmes	2,506	30.6	−30.7
Liberal Democrats	R. Cam	2,184	26.7	+12.4
Majority		989	12.1	−26.8
Turnout		8,185		
Labour hold		Swing	+25.5	

Pudsey South
Party	Candidate	Votes	%	±%
Labour	R. Lewis	3,267	46.7	+24.2
Liberal Democrats	J. Heppell	2,796	39.9	+34.1
Conservative	G. Winnard	936	13.4	−9.6
Majority		471	6.7	−17.6
Turnout		6,999		
Labour hold		Swing	-4.9	

Richmond Hill
Party	Candidate	Votes	%	±%
Labour	E. McGee	3,359	77.8	+6.3
Liberal Democrats	S. Fisher	623	14.4	+4.0
Conservative	A. Rhodes	338	7.8	−8.0
Majority		2,736	63.3	+7.7
Turnout		4,320		
Labour hold		Swing	+1.1	

Rothwell
Party	Candidate	Votes	%	±%
Labour	A. Hudson	3,666	65.0	+10.5
Liberal Democrats	M. Galdas	1,087	19.3	+1.4
Conservative	A. Heeson	889	15.8	−12.0
Majority		2,579	45.7	+19.0
Turnout		5,642		
Labour hold		Swing	+4.5	

Roundhay
Party	Candidate	Votes	%	±%
Conservative	J. White	2,889	39.1	−18.8
Labour	J. Akhtar	2,347	31.7	+9.7
Liberal Democrats	J. Sefton	1,958	26.5	+10.0
Green	M. Lorrimer-Roberts	204	2.8	+2.8
Majority		542	7.3	−28.5
Turnout		7,398		
Conservative hold		Swing	-14.2	

Seacroft
Party	Candidate	Votes	%	±%
Labour	A. Vollans	3,693	83.6	+6.6
Liberal Democrats	P. Young	403	9.1	+2.7
Conservative	R. Jones	322	7.3	−9.3
Majority		3,290	74.5	+14.2
Turnout		4,418		
Labour hold		Swing	+1.9	

University
Party	Candidate	Votes	%	±%
Labour	B. Dale	2,662	63.5	+2.3
Labour	G. Harper	2,283		
Liberal Democrats	A. Norman	593	14.1	+3.3
Green	A. Begg	551	13.1	+2.8
Liberal Democrats	J. Spencer	415		
Conservative	E. Mann	385	9.2	−8.4
Conservative	R. Winfield	317		
Majority		1,690	49.4	+5.8
Turnout		4,191		
Labour hold		Swing		
Labour hold		Swing	-0.5	

Weetwood
Party	Candidate	Votes	%	±%
Labour	E. Moxon	3,084	40.4	+13.0
Liberal Democrats	J. Ewens	2,654	34.8	+11.4
Conservative	J. Hamilton	1,893	24.8	−21.3
Majority		430	5.6	−13.0
Turnout		7,631		
Labour hold		Swing	+0.8	

Wetherby
Party	Candidate	Votes	%	±%
Conservative	J. Procter	4,493	50.2	−24.3
Liberal Democrats	A. Beck	2,634	29.4	+18.3
Labour	R. Steel	1,827	20.4	+5.9
Majority		1,859	20.8	−39.1
Turnout		8,954		
Conservative hold		Swing	-21.3	

Whinmoor
Party	Candidate	Votes	%	±%
Labour	M. Hemingway	3,326	63.9	+17.0
Conservative	W. Hanbury	1,117	21.4	−18.6
Liberal Democrats	G. Roberts	766	14.7	+1.6
Majority		2,209	42.4	+35.5
Turnout		5,209		
Labour hold		Swing	+17.8	

Wortley
Party	Candidate	Votes	%	±%
Labour	M. Bedford	3,678	57.5	+10.0
Green	D. Blackburn	1,266	19.8	+12.3
Conservative	A. Carter	738	11.5	−20.4
Liberal Democrats	S. Buckingham	715	11.2	+3.8
Majority		2,412	37.7	+22.1
Turnout		6,397		
Labour hold		Swing	-1.1	
