= 1996 Leeds City Council election =

City council elections

- 2 May 1996

33 of the 99 seats on Leeds City Council 50 seats needed for a majority
	First party	Second party	Third party
Party	Labour	Conservative	Liberal Democrats
Last election	30 seats, 59.0%	1 seats, 19.4%	3 seats, 18.4%
Seats won	27	3	3
Seats after	82	8	9
Seat change	▲7	▼8	▲1
Popular vote	89,806	38,229	27,662
Percentage	56.2%	23.9%	17.3%
Swing	▼2.8pp	▲4.5pp	▼1.1pp
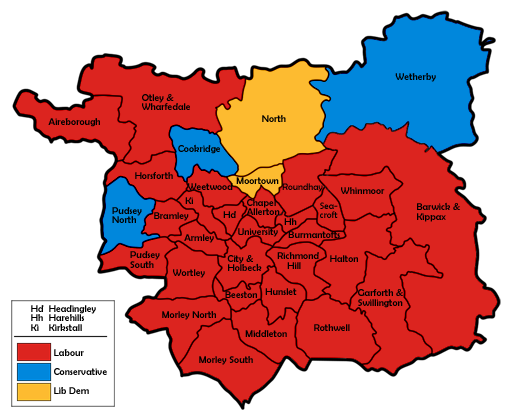
- Map of the results for the 1996 Leeds council election. (Horsforth Requires recolouring)

The 1996 Leeds City Council elections were held on Thursday, 2 May 1996, with a third of the council up for election.

The Conservatives suffered another routing, although with a less impressive Labour vote and a slight recovery in their own vote, were able to hold on to three seats. Labour furthered their stranglehold on the council with an additional seven gains, with all but Burmantofts (Liberal Democrat) and Pudsey South (Independent) from the Tories. As a result of the gains, those two wards - along with the Tory losses of Aireborough, Halton, Morley North and Weetwood wards - were now represented entirely by Labour (a first for most). The other Labour gain was snatching the remaining Tory seat in the former Tory-Liberal battleground of Otley & Wharfedale.

The Lib Dems offset their loss to Labour in Burmantofts with gains from the Tories in Horsforth and the newly three-way marginal North ward. The results, however, were a disappointment to the Lib Dems - evidenced by their poor performance in Otley & Wharfedale, and a vote sunk to their 1992 level. Another parallel to the 1992 election was the slump in overall turnout to a record low.

Peter Kersting's decision to forgo defending his seat for Pudsey South seen the absence of Independents from the council for the first time since 1983. The Greens advanced further into a respectable second place in Wortley, in contrast to the stagnant fortunes of the Liberals and the weakened support for the sole Militant Labour candidate.

== Election result ==
Leeds local election result 1996
Party	Seats	Gains	Losses	Net gain/loss	Seats %	Votes %	Votes	+/−
Labour	27	7	0	+7	84.8	56.2	89,806	-2.8
Conservative	3	0	8	-8	9.1	23.9	38,229	+4.5
Liberal Democrats	3	2	1	+1	6.1	17.3	27,662	-1.1
Green	0	0	0	0	0.0	1.9	3,026	-0.4
Liberal	0	0	0	0	0.0	0.4	677	+0.0
Militant Labour	0	0	0	0	0.0	0.1	232	-0.1
Independent Labour	0	0	0	0	0.0	0.1	98	+0.1

This result had the following consequences for the total number of seats on the council after the elections:

Party	Previous council	New council
Labour	75	82
Conservative	15	8
Liberal Democrat	8	9
Independent	1	0
Total	99	99
Working majority	51	65

== Ward results ==
Aireborough
Party	Candidate	Votes	%	±%
Labour	Tony Addison	3,405	46.1	−4.4
Conservative	Richard Hughes-Rowlands	2,512	34.0	−4.1
Liberal Democrats	Janet Brown	1,476	20.0	+8.5
Majority		893	12.1	−0.3
Turnout		7,393		
Labour gain from Conservative		Swing	-0.1	

Armley
Party	Candidate	Votes	%	±%
Labour	James McKenna	2,568	68.0	−2.3
Conservative	Glenn Broadbent	457	12.1	+2.3
Liberal	George Lawson	334	8.8	−0.9
Liberal Democrats	Andrew Davies	274	7.3	+0.8
Green	Quentin Cooper	145	3.8	+0.1
Majority		2,111	55.9	−4.6
Turnout		3,778		
Labour hold		Swing	-2.3	

Barwick & Kippax
Party	Candidate	Votes	%	±%
Labour	Keith Wakefield	4,481	70.2	−1.0
Conservative	Christopher Ward	1,320	20.7	+1.7
Liberal Democrats	David Lindley	580	9.1	−0.7
Majority		3,161	49.5	−2.7
Turnout		6,381		
Labour hold		Swing	-1.3	

Beeston
Party	Candidate	Votes	%	±%
Labour	David Congreve	2,165	73.2	−3.9
Conservative	William Wild	427	14.4	+2.5
Liberal Democrats	Stephen Sadler	257	8.7	−0.8
Green	Tania Jackson	110	3.7	+2.3
Majority		1,738	58.7	−6.4
Turnout		2,959		
Labour hold		Swing	-3.2	

Bramley
Party	Candidate	Votes	%	±%
Labour	Cherril Cliff	2,788	78.4	−0.7
Conservative	Jagdeep Birdi	285	8.0	−0.1
Liberal Democrats	Nigel Amor	252	7.1	−0.2
Liberal	Elizabeth Bee	232	6.5	+1.0
Majority		2,503	70.4	−0.7
Turnout		3,557		
Labour hold		Swing	-0.3	

Burmantofts
Party	Candidate	Votes	%	±%
Labour	Ronald Grahame	2,441	73.7	+8.8
Liberal Democrats	Sadie Fisher	680	20.5	−10.9
Conservative	Graham Castle	190	5.7	+2.0
Majority		1,761	53.2	+19.7
Turnout		3,311		
Labour gain from Liberal Democrats		Swing	+9.8	

Chapel Allerton
Party	Candidate	Votes	%	±%
Labour	Garth Frankland	3,215	72.8	−0.8
Conservative	Valerie Kendall	630	14.3	+1.2
Liberal Democrats	Ian Findlay	374	8.5	−0.6
Green	Alexander Begg	195	4.4	+1.3
Majority		2,585	58.6	−1.9
Turnout		4,414		
Labour hold		Swing	-1.0	

City & Holbeck
Party	Candidate	Votes	%	±%
Labour	Elizabeth Nash	2,435	79.3	+2.4
Liberal Democrats	Pauline Bardon	342	11.1	+0.9
Conservative	David Boynton	292	9.5	+2.4
Majority		2,093	68.2	+1.4
Turnout		3,069		
Labour hold		Swing	+0.7	

Cookridge
Party	Candidate	Votes	%	±%
Conservative	Keith Loudon	3,120	48.6	+8.9
Labour	Naomi Cummings	2,250	35.1	−5.7
Liberal Democrats	Janet Bates	1,045	16.3	−3.2
Majority		870	13.6	+12.5
Turnout		6,415		
Conservative hold		Swing	+7.3	

Garforth & Swillington
Party	Candidate	Votes	%	±%
Labour	Thomas Murray	4,326	71.8	−1.1
Conservative	Jack Stott	1,000	16.6	+3.7
Liberal Democrats	Ian Dowling	699	11.6	−2.6
Majority		3,326	55.2	−3.5
Turnout		6,025		
Labour hold		Swing	-2.4	

Halton
Party	Candidate	Votes	%	±%
Labour	Randolph Haggerty	2,946	54.3	−3.5
Conservative	David Schofield	1,779	32.8	+1.9
Liberal Democrats	Andrew Appleyard	537	9.9	+1.1
Green	David Harbud	159	2.9	+0.4
Majority		1,167	21.5	−5.4
Turnout		5,421		
Labour gain from Conservative		Swing	-2.7	

Harehills
Party	Candidate	Votes	%	±%
Labour	Mohammed Khan	2,259	72.4	−8.6
Liberal Democrats	Ann Norman	439	14.1	+6.5
Conservative	Walter Buckland	421	13.5	+5.8
Majority		1,820	58.4	−14.9
Turnout		3,119		
Labour hold		Swing	-7.5	

Headingley
Party	Candidate	Votes	%	±%
Labour	Sarah Perrigo	2,667	62.9	−6.0
Liberal Democrats	Barbara Thompson	675	15.9	+2.0
Conservative	Michael Gledhill	552	13.0	+2.6
Green	Peggy Alexander	348	8.2	+1.3
Majority		1,992	47.0	−7.9
Turnout		4,242		
Labour hold		Swing	-4.0	

Horsforth
Party	Candidate	Votes	%	±%
Liberal Democrats	Roger Harris	2,530	41.4	−2.2
Conservative	Mary Addison	1,823	29.8	+5.5
Labour	Roland Cross	1,759	28.8	−2.1
Majority		707	11.6	−1.1
Turnout		6,112		
Liberal Democrats gain from Conservative		Swing	+2.5	

Hunslet
Party	Candidate	Votes	%	±%
Labour	Geoffrey Driver	2,295	85.4	−0.3
Conservative	Anthony Larvin	202	7.5	+2.1
Liberal Democrats	Simon Buckingham	191	7.1	+1.1
Majority		2,093	77.9	−1.8
Turnout		2,688		
Labour hold		Swing	-1.2	

Kirkstall
Party	Candidate	Votes	%	±%
Labour	Elizabeth Minkin	3,060	76.2	−1.1
Conservative	Steven Welsh	364	9.1	+3.4
Liberal Democrats	Mark Pattenden	241	6.0	+0.2
Green	Alison Mander	240	6.0	−3.5
Liberal	Noel Nowosielski	111	2.8	+1.0
Majority		2,696	67.1	−0.7
Turnout		4,016		
Labour hold		Swing	-2.2	

Middleton
Party	Candidate	Votes	%	±%
Labour	Jack Dunn	2,630	81.6	−1.7
Liberal Democrats	Shaun Dolan	360	11.2	+5.2
Conservative	Stephen McBarron	235	7.3	−0.7
Majority		2,270	70.4	−4.9
Turnout		3,225		
Labour hold		Swing	-3.4	

Moortown
Party	Candidate	Votes	%	±%
Liberal Democrats	Mark Harris	3,014	53.6	+4.0
Labour	Malcolm Hardy	1,705	30.3	−1.3
Conservative	Elizabeth Dibble	908	16.1	−0.6
Majority		1,309	23.3	+5.4
Turnout		5,627		
Liberal Democrats hold		Swing	+2.6	

Morley North
Party	Candidate	Votes	%	±%
Labour	Michael Dawson	3,026	58.3	−8.0
Conservative	Alan Barraclough	1,696	32.7	+12.7
Liberal Democrats	Quentin Brown	465	9.0	+0.0
Majority		1,330	25.6	−20.7
Turnout		5,187		
Labour gain from Conservative		Swing	-10.3	

Morley South
Party	Candidate	Votes	%	±%
Labour	Bryan North	3,103	62.1	−1.3
Liberal Democrats	Thomas Leadley	1,163	23.3	+0.1
Conservative	Jan Galek	731	14.6	+1.2
Majority		1,940	38.8	−1.4
Turnout		4,997		
Labour hold		Swing	-0.7	

North
Party	Candidate	Votes	%	±%
Liberal Democrats	Jonathan Brown	2,221	36.8	+7.2
Conservative	Peter Harrand	1,936	32.1	−1.6
Labour	Brian Selby	1,883	31.2	−4.0
Majority		285	4.7	+3.1
Turnout		6,040		
Liberal Democrats gain from Conservative		Swing	+4.4	

Otley & Wharfedale
Party	Candidate	Votes	%	±%
Labour	John Eveleigh	2,648	37.0	+2.8
Conservative	Charles Norman Hindle	2,574	35.9	+10.9
Liberal Democrats	Dawn Merrick	1,943	27.1	−13.7
Majority		74	1.0	−5.7
Turnout		7,165		
Labour gain from Conservative		Swing	-4.0	

Pudsey North
Party	Candidate	Votes	%	±%
Conservative	Andrew Carter	3,566	50.8	+16.8
Labour	Sandra Womack	2,717	38.7	−12.6
Liberal Democrats	Rodney Cam	731	10.4	−4.2
Majority		849	12.1	−5.1
Turnout		7,014		
Conservative hold		Swing	+14.7	

Pudsey South
Party	Candidate	Votes	%	±%
Labour	Eugene "Mick" Coulson	2,748	55.7	−0.8
Liberal Democrats	Rodney Keighley	1,154	23.4	−6.9
Conservative	Sheila Jackson	896	18.2	+4.9
Green	Graham Illingworth	138	2.8	+2.8
Majority		1,594	32.3	+6.1
Turnout		4,936		
Labour gain from Independent		Swing	+3.0	

Richmond Hill
Party	Candidate	Votes	%	±%
Labour	Michael Lyons	2,453	84.4	−0.2
Liberal Democrats	Keith Norman	304	10.5	−0.1
Conservative	William Birch	149	5.1	+0.3
Majority		2,149	74.0	−0.1
Turnout		2,906		
Labour hold		Swing	-0.0	

Rothwell
Party	Candidate	Votes	%	±%
Labour	Lorna Cohen	2,736	64.7	−8.1
Liberal Democrats	Mitchell Galdas	908	21.5	+5.2
Conservative	Anne Heeson	582	13.8	+2.9
Majority		1,828	43.3	−13.2
Turnout		4,226		
Labour hold		Swing	-6.6	

Roundhay
Party	Candidate	Votes	%	±%
Labour	Jean White	2,712	44.8	+1.0
Conservative	Margaret Burnell	2,173	35.9	+2.1
Liberal Democrats	Wilfred Pickard	1,031	17.0	−1.4
Green	Andrew Ketchin	138	2.3	−1.7
Majority		539	8.9	−1.2
Turnout		6,054		
Labour hold		Swing	-0.5	

Seacroft
Party	Candidate	Votes	%	±%
Labour	Graham Hyde	3,050	87.3	+1.9
Conservative	Roy Jones	227	6.5	−0.4
Liberal Democrats	Malcolm Betteridge	218	6.2	−1.5
Majority		2,823	80.8	+3.2
Turnout		3,495		
Labour hold		Swing	+1.1	

University
Party	Candidate	Votes	%	±%
Labour	Maggie Giles-Hill	2,264	73.9	+4.1
Liberal Democrats	David Freeman	290	9.5	+1.7
Conservative	Robert Winfield	279	9.1	+2.4
Militant Labour	Chris Hill	232	7.6	-2.6
Majority		1,974	64.4	+0.9
Turnout		3,065		
Labour hold		Swing	+1.2	

Weetwood
Party	Candidate	Votes	%	±%
Labour	Judith Blake	2,569	40.2	−2.6
Liberal Democrats	Penny Joan Ewens	2,455	38.4	+0.7
Conservative	Ann Castle	1,195	18.7	+1.6
Green	Claire Nash	171	2.7	+0.4
Majority		114	1.8	−3.3
Turnout		6,390		
Labour gain from Conservative		Swing	-1.6	

Wetherby
Party	Candidate	Votes	%	±%
Conservative	David Clark	4,451	56.6	+10.2
Labour	Reginald Steel	2,523	32.1	+0.3
Liberal Democrats	Geoffrey Melnick	892	11.3	−10.6
Majority		1,928	24.5	+9.9
Turnout		7,866		
Conservative hold		Swing	+4.9	

Whinmoor
Party	Candidate	Votes	%	±%
Labour	Suzanne Armitage	2,568	68.3	−2.7
Conservative	Richard Williams	767	20.4	+4.0
Liberal Democrats	Graham Roberts	326	8.7	−0.5
Independent Labour	Anthony Thorpe	98	2.6	+2.6
Majority		1,801	47.9	−6.7
Turnout		3,759		
Labour hold		Swing	-3.3	

Wortley
Party	Candidate	Votes	%	±%
Labour	Philip Towler	2,640	54.1	−7.5
Green	David Blackburn	1,382	28.3	+6.5
Conservative	Michael Best	490	10.0	+1.7
Liberal Democrats	David Brayshaw	366	7.5	−0.7
Majority		1,258	25.8	−13.9
Turnout		4,878		
Labour hold		Swing	-7.0	

== By-elections between 1996 and 1998 ==
Beeston by-election 14 November 1996 replacing Jon Trickett (resigned)
Party	Candidate	Votes	%	±%
Labour	Angela Gabriel	1,025	47.4	−25.8
Liberal Democrats		864	40.0	+31.3
Conservative		187	8.7	−5.7
Militant Labour		44	2.0	+2.0
Green		42	1.9	−1.8
Majority		161	7.4	−51.3
Turnout		2,162	17.0	−6.2
Labour hold		Swing	-28.5	

Headingley by-election 10 July 1997 replacing Paul Truswell (resigned)
Party	Candidate	Votes	%	±%
Labour	David Black	919	51.0	−11.9
Liberal Democrats		647	35.9	+20.0
Conservative		235	13.0	+0.0
Majority		272	15.1	−31.9
Turnout		1,801	9.1	−12.4
Labour hold		Swing	-15.9	

Whinmoor by-election 21 August 1997 replacing Elaine Pickard
Party	Candidate	Votes	%	±%
Labour	Peter Gruen	1,569	54.1	−14.2
Conservative		1,077	37.1	+16.7
Liberal Democrats		225	7.8	−0.9
Independent		28	1.0	+1.0
Majority		492	17.0	−30.9
Turnout		2,899	21.1	−6.3
Labour hold		Swing	-15.4	
