= Clive Lord =

British political activist

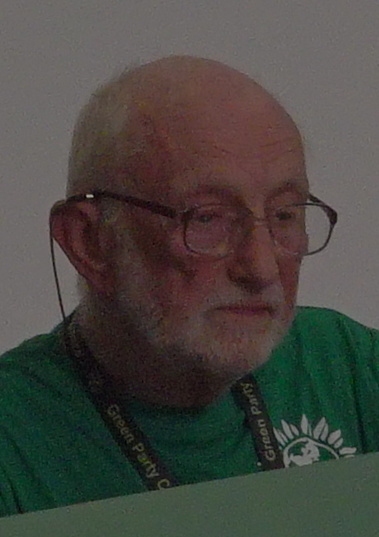
Clive Lord, in 2016.

Clive Richard Lord is a British political activist and long serving member of the Green Party of England and Wales. He was one of the first members of the PEOPLE Party, which later became the Green Party, and split to make three separate Green Parties. He has also campaigned widely for the introduction of basic income. He was a candidate in the 2016 leadership election.

== Political career ==
Lord stood for the PEOPLE Party in the February 1974 general election in Leeds North East, winning 0.7% of the vote. In 1975, the PEOPLE Party became the Ecology Party, and in 1985 the Green Party. In 1990, the Green Party split into three parties: the Scottish Greens and the Green Party Northern Ireland. The Wales Green Party became an autonomous regional party and remained within the new Green Party of England and Wales. Lord thus became a member of the Green Party of England and Wales.

Lord is a campaigner for basic income, writing in 1993 that: "I'm afraid I cannot retire from Green politics until the significance of the Basic Income is understood and taken for granted on all sides: it will enable us to emerge from recession without returning to indiscriminate economic growth that will destroy itself, and us with it." In 2003, he published a book, A Citizens' Income: A Foundation for a Sustainable World, which outlined his personal philosophy and political beliefs. In 2012, he co-edited a second book, Citizen’s Income and Green Economics.

In June 2016, Lord announced his intentions to stand for Leader of the Green Party in the upcoming 2016 leadership election. In his election statement, he stated that he wanted Andrew Cooper, who ended up standing for Deputy Leader, to be Leader.

== Electoral performance ==
Date of election	Constituency	Party	Votes	% of votes	Result
2005 general election	Batley and Spen	Green	649	1.7	Not elected
2001 general election	Batley and Spen	Green	595	1.5	Not elected
1997 general election	Batley and Spen	Green	384	0.8	Not elected
1992 general election	Batley and Spen	Green	628	1.0	Not elected
1983 general election	Batley and Spen	Ecology	493	0.9	Not elected
1979 general election	Batley and Morley	Ecology	460	1.0	Not elected
Feb. 1974 general election	Leeds North East	PEOPLE	300	0.7	Not elected
