= 1984 Leeds City Council election =

1984 UK local government election

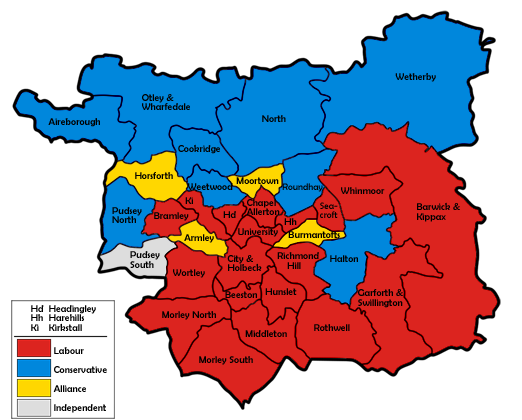
Map of the results for the 1984 Leeds council election.

The 1984 Leeds City Council elections were held on Thursday, 3 May 1984, with one third of the council to be elected. In the interim there had been a by-election in Armley to replace the incumbent councillor Michael Meadowcroft after he was elected the Leeds West MP, resulting in an Alliance hold.

The Conservative's downward trend continued after the previous year's respite to a new party low, resulting in a 3% swing to Labour. In contrast, the Alliance support stabilised after the prior year's fall to retain a healthy proportion of their initial 1982 surge. Despite the swing towards them, Labour finished the night with a net loss, as the Alliance won the only remaining Burmantofts seat they did not hold from them. The Alliance also gained in Moortown, winning their first seat in the ward from the Conservatives - who lost another in Pudsey South to their former incumbent turn Independent, achieving the feat of first elected Independent onto the council.

== Election result ==
Leeds local election result 1984
Party	Seats	Gains	Losses	Net gain/loss	Seats %	Votes %	Votes	+/−
Labour	19	0	1	-1	57.6	42.7	91,314	+2.6
Conservative	9	1	2	-1	27.3	33.0	70,431	-3.3
Alliance	4	2	1	+1	12.1	22.6	48,335	-0.4
Independent	1	1	0	+1	3.0	1.3	2,770	+1.1
Ecology	0	0	0	0	0.0	0.2	531	+0.1
Communist	0	0	0	0	0.0	0.1	308	-0.1

This result has the following consequences for the total number of seats on the council after the elections:

Party	Previous council	New council
Labour	54	53
Conservatives	34	33
Alliance	11	12
Independent	0	1
Total	99	99
Working majority	9	7

== Ward results ==
Aireborough
Party	Candidate	Votes	%	±%
Conservative	W. Hudson	3,515	42.7	−0.5
Labour	M. Dunn	2,550	31.0	+3.4
Alliance (Liberal)	M. Cooksey	2,167	26.3	−2.9
Majority		965	11.7	−2.3
Turnout		8,232		
Conservative hold		Swing	-1.9	

Armley
Party	Candidate	Votes	%	±%
Alliance (Liberal)	Sandy Melville	3,328	55.9	+10.1
Labour	J. Appleyard	1,756	29.5	−3.3
Conservative	H. Hinchliffe	872	14.6	−6.0
Majority		1,572	26.4	+13.4
Turnout		5,956		
Alliance hold		Swing	+6.7	

Barwick & Kippax
Party	Candidate	Votes	%	±%
Labour	F. Flatters	3,802	50.3	+0.8
Conservative	J. Tweddle	2,971	39.3	−0.5
Alliance (SDP)	N. Snowdon	793	10.5	−0.2
Majority		831	11.0	+1.3
Turnout		7,566		
Labour hold		Swing	+0.6	

Beeston
Party	Candidate	Votes	%	±%
Labour	A. Beevers	3,102	62.6	+8.3
Conservative	W. Birch	1,400	28.3	−4.2
Alliance (SDP)	L. Shaffner	417	8.4	−4.8
Independent	A. Ali	35	0.7	+0.7
Majority		1,702	34.4	+12.5
Turnout		4,954		
Labour hold		Swing	+6.2	

Bramley
Party	Candidate	Votes	%	±%
Labour	A. Siantonas	2,939	53.2	+1.5
Alliance (Liberal)	C. Pearson	1,856	33.6	+2.5
Conservative	P. Netzel	731	13.2	−4.0
Majority		1,083	19.6	−1.0
Turnout		5,526		
Labour hold		Swing	-0.5	

Burmantofts
Party	Candidate	Votes	%	±%
Alliance (Liberal)	N. Mackie	3,730	50.5	+4.9
Labour	S. Armitage	3,244	43.9	+1.4
Conservative	S. Temple	416	5.6	−4.6
Majority		486	6.6	+3.4
Turnout		7,390		
Alliance gain from Labour		Swing	+1.7	

Chapel Allerton
Party	Candidate	Votes	%	±%
Labour	J. Frankland	3,555	59.8	−0.3
Conservative	J. Moore	1,590	26.8	−0.1
Alliance (Liberal)	C. Smith	717	12.1	−1.0
Communist	J. Rodgers	78	1.3	+1.3
Majority		1,965	33.1	−0.1
Turnout		5,940		
Labour hold		Swing	-0.1	

City & Holbeck
Party	Candidate	Votes	%	±%
Labour	B. Sanderson	3,354	69.2	+4.8
Alliance (Liberal)	K. Hawkins	959	19.8	−0.7
Conservative	H. Woodhead	534	11.0	−4.1
Majority		2,395	49.4	+5.5
Turnout		4,847		
Labour hold		Swing	+2.7	

Cookridge
Party	Candidate	Votes	%	±%
Conservative	K. Loudon	3,619	48.7	−7.2
Alliance (Liberal)	P. Kelley	2,241	30.2	+4.5
Labour	C. Ashley	1,569	21.1	+2.7
Majority		1,387	18.5	−11.8
Turnout		7,429		
Conservative hold		Swing	-5.8	

Garforth & Swillington
Party	Candidate	Votes	%	±%
Labour	G. Moakes	4,235	51.6	+7.5
Conservative	N. May	3,070	37.4	−5.3
Alliance (SDP)	P. Wilson	896	10.9	−2.2
Majority		1,165	14.2	+12.9
Turnout		8,201		
Labour hold		Swing	+6.4	

Halton
Party	Candidate	Votes	%	±%
Conservative	M. Dodgson	3,823	53.2	−6.0
Labour	E. McGee	2,504	34.9	+9.8
Alliance (SDP)	D. Mortimer	855	11.9	−3.8
Majority		1,319	18.4	−15.8
Turnout		7,182		
Conservative hold		Swing	-7.9	

Harehills
Party	Candidate	Votes	%	±%
Labour	L. Cohen	3,252	64.2	−0.9
Conservative	M. Cohen	1,194	23.6	+0.8
Alliance (Liberal)	J. Foster	623	12.3	+0.2
Majority		2,058	40.6	−1.7
Turnout		5,069		
Labour hold		Swing	-0.8	

Headingley
Party	Candidate	Votes	%	±%
Labour	A. Larsen	3,480	56.8	+3.2
Conservative	D. Flowers	1,688	27.5	−4.7
Alliance (SDP)	K. Lee	691	11.3	−0.8
Ecology	G. Rainford	213	3.5	+3.5
Communist	I. Dixon	58	0.9	−1.1
Majority		1,792	29.2	+7.8
Turnout		6,130		
Labour hold		Swing	+3.9	

Horsforth
Party	Candidate	Votes	%	±%
Alliance (Liberal)	S. Cooksey	4,037	48.9	+4.9
Conservative	J. Stevens	3,451	41.8	−4.0
Labour	L. Smith	762	9.2	−0.9
Majority		586	7.1	+5.3
Turnout		8,250		
Alliance hold		Swing	+4.4	

Hunslet
Party	Candidate	Votes	%	±%
Labour	G. Driver	3,379	82.8	−0.7
Alliance (Liberal)	S. Gillen	369	9.0	+2.2
Conservative	H. Lavery	333	8.2	−1.5
Majority		3,010	73.8	−0.1
Turnout		4,081		
Labour hold		Swing	-1.4	

Kirkstall
Party	Candidate	Votes	%	±%
Labour	E. Nash	3,418	54.9	−1.3
Conservative	A. Walkington	1,415	22.7	−4.5
Alliance (Liberal)	P. Meadowcroft	1,322	21.3	+5.9
Communist	B. Jackson	66	1.1	−0.1
Majority		2,003	32.2	+3.2
Turnout		6,221		
Labour hold		Swing	+1.6	

Middleton
Party	Candidate	Votes	%	±%
Labour	J. Kitchen	2,946	74.8	+1.0
Conservative	A. Larvin	612	15.5	−1.5
Alliance (Liberal)	D. Howard	381	9.7	+0.5
Majority		2,334	59.3	+2.6
Turnout		3,939		
Labour hold		Swing	+1.2	

Moortown
Party	Candidate	Votes	%	±%
Alliance (SDP)	M. Harris	3,355	45.0	+10.3
Conservative	C. Thomas	2,967	39.8	−8.0
Labour	C. Dews	1,129	15.2	−2.3
Majority		388	5.2	−7.9
Turnout		7,451		
Alliance gain from Conservative		Swing	+9.1	

Morley North
Party	Candidate	Votes	%	±%
Labour	P. Jones	3,521	51.1	+9.3
Conservative	R. Halpin	2,845	41.3	−5.2
Alliance (Liberal)	E. Ayres	527	7.6	−4.0
Majority		676	9.8	+5.1
Turnout		6,893		
Labour hold		Swing	+7.2	

Morley South
Party	Candidate	Votes	%	±%
Labour	B. North	3,723	60.9	+10.7
Conservative	A. Grayson	1,682	27.5	−4.5
Alliance (Liberal)	H. Smith	709	11.6	+1.7
Majority		2,041	33.4	+15.3
Turnout		6,114		
Labour hold		Swing	+7.6	

North
Party	Candidate	Votes	%	±%
Conservative	A. O'Brien	3,128	51.6	−9.9
Alliance (SDP)	G. Shaffner	1,681	27.7	+6.0
Labour	J. Langan	1,255	20.7	+3.8
Majority		1,447	23.9	−15.9
Turnout		6,064		
Conservative hold		Swing	-7.9	

Otley & Wharfedale
Party	Candidate	Votes	%	±%
Conservative	C. Hindle	4,108	43.6	+5.7
Alliance (Liberal)	H. Morgan	3,871	41.1	−10.2
Labour	M. Attwood	1,303	13.8	+5.3
Ecology	A. Laurence	138	1.5	−0.8
Majority		237	2.5	−10.8
Turnout		9,420		
Conservative gain from Alliance		Swing	+7.9	

Pudsey North
Party	Candidate	Votes	%	±%
Conservative	A. Carter	4,402	51.1	+1.0
Labour	J. Hodgson	3,188	37.0	+6.6
Alliance (SDP)	J. Stott	1,021	11.9	−7.6
Majority		1,214	14.1	−5.6
Turnout		8,611		
Conservative hold		Swing	-2.8	

Pudsey South
Party	Candidate	Votes	%	±%
Independent	P. Kersting	2,735	36.7	+36.7
Labour	R. Lewis	2,340	31.4	−8.0
Conservative	H. Gill	1,582	21.2	−15.4
Alliance (Liberal)	A. Booker	791	10.6	−13.4
Majority		395	5.3	+2.5
Turnout		7,448		
Independent gain from Conservative		Swing		

Richmond Hill
Party	Candidate	Votes	%	±%
Labour	M. Lyons	3,853	56.2	+5.9
Alliance (Liberal)	K. Norman	2,618	38.2	−2.9
Conservative	D. Boynton	381	5.6	−1.8
Majority		1,235	18.0	+8.8
Turnout		6,852		
Labour hold		Swing	+4.4	

Rothwell
Party	Candidate	Votes	%	±%
Labour	R. Lund	3,871	68.3	+9.3
Conservative	M. Dalton	1,234	21.8	−5.5
Alliance (SDP)	S. Browning	564	9.9	−3.0
Majority		2,637	46.5	+14.7
Turnout		5,669		
Labour hold		Swing	+7.4	

Roundhay
Party	Candidate	Votes	%	±%
Conservative	P. Crotty	4,045	61.0	−2.5
Alliance (Liberal)	L. Thackray	1,358	20.5	+0.4
Labour	F. Hamilton	1,230	18.5	+2.1
Majority		2,687	40.5	−2.9
Turnout		6,633		
Conservative hold		Swing	-1.4	

Seacroft
Party	Candidate	Votes	%	±%
Labour	George Mudie	3,459	72.0	+4.1
Conservative	B. Caro	963	20.0	−0.9
Alliance (SDP)	S. Richmond	381	7.9	−3.2
Majority		2,496	52.0	+5.1
Turnout		4,803		
Labour hold		Swing	+2.5	

University
Party	Candidate	Votes	%	±%
Labour	W. Kilgallon	3,149	70.7	+4.7
Conservative	M. Killick	639	14.4	−4.1
Alliance (Liberal)	J. Staines	558	12.5	−1.0
Communist	R. Honey	106	2.4	+0.4
Majority		2,510	56.4	+8.9
Turnout		4,452		
Labour hold		Swing	+4.4	

Weetwood
Party	Candidate	Votes	%	±%
Conservative	A. Lodge	2,955	41.1	−4.9
Labour	J. Page	2,759	38.3	+3.9
Alliance (SDP)	J. MacArthur	1,301	18.1	−1.5
Ecology	C. Nash	180	2.5	+2.5
Majority		196	2.7	−8.8
Turnout		7,195		
Conservative hold		Swing	-4.4	

Wetherby
Party	Candidate	Votes	%	±%
Conservative	H. Gardiner	4,624	70.3	+1.5
Alliance (Liberal)	T. Burgess	1,129	17.2	−3.3
Labour	R. Bishop	820	12.5	+1.7
Majority		3,495	53.2	+4.9
Turnout		6,573		
Conservative hold		Swing	+2.4	

Whinmoor
Party	Candidate	Votes	%	±%
Labour	F. Stringer	2,992	53.5	+5.2
Conservative	J. Howard	1,977	35.4	−1.4
Alliance (SDP)	M. Lance	620	11.1	−3.7
Majority		1,015	18.2	+6.6
Turnout		5,589		
Labour hold		Swing	+3.3	

Wortley
Party	Candidate	Votes	%	±%
Labour	W. Thurlow	2,875	41.0	−2.5
Alliance (Liberal)	A. Gilchrist	2,469	35.2	+7.5
Conservative	A. Stephenson	1,665	23.8	−5.1
Majority		406	5.8	−8.8
Turnout		7,009		
Labour hold		Swing	-5.0	

== By-elections between 1984 and 1986 ==
Beeston by-election 27 September 1984 replacing Michael McGowan (resigned)
Party	Candidate	Votes	%	±%
Labour	Jon Trickett	1,784	55.5	−7.1
Conservative	John Birch	909	28.3	−0.0
Alliance (SDP)	Terence Ayres	519	16.2	+7.8
Majority		875	27.2	−7.2
Turnout		3,212	23.0	
Labour hold		Swing	-3.5	
