= 1987 Leeds City Council election =

1987 UK local government election

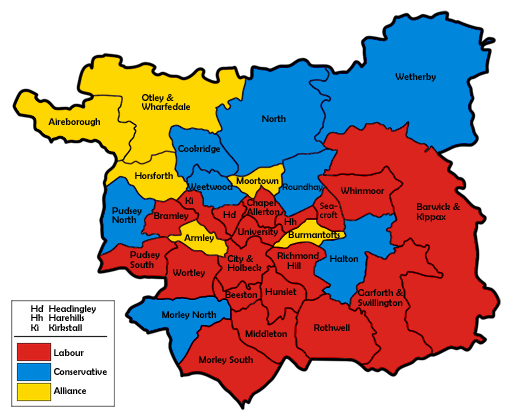
Map of the results for the 1987 Leeds council election.

The 1987 Leeds City Council elections were held on Thursday, 7 May 1987, with one third of the council and a vacancy in Wetherby to be elected. Prior to the election, the Alliance had gained the Aireborough seat from the Conservatives in a by-election.

An upsurge in turnout brought with it a greater Conservative and Alliance vote, with a 3.5% swing from Labour to Conservative narrowing things back towards a three-way race. Despite the Conservatives managing to reverse much of their recent decline, they were still unable to win back Aireborough, or halt Alliance gains in Moortown and Horsforth, although running them close in the latter. They fared better in contests with Labour, defending their remaining seat in Morley North and getting within 192 votes of regaining Pudsey South. Labour also seen a strong challenge in Headingley from the Alliance, with their majority slashed to 320 votes. With the two gains achieved on the night by the Alliance from Tory, Labour's majority remained unchanged.

== Election result ==
Leeds local election result 1987
Party	Seats	Gains	Losses	Net gain/loss	Seats %	Votes %	Votes	+/−
Labour	19	0	0	0	55.9	38.1	90,933	-3.8
Conservative	9	0	2	-2	26.5	33.1	78,990	+3.3
Alliance	6	2	0	+2	17.6	28.3	67,459	+0.7
Green	0	0	0	0	0.0	0.3	833	-0.1
Communist	0	0	0	0	0.0	0.1	224	-0.0
Independent	0	0	0	0	0.0	0.1	191	+0.0

This result has the following consequences for the total number of seats on the council after the elections:

Party	Previous council	New council
Labour	58	58
Conservative	27	25
Alliance	12	14
Independent	2	2
Total	99	99
Working majority	17	17

== Ward results ==
Aireborough
Party	Candidate	Votes	%	±%
Alliance (Liberal)	J. Brown	3,937	43.7	+10.4
Conservative	S. Bainbridge	3,324	36.9	−1.3
Labour	M. Dunn	1,752	19.4	−9.1
Majority		613	6.8	+1.9
Turnout		9,013		
Alliance hold		Swing	+5.8	

Armley
Party	Candidate	Votes	%	±%
Alliance (Liberal)	D. Selby	3,092	45.7	+4.0
Labour	B. Cliff	2,446	36.2	−5.1
Conservative	H. Hinchliffe	1,221	18.1	+2.0
Majority		646	9.6	+9.2
Turnout		6.759		
Alliance hold		Swing	+4.5	

Barwick & Kippax
Party	Candidate	Votes	%	±%
Labour	M. Monks	4,508	51.8	−0.3
Conservative	B. Caro	2,902	33.4	+0.2
Alliance (SDP)	N. Snowdon	1,285	14.8	+0.1
Majority		1,606	18.5	−0.5
Turnout		8,695		
Labour hold		Swing	-0.2	

Beeston
Party	Candidate	Votes	%	±%
Labour	L. Hodgson	2,712	55.1	−5.9
Conservative	H. Woodhead	1,361	27.6	+4.3
Alliance (SDP)	K. Galvin	850	17.3	+1.6
Majority		1,351	27.4	−10.2
Turnout		4,923		
Labour hold		Swing	-5.1	

Bramley
Party	Candidate	Votes	%	±%
Labour	A. Miller	3,578	55.6	−1.7
Alliance (Liberal)	M. Tones	1,665	25.9	−0.5
Conservative	R. Kent	1,194	18.5	+2.2
Majority		1,913	29.7	−1.2
Turnout		6,437		
Labour hold		Swing	-0.6	

Burmantofts
Party	Candidate	Votes	%	±%
Alliance (Liberal)	S. Sadler	3,284	48.6	−1.5
Labour	B. Ewart	2,990	44.2	+0.4
Conservative	J. Higham	489	7.2	+1.6
Majority		294	4.3	−1.9
Turnout		6,763		
Alliance hold		Swing	-0.9	

Chapel Allerton
Party	Candidate	Votes	%	±%
Labour	C. Clarke	4,018	58.4	−4.5
Conservative	C. Jones	1,760	25.6	+4.0
Alliance (Liberal)	T. Garbett	1,105	16.1	+0.5
Majority		2,258	32.8	−8.5
Turnout		6,883		
Labour hold		Swing	-4.2	

City & Holbeck
Party	Candidate	Votes	%	±%
Labour	E. Morris	3,289	65.1	−4.5
Alliance (Liberal)	D. Hollingsworth	949	18.8	+1.2
Conservative	M. Lindsey	812	16.1	+3.3
Majority		2,340	46.3	−5.8
Turnout		5,050		
Labour hold		Swing	-2.8	

Cookridge
Party	Candidate	Votes	%	±%
Conservative	A. Wheatley	4,495	52.7	+5.0
Alliance (Liberal)	M. Cooksey	2,733	32.1	−2.5
Labour	M. St. David-Smith	1,297	15.2	−2.5
Majority		1,762	20.7	+7.6
Turnout		8,525		
Conservative hold		Swing	-3.7	

Garforth & Swillington
Party	Candidate	Votes	%	±%
Labour	J. Ratchford	4,065	44.3	−0.7
Conservative	M. Stelling	3,367	36.7	+2.7
Alliance (SDP)	E. Ayres	1,749	19.1	−2.0
Majority		698	7.6	−3.4
Turnout		9,181		
Labour hold		Swing	-1.7	

Halton
Party	Candidate	Votes	%	±%
Conservative	W. Hyde	4,378	55.1	+11.0
Labour	M. Burton	1,845	23.2	−8.7
Alliance (SDP)	T. Ayres	1,726	21.7	−2.3
Majority		2,533	31.9	+19.7
Turnout		7,949		
Conservative hold		Swing	+9.8	

Harehills
Party	Candidate	Votes	%	±%
Labour	M. Simmons	3,425	50.2	−1.0
Alliance (Liberal)	C. Holden	2,621	38.4	+3.2
Conservative	K. Weightman	775	11.4	−1.0
Majority		804	11.8	−4.2
Turnout		6,821		
Labour hold		Swing	-2.1	

Headingley
Party	Candidate	Votes	%	±%
Labour	J. Thomas	3,102	40.9	−6.5
Alliance (Liberal)	A. Shaw	2,782	36.7	+8.5
Conservative	G. Mercer	1,227	16.2	−2.0
Green	G. Rainford	407	5.4	+0.1
Communist	I. Dixon	64	0.8	−0.1
Majority		320	4.2	−15.1
Turnout		7,582		
Labour hold		Swing	-7.5	

Horsforth
Party	Candidate	Votes	%	±%
Alliance (Liberal)	B. Rich	3,708	44.1	−2.0
Conservative	H. Lavery	3,465	41.3	+2.5
Labour	I. Hugill	1,227	14.6	−0.5
Majority		243	2.9	−4.5
Turnout		8,400		
Alliance gain from Conservative		Swing	-2.2	

Hunslet
Party	Candidate	Votes	%	±%
Labour	John Battle	3,469	79.7	+3.4
Alliance (Liberal)	R. Senior	446	10.2	−1.2
Conservative	A. Silver	440	10.1	−0.3
Majority		3,023	69.4	+4.6
Turnout		4,355		
Labour hold		Swing	+2.3	

Kirkstall
Party	Candidate	Votes	%	±%
Labour	J. Illingworth	3,392	52.9	−4.1
Alliance (Liberal)	N. Batterham	1,728	26.9	+1.6
Conservative	C. Mollitt	1,296	20.2	+2.5
Majority		1,664	25.9	−5.7
Turnout		6,416		
Labour hold		Swing	-2.8	

Middleton
Party	Candidate	Votes	%	±%
Labour	J. Taylor	3,145	67.1	−5.3
Conservative	A. Larvin	776	16.6	+1.9
Alliance (SDP)	J. Readman	572	12.2	+0.1
Independent	R. Burness	191	4.1	+4.1
Majority		2,369	50.6	−7.2
Turnout		4,684		
Labour hold		Swing	-3.6	

Moortown
Party	Candidate	Votes	%	±%
Alliance (SDP)	M. Crompton	4,003	46.4	−4.5
Conservative	V. Kendall	3,154	36.6	+3.9
Labour	A. Hollas	1,463	17.0	+0.7
Majority		849	9.8	−8.4
Turnout		8,620		
Alliance gain from Conservative		Swing	-4.2	

Morley North
Party	Candidate	Votes	%	±%
Conservative	R. Binks	3,547	45.4	+8.0
Labour	F. Jones	3,074	39.4	−4.8
Alliance (SDP)	P. Haywood	1,184	15.2	−3.2
Majority		473	6.1	−0.6
Turnout		7,805		
Conservative hold		Swing	+6.4	

Morley South
Party	Candidate	Votes	%	±%
Labour	R. Mitchell	3,377	49.8	−7.2
Conservative	A. Clayton	2,310	34.1	+7.2
Alliance (SDP)	H. Smith	1,092	16.1	+0.0
Majority		1,067	15.7	−14.4
Turnout		6,779		
Labour hold		Swing	-7.2	

North
Party	Candidate	Votes	%	±%
Conservative	R. Feldman	4,221	51.1	+3.9
Alliance (SDP)	K. Lee	3,136	38.0	+1.0
Labour	R. Glassford	899	10.9	−4.8
Majority		1,085	13.1	+2.8
Turnout		8,256		
Conservative hold		Swing	+1.4	

Otley & Wharfedale
Party	Candidate	Votes	%	±%
Alliance (Liberal)	G. Kirkland	4,632	44.1	+1.4
Conservative	G. Francis	4,250	40.5	+2.4
Labour	S. Egan	1,369	13.0	−3.1
Green	A. Stevens	246	2.3	−0.7
Majority		382	3.6	−1.1
Turnout		10,497		
Alliance hold		Swing	-0.5	

Pudsey North
Party	Candidate	Votes	%	±%
Conservative	I. Favell	4,017	43.9	+5.0
Alliance (Liberal)	C. Garner	2,871	31.4	+2.1
Labour	J. McKenna	2,253	24.6	−7.1
Majority		1,146	12.5	+5.3
Turnout		9,141		
Conservative hold		Swing	+1.4	

Pudsey South
Party	Candidate	Votes	%	±%
Labour	A. Hickinson	2,886	39.1	−4.1
Conservative	J. Mortimer	2,694	36.5	+5.1
Alliance (SDP)	P. Garbutt	1,809	24.5	−1.1
Majority		192	2.6	−9.2
Turnout		7,389		
Labour hold		Swing	-4.6	

Richmond Hill
Party	Candidate	Votes	%	±%
Labour	P. Winn	3,779	65.8	−3.3
Alliance (Liberal)	K. Norman	1,224	21.3	−0.3
Conservative	D. Boynton	742	12.9	+4.7
Majority		2,555	44.5	−3.0
Turnout		5,745		
Labour hold		Swing	-1.5	

Rothwell
Party	Candidate	Votes	%	±%
Labour	B. Walker	3,647	58.2	−6.8
Conservative	A. Heeson	1,778	28.4	+8.0
Alliance (SDP)	S. Cohen	837	13.4	−1.2
Majority		1,869	29.8	−14.8
Turnout		6,262		
Labour hold		Swing	-7.4	

Roundhay
Party	Candidate	Votes	%	±%
Conservative	P. Gruen	4,401	54.4	+1.8
Alliance (Liberal)	S. Holland	2,172	26.8	−3.0
Labour	K. Prior	1,520	18.8	+1.2
Majority		2,229	27.5	+4.8
Turnout		8,093		
Conservative hold		Swing	+2.4	

Seacroft
Party	Candidate	Votes	%	±%
Labour	D. Gabb	3,183	65.0	−6.8
Alliance (SDP)	D. Parr	911	18.6	+6.3
Conservative	H. Townsley	800	16.3	−1.4
Majority		2,272	46.4	−10.5
Turnout		4,894		
Labour hold		Swing	-6.5	

University
Party	Candidate	Votes	%	±%
Labour	N. Sloan	3,165	63.7	−7.0
Alliance (SDP)	J. Clifton	858	17.3	+2.0
Conservative	A. Savage	784	15.8	+4.4
Communist	R. Honey	160	3.2	+0.6
Majority		2,307	46.4	−9.0
Turnout		4,967		
Labour hold		Swing	-4.5	

Weetwood
Party	Candidate	Votes	%	±%
Conservative	S. Gill	3,684	41.9	+4.1
Alliance (Liberal)	J. Ewens	2,554	29.0	+4.5
Labour	J. Langan	2,378	27.0	−8.3
Green	C. Nash	180	2.0	−0.3
Majority		1,130	12.8	+10.3
Turnout		8,796		
Conservative hold		Swing	-0.2	

Wetherby
Party	Candidate	Votes	%	±%
Conservative	D. Hudson	5,472	61.7	−0.4
Conservative	J. Evans	5,337		
Alliance (Liberal)	T. Burgess	2,296	25.9	+1.2
Alliance (SDP)	J. Macarthur	1,753		
Labour	J. Taylor	1,096	12.4	−0.8
Labour	J. Postill	1,006		
Majority		3,041	35.8	−1.6
Turnout		8,864		
Conservative hold		Swing		
Conservative hold		Swing	-0.8	

Whinmoor
Party	Candidate	Votes	%	±%
Labour	R. Blower	3,399	51.3	−2.5
Conservative	M. Silversides	2,226	33.6	+1.2
Alliance (Liberal)	R. Hutchinson	998	15.1	+1.3
Majority		1,173	17.7	−3.7
Turnout		6,623		
Labour hold		Swing	-1.8	

Wortley
Party	Candidate	Votes	%	±%
Labour	Fabian Hamilton	3,185	42.7	−3.5
Alliance (Liberal)	L. Thackray	2,650	35.5	+2.0
Conservative	L. Hargreaves	1,628	21.8	+2.7
Majority		535	7.2	−5.4
Turnout		7,463		
Labour hold		Swing	-2.7	
