= 1986 Leeds City Council election =

1986 UK local government election

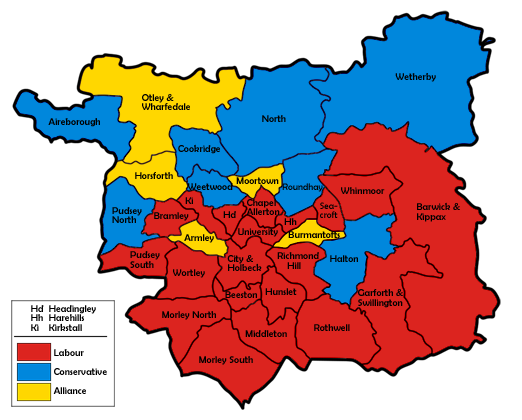
Map of the results for the 1986 Leeds council election.

The 1986 Leeds City Council elections were held on Thursday, 8 May 1986, with one third of the council and a vacancy in Halton to be elected, following the resignation by Conservative incumbent Martin Dodgson in March. Prior to that, there had been a defection by the former-Alliance councillor in Armley, Sandy Melville, to Independent in January and a sacking (from committees) and de-selection as Labour candidate for Wortley for Pat Fathers after he was found to be leaking information the previous December.

Although largely a re-run of the last election's wins (with an extra victory in Pudsey South) for Labour, these seats having been last fought in the 1982 election with a much stronger performance from the Conservatives resulted in a handful of gains for Labour. The Conservatives continued their decline, winning less than a quarter of the wards for the first time, with their wins mostly confined to the north of the city facing an increasingly competitive Alliance there. The Alliance, resurgent after much of their 1982 spike had looked to be ebbing away, were now close to usurping the Conservatives for second place in votes.

Labour captured the remaining Tory seats in Barwick & Kippax and Garforth & Swillington, and increased their representation in Morley North and Pudsey South with gains from the weakened Conservatives there. Labour also gained the sole Alliance seat in Richmond Hill, and came within 26 votes from gaining Armley from them. The Alliance however managed to offset their loss with a gain of their own in Moortown, ousting prominent Tory Sydney Symmonds.

== Election result ==
Leeds local election result 1986
Party	Seats	Gains	Losses	Net gain/loss	Seats %	Votes %	Votes	+/−
Labour	20	5	0	+5	58.8	41.9	91,312	-0.8
Conservative	9	0	5	-5	26.5	29.8	64,949	-3.2
Alliance	5	1	1	0	14.7	27.6	60,036	+5.0
Green	0	0	0	0	0.0	0.4	861	+0.2
Communist	0	0	0	0	0.0	0.1	223	-0.0
Revolutionary Communist	0	0	0	0	0.0	0.1	151	+0.1
Independent	0	0	0	0	0.0	0.1	135	-1.2
BNP	0	0	0	0	0.0	0.0	69	+0.0
National Front	0	0	0	0	0.0	0.0	58	+0.0

This result has the following consequences for the total number of seats on the council after the elections:

Party	Previous council	New council
Labour	53	58
Conservatives	33	28
Alliance	11	11
Independent	2	2
Total	99	99
Working majority	7	17

== Ward results ==
Aireborough
Party	Candidate	Votes	%	±%
Conservative	J. Atkinson	3,260	38.2	−4.5
Alliance (Liberal)	J. Brown	2,841	33.3	+7.0
Labour	M. Dunn	2,432	28.5	−2.5
Majority		419	4.9	−6.8
Turnout		8,533		
Conservative hold		Swing	-5.7	

Armley
Party	Candidate	Votes	%	±%
Alliance (Liberal)	M. Roberts	2,465	41.7	−14.2
Labour	L. Hodgson	2,439	41.3	+11.8
Conservative	E. McKimmings	951	16.1	+1.5
Independent	S. McBarron	55	0.9	+0.9
Majority		26	0.4	−26.0
Turnout		5,910		
Alliance hold		Swing	-13.0	

Barwick & Kippax
Party	Candidate	Votes	%	±%
Labour	J. Parker	4,111	52.2	+1.9
Conservative	B. Rowley	2,612	33.2	−6.1
Alliance (SDP)	N. Snowdon	1,155	14.7	+4.2
Majority		1,499	19.0	+8.0
Turnout		7,878		
Labour gain from Conservative		Swing	+4.0	

Beeston
Party	Candidate	Votes	%	±%
Labour	Jon Trickett	2,812	61.0	−1.7
Conservative	H. Woodhead	1,078	23.4	−4.9
Alliance (Liberal)	S. Holland	723	15.7	+7.3
Majority		1,734	37.6	+3.2
Turnout		4,613		
Labour hold		Swing	+1.6	

Bramley
Party	Candidate	Votes	%	±%
Labour	D. Atkinson	3,302	57.3	+4.1
Alliance (Liberal)	M. Tones	1,522	26.4	−7.2
Conservative	L. Hargreaves	940	16.3	+3.1
Majority		1,780	30.9	+11.3
Turnout		5,764		
Labour hold		Swing	+5.6	

Burmantofts
Party	Candidate	Votes	%	±%
Alliance (Liberal)	M. Clay	3,399	50.0	−0.4
Labour	B. Ewart	2,977	43.8	−0.1
Conservative	C. Jones	380	5.6	+0.0
Communist	M. Monkman	37	0.5	+0.5
Majority		422	6.2	−0.4
Turnout		6,793		
Alliance hold		Swing	-0.1	

Chapel Allerton
Party	Candidate	Votes	%	±%
Labour	N. Taggart	3,845	62.9	+3.0
Conservative	B. Sampford	1,318	21.6	−5.2
Alliance (Liberal)	T. Garbett	953	15.6	+3.5
Majority		2,527	41.3	+8.2
Turnout		6,116		
Labour hold		Swing	+4.1	

City & Holbeck
Party	Candidate	Votes	%	±%
Labour	C. Myers	3,350	69.6	+0.4
Alliance (Liberal)	J. Clay	845	17.6	−2.2
Conservative	G. Dye	617	12.8	+1.8
Majority		2,505	52.1	+2.7
Turnout		4,812		
Labour hold		Swing	+1.3	

Cookridge
Party	Candidate	Votes	%	±%
Conservative	J. Carter	3,788	47.7	−1.0
Alliance (Liberal)	M. Cooksey	2,748	34.6	+4.4
Labour	B. Dale	1,406	17.7	−3.4
Majority		1,040	13.1	−5.4
Turnout		7,942		
Conservative hold		Swing	-2.7	

Garforth & Swillington
Party	Candidate	Votes	%	±%
Labour	A. Groves	3,743	45.0	−6.7
Conservative	N. May	2,825	34.0	−3.5
Alliance (SDP)	E. Ayres	1,752	21.1	+10.1
Majority		918	11.0	−3.2
Turnout		8,320		
Labour gain from Conservative		Swing	-1.6	

Halton
Party	Candidate	Votes	%	±%
Conservative	D. Schofield	3,142	44.1	−9.1
Conservative	D. Wood	3,028		
Labour	M. Burton	2,270	31.9	−3.0
Labour	K. Prior	2,099		
Alliance (SDP)	A. Readman	1,712	24.0	+12.1
Alliance (SDP)	T. Ayres	1,608		
Majority		758	12.2	−6.2
Turnout		7,124		
Conservative hold		Swing		
Conservative hold		Swing	-3.0	

Harehills
Party	Candidate	Votes	%	±%
Labour	T. Briggs	3,031	51.2	−13.0
Alliance (Liberal)	C. Holden	2,084	35.2	+22.9
Conservative	K. Weightman	730	12.3	−11.2
Revolutionary Communist	E. Oliver	75	1.3	+1.3
Majority		947	16.0	−24.6
Turnout		5,920		
Labour hold		Swing	-17.9	

Headingley
Party	Candidate	Votes	%	±%
Labour	Paul Truswell	3,317	47.4	−9.4
Alliance (Liberal)	A. Shaw	1,970	28.2	+16.9
Conservative	S. Gordon	1,273	18.2	−9.3
Green	G. Rainford	371	5.3	+1.8
Communist	I. Dixon	66	0.9	+0.0
Majority		1,347	19.3	−9.9
Turnout		6,997		
Labour hold		Swing	-13.1	

Horsforth
Party	Candidate	Votes	%	±%
Alliance (Liberal)	J. Cummins	3,704	46.2	−2.8
Conservative	S. Whitehead	3,112	38.8	−3.1
Labour	F. Hamilton	1,210	15.1	+5.8
Majority		592	7.4	+0.3
Turnout		8,026		
Alliance hold		Swing	+0.1	

Hunslet
Party	Candidate	Votes	%	±%
Labour	John Gunnell	2,423	76.3	−6.5
Alliance (Liberal)	D. Hollingsworth	365	11.5	+2.4
Conservative	H. Lavery	331	10.4	+2.3
National Front	H. Hilton	58	1.8	+1.8
Majority		2,058	64.8	−9.0
Turnout		3,177		
Labour hold		Swing	-4.4	

Kirkstall
Party	Candidate	Votes	%	±%
Labour	Bernard Atha	3,450	57.0	+2.0
Alliance (Liberal)	N. Batterham	1,536	25.4	+4.1
Conservative	S. Morris	1,071	17.7	−5.1
Majority		1,914	31.6	−0.6
Turnout		6,057		
Labour hold		Swing	-1.0	

Middleton
Party	Candidate	Votes	%	±%
Labour	L. Middleton	3,112	72.4	−2.4
Conservative	A. Larvin	630	14.7	−0.9
Alliance (SDP)	S. Cohen	522	12.2	+2.5
Revolutionary Communist	R. Matthews	32	0.7	+0.7
Majority		2,482	57.8	−1.5
Turnout		4,296		
Labour hold		Swing	-0.7	

Moortown
Party	Candidate	Votes	%	±%
Alliance (Liberal)	W. Winlow	3,987	50.9	+5.9
Conservative	S. Symmonds	2,562	32.7	−7.1
Labour	M. Stinson	1,277	16.3	+1.2
Majority		1,425	18.2	+13.0
Turnout		7,826		
Alliance gain from Conservative		Swing	+6.5	

Morley North
Party	Candidate	Votes	%	±%
Labour	P. Fitzpatrick	3,126	44.2	−6.9
Conservative	R. Verity	2,650	37.5	−3.8
Alliance (SDP)	P. Haywood	1,300	18.4	+10.7
Majority		476	6.7	−3.1
Turnout		7,076		
Labour gain from Conservative		Swing	-1.5	

Morley South
Party	Candidate	Votes	%	±%
Labour	K. Burnley	3,340	57.0	−3.9
Conservative	A. Grayson	1,577	26.9	−0.6
Alliance (SDP)	H. Smith	945	16.1	+4.5
Majority		1,763	30.1	−3.3
Turnout		5,862		
Labour hold		Swing	-1.6	

North
Party	Candidate	Votes	%	±%
Conservative	K. Sibbald	3,327	47.3	−4.3
Alliance (SDP)	D. Midgley	2,605	37.0	+9.3
Labour	B. Selby	1,107	15.7	−5.0
Majority		722	10.3	−13.6
Turnout		7,039		
Conservative hold		Swing	-6.8	

Otley & Wharfedale
Party	Candidate	Votes	%	±%
Alliance (Liberal)	C. Campbell	4,062	42.8	+1.7
Conservative	G. Francis	3,615	38.0	−5.6
Labour	M. Attwood	1,531	16.1	+2.3
Green	A. Stevens	293	3.1	+1.6
Majority		447	4.7	+2.2
Turnout		9,501		
Alliance hold		Swing	+3.6	

Pudsey North
Party	Candidate	Votes	%	±%
Conservative	J. Bashall	3,175	39.0	−12.1
Labour	J. McKenna	2,585	31.7	−5.3
Alliance (Liberal)	C. Garner	2,383	29.3	+17.4
Majority		590	7.2	−6.9
Turnout		8,143		
Conservative hold		Swing	-3.4	

Pudsey South
Party	Candidate	Votes	%	±%
Labour	R. Lewis	3,051	43.1	+11.7
Conservative	J. Mortimer	2,217	31.3	+10.1
Alliance (SDP)	P. Garbutt	1,808	25.6	+14.9
Majority		834	11.8	+6.5
Turnout		7,076		
Labour gain from Conservative		Swing	+0.8	

Richmond Hill
Party	Candidate	Votes	%	±%
Labour	E. McGee	4,163	69.1	+12.9
Alliance (Liberal)	K. Norman	1,300	21.6	−16.6
Conservative	D. Boynton	492	8.2	+2.6
BNP	D. Owens	69	1.1	+1.1
Majority		2,863	47.5	+29.5
Turnout		6,024		
Labour gain from Alliance		Swing	+14.7	

Rothwell
Party	Candidate	Votes	%	±%
Labour	A. Hudson	3,756	65.0	−3.3
Conservative	B. Caro	1,181	20.4	−1.3
Alliance (SDP)	S. Browning	840	14.5	+4.6
Majority		2,575	44.6	−1.9
Turnout		5,777		
Labour hold		Swing	-1.0	

Roundhay
Party	Candidate	Votes	%	±%
Conservative	J. White	3,807	52.6	−8.4
Alliance (SDP)	C. Fieldhouse	2,162	29.9	+9.4
Labour	R. Darrington	1,271	17.6	−1.0
Majority		1,645	22.7	−17.8
Turnout		7,240		
Conservative hold		Swing	-8.9	

Seacroft
Party	Candidate	Votes	%	±%
Labour	A. Vollans	3,404	71.9	−0.2
Conservative	D. Townsley	707	14.9	−5.1
Alliance (SDP)	D. Parr	582	12.3	+4.4
Revolutionary Communist	E. McEvoy	44	0.9	+0.9
Majority		2,697	56.9	+4.9
Turnout		4,737		
Labour hold		Swing	+2.4	

University
Party	Candidate	Votes	%	±%
Labour	D. Jenner	3,258	70.7	+0.0
Alliance (SDP)	J. Clifton	704	15.3	+2.7
Conservative	A. Savage	527	11.4	−2.9
Communist	R. Honey	120	2.6	+0.2
Majority		2,554	55.4	−1.0
Turnout		4,609		
Labour hold		Swing	-1.3	

Weetwood
Party	Candidate	Votes	%	±%
Conservative	J. Hamilton	3,195	37.8	−3.3
Labour	J. Page	2,987	35.3	−3.0
Alliance (SDP)	K. Lee	2,079	24.6	+6.5
Green	C. Nash	197	2.3	−0.2
Majority		208	2.5	−0.2
Turnout		8,458		
Conservative hold		Swing	-0.1	

Wetherby
Party	Candidate	Votes	%	±%
Conservative	J. Gray	4,715	62.1	−8.2
Alliance (Liberal)	T. Burgess	1,875	24.7	+7.5
Labour	C. Dews	1,001	13.2	+0.7
Majority		2,840	37.4	−15.8
Turnout		7,591		
Conservative hold		Swing	-7.8	

Whinmoor
Party	Candidate	Votes	%	±%
Labour	G. Platt	3,002	53.8	+0.3
Conservative	M. Silversides	1,809	32.4	−2.9
Alliance (SDP)	G. Boustead	767	13.8	+2.7
Majority		1,193	21.4	+3.2
Turnout		5,578		
Labour hold		Swing	+1.6	

Wortley
Party	Candidate	Votes	%	±%
Labour	M. Bedford	3,223	46.2	+5.2
Alliance (Liberal)	L. Thackray	2,341	33.5	−1.7
Conservative	H. Connah	1,335	19.1	−4.6
Independent	L. Wilkinson	80	1.1	+1.1
Majority		882	12.6	+6.8
Turnout		6,979		
Labour hold		Swing	+3.4	

== By-elections between 1986 and 1987 ==
Aireborough by-election 18 August 1986 replacing T. Hawkins
Party	Candidate	Votes	%	±%
Alliance (Liberal)	Janet Brown	3,008	43.9	+10.6
Conservative	Barbara Widdop	2,095	30.6	−7.6
Labour	Mora Dunn	1,741	25.4	−3.1
Majority		913	13.3	+8.4
Turnout		6,844	35.2	−8.6
Alliance gain from Conservative		Swing	+9.1	
