= Moortown (ward) =

Electoral ward in Leeds, England

- Moortown highlighted within Leeds
- Population: 17,363 (2023 electorate)
- Metropolitan borough: City of Leeds
- Metropolitan county: West Yorkshire
- Region: Yorkshire and the Humber
- Country: England
- Sovereign state: United Kingdom
- UK Parliament: Leeds North East
- Councillors: Sharon Hamilton (Labour); Mohammed Shahzad (Labour); Laura Fisher (Labour)

Moortown is an electoral ward of Leeds City Council in north Leeds, West Yorkshire, covering the suburb of the same name, Meanwood and the southern part of Moor Allerton below the Leeds Outer Ring Road.

== Councillors since 1973 ==
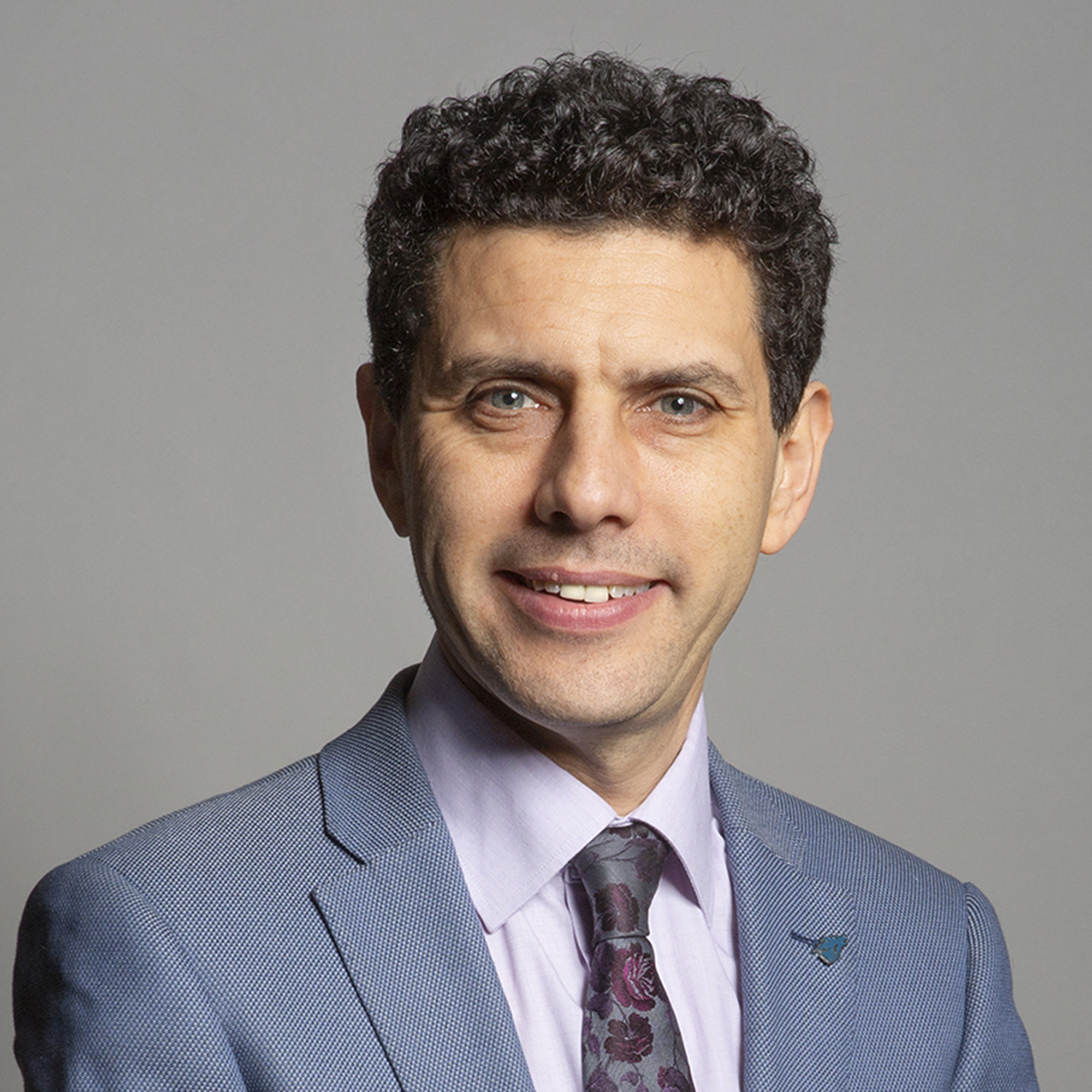
Alex Sobel represented Moortown ward (2012-2018). Member of Parliament for Leeds North West since 2017.

Election	Councillor	Councillor	Councillor
1973	A.D. Redmond (Con) (Note: Redmond had represented the ward since 1968.)	M. Davies (Con) (Note: Davies had represented the ward since 1968.)	R. Challenor (Con) (Note: Challenor had represented the ward since 1968.)
1975	A.D. Redmond (Con)	M. Davies (Con)	R. Challenor (Con)
1976	A.D. Redmond (Con)	K. Sibbald (Con)	R. Challenor (Con)
1978	A.D. Redmond (Con)	K. Sibbald (Con)	R. Challenor (Con)
1979	A.D. Redmond (Con) (Note: Redmond stood for the newly created North ward at the next election in 1980.)	K. Sibbald (Con) (Note: Sibbald stood for the newly created North ward at the next election in 1980.)	R. Challenor (Con)
1980	Christine Thomas (Con) (Note: Thomas had represented Burmantofts ward from 1968 and Chapel Allerton and Scott Hall ward since 1973.)	Peter Sparling (Con) (Note: Sparling had represented Chapel Allerton ward from 1971 and then Chapel Allerton and Scott Hall ward since 1973.)	Sydney Symmonds (Con) (Note: Symmonds had previously represented Potternewton ward from 1955 to 1968, Chapel Allerton ward from 1968 to 1969 and then Chapel Allerton and Scott Hall ward from 1973 until 1980.)
1982	Christine Thomas (Con)	Peter Sparling (Con)	Sydney Symmonds (Con)
1983	Christine Thomas (Con)	Peter Sparling (Con)	Sydney Symmonds (Con)
1984	Mark Harris (SDP)	Peter Sparling (Con)	Sydney Symmonds (Con)
1986	Mark Harris (SDP)	Peter Sparling (Con)	Bill Winlow (Lib)
1987	Mark Harris (SDP)	Miles Crompton (SDP)	Bill Winlow (Lib)
1988	Mark Harris (SLD)	Miles Crompton (SLD)	Bill Winlow (SLD)
1990	Mark Harris (LD)	Miles Crompton (LD)	Bill Winlow (LD)
1991	Mark Harris (LD)	Miles Crompton (LD)	Bill Winlow (LD)
1992	Mark Harris (LD)	Miles Crompton (LD)	Bill Winlow (LD)
1994	Mark Harris (LD)	Miles Crompton (LD)	Bill Winlow (LD)
1995	Mark Harris (LD)	Christine Brett (LD)	Bill Winlow (LD)
1996	Mark Harris (LD)	Christine Brett (LD)	Bill Winlow (LD)
1998	Mark Harris (LD)	Christine Brett (LD)	Bill Winlow (LD) (Note: Winlow retired from council at the next election in 1999. He later became a Lancashire County Councillor from 2009 to 2017.)
1999	Mark Harris (LD)	Christine Brett (LD)	Brenda Lancaster (LD)
2000	Mark Harris (LD)	Christine Brett (LD)	Brenda Lancaster (LD)
2001 by-election	Mark Harris (LD)	Richard Harker (LD)	Brenda Lancaster (LD)
2002	Mark Harris (LD)	Richard Harker (LD)	Brenda Lancaster (LD)
2003	Mark Harris (LD)	Richard Harker (LD)	Brenda Lancaster (LD)
2004	Mark Harris (LD)	Richard Harker (LD)	Brenda Lancaster (LD)
2006	Mark Harris (LD)	Richard Harker (LD)	Brenda Lancaster (LD)
2007	Mark Harris (LD)	Richard Harker (LD)	Brenda Lancaster (LD)
2008	Mark Harris (LD)	Richard Harker (LD)	Brenda Lancaster (LD)
2010	Mark Harris (LD)	Sharon Hamilton (Lab) (Note: Hamilton previously served as a councillor for Chapel Allerton from 2004 to 2008, then being selected as the Labour candidate for Roundhay ward ahead of the 2008 election but lost to the Conservative incumbent, Matthew Lobley.)	Brenda Lancaster (LD)
2011	Mark Harris (LD)	Sharon Hamilton (Lab)	Rebecca Charlwood (Lab)
2012	Alex Sobel (Lab)	Sharon Hamilton (Lab)	Rebecca Charlwood (Lab)
2014	Alex Sobel (Lab)	Sharon Hamilton (Lab)	Rebecca Charlwood (Lab)
2015	Alex Sobel (Lab)	Sharon Hamilton (Lab)	Rebecca Charlwood (Lab)
2016	Alex Sobel (Lab) (Note: Sobel was elected as Member of Parliament for Leeds North West at the 2017 general election and retired from council at the 2018 council election.)	Sharon Hamilton (Lab)	Rebecca Charlwood (Lab)
2018	Mohammed Shahzad (Lab)	Sharon Hamilton (Lab)	Rebecca Charlwood (Lab)
2019	Mohammed Shahzad (Lab)	Sharon Hamilton (Lab)	Rebecca Charlwood (Lab)
2021	Mohammed Shahzad (Lab)	Sharon Hamilton (Lab)	Rebecca Charlwood (Lab)
2022	Mohammed Shahzad (Lab)	Sharon Hamilton (Lab)	Mahalia France-Mir (Lab)
2023	Mohammed Shahzad (Lab)	Sharon Hamilton (Lab)	Mahalia France-Mir (Lab)
2024	Mohammed Shahzad (Lab)	Sharon Hamilton (Lab)	Mahalia France-Mir (Lab)
January 2026	Mohammed Shahzad (Lab)	Sharon Hamilton (Lab)	Vacant (Note: Position vacant following the death of Cllr Mahalia France-Mir on 20 January 2026.)
2026	Mohammed Shahzad* (Lab)	Sharon Hamilton* (Lab)	Laura Fisher* (Lab)

indicates seat up for re-election. indicates seat up for election following resignation or death of sitting councillor. * indicates incumbent councillor.

== Elections since 2010 ==
=== May 2026 ===
2026
Party	Candidate	Votes	%	±%
Labour	Laura Fisher	2,758	32.9	−20.6
Green	Rachel Hartshorne	2,447	29.2	+11.2
Liberal Democrats	Sharon Slinger	1,277	15.2	+5.8
Reform	Sajjad Raja	1,011	12.1	New
Conservative	Rob Speed	838	10.0	−3.8
SDP	Sarah Welbourne	43	0.5	±0.0
Majority		311	3.7	−31.8
Turnout		8,374	49.1	+6.8
Labour hold		Swing		

=== May 2024 ===
2024
Party	Candidate	Votes	%	±%
Labour Co-op	Sharon Hamilton*	3,849	53.5	−4.0
Green	Rachel Hartshorne	1,298	18.0	+5.0
Conservative	Lee Farmer	992	13.8	−3.9
Liberal Democrats	Darren Finlay	678	9.4	+1.3
Yorkshire	David Stephens	344	4.8	+1.5
SDP	Cordelia Lynan	39	0.5	New
Majority		2,551	35.5	−3.9
Turnout		7,266	42.3	+2.9
Labour hold		Swing	-4.5	

=== May 2023 ===
2023
Party	Candidate	Votes	%	±%
Labour Co-op	Mohammed Shahzad*	3,938	57.5	+0.9
Conservative	Lee Farmer	1,210	17.7	−1.3
Green	Rachel Hartshorne	892	13.0	−2.2
Liberal Democrats	George Sykes	557	8.1	−1.5
Yorkshire	David Stephens	226	3.3	N/A
Majority		2,728	39.8	+3.2
Turnout		6,848	39.4	−1.7
Labour hold		Swing		

=== May 2022 ===
2022
Party	Candidate	Votes	%	±%
Labour	Mahalia France-Mir	3,980	55.6	+2.4
Conservative	Rob Speed	1,357	19.0	−4.5
Green	Rachel Hartshorne	1,086	15.2	+1.2
Liberal Democrats	George Sykes	690	9.6	+3.3
Majority		2,623	36.6	+5.9
Turnout		7,157	41.1	−5.0
Labour hold		Swing		

=== May 2021 ===
2021
Party	Candidate	Votes	%	±%
Labour Co-op	Sharon Hamilton*	4,375	54.2	+6.0
Conservative	Rob Speed	1,900	23.5	+4.6
Green	Rachel Hartshorne	1,133	14.0	−2.5
Liberal Democrats	David Dresser	511	6.3	−10.0
SDP	Steve Wright	74	0.1	N/A
Majority		2,475	30.7	−1.4
Turnout		8,070	46.1	+10.08
Labour hold		Swing		

=== May 2019 ===
2019
Party	Candidate	Votes	%	±%
Labour	Mohammed Shahzad*	2,940	48.2	−1.2
Conservative	Rob Speed	1,154	18.9	−1.1
Green	Rachel Hartshorne	1,008	16.5	+2.7
Liberal Democrats	David Dresser	994	16.3	+1.3
Majority		1,786	29.3	−4.4
Turnout		6,174	36.02	−7.28
Labour hold		Swing	-0.1	

=== May 2018 ===
2018
Party	Candidate	Votes	%	±%
Labour	Rebecca Charlwood*	4,248	49.4	−4.6
Labour	Sharon Hamilton*	3,730		
Labour	Mohammed Shahzad	3,527		
Conservative	Ross Cunliffe	1,719	20.0	−0.5
Conservative	Rob Speed	1,643		
Conservative	Liam Pearce	1,527		
Liberal Democrats	Ian Dowling	1,287	15.0	+4.5
Green	Gavin Andrews	1,188	13.8	+7.1
Liberal Democrats	David Dresser	996		
Liberal Democrats	Chris Howley	874		
UKIP	Ian Greenberg	155	1.8	−6.5
UKIP	Jeff Miles	134		
Majority		2,529	33.7	+0.7
Turnout		7,513	43.3	+4.6
Labour hold		Swing		
Labour hold		Swing		
Labour hold		Swing		

=== May 2016 ===
2016
Party	Candidate	Votes	%	±%
Labour Co-op	Alex Sobel*	3,517	53.5	+8.8
Conservative	Mark Dodsworth	1,349	20.5	−7.4
Liberal Democrats	Chris Howley	692	10.5	+0.6
UKIP	Harvey C Alexander	565	8.3	+0.4
Green	Tim Goodall	455	6.7	+1.2
Majority		2,168	33.0	+16.2
Turnout		6,578	38.7	
Labour hold		Swing		

=== May 2015 ===
2015
Party	Candidate	Votes	%	±%
Labour	Rebecca Charlwood*	5,572	44.7	+0.2
Conservative	Mark Dodsworth	3,476	27.9	+11.2
Liberal Democrats	Darren Finlay	1,232	9.9	−24.3
UKIP	Ian Laidlaw	989	7.9	+7.9
Green	Benjamin Hinchliffe	979	7.9	+7.9
Alliance for Green Socialism	Ros Campbell	208	1.7	−2.9
Majority		2,096	16.8	+6.5
Turnout		12,456	70.9	
Labour hold		Swing	-5.5	

=== May 2014 ===
2014
Party	Candidate	Votes	%	±%
Labour	Sharon Hamilton*	2,923		
Conservative	Mark Dodsworth	1,282		
UKIP	Alan Procter	821		
Green	Christopher Smith	806		
Liberal Democrats	Darren Finlay	781		
Alliance for Green Socialism	Ros Campbell	188		
Majority		1,641		
Turnout			39.87	
Labour hold		Swing		

=== May 2012 ===
2012
Party	Candidate	Votes	%	±%
Labour Co-op	Alex Sobel	3,045	44.6	+0.0
Liberal Democrats	Mark Harris	2,265	33.1	−1.1
Conservative	Mark Rowlinson	804	11.8	−4.9
UKIP	Jeff Miles	430	6.3	+6.3
Alliance for Green Socialism	Allan House	290	4.2	−0.4
Majority		780	11.4	+1.1
Turnout		6,834		
Labour gain from Liberal Democrats		Swing	+0.5	

=== May 2011 ===
2011
Party	Candidate	Votes	%	±%
Labour	Rebecca Charlwood	3,688	44.5	+9.3
Liberal Democrats	Brenda Lancaster	2,834	34.2	−0.1
Conservative	Mark Rowlinson	1,380	16.7	−8.7
Alliance for Green Socialism	Allan House	381	4.6	+2.2
Majority		854	10.3	+9.4
Turnout		8,283	48	
Labour gain from Liberal Democrats		Swing	+4.7	

=== May 2010 ===
2010
Party	Candidate	Votes	%	±%
Labour	Sharon Hamilton	4,362	35.3	+9.5
Liberal Democrats	Richard Harker	4,247	34.3	−7.0
Conservative	Dan Cohen	3,133	25.3	+1.9
BNP	Leslie Howells	327	2.6	−1.3
Alliance for Green Socialism	Michael Davies	301	2.4	−1.1
Majority		115	0.9	−14.6
Turnout		12,370	72.3	+32.7
Labour gain from Liberal Democrats		Swing	+8.2	

== See also ==
- Listed buildings in Leeds (Moortown Ward)
