= 1983 Leeds City Council election =

1983 UK local government election

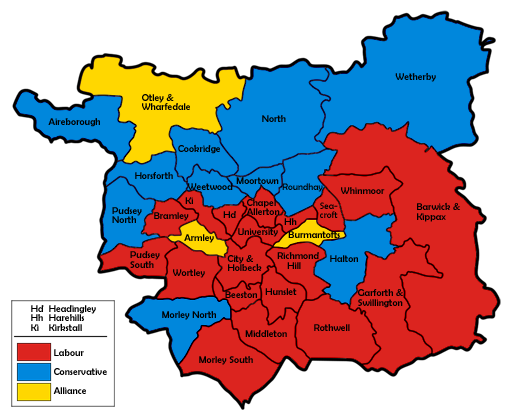
Map of the results for the 1983 Leeds council election.

Elections to Leeds City Council were held on Thursday, 5 May 1983, with one third of the council to be elected.

The unwinding of much of Alliance's momentum helped Labour defend most of their 1982 losses, with the Conservative and Alliance gains restricted to a seat apiece in Morley North and Burmantofts respectively. The Conservative ousted by the Alliance gain in ultra-marginal Horsforth the year before won his way back onto the council with the only other gain of the night.

== Election result ==
Leeds local election result 1983
Party	Seats	Gains	Losses	Net gain/loss	Seats %	Votes %	Votes	+/−
Labour	19	0	2	-2	57.6	40.1	90,584	+5.7%
Conservative	11	2	0	+2	33.3	36.3	81,908	+0.5%
Alliance	3	1	1	0	9.1	23.0	51,880	-6.4%
Independent	0	0	0	0	0.0	0.2	539	+0.2%
Communist	0	0	0	0	0.0	0.2	468	-0.0%
Ecology	0	0	0	0	0.0	0.1	227	-0.0%
National Front	0	0	0	0	0.0	0.1	142	+0.1%

This result has the following consequences for the total number of seats on the council after the elections:

Party	Previous council	New council
Labour	56	54
Conservatives	32	34
Alliance	11	11
Total	99	99
Working majority	13	9

== Ward results ==
Aireborough
Party	Candidate	Votes	%	±%
Conservative	H. Barber	3,958	43.2	+1.0
Alliance (Liberal)	M. Cooksey	2,678	29.2	−7.4
Labour	P. Booth	2,532	27.6	+6.3
Majority		1,280	14.0	+8.4
Turnout		9,168		
Conservative hold		Swing	+4.2	

Armley
Party	Candidate	Votes	%	±%
Alliance (Liberal)	D. Selby	2,989	45.8	−0.7
Labour	B. Ewart	2,143	32.8	+3.4
Conservative	H. Hinchliffe	1,349	20.7	−2.5
Communist	J. Hodgson	46	0.7	−0.3
Majority		846	13.0	−4.1
Turnout		6,527		
Alliance hold		Swing	-2.0	

Barwick & Kippax
Party	Candidate	Votes	%	±%
Labour	M. Monks	3,652	49.5	+10.1
Conservative	W. Hedley	2,937	39.8	−2.9
Alliance (SDP)	E. Ayres	792	10.7	−7.2
Majority		715	9.7	+6.4
Turnout		7,381		
Labour hold		Swing	+6.5	

Beeston
Party	Candidate	Votes	%	±%
Labour	H. Booth	2,937	54.3	+8.0
Conservative	W. Birch	1,755	32.5	+0.5
Alliance (SDP)	B. Pollard	712	13.2	−8.5
Majority		1,182	21.9	+7.5
Turnout		5,404		
Labour hold		Swing	+3.7	

Bramley
Party	Candidate	Votes	%	±%
Labour	A. Miller	3,343	51.7	+6.1
Alliance (Liberal)	R. Barker	2,012	31.1	−5.0
Conservative	G. Broadbent	1,114	17.2	−1.2
Majority		1,331	20.6	+11.2
Turnout		6,469		
Labour hold		Swing	+5.5	

Burmantofts
Party	Candidate	Votes	%	±%
Alliance (Liberal)	T. Bland	3,174	45.6	−7.5
Labour	S. Armitage	2,954	42.5	+7.4
Conservative	S. Temple	715	10.3	−0.7
National Front	P. Vessey	59	0.8	+0.8
Communist	M. Monkman	56	0.8	−0.1
Majority		220	3.2	−14.9
Turnout		6,958		
Alliance gain from Labour		Swing	-7.4	

Chapel Allerton
Party	Candidate	Votes	%	±%
Labour	C. Clarke	4,049	60.1	+4.6
Conservative	J. Moore	1,809	26.9	−0.2
Alliance (Liberal)	C. Smith	879	13.0	−4.4
Majority		2,240	33.2	+4.7
Turnout		6,737		
Labour hold		Swing	+2.4	

City & Holbeck
Party	Candidate	Votes	%	±%
Labour	E. Morris	3,705	64.4	+2.7
Alliance (Liberal)	A. Paton	1,177	20.5	−2.0
Conservative	D. Tomlinson	872	15.2	−0.7
Majority		2,528	43.9	+4.7
Turnout		5,754		
Labour hold		Swing	+2.3	

Cookridge
Party	Candidate	Votes	%	±%
Conservative	A. Wheatley	4,141	55.9	+0.0
Alliance (Liberal)	P. Kelley	1,900	25.7	−5.4
Labour	F. Davis	1,362	18.4	+5.4
Majority		2,241	30.3	+5.5
Turnout		7,403		
Conservative hold		Swing	+2.7	

Garforth & Swillington
Party	Candidate	Votes	%	±%
Labour	D. Lambert	3,673	44.1	+9.5
Conservative	N. May	3,562	42.8	+2.2
Alliance (SDP)	P. Wilson	1,095	13.1	−11.7
Majority		111	1.3	−4.6
Turnout		8,330		
Labour hold		Swing	+3.6	

Halton
Party	Candidate	Votes	%	±%
Conservative	W. Hyde	4,025	59.2	+3.4
Labour	W. Prichard	1,700	25.0	+7.0
Alliance (SDP)	J. Ratcliffe	1,069	15.7	−10.4
Majority		2,325	34.2	+4.5
Turnout		6,794		
Conservative hold		Swing	-1.8	

Harehills
Party	Candidate	Votes	%	±%
Labour	M. Simmons	3,924	65.1	+4.9
Conservative	C. Robins	1,374	22.8	−2.7
Alliance (Liberal)	N. Foster	732	12.1	−2.2
Majority		2,550	42.3	+7.6
Turnout		6,030		
Labour hold		Swing	+3.8	

Headingley
Party	Candidate	Votes	%	±%
Labour	J. Thomas	3,646	53.6	+7.8
Conservative	D. Flowers	2,190	32.2	+1.6
Alliance (SDP)	C. Mularczyk	824	12.1	−9.2
Communist	B. Cooper	140	2.1	−0.3
Majority		1,456	21.4	+6.2
Turnout		6,800		
Labour hold		Swing	+3.1	

Horsforth
Party	Candidate	Votes	%	±%
Conservative	V. Stevens	3,875	45.8	+2.0
Alliance (Liberal)	M. Crossfield	3,720	44.0	−1.6
Labour	A. Radford	858	10.2	−0.4
Majority		155	1.8	+0.0
Turnout		8,453		
Conservative gain from Alliance		Swing	+1.8	

Hunslet
Party	Candidate	Votes	%	±%
Labour	John Battle	3,520	83.5	+9.9
Conservative	R. Wilkinson	405	9.6	+0.4
Alliance (SDP)	D. Midgley	289	6.9	−10.3
Majority		3,115	73.9	+17.4
Turnout		4,214		
Labour hold		Swing	+4.7	

Kirkstall
Party	Candidate	Votes	%	±%
Labour	J. Illingworth	3,727	56.2	+0.5
Conservative	A. Walkington	1,808	27.3	−2.4
Alliance (Liberal)	P. Meadowcroft	1,014	15.3	+2.2
Communist	B. Jackson	78	1.2	−0.2
Majority		1,919	29.0	+2.9
Turnout		6,627		
Labour hold		Swing	+1.4	

Middleton
Party	Candidate	Votes	%	±%
Labour	J. Taylor	3,303	73.7	+9.7
Conservative	A. Larvin	765	17.1	−0.4
Alliance (Liberal)	L. Thackray	411	9.2	−9.4
Majority		2,538	56.7	+11.2
Turnout		4,479		
Labour hold		Swing	+5.0	

Moortown
Party	Candidate	Votes	%	±%
Conservative	P. Sparling	3,739	47.9	−1.6
Alliance (SDP)	M. Harris	2,712	34.7	−1.4
Labour	G. Ford	1,363	17.4	+2.9
Majority		1,027	13.1	−0.3
Turnout		7,814		
Conservative hold		Swing	-0.1	

Morley North
Party	Candidate	Votes	%	±%
Conservative	G. Marshall	3,522	46.5	+5.3
Labour	R. Cordingley	3,168	41.8	+6.9
Alliance (SDP)	H. Smith	886	11.7	−12.2
Majority		354	4.7	−1.5
Turnout		7,576		
Conservative gain from Labour		Swing	-0.8	

Morley South
Party	Candidate	Votes	%	±%
Labour	R. Mitchell	3,426	50.2	−1.0
Conservative	R. Halpin	2,189	32.0	+7.7
Alliance (SDP)	S. Beagles	677	9.9	−14.6
Independent	S. Welham	539	7.9	+7.9
Majority		1,237	18.1	−8.6
Turnout		6,831		
Labour hold		Swing	-4.3	

North
Party	Candidate	Votes	%	±%
Conservative	R. Feldman	4,011	61.5	+4.0
Alliance (SDP)	M. Lance	1,415	21.7	−9.0
Labour	R. Davey	1,101	16.9	+5.0
Majority		2,596	39.8	+13.0
Turnout		6,527		
Conservative hold		Swing	+6.5	

Otley & Wharfedale
Party	Candidate	Votes	%	±%
Alliance (Liberal)	G. Kirkland	5,196	51.3	+3.8
Conservative	E. Davies	3,844	37.9	−2.6
Labour	J. Monksfield	869	8.6	−0.3
Ecology	A. Laurence	227	2.2	−0.9
Majority		1,352	13.3	+6.4
Turnout		10,136		
Alliance hold		Swing	+3.2	

Pudsey North
Party	Candidate	Votes	%	±%
Conservative	I. Favell	4,031	50.1	+5.5
Labour	F. Burnley	2,444	30.4	+2.2
Alliance (SDP)	V. Hudson	1,569	19.5	−7.7
Majority		1,587	19.7	+3.3
Turnout		8,044		
Conservative hold		Swing	+1.6	

Pudsey South
Party	Candidate	Votes	%	±%
Labour	A. Dickinson	2,688	39.4	+5.5
Conservative	P. Lee	2,500	36.6	+2.1
Alliance (Liberal)	A. Booker	1,637	24.0	−7.5
Majority		188	2.8	+2.2
Turnout		6,825		
Labour hold		Swing	+1.7	

Richmond Hill
Party	Candidate	Votes	%	±%
Labour	D. Hamilton	3,636	50.3	+14.2
Alliance (Liberal)	K. Norman	2,973	41.1	−14.1
Conservative	J. Higham	534	7.4	−1.2
National Front	H. Hilton	83	1.1	+1.1
Majority		663	9.2	−10.0
Turnout		7,226		
Labour hold		Swing	+14.1	

Rothwell
Party	Candidate	Votes	%	±%
Labour	B. Walker	3,609	59.0	+10.6
Conservative	D. Boynton	1,667	27.3	+1.7
Alliance (SDP)	P. Burton	790	12.9	−12.1
Communist	R. Horsbrough	50	0.8	−0.1
Majority		1,942	31.8	+9.0
Turnout		6,116		
Labour hold		Swing	+4.4	

Roundhay
Party	Candidate	Votes	%	±%
Conservative	P. Gruen	4,582	63.5	+3.4
Alliance (Liberal)	S. Holland	1,449	20.1	−6.5
Labour	C. Samuels	1,189	16.5	+3.1
Majority		3,133	43.4	+9.9
Turnout		7,220		
Labour hold		Swing	+4.9	

Seacroft
Party	Candidate	Votes	%	±%
Labour	D. Gabb	3,408	67.9	+5.1
Conservative	P. Hyde	1,052	21.0	+2.1
Alliance (SDP)	T. Ayres	559	11.1	−7.2
Majority		2,356	46.9	+2.9
Turnout		5,019		
Labour hold		Swing	+1.5	

University
Party	Candidate	Votes	%	±%
Labour	N. Sloane	3,233	66.0	+3.1
Conservative	J. Mindell	904	18.5	+2.3
Alliance (Liberal)	J. Staines	664	13.6	−5.4
Communist	J. Rodgers	98	2.0	+0.0
Majority		2,329	47.5	+3.6
Turnout		4,899		
Labour hold		Swing	+0.4	

Weetwood
Party	Candidate	Votes	%	±%
Conservative	S. Gill	3,369	45.9	−0.3
Labour	I. Steele	2,526	34.5	+9.5
Alliance (SDP)	G. Fox	1,437	19.6	−9.3
Majority		843	11.5	−5.9
Turnout		7,332		
Conservative hold		Swing	-4.9	

Wetherby
Party	Candidate	Votes	%	±%
Conservative	D. Hudson	4,977	68.8	−0.1
Alliance (Liberal)	T. Burgess	1,480	20.5	−1.5
Labour	R. Bishop	777	10.7	+1.6
Majority		3,497	48.3	+1.3
Turnout		7,234		
Conservative hold		Swing	+0.7	

Whinmoor
Party	Candidate	Votes	%	±%
Labour	R. Blower	2,807	48.4	+8.2
Conservative	M. Beardsall	2,135	36.8	+2.3
Alliance (SDP)	D. Mortimer	860	14.8	−10.5
Majority		672	11.6	+5.9
Turnout		5,802		
Labour hold		Swing	+2.9	

Wortley
Party	Candidate	Votes	%	±%
Labour	P. Fathers	3,312	43.5	+6.5
Conservative	H. Connah	2,198	28.8	−2.1
Alliance (Liberal)	A. Gilchrist	2,109	27.7	−4.4
Majority		1,114	14.6	+9.7
Turnout		7,619		
Labour hold		Swing	+4.3	
