= 1955 Leeds City Council election =

1955 UK local government election

The 1955 Leeds municipal elections were held on Thursday 12 May 1955, with one third of the council up for election, as well as a vacancy in Wellington.

With the third consecutive election producing swings to them - this time a 2.1% swing - the Conservatives managed to top the poll and make gains from Labour for the first time since the 1951 election, echoing their national result. This, however, did not stop Labour winning a comfortable majority of the seats contested. The three gains were in Beeston, Westfield and Wortley - wards where Labour had gained from them following 1951. Party totals remained unchanged with the new division of aldermen effectively wiping out those three gains, as Labour were allotted - at Conservative expense - three more aldermen. Turnout rose marginally to a low figure of 39.4%.

== Election result ==
Leeds local election result 1955
Party	Seats	Gains	Losses	Net gain/loss	Seats %	Votes %	Votes	+/−
Labour	17	0	3	-3	58.6	46.2	64,820	-3.7
Conservative	12	3	0	+3	41.4	51.9	72,863	+2.5
Liberal	0	0	0	0	0.0	1.5	2,043	+1.1
Communist	0	0	0	0	0.0	0.4	539	0.0

The result had the following consequences for the total number of seats on the council after the elections:

Party	Previous council		New council	
Party	Cllr	Ald	Cllr	Ald
Labour	54	14	51	17
Conservatives	30	14	33	11
Total	84	28	84	28
Total	112		112	
Working majority	24	0	18	6
Working majority	24		24	

== Ward results ==
Allerton
Party	Candidate	Votes	%	±%
Conservative	H. Drake	5,547	87.5	+0.9
Labour	M. Rooney	790	12.5	−0.9
Majority		4,757	75.1	+1.9
Turnout		6,337		
Conservative hold		Swing	+0.9	

Armley
Party	Candidate	Votes	%	±%
Labour	K. Cohen	2,970	54.4	−3.0
Conservative	R. Beal	2,126	38.9	−3.7
Liberal	A. Powell	367	6.7	+6.7
Majority		844	15.4	+0.6
Turnout		5,463		
Labour hold		Swing	+0.3	

Beeston
Party	Candidate	Votes	%	±%
Conservative	L. Snape	3,881	54.1	+1.1
Labour	H. Booth	3,299	45.9	−1.1
Majority		582	8.1	+2.1
Turnout		7,180		
Conservative gain from Labour		Swing	+1.1	

Blenheim
Party	Candidate	Votes	%	±%
Labour	J. Wallbanks	2,368	54.7	−3.1
Conservative	W. Murphy	1,958	45.3	+3.1
Majority		410	9.5	−6.2
Turnout		4,326		
Labour hold		Swing	-3.1	

Bramley
Party	Candidate	Votes	%	±%
Labour	Eric Atkinson	3,012	47.8	−5.6
Conservative	C. Dean	2,571	40.8	−5.7
Liberal	J. Walker	713	11.3	+11.3
Majority		441	7.0	+0.1
Turnout		6,296		
Labour hold		Swing	+0.0	

Burmantofts
Party	Candidate	Votes	%	±%
Labour	G. Lloyd	2,428	63.1	−3.3
Conservative	G. Howden	1,422	36.9	+3.3
Majority		1,006	26.1	−6.6
Turnout		3,850		
Labour hold		Swing	-3.3	

City
Party	Candidate	Votes	%	±%
Labour	E. Whitehead	1,638	62.0	−5.4
Conservative	J. Cape	1,005	38.0	+5.4
Majority		633	24.0	−10.7
Turnout		2,643		
Labour hold		Swing	-5.4	

Cross Gates
Party	Candidate	Votes	%	±%
Labour	F. Booth	3,262	57.7	−1.1
Conservative	J. Palmer	2,394	42.3	+1.1
Majority		868	15.3	−2.2
Turnout		5,656		
Labour hold		Swing	-1.1	

East Hunslet
Party	Candidate	Votes	%	±%
Labour	M. Fish	2,870	73.3	−3.5
Conservative	G. Hewdey	1,044	26.7	+3.5
Majority		1,826	46.7	−7.0
Turnout		3,914		
Labour hold		Swing	-3.5	

Far Headingley
Party	Candidate	Votes	%	±%
Conservative	W. Hey	4,665	83.5	−0.4
Labour	F. Woolhouse	922	16.5	+0.4
Majority		3,743	67.0	−0.7
Turnout		5,587		
Conservative hold		Swing	-0.4	

Halton
Party	Candidate	Votes	%	±%
Conservative	C. Watson	4,371	78.8	+2.7
Labour	J. Marshall	1,175	21.2	−2.7
Majority		3,196	57.6	+5.3
Turnout		5,546		
Conservative hold		Swing	+2.7	

Harehills
Party	Candidate	Votes	%	±%
Conservative	Lawrence Turnbull	3,515	59.7	+6.2
Labour	F. Howard	2,375	40.3	−6.2
Majority		1,140	19.4	+12.4
Turnout		5,890		
Conservative hold		Swing	+6.2	

Holbeck
Party	Candidate	Votes	%	±%
Labour	W. Jones	2,508	65.8	−2.8
Conservative	T. Nipe	1,302	34.2	+2.8
Majority		1,206	31.7	−5.5
Turnout		3,810		
Labour hold		Swing	-2.8	

Hunslet Carr
Party	Candidate	Votes	%	±%
Labour	J. Hodgkinson	2,662	73.6	−15.2
Conservative	J. Bailey	810	22.4	+22.4
Communist	J. Bellamy	144	4.0	−7.2
Majority		1,852	51.2	−26.5
Turnout		3,616		
Labour hold		Swing	-18.8	

Hyde Park
Party	Candidate	Votes	%	±%
Conservative	F. Walker	3,489	71.2	+2.8
Labour	M. Schofield	1,410	28.8	−2.8
Majority		2,079	42.4	+5.5
Turnout		4,899		
Conservative hold		Swing	+2.8	

Kirkstall
Party	Candidate	Votes	%	±%
Labour	Albert Smith	3,160	56.0	−5.1
Conservative	E. Lucas	2,480	44.0	+5.1
Majority		680	12.1	−10.2
Turnout		5,640		
Labour hold		Swing	-5.1	

Meanwood
Party	Candidate	Votes	%	±%
Conservative	V. Cardno	4,286	74.7	+4.6
Labour	J. Hedley	1,448	25.3	−4.6
Majority		2,838	49.2	+9.2
Turnout		5,734		
Conservative hold		Swing	+4.6	

Middleton
Party	Candidate	Votes	%	±%
Labour	Harold Watson	2,586	77.6	−3.6
Conservative	F. Stubley	747	22.4	+3.6
Majority		1,839	55.2	−7.2
Turnout		3,333		
Labour hold		Swing	-3.6	

Moortown
Party	Candidate	Votes	%	±%
Conservative	John Watson	4,733	76.8	+0.2
Labour	E. Norris	1,426	23.2	−0.2
Majority		3,307	53.7	+0.3
Turnout		6,159		
Conservative hold		Swing	+0.2	

Osmondthorpe
Party	Candidate	Votes	%	±%
Labour	G. Addlestone	2,809	71.8	−5.6
Conservative	L. Ideson	1,105	28.2	+5.6
Majority		1,704	43.5	−11.2
Turnout		3,914		
Labour hold		Swing	-5.6	

Potternewton
Party	Candidate	Votes	%	±%
Conservative	Sydney Symmonds	2,480	62.7	−2.0
Labour	F. Watson	1,307	33.0	−2.3
Communist	S. Bloom	170	4.3	+4.3
Majority		1,173	29.6	+0.2
Turnout		3,957		
Conservative hold		Swing	+0.1	

Richmond Hill
Party	Candidate	Votes	%	±%
Labour	A. King	2,202	78.9	−1.3
Conservative	W. Clayton	590	21.1	+1.3
Majority		1,612	57.7	−2.7
Turnout		2,792		
Labour hold		Swing	-1.3	

Roundhay
Party	Candidate	Votes	%	±%
Conservative	Allan Bretherick	4,782	71.8	+7.3
Labour	P. Taylor	1,877	28.2	−7.3
Majority		2,905	43.6	+14.6
Turnout		6,659		
Conservative hold		Swing	+7.3	

Stanningley
Party	Candidate	Votes	%	±%
Labour	R. Waterman	3,347	49.4	−0.9
Conservative	T. Kilby	2,832	41.8	−7.8
Liberal	E. Burbridge	592	8.7	+8.7
Majority		515	7.6	+6.9
Turnout		6,771		
Labour hold		Swing	+3.4	

Wellington
Party	Candidate	Votes	%	±%
Labour	N. Barrett	2,657	67.2	−4.4
Labour	E. Youngman	2,642		
Conservative	S. Rostron	699	17.7	−6.0
Conservative	F. Richardson	634		
Liberal	Walter Holdsworth	371	9.4	+9.4
Communist	J. Wheatley	225	5.7	+0.9
Majority		1,943	49.5	+1.6
Turnout		3,952		
Labour hold		Swing		
Labour hold		Swing	+0.8	

Westfield
Party	Candidate	Votes	%	±%
Conservative	L. Lyons	2,577	51.3	+13.0
Labour	A. Malcolm	2,442	48.7	−2.2
Majority		135	2.7	−9.8
Turnout		5,019		
Conservative gain from Labour		Swing	+7.6	

Woodhouse
Party	Candidate	Votes	%	±%
Labour	Henry Vick	2,729	56.9	−3.8
Conservative	L. Francis	2,066	43.1	+3.8
Majority		663	13.8	−7.7
Turnout		4,795		
Labour hold		Swing	-3.8	

Wortley
Party	Candidate	Votes	%	±%
Conservative	D. Wolstenholme	3,386	51.9	+1.4
Labour	Aimee Tong	3,141	48.1	−1.4
Majority		245	3.8	+2.8
Turnout		6,527		
Conservative gain from Labour		Swing	+1.4	
