= Lincoln Green =

Area in Leeds, West Yorkshire, England

Coordinates: 53.805°N 1.519°W

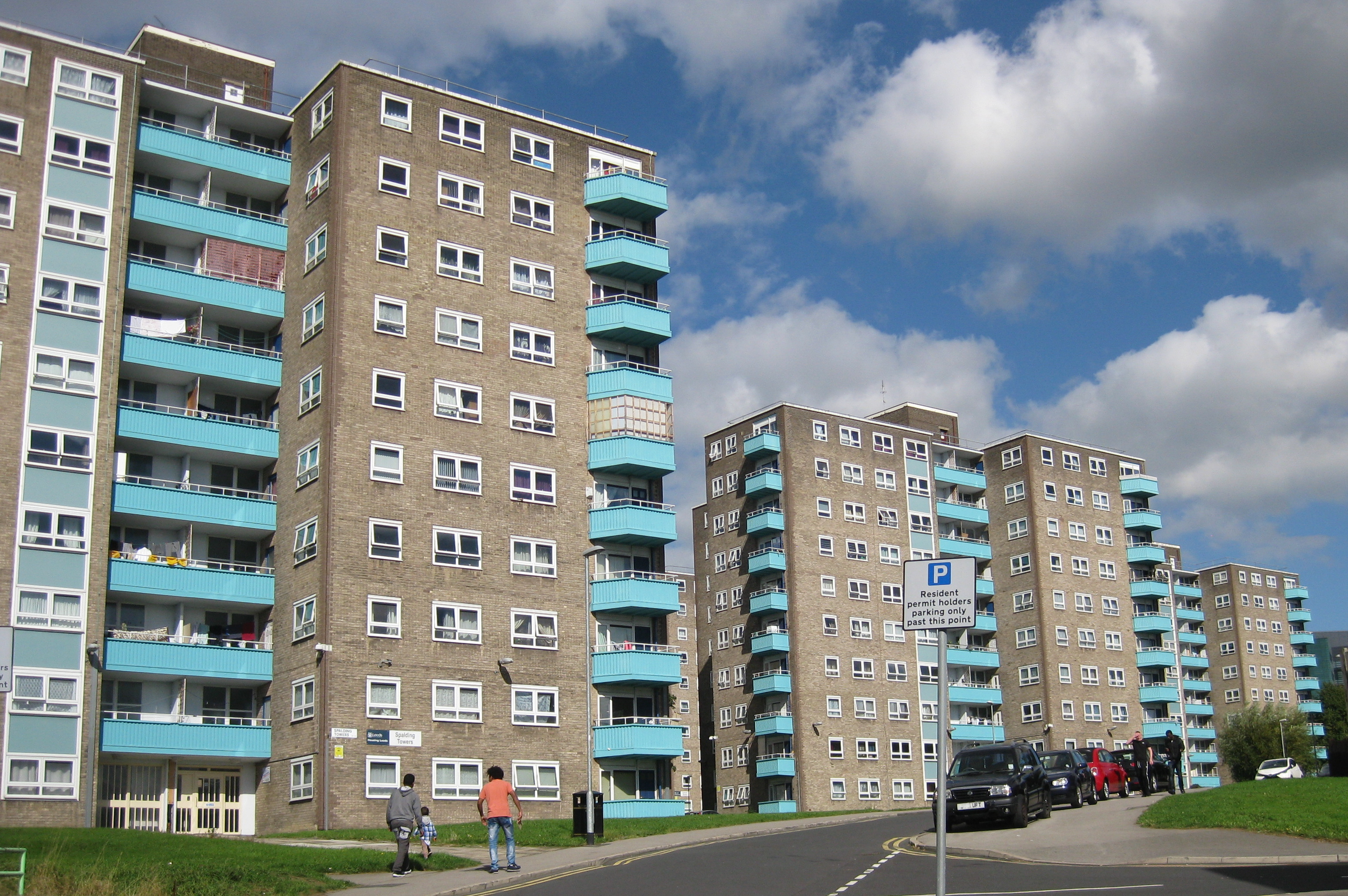
Towers on the Lincoln Green estate

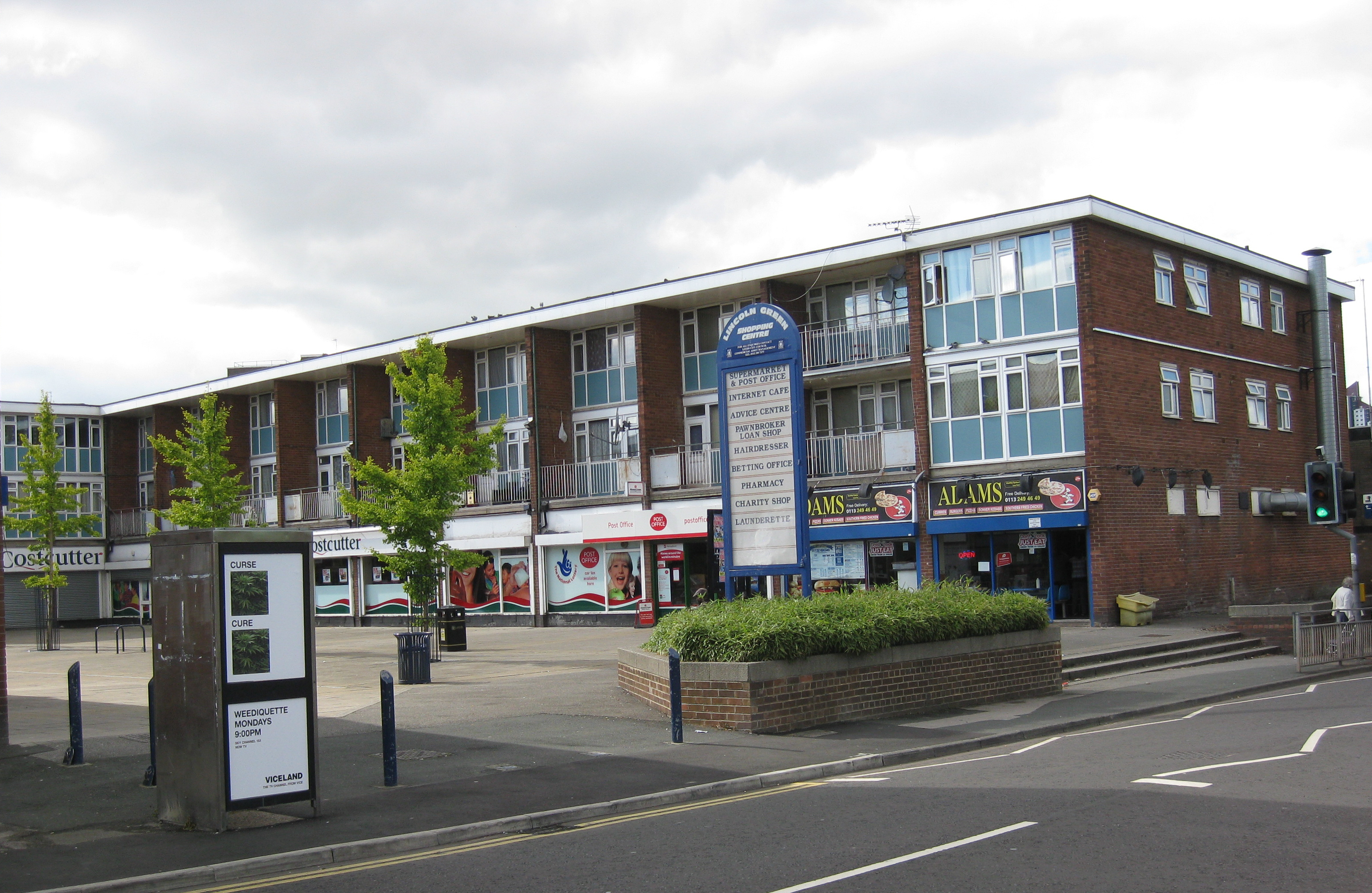
Lincoln Green Shopping Centre

Lincoln Green is a mainly residential area of Leeds, West Yorkshire, England around Lincoln Green Road, and is adjacent to and southwest of St James's University Hospital. It falls within the Burmantofts and Richmond Hill ward of the City of Leeds Council. The area was given this name in 1954, at the start of major redevelopment by the City Council.

The Lincoln Green estate on the north side of Lincoln Green Road is mainly tower blocks and low-rise flats, which replaced the terraced houses known as New Town in about 1958, following the 1950s slum clearances. On the south side of Lincoln Green Road is the Lincoln Green Shopping Centre, opened by celebrity Pat Phoenix (Elsie Tanner from Coronation Street) and community buildings and low-rise housing.

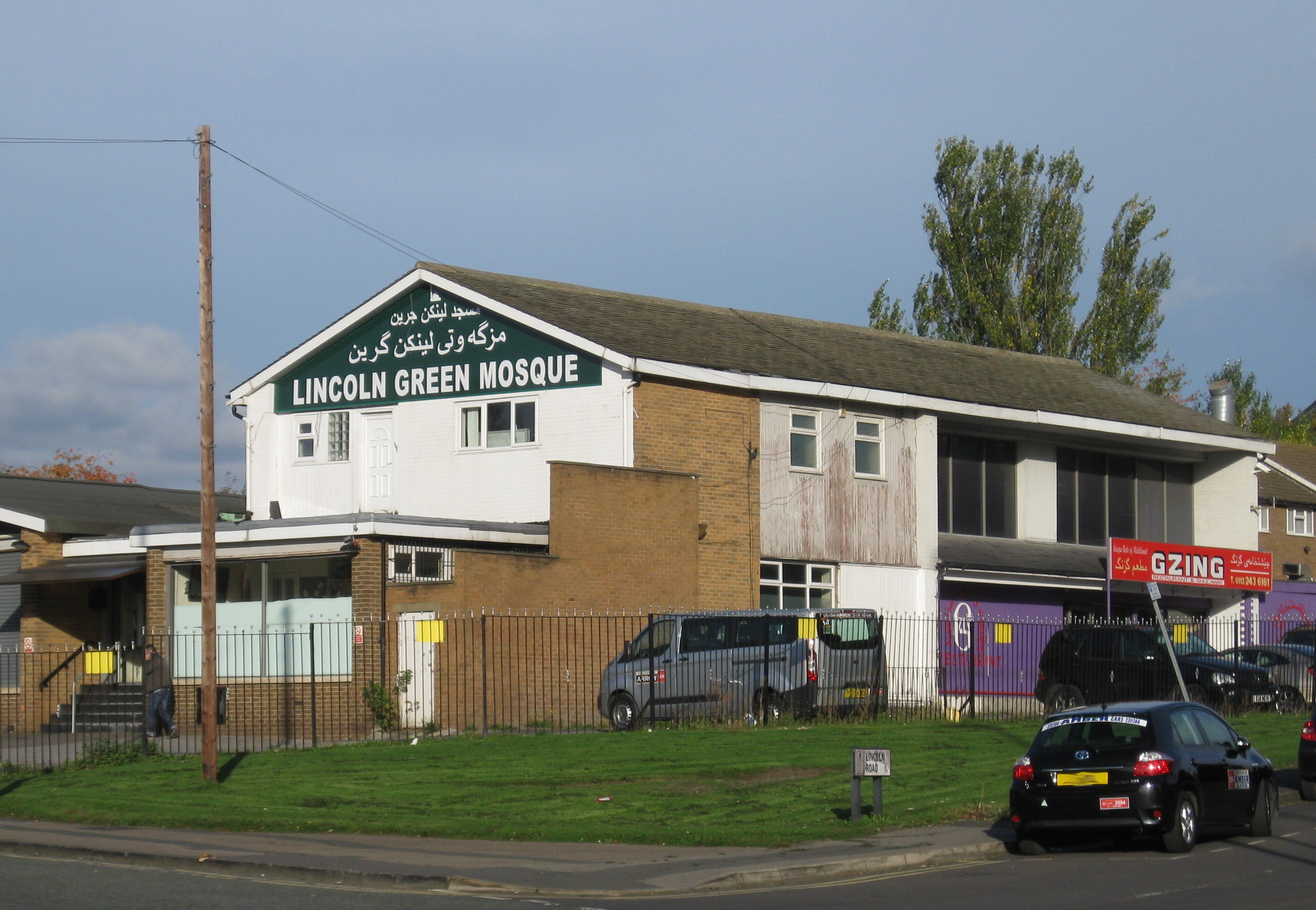
Lincoln Green Mosque

There are two places of worship, the Lincoln Green Mosque, and the Christian Achiever's Faith chapel in a room above shops on Cherry Row. The one pub, the Harp, closed in June 2016: it was said to be the last genuine Irish pub in the city. A Working men's club closed in 2013 and is now demolished with plans for a supermarket on the site.

Lincoln Green was one of the locations which featured in the three-part BBC series Forgotten Britain, a programme which saw Fergal Keane going to a number of struggling communities across Britain. Keane returned to the estate in 2012 and 2022 to catch up with the people he met the first time around, with the second visit becoming part of Alice Doyard's 2023 documentary Brave Britain with Fergal Keane, as broadcast by BBC One. In addition to these BBC productions, Lincoln Green was also featured in the 2009 ITV programme Seven Days on the Breadline.
