= 1982 Leeds City Council election =

1982 UK local government election

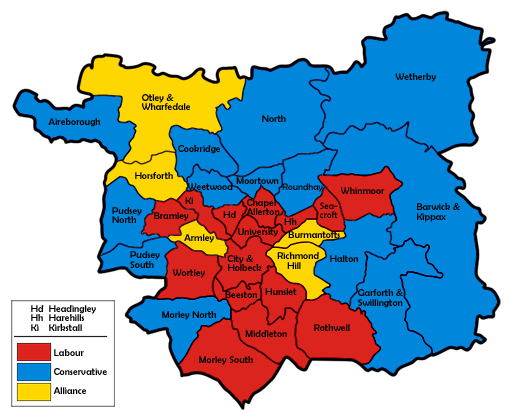
Map of the results for the 1982 Leeds council election.

Elections to Leeds City Council were held on Thursday, 6 May 1982, with one-third of the council to be elected. As well as that, there was a vacancy to fill after the defection of Whinmoor incumbent Edward Hewitt to the newly formed Alliance between the Liberal Party and the Labour-breakaway Social Democratic Party in February, following his colleague and Headingley councillor, Ernest Millet, who had also defected to the SDP two months prior.

The first election featuring the Alliance seen their support increase by a third upon the previous election, mostly at the expense of the Labour vote, but also helped by the comparative absence of minor parties this election. The Alliance surge resulted in Leeds first three-way race for the popular vote, with the Conservatives pipping Labour by less than 3,000 votes.

The large swings from Labour to Alliance produced gains in Burmantofts and Richmond Hill, as well as allowing Conservative gains in Barwick & Kippax, Garforth & Swillington, Morley North and Pudsey South. There was also an Alliance gain from the Conservatives in the already marginal Horsforth, but with the Ecologist absence playing a bigger role there. Despite the inferior vote and near-halving of their majority by six losses, Labour still won a plurality of the seats fought, and gained back the Headingley and Whinmoor seats they'd lost through defections.

== Election result ==
Leeds local election result 1982
Party	Seats	Gains	Losses	Net gain/loss	Seats %	Votes %	Votes	+/−
Labour	16	2	6	-4	47.1	34.4	69,222	-9.3%
Conservative	13	4	1	+3	38.2	35.8	72,113	+1.4%
Alliance	5	3	2	+1	14.7	29.4	59,161	+11.4%
Communist	0	0	0	0	0.0	0.2	475	-0.4%
Ecology	0	0	0	0	0.0	0.1	284	-2.6%

This result has the following consequences for the total number of seats on the council after the elections:

Party	Previous council	New council
Labour	60	56
Conservatives	29	32
Alliance	10	11
Total	99	99
Working majority	21	13

== Ward results ==
Aireborough
Party	Candidate	Votes	%	±%
Conservative	T. Hawkins	3,530	42.1	+1.6
Alliance (Liberal)	G. McCabe	3,062	36.6	+6.5
Labour	P. Booth	1,783	21.3	−5.0
Majority		468	5.6	−4.9
Turnout		8,375		
Conservative hold		Swing	-2.4	

Armley
Party	Candidate	Votes	%	±%
Alliance (Liberal)	M. Roberts	2,531	46.5	−5.1
Labour	A. Gunter	1,600	29.4	−2.0
Conservative	H. Hinchliffe	1,260	23.1	+7.2
Communist	J. Light	53	1.0	−0.1
Majority		931	17.1	−3.1
Turnout		5,444		
Alliance hold		Swing	-1.5	

Barwick & Kippax
Party	Candidate	Votes	%	±%
Conservative	B. Rowley	2,797	42.7	+5.9
Labour	K. Smith	2,581	39.4	−11.6
Alliance (SDP)	D. Howard	1,175	17.9	+11.8
Majority		216	3.3	−10.9
Turnout		6,553		
Conservative gain from Labour		Swing	+8.7	

Beeston
Party	Candidate	Votes	%	±%
Labour	Michael McGowan	2,297	46.3	−4.0
Conservative	W. Birch	1,585	32.0	+4.3
Alliance (SDP)	L. Shaffner	1,074	21.7	+2.1
Majority		712	14.3	−8.3
Turnout		4,956		
Labour hold		Swing	-4.1	

Bramley
Party	Candidate	Votes	%	±%
Labour	A. Atkinson	2,545	45.5	−19.2
Alliance (Liberal)	A. Ballentyne	2,017	36.1	+22.7
Conservative	F. Stubley	1,028	18.4	−3.5
Majority		528	9.4	−33.5
Turnout		5,590		
Labour hold		Swing	-20.9	

Burmantofts
Party	Candidate	Votes	%	±%
Alliance (Liberal)	M. Clay	3,235	53.1	+14.3
Labour	R. Sedler	2,135	35.1	−12.3
Conservative	V. Dodgson	666	10.9	+0.3
Communist	M. Monkman	54	0.9	−2.3
Majority		1,100	18.1	+9.5
Turnout		6,090		
Alliance gain from Labour		Swing	+13.3	

Chapel Allerton
Party	Candidate	Votes	%	±%
Labour	N. Taggart	3,307	55.5	+4.2
Conservative	M. Sexton	1,609	27.0	−6.9
Alliance (Liberal)	C. Smith	1,041	17.5	+8.8
Majority		1,698	28.5	+11.1
Turnout		5,957		
Labour hold		Swing	+5.5	

City & Holbeck
Party	Candidate	Votes	%	±%
Labour	C. Myers	3,022	61.7	−6.1
Alliance (Liberal)	S. Gillen	1,101	22.5	+2.5
Conservative	D. Tomlinson	778	15.9	+3.6
Majority		1,921	39.2	−8.6
Turnout		4,901		
Labour hold		Swing	-4.3	

Cookridge
Party	Candidate	Votes	%	±%
Conservative	J. Carter	3,869	55.9	−2.8
Alliance (SDP)	J. Johnson	2,152	31.1	+16.3
Labour	U. Wadsworth	897	13.0	−8.9
Majority		1,717	24.8	−12.1
Turnout		6,918		
Conservative hold		Swing	-9.5	

Garforth & Swillington
Party	Candidate	Votes	%	±%
Conservative	D. Schofield	2,895	40.5	+2.2
Labour	E. Smith	2,473	34.6	−16.7
Alliance (SDP)	P. Wilson	1,777	24.9	+17.7
Majority		422	5.9	−7.1
Turnout		7,145		
Conservative gain from Labour		Swing	+9.4	

Halton
Party	Candidate	Votes	%	±%
Conservative	D. Wood	3,578	55.9	−3.4
Alliance (SDP)	J. Ratcliffe	1,675	26.2	+19.3
Labour	P. McGreevy	1,151	18.0	−15.9
Majority		1,903	29.7	+4.4
Turnout		6,404		
Conservative hold		Swing	-11.3	

Harehills
Party	Candidate	Votes	%	±%
Labour	T. Briggs	3,083	60.2	−3.3
Conservative	F. Brownbridge	1,306	25.5	−2.4
Alliance (Liberal)	T. Bland	736	14.4	+5.7
Majority		1,777	34.7	−0.9
Turnout		5,125		
Labour hold		Swing	-0.4	

Headingley
Party	Candidate	Votes	%	±%
Labour	Paul Truswell	2,775	45.8	+4.0
Conservative	M. Castle	1,853	30.6	+0.1
Alliance (SDP)	E. Millet	1,291	21.3	+10.9
Communist	B. Cooper	142	2.3	−2.8
Majority		922	15.2	+3.9
Turnout		6,061		
Labour gain from Alliance		Swing	+1.9	

Horsforth
Party	Candidate	Votes	%	±%
Alliance (Liberal)	J. Cummins	3,469	45.6	+2.0
Conservative	V. Stevens	3,335	43.8	+3.8
Labour	J. Monksfield	803	10.6	−0.5
Majority		134	1.8	−1.8
Turnout		7,607		
Alliance gain from Conservative		Swing	-0.9	

Hunslet
Party	Candidate	Votes	%	±%
Labour	Trevor Park	2,823	73.6	−10.8
Alliance (SDP)	G. Fox	657	17.1	+8.3
Conservative	J. Sibbald	354	9.2	+2.5
Majority		2,166	56.5	−19.1
Turnout		3,834		
Labour hold		Swing	-9.5	

Kirkstall
Party	Candidate	Votes	%	±%
Labour	Bernard Atha	3,266	55.8	−7.1
Conservative	A. Walkington	1,738	29.7	+3.1
Alliance (Liberal)	J. Ackrill	769	13.1	+6.7
Communist	B. Jackson	83	1.4	−0.8
Majority		1,528	26.1	−10.2
Turnout		5,856		
Labour hold		Swing	-5.1	

Middleton
Party	Candidate	Votes	%	±%
Labour	I. Walters	2,287	64.0	−9.5
Alliance (Liberal)	D. Hart	662	18.5	+8.4
Conservative	A. Larvin	623	17.4	+4.2
Majority		1,625	45.5	−14.8
Turnout		3,572		
Labour hold		Swing	-8.9	

Moortown
Party	Candidate	Votes	%	±%
Conservative	S. Symmonds	3,198	49.4	−3.5
Alliance (SDP)	M. Harris	2,333	36.1	+22.5
Labour	D. Barker	938	14.5	−13.0
Majority		865	13.4	−12.0
Turnout		6,469		
Conservative hold		Swing	-13.0	

Morley North
Party	Candidate	Votes	%	±%
Conservative	R. Verity	2,748	41.2	+3.6
Labour	N. Hirst	2,334	35.0	−13.5
Alliance (SDP)	H. Smith	1,594	23.9	+15.0
Majority		414	6.2	−4.7
Turnout		6,676		
Conservative gain from Labour		Swing	+8.5	

Morley South
Party	Candidate	Votes	%	±%
Labour	K. Burnley	3,176	51.2	−14.9
Alliance (SDP)	E. Hewitt	1,521	24.5	+24.5
Conservative	J. Sturgeon	1,508	24.3	−3.6
Majority		1,655	26.7	−11.5
Turnout		6,205		
Labour hold		Swing	-19.7	

North
Party	Candidate	Votes	%	±%
Conservative	K. Sibbald	3,430	57.5	−0.1
Alliance (SDP)	J. Midgley	1,833	30.7	+21.5
Labour	B. Payne	706	11.8	−14.4
Majority		1,597	26.8	−4.5
Turnout		5,969		
Conservative hold		Swing	-10.8	

Otley & Wharfedale
Party	Candidate	Votes	%	±%
Alliance (Liberal)	C. Campbell	4,271	47.4	+0.0
Conservative	E. Davies	3,650	40.5	+2.8
Labour	P. Ward	800	8.9	−1.0
Ecology	A. Laurence	284	3.2	−1.8
Majority		621	6.9	−2.8
Turnout		9,005		
Alliance hold		Swing	-1.4	

Pudsey North
Party	Candidate	Votes	%	±%
Conservative	J. Bashall	3,386	44.6	−0.6
Labour	N. Rhodes	2,140	28.2	−9.4
Alliance (SDP)	J. Fothergill	2,070	27.3	+9.9
Majority		1,246	16.4	+8.8
Turnout		7,596		
Conservative hold		Swing	+4.4	

Pudsey South
Party	Candidate	Votes	%	±%
Conservative	J. Mortimer	2,182	34.6	−5.2
Labour	D. Brown	2,141	33.9	−4.0
Alliance (Liberal)	R. Keighley	1,991	31.5	+9.2
Majority		41	0.7	−1.2
Turnout		6,314		
Conservative gain from Labour		Swing	-0.6	

Richmond Hill
Party	Candidate	Votes	%	±%
Alliance (Liberal)	S. Sadler	3,401	55.3	+33.6
Labour	W. Prichard	2,222	36.1	−29.8
Conservative	G. Bullock	529	8.6	−3.8
Majority		1,179	19.2	−25.1
Turnout		6,152		
Alliance gain from Labour		Swing	+31.7	

Rothwell
Party	Candidate	Votes	%	±%
Labour	A. Hudson	2,811	48.4	−9.8
Conservative	D. Boynton	1,485	25.6	−0.6
Alliance (SDP)	P. Burton	1,453	25.0	+15.9
Communist	R. Horsbrough	56	1.0	−1.5
Majority		1,326	22.8	−9.3
Turnout		5,805		
Labour hold		Swing	-4.6	

Roundhay
Party	Candidate	Votes	%	±%
Conservative	J. White	4,407	60.0	−1.7
Alliance (Liberal)	L. Thackray	1,949	26.6	+12.4
Labour	E. McGee	984	13.4	−6.1
Majority		2,458	33.5	−8.7
Turnout		7,340		
Conservative hold		Swing	-7.0	

Seacroft
Party	Candidate	Votes	%	±%
Labour	A. Vollans	2,848	62.8	−15.7
Conservative	J. Higham	855	18.9	+3.7
Alliance (SDP)	T. Ayres	831	18.3	+14.1
Majority		1,993	44.0	−19.3
Turnout		4,534		
Labour hold		Swing	-9.7	

University
Party	Candidate	Votes	%	±%
Labour	D. Jenner	2,698	62.9	+0.7
Alliance (Liberal)	N. Flood	814	19.0	+5.8
Conservative	H. Woodhead	693	16.1	−0.9
Communist	J. Rodgers	87	2.0	−1.8
Majority		1,884	43.9	−1.3
Turnout		4,292		
Labour hold		Swing	-2.5	

Weetwood
Party	Candidate	Votes	%	±%
Conservative	J. Hamilton	3,102	46.2	+0.0
Alliance (SDP)	S. Browning	1,937	28.9	+11.9
Labour	M. Verity	1,671	24.9	−5.1
Majority		1,165	17.4	+1.1
Turnout		6,710		
Conservative hold		Swing	-5.9	

Wetherby
Party	Candidate	Votes	%	±%
Conservative	J. Gray	4,474	68.9	+2.3
Alliance (Liberal)	T. Burgess	1,424	21.9	+12.0
Labour	P. Adams	591	9.1	−3.8
Majority		3,050	47.0	−6.8
Turnout		6,489		
Conservative hold		Swing	-4.8	

Whinmoor
Party	Candidate	Votes	%	±%
Labour	G. Platt	1,866	40.2	−14.3
Labour	R. Blower	1,843		
Conservative	M. Beardsall	1,600	34.5	−1.2
Conservative	W. Buckland	1,527		
Alliance (SDP)	P. Davies	1,173	25.3	+15.5
Alliance (SDP)	M. Lance	1,072		
Majority		243	5.7	−13.1
Turnout		4,639		
Labour hold		Swing		
Labour gain from Alliance		Swing	-6.5	

Wortley
Party	Candidate	Votes	%	±%
Labour	M. Bedford	2,468	37.0	−8.1
Alliance (Liberal)	A. Gilchrist	2,142	32.1	+5.2
Conservative	H. Connah	2,062	30.9	+2.9
Majority		326	4.9	−12.2
Turnout		6,672		
Labour hold		Swing	-6.6	
