= Aireborough =

Former district in West Yorkshire, England

Coordinates: 53.870°N 1.681°W

- Urban district, civil parish
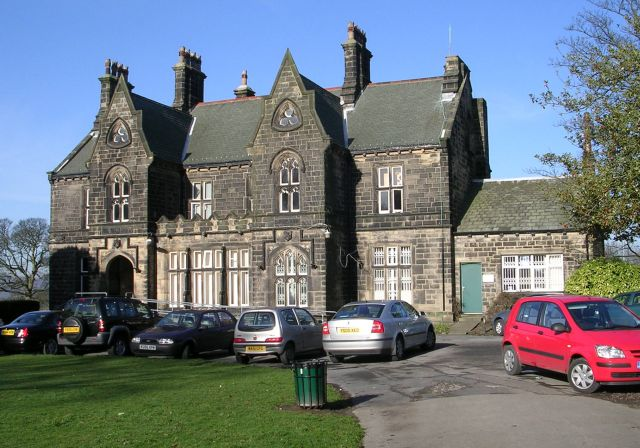
- History
  - Created: 1 April 1937
  - Abolished: 31 March 1974
  - Succeeded by: Leeds City Council
  - HQ: Micklefield House, Rawdon
- Contained within
  - County: West Riding of Yorkshire

Aireborough Urban District boundary as of abolition

Aireborough was a local government district in the West Riding of Yorkshire, England, from 1937 to 1974. It was formed through the abolition of the urban districts of Guiseley, Yeadon and Rawdon and enlarged by the addition of parts of Otley urban district and parts of the civil parishes of Esholt, Hawksworth and Menston in the Wharfedale rural district on 1 April 1937. Aireborough Urban District was administered from Micklefield House in Rawdon, which had been acquired by Rawdon UDC in 1930. The district was abolished on 1 April 1974 when the metropolitan district of Leeds was established.

Aireborough is the name of a UK census ward, which was named "the most average place in England and Wales", following studies arising from the 2001 census.

== Background ==
In 1936, the urban district councils of Guiseley, Yeadon and Rawdon, along with smaller settlements belonging to Wharfedale Rural District, decided to form a new autonomous Urban District Council covering a similar to the former ancient Parish of Guiseley. The name Aireborough was adopted to reflect the equality of all townships included in the district and "wipe out old jealousies, and concentrate on the problems ahead, working together as a team". On 1 April 1937, the urban district came into being. Aireborough Urban District was subsumed by Leeds metropolitan borough under the 1974 local government reorganisation. Ownership of Micklefield House was passed to Leeds City Council but the building was put up for sale in 2022.

== Current usage ==
The name Aireborough has been used by many official bodies or organisations. Yeadon and Guiseley Secondary School was renamed Aireborough Grammar School in 1937 (when the Urban District was formed) and retained the name until its closure in 1991 – the names of the different townships emblazoned on the school frontage are now set into the stone wall opposite Nunroyd Park. The Royal Mail has an Aireborough delivery office.

Community organisations using the name include:

- Aireborough Civic Society
- Aireborough Fundraising Group (Marie Curie)
- Aireborough Neighbourhood Development Forum and Aireborough Historical Society
- Aireborough Learning Partnership
- Aireborough Extended Services
- Aireborough Voluntary Services for the Elderly
- Aireborough Rugby Union Football Club
- Aireborough Swimming Club
- Aireborough Rifle & Revolver Club
- Aireborough Bridge Club
- Aireborough Camera Club
- Aireborough Gilbert & Sullivan Society
- Rotary Club of Aireborough
- Soroptimist International Aireborough
