= Burmantofts =

Area of Leeds, England

Coordinates: 53.8048°N 1.5166°W

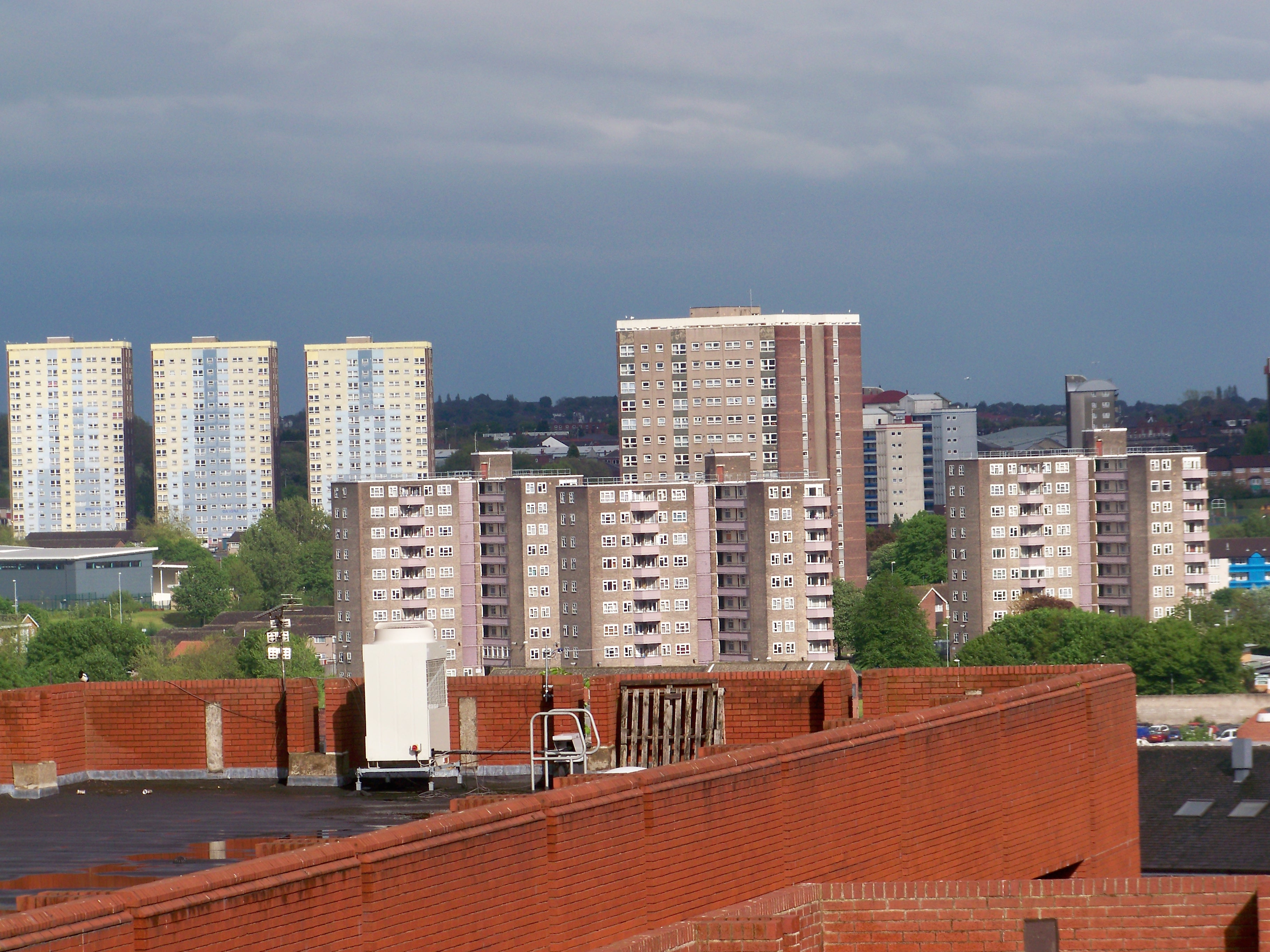
- Skyline of Burmantofts

- Location within West Yorkshire
- Population: 28,528 (Burmantofts and Richmond Hill Ward, 2021 census)
- Metropolitan borough: City of Leeds
- Metropolitan county: West Yorkshire
- Region: Yorkshire and the Humber
- Country: England
- Sovereign state: United Kingdom
- Post town: LEEDS
- Postcode district: LS9
- Dialling code: 0113
- Police: West Yorkshire
- Fire: West Yorkshire
- Ambulance: Yorkshire
- UK Parliament: Leeds South

Burmantofts is an area of 1960s high-rise housing blocks in inner-city east Leeds, West Yorkshire, England adjacent to the city centre and St. James's Hospital. It is a racially diverse area, but suffers the social problems typical of similar areas across the country.

From 1859 to 1957 Burmantofts was the home of Burmantofts Pottery, a manufacturer of ceramic pipes and construction materials.

In the early 20th century, Burmantofts was a large centre of the textile industry. A Burtons textile factory was located in the area; it is still owned by Burtons, but today is being used as a storage facility.

== Etymology ==
The name Burmantofts is first attested, as le Burmantoftes, in 1427. It seems to have been coined in the Middle English period, from the words burghman ('burgher, town-dweller, burgess', from burgh 'town' and man 'person') and toft ('plot of land'. The name refers to the half-acre parcels of land (or tofts) given to owners of building plots (or burgages) by the River Aire, thus Burgage Men's Tofts.

The name is also described in Ralph Thoresby's 1715 book Ducatus Leodiensis as being commonly spelt as Burnitops.

== History ==
The burghers from whom Burmantofts takes its name pursued craft businesses in the town, and grew crops on their tofts, such as grain which would be processed at the nearby mill on what is now Miles Hill.

It was on the edge of the Yorkshire coalfield and coal mines and clay extraction led to works making bricks and earthenware. Notably in 1842 Lassey and Wilcock acquired 100 acres north of Nippet Lane, and found they were able to extract both coal and clay from the same mine and became coal sellers and brickmakers. In 1870 this became Wilcock and Co also selling drainage pipes, though this only occupied 4 acres, the rest being farmland. Further development of the site and of newer products led to Burmantofts Pottery, which was made there until 1957.

In 1878, Burmantofts was the site of Leeds' first municipal waste incinerator, making use of a former industrial chimney.

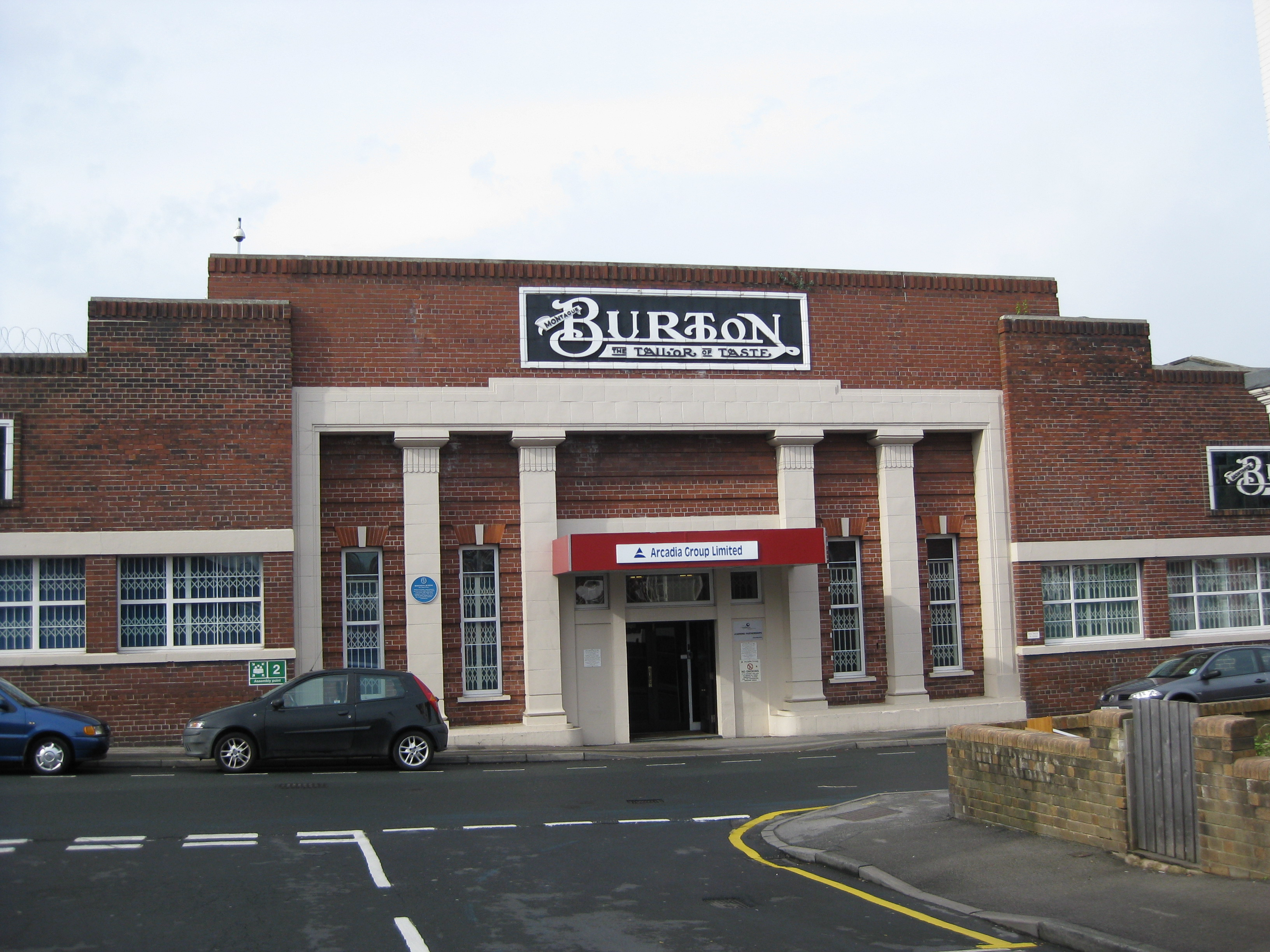
The Burtons factory in Burmantofts is now used only as a warehouse

The area was also home to some textile industry and in 1921, Montague Burton began to develop a site on Hudson Road which eventually became the biggest clothing factory in the world.

After the Second World War Burmantofts was in a very poor condition, however redevelopment did not occur for sometime. While the area was dilapidated and buildings such as the Pineapple Hotel (no 77 Accommodation Road) stood derelict for many years throughout the 1930s and 1940s, no real redevelopment started until the mid-1950s, most of this however was just demolition and in this time only a handful of houses were built around Torre Road and Lupton Avenue. In 1960 the site of Burmantofts Pottery was acquired by the Leeds Corporation and used for housing and the Shakespeare school.

=== St Agnes' parish church ===
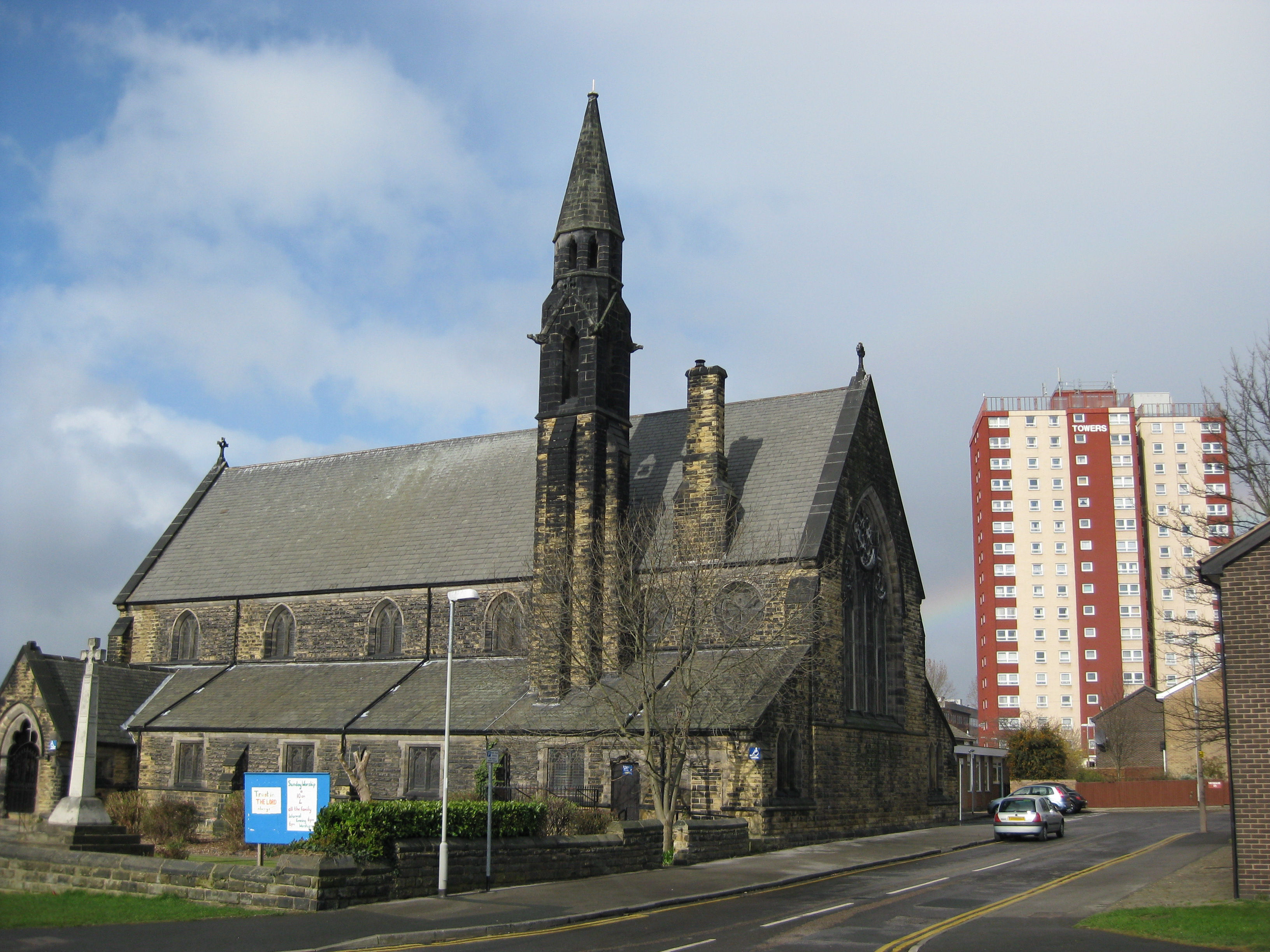
St Agnes Church Exterior

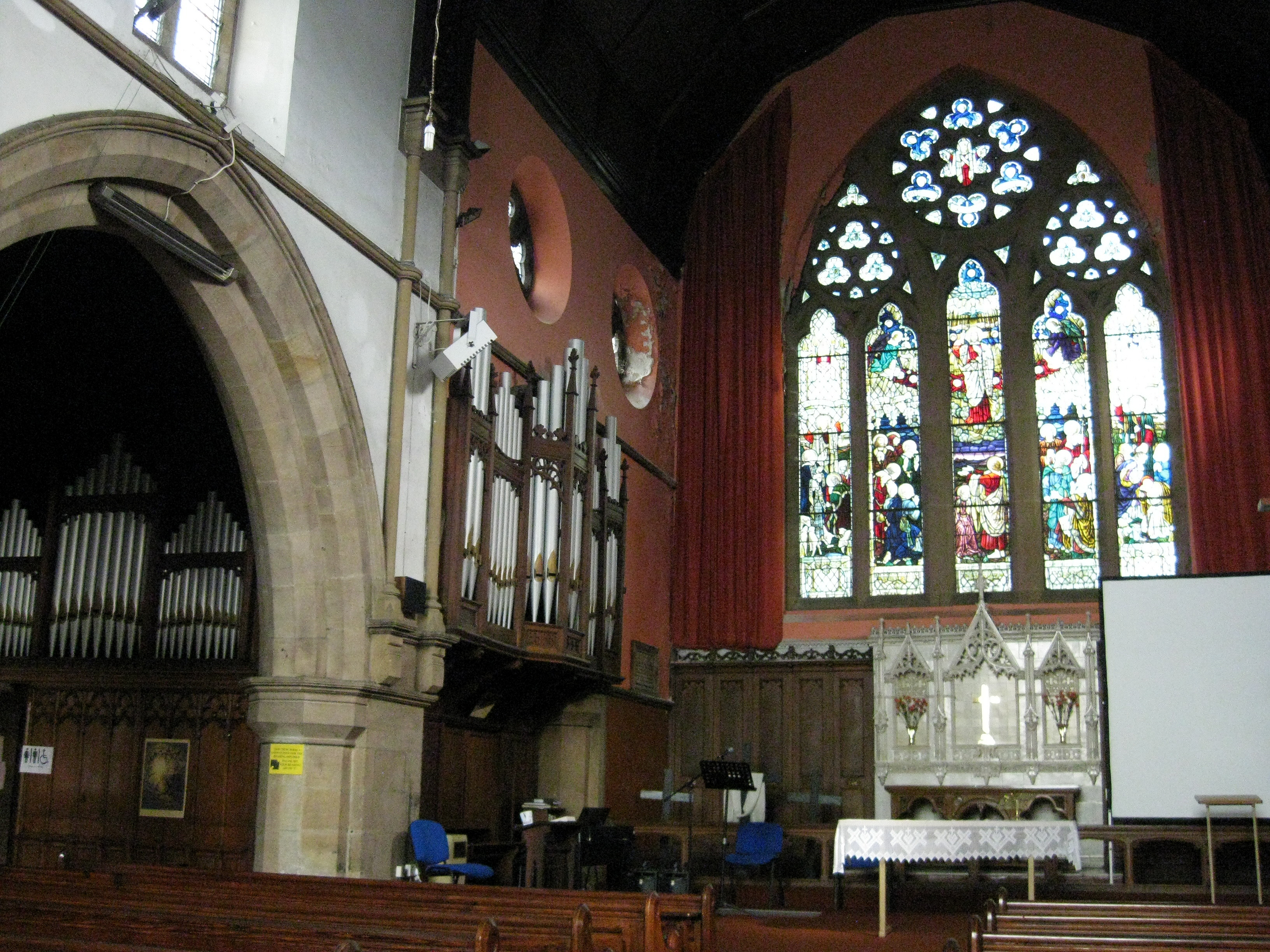
St Agnes' interior, showing organ, altar with reredos in Burmantofts faience and stained glass East window

The only historic building in the area is St Agnes' United Church, the Church of England parish church on Stoney Rock Lane. It is a Gothic Revival building with stone walls and slate roof, designed by Leeds architects John Kelly and Edward Birchall. The foundation stone was laid on 9 July 1887 and the completed church was consecrated by the Bishop of Ripon on 20 May 1889. It was made the parish church in the 1930s when the church of St Stephen (built 1851) was demolished. The west window stained glass in St Agnes' was originally in St Stephen's. The church has a reredos of Burmantofts faience and is a Grade II listed building.

=== Housing ===
There was relatively little housing in Burmantofts until the 20th century: just a few low-rent houses built amongst the mills. Most of the workers in Burmantofts would have lived in nearby areas such as Harehills, however redevelopment through the 1950s and 1960s brought high density living to Burmantofts and it is this redevelopment that has shaped modern Burmantofts.

By the 1960s, neighbouring Lincoln Green was seeing many new high rise council flats being erected, however it did not take long for Burmantofts to catch up and by the mid-1960s most of the blocks that stand today had been completed. Burmantofts as it is known today was completed around the early 1970s, since then changes in the area have been few and far between.

Burmantofts has changed very little in the last forty years, the only area of change is a St James' Hospital, which separated Harehills and Burmantofts. St Bridgets Roman Catholic Secondary Modern School on Torre Road closed down in the 1980s and is now St. Patrick's Primary School, while the transport depot opposite is now the site of Benfield Ford. In September 2006, the area's main secondary school, Primrose High School moved into new premises. With regards to housing, Leeds City Council has not proposed any regeneration in the area, and in recent years is focusing on areas of early-20th century back-to-back housing such as Beeston and Holbeck. There has however been refurbishment of a number of blocks.

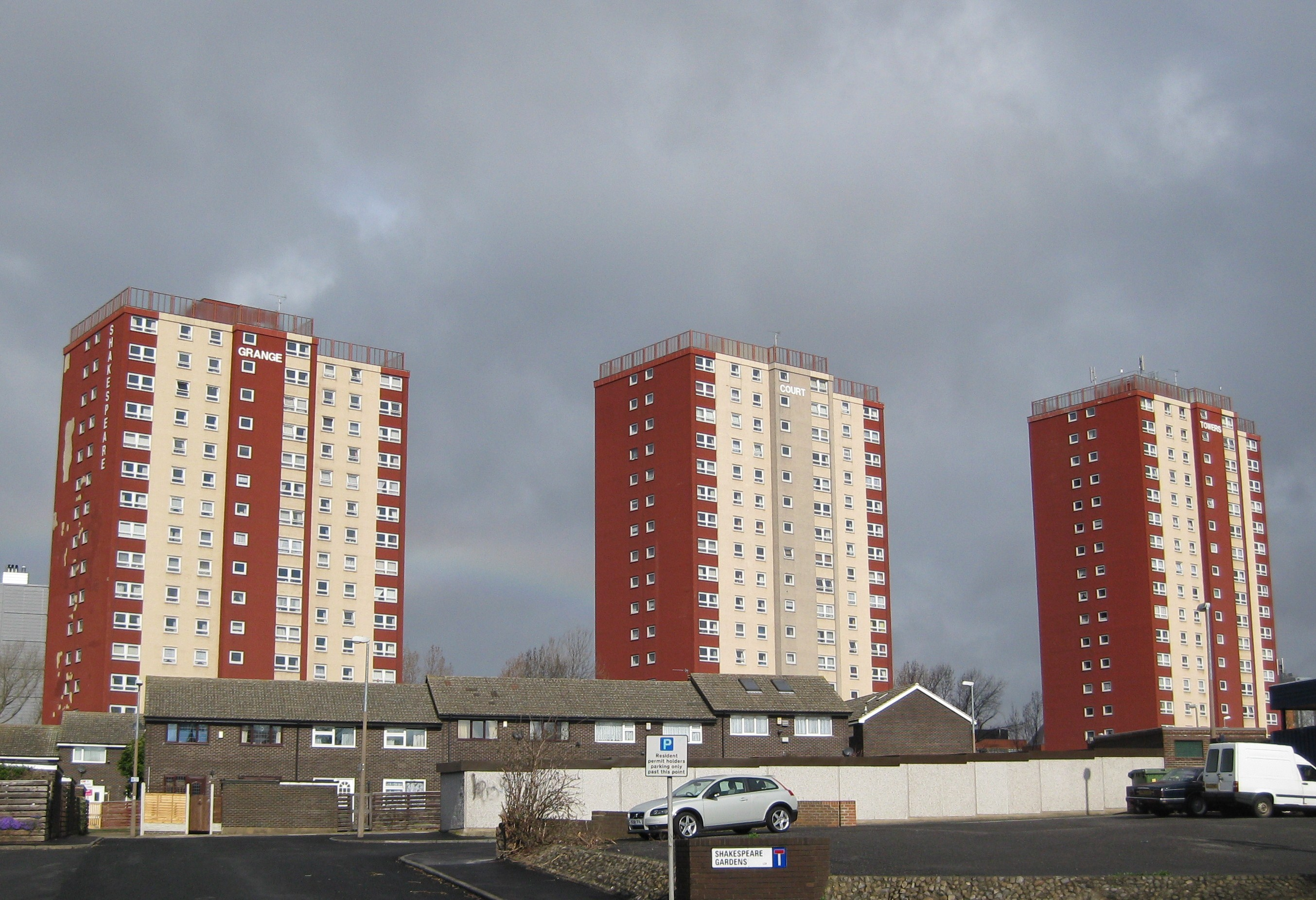
The Shakespeare Flats separate Burmantofts with neighbouring Harehills

At present the majority of the housing in Burmantofts is mid-20th century council-owned housing, mostly made up by multi-story blocks of flats of various heights. A small number of 19th century houses remain close to the Burtons warehouse.

In Leeds, the Inner East sub-area (which includes Burmantofts and Richmond Hill) had among the lowest house prices in the city in 2022.

== Population ==
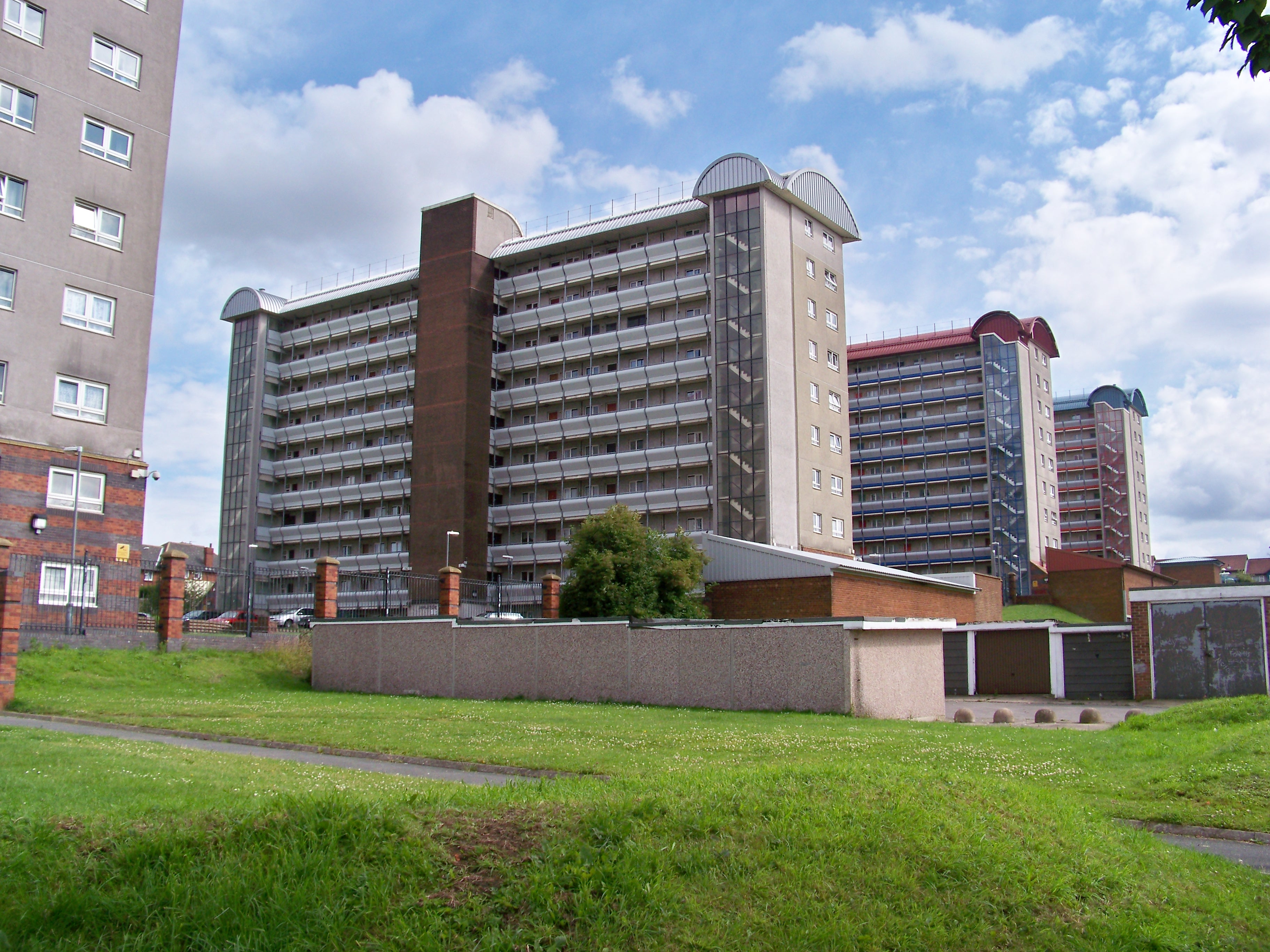
Ebor Gardens estate

The population of the ward at the 2021 Census was 28,528. The census area of Burmantofts and Richmond Hill has a sizeable Black African community, with 15.9% in GP records claiming this ethnicity, compared to 3.4% of Leeds in general.

Burmantofts and Richmond Hill has a high unemployment rate.

== Politics ==
Burmantofts falls into the Burmantofts & Richmond Hill ward of Leeds City Council, currently represented by three Labour ward councillors. Since the 2024 general election the ward has been within the Leeds South parliamentary constituency, for whom Hilary Benn is the Member of Parliament.

== Transport ==
Burmantofts is situated adjacent to the A64 road. It has regular bus routes to the city centre and to other parts of the city, in particular East Leeds. The proposed Leeds Supertram Eastern line was supposed to run in-between Burmantofts and Harehills, however the future of this scheme is uncertain. Other projects have been considered using this route including the Leeds Trolleybus. There is no railway station in Burmantofts, the nearest being Leeds and Cross Gates.

== Facilities ==
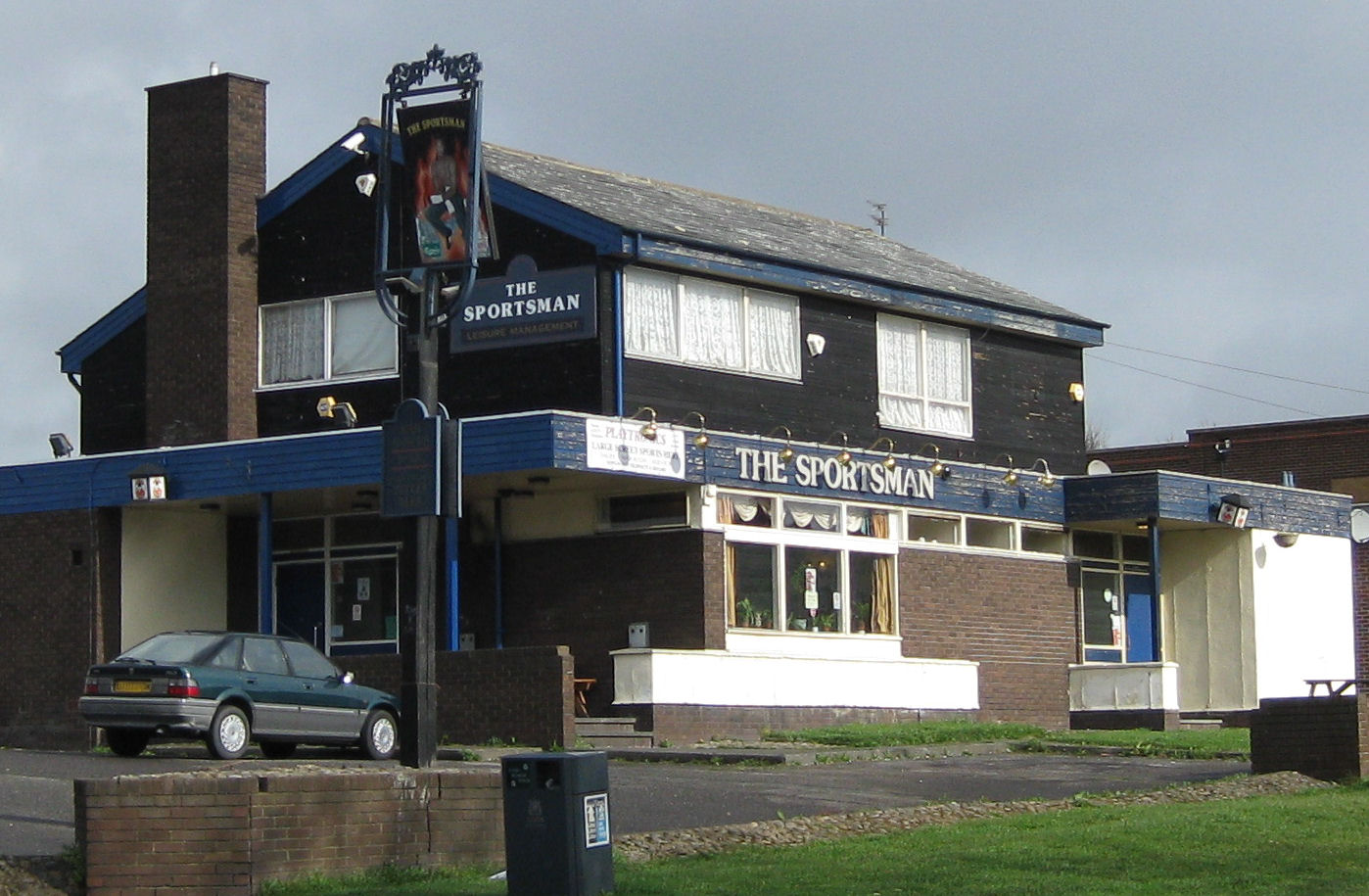
Sportsman Pub, Stoney Rock Lane

Burmantofts has fairly limited facilities. Neighbouring Lincoln Green has a small shopping precinct with a Freshways, Costcutter, Cash Converters and other shops, this is walking distance for most of Burmantofts. Burmantofts itself has Ebor Garden's Primary and St Peter's Primary, the Anglers Club on Nippet Lane, The Sportsman' public house on Stoney Rock Lane and The New Torre on Torre Road. A Heron Foods store opened in 2017 on Lincoln Green Road. Burmantofts is in most parts less than a mile from the Eastern fringes of Leeds city centre providing it with many other amenities close by. Burmantofts amateur boxing club and Bethlehem Jewish boxing club run by former Irish Jewish Champion Lee Murtagh are based in parts of the former Burtons factory, on the corner of Hudson Road and Stoney Rock Lane.

== Education ==
Burmantofts has two secondary schools, Trinity Academy Leeds and Co-op Academy Leeds and Shakespeare Primary School which is on the same site.

== People ==
- Elizabeth Dawn, actress best known for her portrayal of Vera Duckworth in Coronation Street was born and raised in the area.
- Nicola Virginia Adams, the first woman to win an Olympic boxing gold medal, was raised in the area.
- Jabez Tunnicliff, founder of the Band of Hope temperance society, was buried at Burmantofts Cemetery on Sunday 18 June 1865, with a reported attendance of 15,000.

== See also ==
- Listed buildings in Leeds (Burmantofts and Richmond Hill Ward)
