= 1975 Leeds City Council election =

1975 UK local government election

Elections to Leeds City Council were held on 1 May 1975. One third of the seats, as well as an extra vacancy in Aireborough, were up for election. Labour had gained a seat from a by-election in Burley in the interim, prompted by the arrest of incumbent Conservative Ray Forbes in connection with arms smuggling.

The election resulted in a substantial swing to the Conservatives, helping them gain six seats in total, with four from Labour (Burley, Kirkstall, Pudsey South and Wortley) and two from the Liberals (Horsforth and Otley). This established the Conservatives as the largest party on the council, but with the council remaining under no overall control.

== Election result ==
Leeds local election result 1975
Party	Seats	Gains	Losses	Net gain/loss	Seats %	Votes %	Votes	+/−
Conservative	19	6	0	+6	57.6	49.8	86,036	+8.7%
Labour	12	0	4	-4	36.3	31.5	54,379	-8.9%
Liberal	2	0	2	-2	6.1	17.5	30,196	+1.2%
Independent	0	0	0	0	0.0	0.7	1,262	-0.3%
Communist	0	0	0	0	0.0	0.4	660	-0.3%
National Front	0	0	0	0	0.0	0.0	73	-0.2%

This result has the following consequences for the total number of seats on the Council after the elections:

Party	Previous council	New council
Conservatives	37	43
Labour	45	41
Liberals	14	12
Total	96	96
Working majority	0	0

== Ward results ==
Aireborough
Party	Candidate	Votes	%	±%
Conservative	R. Captwright	5,610	61.3	+8.4
Conservative	J. Hutchinson	5,296		
Labour	R. Oddy	2,001	21.9	−10.5
Labour	F. Harman	1,987		
Liberal	Jocelyn Cleasby	1,535	16.8	+2.1
Liberal	Alice Horsfall	1,500		
Majority		3,295	39.5	+18.9
Turnout		9,146		
Conservative hold		Swing		
Conservative hold		Swing	+9.4	

Armley and Castleton
Party	Candidate	Votes	%	±%
Liberal	B. Nelson	2,360	37.5	−22.9
Labour	Michael McGowan	2,255	35.8	+8.4
Conservative	A. Mathers	1,583	25.2	+14.7
Communist	P. Wilton	93	1.5	−0.2
Majority		105	1.7	−31.3
Turnout		6,291		
Liberal hold		Swing	-15.6	

Beeston and Holbeck
Party	Candidate	Votes	%	±%
Labour	H. Booth	2,718	47.6	−6.8
Conservative	G. Hartley	2,103	36.9	+7.5
Liberal	J. Leighton	884	15.5	−0.7
Majority		615	10.8	−14.3
Turnout		5,705		
Labour hold		Swing	-7.1	

Bramley
Party	Candidate	Votes	%	±%
Labour	E. Millett	1,650	52.8	−1.1
Conservative	D. Mitchell	1,476	47.2	+24.2
Liberal	Joy Clayforth			
Majority		174	5.6	−25.2
Turnout				
Labour hold		Swing	-12.6	

Burley
Party	Candidate	Votes	%	±%
Conservative	M. Sexton	1,250	50.9	+15.2
Labour	J. Roche	879	35.8	−3.5
Liberal	N. Mackie	186	7.6	−13.8
National Front	J. Duckenfield	73	3.0	+3.0
Communist	B. Stinson	66	2.7	−0.8
Majority		371	15.1	+11.4
Turnout		2,454		
Conservative gain from Labour		Swing	+9.3	

Burmantofts and Richmond Hill
Party	Candidate	Votes	%	±%
Labour	R. Mulet	2,620	48.1	−17.3
Liberal	Margaret Clay	1,527	28.0	+28.0
Conservative	G. Dimmock	1,220	22.4	−3.8
Communist	B. Stockdale	84	1.5	−1.1
Majority		1,093	20.1	−19.1
Turnout		5,451		
Labour hold		Swing	-22.6	

Chapel Allerton and Scott Hall
Party	Candidate	Votes	%	±%
Conservative	C. Thomas	3,933	62.1	−1.3
Labour	G. Bloom	1,432	22.6	−10.6
Liberal	J. Clay	871	13.8	+13.8
Communist	M. Tomplak	96	1.5	−1.8
Majority		2,501	39.5	+9.3
Turnout		6,332		
Conservative hold		Swing	+4.6	

City and Woodhouse
Party	Candidate	Votes	%	±%
Labour	E. Morris	1,836	51.0	−18.5
Conservative	T. Battersby	1,023	28.4	−2.0
Liberal	D. Selby	608	16.9	+16.9
Communist	M. Rodgers	131	3.6	+3.6
Majority		813	22.6	−16.5
Turnout		3,598		
Labour hold		Swing	-8.2	

Cookridge and Weetwood
Party	Candidate	Votes	%	±%
Conservative	K. Loudon	6,310	72.4	+8.6
Labour	B. Selby	1,269	14.6	−13.9
Liberal	Dorothea Leser	1,136	13.0	+13.0
Majority		5,041	57.8	+22.5
Turnout		8,715		
Conservative hold		Swing	+11.2	

Garforth #1 (Garforth North and Barwick)
Party	Candidate	Votes	%	±%
Conservative	R. Hedley	4,945	65.4	+10.8
Labour	C. Say	1,972	26.1	−19.3
Liberal	N. Parnaby	639	8.5	+8.5
Majority		2,973	39.3	+30.0
Turnout		7,556		
Conservative hold		Swing	+15.0	

Garforth #2 (Kippax and Swillington)
Party	Candidate	Votes	%	±%
Labour	G. Noakes	2,565	80.5	+16.7
Independent	P. Clements	420	13.2	+13.2
Conservative	C. Taylor	202	6.3	−19.0
Majority		2,145	67.3	+28.9
Turnout		3,187		
Labour hold		Swing	+1.7	

Gipton and Whinmoor
Party	Candidate	Votes	%	±%
Labour	A. Vollans	2,597	47.3	−7.8
Conservative	W. Buckland	2,510	45.7	+12.8
Liberal	Kathleen Pedder	385	7.0	−3.2
Majority		87	1.6	−20.5
Turnout		5,492		
Labour hold		Swing	-10.3	

Halton
Party	Candidate	Votes	%	±%
Conservative	D. Wood	4,042	72.3	+2.6
Labour	A. Maher	1,159	20.7	−9.5
Liberal	R. Taylor	389	7.0	+7.0
Majority		2,883	51.6	+12.1
Turnout		5,590		
Conservative hold		Swing	+6.0	

Harehills and Roundhay
Party	Candidate	Votes	%	±%
Conservative	Peggy White	4,766	67.4	+2.5
Labour	M. Simmons	1,668	23.6	+2.1
Liberal	C. Farrer	641	9.1	−4.6
Majority		3,098	43.8	+0.4
Turnout		7,075		
Conservative hold		Swing	+0.2	

Headingley
Party	Candidate	Votes	%	±%
Conservative	J. Searie	2,230	54.7	+9.9
Labour	I. Levy	1,037	25.4	−9.0
Liberal	P. Holmes	812	19.9	−0.9
Majority		1,193	29.2	+18.9
Turnout		4,079		
Conservative hold		Swing	+9.4	

Horsforth
Party	Candidate	Votes	%	±%
Conservative	M. Frame	3,736	52.6	+11.5
Liberal	H. Stuttard	2,633	37.1	−9.0
Labour	F. Wadwell	736	10.4	−2.5
Majority		1,103	15.5	+10.5
Turnout		7,105		
Conservative gain from Liberal		Swing	+10.2	

Hunslet East and West
Party	Candidate	Votes	%	±%
Liberal	M. Taylor	2,528	48.1	−7.6
Labour	Pat Fathers	2,096	39.9	+2.5
Conservative	R. Blackburn	627	11.9	+5.1
Majority		432	8.2	−10.2
Turnout		5,251		
Liberal hold		Swing	-5.0	

Kirkstall
Party	Candidate	Votes	%	±%
Conservative	J. Hamilton	2,366	47.1	+0.0
Labour	K. Fenwick	2,279	45.4	−4.2
Liberal	J. Stevens	379	7.5	+7.5
Majority		87	1.7	−0.8
Turnout		5,024		
Conservative gain from Labour		Swing	+2.1	

Middleton
Party	Candidate	Votes	%	±%
Labour	G. Wood	1,801	56.0	−21.6
Conservative	C. Hallas	808	25.1	+9.0
Liberal	R. Heselwood	513	15.9	+15.9
Communist	D. Priscott	95	3.0	−3.3
Majority		993	30.9	−30.6
Turnout		3,217		
Labour hold		Swing	-15.3	

Moortown
Party	Candidate	Votes	%	±%
Conservative	R. Challenor	2,784	69.3	+3.3
Labour	H. Gunnell	771	19.2	−14.8
Liberal	S. Waldenberg	461	11.5	+11.5
Majority		2,013	50.1	+18.1
Turnout		4,016		
Conservative hold		Swing	+9.0	

Morley #1 (Morley North)
Party	Candidate	Votes	%	±%
Conservative	R. Verity	3,591	67.3	+12.5
Labour	K. Smith	1,744	32.7	−12.5
Majority		1,847	34.6	+24.9
Turnout		5,335		
Conservative hold		Swing	+12.5	

Morley #2 (Morley South)
Party	Candidate	Votes	%	±%
Labour	S. Welham	1,878	42.5	−21.4
Conservative	K. Gray	1,563	35.8	−0.7
Company Director	S. Whittaker	634	14.3	+14.3
Liberal	Margaret Batley	346	7.8	+7.8
Majority		315	7.1	−20.7
Turnout		4,421		
Labour hold		Swing	-10.3	

Osmondthorpe
Party	Candidate	Votes	%	±%
Labour	J. Pritchard	1,506	53.1	−16.2
Conservative	S. Nelmes	1,164	41.0	+10.3
Liberal	Pat Lawson	168	5.9	+5.9
Majority		342	12.1	−26.5
Turnout		2,838		
Labour hold		Swing	-13.2	

Otley
Party	Candidate	Votes	%	±%
Conservative	S. Day	3,550	46.8	+5.7
Liberal	D. Whitley	2,869	37.8	−2.4
Labour	F. Emery	1,167	15.4	−3.3
Majority		681	9.0	+8.1
Turnout		7,586		
Conservative gain from Liberal		Swing	+4.0	

Pudsey #1 (Pudsey North)
Party	Candidate	Votes	%	±%
Conservative	C. Thompson	3,279	50.7	+16.4
Liberal	R. Hainsworth	1,711	26.5	−7.2
Labour	D. Trafford	1,475	22.8	−9.2
Majority		1,568	24.3	+23.6
Turnout		6,465		
Conservative hold		Swing	+11.8	

Pudsey #2 (Pudsey South)
Party	Candidate	Votes	%	±%
Conservative	P. Kersting	2,964	46.0	+22.5
Labour	J. Mann	1,945	30.2	−2.2
Liberal	B. Lester	1,535	23.8	−15.0
Majority		1,019	15.8	+9.4
Turnout		6,444		
Conservative gain from Labour		Swing	+12.3	

Rothwell
Party	Candidate	Votes	%	±%
Labour	S. Arran	2,587	41.1	−24.1
Conservative	K. Bragan	1,993	31.7	−3.0
Liberal	P. Bower	1,708	27.2	+27.2
Majority		594	9.4	−21.2
Turnout		6,288		
Labour hold		Swing	-10.5	

Seacroft
Party	Candidate	Votes	%	±%
Labour	G. Mudie	2,016	57.6	−20.3
Conservative	R. Ivey	1,388	39.7	+21.7
Communist	A. Dale	95	2.7	−1.5
Majority		628	17.9	−42.1
Turnout		3,499		
Labour hold		Swing	-21.0	

Stanningley
Party	Candidate	Votes	%	±%
Labour	C. Myers	1,573	42.6	−11.8
Conservative	I. Benton	1,312	35.5	+7.1
Liberal	R. Keighley	811	21.9	+4.7
Majority		261	7.1	−18.8
Turnout		3,696		
Labour hold		Swing	-9.4	

Talbot
Party	Candidate	Votes	%	±%
Conservative	R. Feldman	3,249	70.8	+10.8
Labour	D. Brown	690	15.0	+2.4
Liberal	J. Miles	649	14.1	−13.2
Majority		2,559	55.8	+23.1
Turnout		4,588		
Conservative hold		Swing	+4.2	

Wetherby
Party	Candidate	Votes	%	±%
Conservative	W. Hill	5,853	71.9	+5.2
Liberal	D. Tunstall	1,348	16.6	+16.6
Labour	C. Brown	732	9.0	−14.7
Retired	J. Shackleton	208	2.6	−7.1
Majority		4,505	55.3	+12.3
Turnout		8,141		
Conservative hold		Swing	-5.7	

Wortley
Party	Candidate	Votes	%	±%
Conservative	R. Robson	2,606	53.2	+11.1
Labour	P. Shires	1,725	35.2	−6.5
Liberal	Jeanette Bean	564	11.5	−4.6
Majority		881	18.0	+17.5
Turnout		4,895		
Conservative gain from Labour		Swing	+8.8	
