= 2000 Leeds City Council election =

2000 UK local government election

- 4 May 2000

33 of the 99 seats on Leeds City Council 50 seats needed for a majority
	First party	Second party	Third party
Party	Labour	Liberal Democrats	Conservative
Last election	21 seats, 46.1%	9 seats, 22.2%	5 seats, 27.6%
Seats won	17	8	7
Seats after	61	19	16
Seat change	▼8	▲4	▲4
Popular vote	58,198	33,916	48,031
Percentage	39.1%	22.8%	32.3%
Swing	▼7.0pp	▲0.6pp	▲4.7pp
	Fourth party
Party	Green
Last election	1 seat, 3.6%
Seats won	1
Seats after	2
Seat change	▲1
Popular vote	5,906
Percentage	4.0%
Swing	▲0.4%
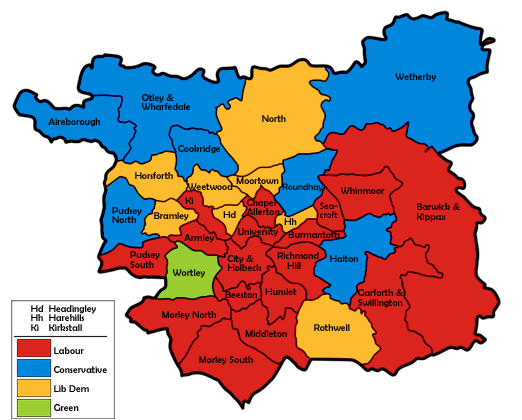
- Map of the results for the 2000 Leeds council election.

The 2000 Leeds City Council election took place on 4 May 2000 to elect members of City of Leeds Metropolitan Borough Council in West Yorkshire, England. Since the last election, Labour had lost a by-election to the Lib Dems in Harehills, and long-serving Chapel Allerton councillor, Garth Frankland, had defected from Labour to Left Alliance. One third of the council was up for election and the Labour party stayed in overall control of the council. Overall turnout in the election was 27.5%.

== Election result ==
Leeds local election result 2000
Party	Seats	Gains	Losses	Net gain/loss	Seats %	Votes %	Votes	+/−
Labour	17	1	9	-8	51.5	39.1	58,198	-7.0
Liberal Democrats	8	4	0	+4	24.2	22.8	33,916	+0.6
Conservative	7	4	0	+4	21.2	32.3	48,031	+4.7
Green	1	1	0	+1	3.0	4.0	5,906	+0.4
Leeds Left Alliance	0	0	1	-1	0.0	1.1	1,659	+0.7
Independent	0	0	0	0	0.0	0.5	697	+0.4
BNP	0	0	0	0	0.0	0.1	166	+0.1
UKIP	0	0	0	0	0.0	0.0	74	+0.0

This result had the following consequences for the total number of seats on the council after the elections:

Party	Previous council	New council
Labour	69	61
Liberal Democrat	15	19
Conservative	12	16
Green	1	2
Independent Socialist	1	1
Left Alliance	1	0
Total	99	99
Working majority	41	23

== Ward results ==
Aireborough
Party	Candidate	Votes	%	±%
Conservative	Graham Latty	3,142	47.1	+6.5
Labour	Tony Addison	2,470	37.0	−6.6
Liberal Democrats	Ian Hutton	1,058	15.9	+0.1
Majority		672	10.1	+7.1
Turnout		6,670	33.9	+0.1
Conservative gain from Labour		Swing	+6.5	

Armley
Party	Candidate	Votes	%	±%
Labour	James McKenna	1,637	50.3	−10.9
Conservative	Steven Welsh	810	24.9	+8.1
Liberal Democrats	Andrew Davies	541	16.6	+1.1
Green	Yvonne Clarke	236	7.2	+0.7
Leeds Left Alliance	Michael Davies	33	1.0	+1.0
Majority		827	25.4	−18.9
Turnout		3,257	20.7	−0.2
Labour hold		Swing	-9.5	

Barwick & Kippax
Party	Candidate	Votes	%	±%
Labour	Keith Wakefield	2,766	49.9	−10.9
Conservative	Jack Stott	2,035	36.7	+9.8
Liberal Democrats	Anne Bagnall	743	13.4	+1.1
Majority		731	13.2	−20.6
Turnout		5,544	30.9	−2.0
Labour hold		Swing	-10.3	

Beeston
Party	Candidate	Votes	%	±%
Labour	David Congreve	1,351	45.8	−11.0
Conservative	William Birch	988	33.5	+5.3
Liberal Democrats	Pauline Davies	528	17.9	+2.7
Green	Janet Pritchard	86	2.9	+2.9
Majority		363	12.3	−16.3
Turnout		2,953	24.1	+2.6
Labour hold		Swing	-8.1	

Bramley
Party	Candidate	Votes	%	±%
Liberal Democrats	Linda Sullivan	1,596	46.4	−1.1
Labour	Michael McGowan	1,361	39.6	−5.1
Conservative	Michael Best	396	11.5	+3.8
Green	Pamela Brown	84	2.4	+2.4
Majority		235	6.8	+4.0
Turnout		3,437	21.0	+0.7
Liberal Democrats hold		Swing	+2.0	

Burmantofts
Party	Candidate	Votes	%	±%
Labour	Ronald Grahame	1,700	63.0	−4.3
Liberal Democrats	Terence Ineson	532	19.7	+0.8
Conservative	Karl Steenson	372	13.8	+5.4
Green	Peggy Alexander	68	2.5	+2.5
Leeds Left Alliance	Gareth Christie	26	1.0	−4.4
Majority		1,168	43.3	−5.1
Turnout		2,698	20.6	−0.4
Labour hold		Swing	-2.5	

Chapel Allerton
Party	Candidate	Votes	%	±%
Labour	Eileen Moxon	2,151	47.5	−11.7
Leeds Left Alliance	Garth Frankland	1,058	23.4	+23.4
Liberal Democrats	Arif Hussain	720	15.9	+3.2
Conservative	Arshad Ali	595	13.2	−8.4
Majority		1,093	24.2	−13.5
Turnout		4,524	30.9	+4.0
Labour gain from Leeds Left Alliance		Swing	-17.5	

City & Holbeck
Party	Candidate	Votes	%	±%
Labour	Elizabeth Nash	1,494	56.2	−5.0
Conservative	David Boynton	488	18.4	+3.9
Liberal Democrats	Ann Norman	417	15.7	+1.1
Green	Milan Ghosh	138	5.2	+1.1
Leeds Left Alliance (Socialist)	David Jones	122	4.6	−1.1
Majority		1,006	37.8	−8.7
Turnout		2,659	17.5	−1.7
Labour hold		Swing	-4.4	

Cookridge
Party	Candidate	Votes	%	±%
Conservative	Keith Loudon	3,058	49.1	−2.5
Liberal Democrats	Richard Harker	1,781	28.6	+13.0
Labour	Jane Dowson	1,256	20.1	−10.1
Green	Peter Scarth	139	2.2	−0.4
Majority		1,277	20.5	−0.9
Turnout		6,234	37.0	+3.6
Conservative hold		Swing	-7.7	

Garforth & Swillington
Party	Candidate	Votes	%	±%
Labour	Thomas Murray	2,734	50.7	−10.7
Conservative	Jean Higham	1,666	30.9	+6.8
Liberal Democrats	Ian Dowling	996	18.5	+3.9
Majority		1,068	19.8	−17.5
Turnout		5,396	29.1	+0.6
Labour hold		Swing	-8.7	

Halton
Party	Candidate	Votes	%	±%
Conservative	William Hyde	2,681	47.5	+5.6
Labour	Patrict Davey	2,248	39.8	−5.1
Liberal Democrats	David Hollingsworth	720	12.7	−0.5
Majority		433	7.7	+4.7
Turnout		5,649	31.2	+3.2
Conservative gain from Labour		Swing	+5.3	

Harehills
Party	Candidate	Votes	%	±%
Liberal Democrats	Andrew Tear	2,198	49.8	−1.6
Labour	Mohammed Kahn	1,889	42.8	−1.9
Conservative	Luke Steenson	195	4.4	+0.6
Green	Paul Marchant	92	2.1	+2.1
Leeds Left Alliance	Timothy Watson	37	0.8	+0.8
Majority		309	7.0	+0.3
Turnout		4,411	31.5	−1.5
Liberal Democrats gain from Labour		Swing	+0.1	

Headingley
Party	Candidate	Votes	%	±%
Liberal Democrats	David Morton	1,443	41.9	−2.1
Labour	William Rollinson	1,292	37.5	−0.9
Green	Lesley Jeffries	364	10.6	+1.0
Conservative	James Thornton	346	10.0	+2.0
Majority		151	4.4	−1.2
Turnout		3,445	16.3	−3.7
Liberal Democrats gain from Labour		Swing	-0.6	

Horsforth
Party	Candidate	Votes	%	±%
Liberal Democrats	Andrew Barker	2,209	39.8	−6.9
Conservative	John Hardcastle	2,034	36.6	+9.9
Labour	John Garvani	1,137	20.5	−1.8
Green	Andrea Binns	174	3.1	+3.1
Majority		175	3.2	−16.8
Turnout		5,554	32.2	−1.1
Liberal Democrats hold		Swing	-8.4	

Hunslet
Party	Candidate	Votes	%	±%
Labour	Geoffrey Driver	1,409	70.5	−5.1
Liberal Democrats	Christine Golton	468	23.4	+12.8
Green	Stephanie Hoare	121	6.1	+3.1
Majority		941	47.1	−17.4
Turnout		1,998	17.9	−0.7
Labour hold		Swing	-8.9	

Kirkstall
Party	Candidate	Votes	%	±%
Labour	Elizabeth Minkin	2,070	60.8	−5.9
Conservative	David Higgott	594	17.5	+3.8
Liberal Democrats	Natasha De Vere	473	13.9	+2.0
Green	Martin Reed	265	7.8	+0.1
Majority		1,476	43.3	−9.7
Turnout		3,402	21.9	+0.2
Labour hold		Swing	-4.8	

Middleton
Party	Candidate	Votes	%	±%
Labour	Jack Dunn	1,618	59.2	−6.1
Conservative	Susan Nicholls	717	26.2	+4.4
Liberal Democrats	Martin Allinson	321	11.7	−1.2
Green	Timothy Goodall	77	2.8	+2.8
Majority		901	33.0	−10.5
Turnout		2,733	18.7	−1.0
Labour hold		Swing	-5.2	

Moortown
Party	Candidate	Votes	%	±%
Liberal Democrats	Mark Harris	2,758	49.8	+1.1
Labour	James Lewis	1,381	24.9	−7.0
Conservative	Timothy Hayles	1,199	21.6	+2.2
Green	Irene Dracup	130	2.3	+2.3
Leeds Left Alliance	Kevin Pattison	71	1.3	+1.3
Majority		1,377	24.9	+8.1
Turnout		5,539	34.6	−0.1
Liberal Democrats hold		Swing	+4.0	

Morley North
Party	Candidate	Votes	%	±%
Labour	Michael Dawson	2,156	43.9	−11.2
Conservative	David Schofield	2,004	40.8	+10.4
Liberal Democrats	Rochelle Harris	530	10.8	+0.0
Green	Jacqueline Hackman	223	4.5	+0.8
Majority		152	3.1	−21.6
Turnout		4,913	26.0	+1.0
Labour hold		Swing	-10.8	

Morley South
Party	Candidate	Votes	%	±%
Labour	Bryan North	2,255	51.2	−8.0
Conservative	Stephen Kearns	1,397	31.7	+6.1
Liberal Democrats	Judith Chapman	588	13.3	−1.8
BNP	Mark Dodd	166	3.8	+3.8
Majority		858	19.5	−14.1
Turnout		4,406	20.1	+0.8
Labour hold		Swing	-7.1	

North
Party	Candidate	Votes	%	±%
Liberal Democrats	Jonathan Brown	2,628	43.3	+10.3
Conservative	Caroline Anderson	2,426	40.1	−1.4
Labour	Arthur Giles	877	14.5	−10.9
Green	Peter Harris	93	1.5	+1.5
Leeds Left Alliance	Brian Jackson	32	0.5	+0.5
Majority		202	3.2	−5.2
Turnout		6,056	35.7	+2.9
Liberal Democrats hold		Swing	+5.9	

Otley & Wharfedale
Party	Candidate	Votes	%	±%
Conservative	Clive Fox	2,742	37.5	+4.5
Liberal Democrats	Colin Campbell	1,990	27.2	−13.7
Labour	John Eveleigh	1,742	23.8	−2.3
Independent	Nigel Francis	697	9.5	+9.5
Green	Lera Miles	141	1.9	+1.9
Majority		752	10.3	+2.4
Turnout		7,312	38.6	−0.1
Conservative gain from Labour		Swing	+9.1	

Pudsey North
Party	Candidate	Votes	%	±%
Conservative	Andrew Carter	4,094	66.1	+11.5
Labour	Anne Cherry	1,442	23.3	−11.8
Liberal Democrats	Christine Glover	657	10.6	+0.3
Majority		2,652	42.8	+23.3
Turnout		6,193	34.5	−1.1
Conservative hold		Swing	+11.6	

Pudsey South
Party	Candidate	Votes	%	±%
Labour	Eugene "Mick" Coulson	2,013	43.9	−7.5
Conservative	Audrey Smith	1,861	40.6	+3.8
Liberal Democrats	Pauline Bardon	572	12.5	+4.2
Green	Graham Illingworth	139	3.0	−0.4
Majority		152	3.3	−11.3
Turnout		4,585	27.1	+0.6
Labour hold		Swing	-5.6	

Richmond Hill
Party	Candidate	Votes	%	±%
Labour	Michael Lyons	1,656	67.3	−7.9
Liberal Democrats	Keith Norman	369	15.0	+0.2
Conservative	Victoria Richmond	305	12.4	+2.4
Leeds Left Alliance (Independent Labour)	Neville Place	131	5.3	+5.3
Majority		1,287	52.3	−8.0
Turnout		2,461	19.9	+1.3
Labour hold		Swing	-4.0	

Rothwell
Party	Candidate	Votes	%	±%
Liberal Democrats	Donald Wilson	2,007	44.9	+20.3
Labour	Lorna Cohen	1,743	39.0	−18.0
Conservative	Caroline Judge	718	16.1	−2.3
Majority		264	5.9	−26.5
Turnout		4,468	28.1	+3.5
Liberal Democrats gain from Labour		Swing	+19.1	

Roundhay
Party	Candidate	Votes	%	±%
Conservative	Ann Castle	2,782	44.3	+3.8
Labour	Kate Newstead	2,542	40.5	−4.7
Liberal Democrats	John Skinner	696	11.1	−3.2
Green	Colin Johnston	164	2.6	+2.6
Leeds Left Alliance	Malcolm Christie	95	1.5	+1.5
Majority		240	3.8	−0.9
Turnout		6,279	37.8	+2.2
Conservative gain from Labour		Swing	+4.2	

Seacroft
Party	Candidate	Votes	%	±%
Labour	Graham Hyde	1,998	73.7	−4.0
Conservative	Donald Townsley	344	12.7	+3.8
Liberal Democrats	Sadie Fisher	225	8.3	+1.9
UKIP	Raymond Northgreaves	74	2.7	+2.7
Green	Michael Bolton	69	2.5	−0.8
Majority		1,654	61.0	−7.8
Turnout		2,710	22.4	+0.9
Labour hold		Swing	-3.9	

University
Party	Candidate	Votes	%	±%
Labour	Maggie Giles-Hill	1,349	59.6	+4.0
Liberal Democrats	Edmund Coneybeare	396	17.5	−7.0
Conservative	Robert Winfield	263	11.6	+3.0
Green	Bluebell Eikonoklastes	200	8.8	+2.2
Leeds Left Alliance	Amanda Munro	54	2.4	+2.4
Majority		953	42.1	+11.0
Turnout		2,262	14.4	−2.3
Labour hold		Swing	+5.5	

Weetwood
Party	Candidate	Votes	%	±%
Liberal Democrats	James Souper	2,267	40.7	+1.1
Labour	Judith Blake	2,023	36.3	−2.9
Conservative	Graham Castle	1,049	18.8	+2.1
Green	David Webb	233	4.2	−0.4
Majority		244	4.4	+4.0
Turnout		5,572	34.0	−1.0
Liberal Democrats gain from Labour		Swing	+2.0	

Wetherby
Party	Candidate	Votes	%	±%
Conservative	Gerald Wilkinson	4,823	68.7	+10.8
Labour	Reginald Steel	1,341	19.1	−6.1
Liberal Democrats	Michael Welby	860	12.2	−4.7
Majority		3,482	49.6	+16.9
Turnout		7,024	34.0	−2.0
Conservative hold		Swing	+8.4	

Whinmoor
Party	Candidate	Votes	%	±%
Labour	Suzanne Armitage	1,751	50.1	−4.1
Conservative	Valerie Kendall	1,317	37.7	+8.3
Liberal Democrats	Andrew Bell	425	12.2	+3.0
Majority		434	12.4	−12.4
Turnout		3,493	26.2	+0.7
Labour hold		Swing	-6.2	

Wortley
Party	Candidate	Votes	%	±%
Green	Claire Nash	2,670	55.5	+1.3
Labour	Philip Towler	1,346	28.0	−7.4
Conservative	Glenn Broadbent	590	12.3	+9.0
Liberal Democrats	Barbara Thompson	204	4.2	−3.0
Majority		1,324	27.5	+8.6
Turnout		4,810	28.1	−1.0
Green gain from Labour		Swing	+4.3	

== By-elections between 2000 and 2002 ==
Morley North by-election 7 June 2001 replacing Michael Dawson (resigned)
Party	Candidate	Votes	%	±%
Labour	Jayne Hill	4,851	44.8	+0.9
Conservative		2,929	27.0	−13.8
Independent		1,475	13.6	+13.6
Liberal Democrats		1,070	9.9	−0.9
BNP		262	2.4	+2.4
Green		249	2.3	−2.2
Majority		1,922	17.8	+14.7
Turnout		9,836		
Labour hold		Swing	+7.3	

University by-election 7 June 2001 replacing Maggie Giles-Hill (resigned)
Party	Candidate	Votes	%	±%
Labour	Michael McGowan	2,948	55.4	−4.2
Liberal Democrats	John Burke	1,357	25.5	+8.0
Conservative	Robert Winfield	582	10.9	−0.7
Green	Bluebell Eikonoklastes	414	7.8	−1.0
Independent	William Howells	21	0.4	+0.4
Majority		1,591	29.9	−12.2
Turnout		5,322	35.5	+21.1
Labour hold		Swing	-6.1	

Moortown by-election 19 July 2001 replacing Christine Brett (resigned)
Party	Candidate	Votes	%	±%
Liberal Democrats	Richard Harker	2,236	46.7	−3.1
Labour	Irene O'Grady	1,641	34.3	+9.4
Conservative	Valerie Kendall	792	16.6	−5.1
Leeds Left Alliance	Michael Davies	114	2.4	+1.1
Majority		595	12.4	−12.5
Turnout		4,783	33.8	−0.8
Liberal Democrats hold		Swing	-6.2	
