= 2002 Leeds City Council election =

2002 UK local government election

- 2 May 2002

33 of the 99 seats on Leeds City Council 50 seats needed for a majority
	First party	Second party	Third party
Party	Labour	Conservative	Liberal Democrats
Last election	17 seats, 39.1%	7 seats, 32.3%	8 seats, 22.8%
Seats won	19	7	5
Seats after	57	18	20
Seat change	▼4	▲2	▲1
Popular vote	68,049	47,947	36,749
Percentage	41.4%	29.2%	22.3%
Swing	▲2.2pp	▼3.1pp	▼0.5pp
	Fourth party
Party	Green
Last election	1 seat, 4.5%
Seats won	1
Seats after	3
Seat change	▲1
Popular vote	7,332
Percentage	4.5%
Swing	▲0.5%
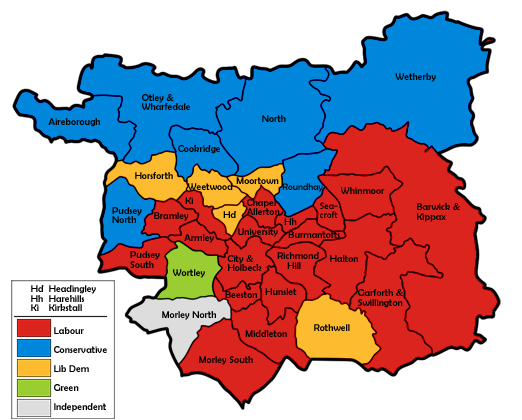
- Map of the results for the 2002 Leeds council election.

The 2002 Leeds City Council election took place on 2 May 2002 to elect members of City of Leeds Metropolitan Borough Council in West Yorkshire, England. Prior to the election, there had been several by-elections held with no change to the council composition. One third of the council was up for election and the Labour party stayed in overall control of the council.

== Campaign ==
33 seats were contested in the election with Labour defending 23 seats, the Conservatives 5, Liberal Democrats 4 and 1 independent. Among the candidates who stood in the election was, Mark Collett, the leader of the youth wing of the British National Party, who stood in Harehills ward.

Among the issued raised in the election were disaffection with the national Labour government, a recent reversed decision by the council to close day car centres for the elderly, privatisation of services, investment levels in schools and council tax levels. Labour defended their record in control of the council, which they had run for the previous 22 years, in what was expected to be a hard-fought contest.

== Election result ==
The results saw Labour maintain a majority on the council despite losing some seats to other parties. They lost 2 seats to the Conservatives in Aireborough and Otley and Wharfedale, 2 to the Liberal Democrats in Headingley and Rothwell, and one each to an Independent in Morley North and the Greens in Wortley. However Labour did gain one seat from the Liberal Democrats in Harehills and one in Hunslet from an Independent Socialist. As a result, they won 19 of the 33 seats contested meaning they had 57 of the 99 councillors on Leeds council. Overall turnout in the election was 30.64%.

Leeds local election result 2002
Party	Seats	Gains	Losses	Net gain/loss	Seats %	Votes %	Votes	+/−
Labour	19	2	6	-4	57.6	41.4	68,049	+2.2
Conservative	7	2	0	+2	21.2	29.2	47,947	-3.1
Liberal Democrats	5	2	1	+1	15.2	22.3	36,749	-0.5
Green	1	1	0	+1	3.0	4.5	7,332	+0.5
Independent	1	1	0	+1	3.0	1.4	2,228	+0.9
Leeds Left Alliance	0	0	0	0	0.0	0.8	1,265	-0.1
Socialist Alliance	0	0	0	0	0.0	0.2	392	+0.2
BNP	0	0	0	0	0.0	0.1	209	+0.0
Socialist	0	0	0	0	0.0	0.1	201	+0.0
Socialist Labour	0	0	0	0	0.0	0.05	77	+0.05

This result had the following consequences for the total number of seats on the council after the elections:

Party	Previous council	New council
Labour	61	57
Liberal Democrat	19	20
Conservative	16	18
Green	2	3
Independent	0	1
Independent Socialist	1	0
Total	99	99
Working majority	23	15

== Ward results ==
Aireborough
Party	Candidate	Votes	%	±%
Conservative	Makhan Thakur	3,113	44.4	−2.7
Labour	Tony Addison	2,646	37.7	+0.7
Liberal Democrats	Ian Hutton	1,256	17.9	+2.0
Majority		467	6.7	−2.4
Turnout		7,015	37.9	+4.0
Conservative gain from Labour		Swing	-1.7	

Armley
Party	Candidate	Votes	%	±%
Labour	Alison Lowe	2,031	56.0	+5.7
Conservative	Steven Welsh	670	18.5	−6.4
Green	Luke Russell	468	12.9	+5.7
Liberal Democrats	Barbara Thompson	459	12.7	−3.9
Majority		1,361	37.5	+12.1
Turnout		3,628	23.8	+3.1
Labour hold		Swing	+6.0	

Barwick & Kippax
Party	Candidate	Votes	%	±%
Labour	John Parker	3,908	55.8	+5.9
Conservative	Alec Shelbrooke	2,218	31.6	−5.1
Liberal Democrats	Anne Bagnall	607	8.7	−4.7
Green	Elizabeth Holmes	198	2.8	+2.8
Socialist Labour	Paul Dewhirst	77	1.1	+1.1
Majority		1,690	24.2	+9.0
Turnout		7,008	38.3	+7.4
Labour hold		Swing	+5.5	

Beeston
Party	Candidate	Votes	%	±%
Labour	Angela Gabriel	1,763	51.2	+5.4
Conservative	William Birch	1,047	30.4	−3.1
Liberal Democrats	Kathleen Fenton	431	12.5	−5.4
Socialist Alliance	Michael Dear	102	3.0	+3.0
Green	Janet Pritchard	102	3.0	+0.1
Majority		716	20.8	+8.5
Turnout		3,445	28.9	+4.8
Labour hold		Swing	+4.2	

Bramley
Party	Candidate	Votes	%	±%
Labour	Denise Atkinson	2,044	52.7	+13.1
Liberal Democrats	John Burke	1,306	33.7	−12.7
Conservative	Michael Best	368	9.5	−2.0
Green	Colin Avison	160	4.1	+1.7
Majority		738	19.0	+12.2
Turnout		3,878	23.9	+2.9
Labour hold		Swing	+12.9	

Burmantofts
Party	Candidate	Votes	%	±%
Labour	John Garvani	1,608	46.8	−16.2
Liberal Democrats	Ralph Pryke	1,513	44.0	+24.3
Conservative	Patricia Hyde	211	6.1	−7.7
Green	Simon Blanchard	107	3.1	+0.6
Majority		95	2.8	−40.5
Turnout		3,439	27.4	+6.8
Labour hold		Swing	-20.2	

Chapel Allerton
Party	Candidate	Votes	%	±%
Labour	Neil Taggart	2,346	52.6	+5.1
Leeds Left Alliance	Garth Frankland	957	21.4	−2.0
Conservative	Jacqueline Zander	632	14.2	+1.0
Liberal Democrats	Malcolm Silver	527	11.8	−4.1
Majority		1,389	31.2	+7.1
Turnout		4,462	31.4	+0.5
Labour hold		Swing	+3.5	

City & Holbeck
Party	Candidate	Votes	%	±%
Labour	Patrick Davey	1,856	61.6	+5.4
Conservative	Richard Laycock	640	21.2	+2.8
Liberal Democrats	Sitara Khan	317	10.5	−5.2
Socialist	David Jones	201	6.7	+2.1
Majority		1,216	40.4	+2.6
Turnout		3,014	20.0	+2.5
Labour hold		Swing	+1.3	

Cookridge
Party	Candidate	Votes	%	±%
Conservative	John Carter	3,293	53.8	+4.7
Labour	Ian McCargo	1,397	22.8	+2.7
Liberal Democrats	Janet Bates	1,205	19.7	−8.9
Green	Peter Scarth	225	3.7	+1.5
Majority		1,896	31.0	+10.5
Turnout		6,120	37.0	+0.0
Conservative hold		Swing	+1.0	

Garforth & Swillington
Party	Candidate	Votes	%	±%
Labour	Karen Marshall	3,244	51.6	+0.9
Conservative	Robert Semple	1,941	30.9	+0.0
Liberal Democrats	Ian Dowling	1,105	17.6	−0.9
Majority		1,303	20.7	+0.9
Turnout		6,290	33.8	+4.7
Labour hold		Swing	+0.4	

Halton
Party	Candidate	Votes	%	±%
Labour	Lee Benson	2,640	43.4	+3.6
Conservative	David Schofield	2,500	41.1	−6.4
Liberal Democrats	David Hollingsworth	730	12.0	−0.7
Green	Robert Murphy	208	3.4	+3.4
Majority		140	2.3	−5.4
Turnout		6,078	33.9	+2.7
Labour hold		Swing	+5.0	

Harehills
Party	Candidate	Votes	%	±%
Labour	Roger Harrington	2,858	51.8	+9.0
Liberal Democrats	Javaid Akhtar	2,184	39.6	−10.2
BNP	Mark Collett	209	3.8	+3.8
Conservative	Karl Steenson	168	3.0	−1.4
Green	Christopher Hudson	99	1.8	−0.3
Majority		674	12.2	+5.2
Turnout		5,518	40.5	+9.0
Labour gain from Liberal Democrats		Swing	+9.6	

Headingley
Party	Candidate	Votes	%	±%
Liberal Democrats	Martin Hamilton	1,885	48.7	+6.8
Labour	Doreen Illingworth	1,154	29.8	−7.7
Green	Lesley Jeffries	390	10.1	−0.5
Conservative	Daniel Riley	289	7.5	−2.5
Socialist Alliance	Katherine Owen	156	4.0	+4.0
Majority		731	18.9	+14.5
Turnout		3,874	18.8	+2.5
Liberal Democrats gain from Labour		Swing	+7.2	

Horsforth
Party	Candidate	Votes	%	±%
Liberal Democrats	Christopher Townsley	2,764	44.2	+4.4
Conservative	Richard Hardcastle	2,145	34.3	−2.3
Labour	Ted Hanley	1,110	17.8	−2.7
Green	Andrea Binns	230	3.7	+0.6
Majority		619	9.9	+6.7
Turnout		6,249	36.0	+3.8
Liberal Democrats hold		Swing	+3.3	

Hunslet
Party	Candidate	Votes	%	±%
Labour	Judith Blake	1,535	68.2	−2.3
Liberal Democrats	James Graham	304	13.5	−9.9
Conservative	Anthony Larvin	279	12.4	+12.4
Green	Francis Gray	86	3.8	−2.3
Socialist Alliance	James Jackson	47	2.1	+2.1
Majority		1,231	54.7	+7.6
Turnout		2,251	20.6	+2.7
Labour gain from Independent Socialist		Swing	+3.8	

Kirkstall
Party	Candidate	Votes	%	±%
Labour	Bernard Atha	2,142	57.6	−3.2
Liberal Democrats	Natasha De Vere	587	15.8	+1.9
Conservative	Ian Richmond	508	13.7	−3.8
Green	Martin Reed	480	12.9	+5.1
Majority		1,555	41.8	−1.5
Turnout		3,717	25.0	+3.1
Labour hold		Swing	-2.5	

Middleton
Party	Candidate	Votes	%	±%
Labour	David Langham	2,052	63.6	+4.4
Conservative	Robert Allen	567	17.6	−8.6
Liberal Democrats	Sadie Fisher	422	13.1	+1.4
Green	Patricia Capstick	183	5.7	+2.9
Majority		1,485	46.0	+13.0
Turnout		3,224	21.7	+3.0
Labour hold		Swing	+6.5	

Moortown
Party	Candidate	Votes	%	±%
Liberal Democrats	Brenda Lancaster	3,132	55.2	+5.4
Labour	Barry Young	1,500	26.5	+1.6
Conservative	Christopher Ingoldby	907	16.0	−5.6
Leeds Left Alliance	Michael Davies	130	2.3	+1.0
Majority		1,632	28.7	+3.8
Turnout		5,669	35.3	+0.7
Liberal Democrats hold		Swing	+1.9	

Morley North
Party	Candidate	Votes	%	±%
Independent	Robert Finnigan	2,228	37.8	+37.8
Labour	Graham Platt	1,762	29.9	−14.0
Conservative	Keely Jamieson	1,351	22.9	−17.9
Liberal Democrats	Christine Golton	405	6.9	−3.9
Green	Irene Dracup	150	2.5	−2.0
Majority		466	7.9	+4.8
Turnout		5,896	30.5	+4.5
Independent gain from Labour		Swing	+25.9	

Morley South
Party	Candidate	Votes	%	±%
Labour	Sherry Bradley	2,631	53.2	+2.0
Conservative	David Boynton	1,433	29.0	−2.7
Liberal Democrats	Rochelle Harris	880	17.8	+4.5
Majority		1,198	24.2	+4.7
Turnout		4,944	22.4	+2.3
Labour hold		Swing	+2.3	

North
Party	Candidate	Votes	%	±%
Conservative	Ronnie Feldman	2,996	45.7	+5.6
Liberal Democrats	Judith Chapman	2,312	35.3	−8.0
Labour	Debra Coupar	1,193	18.2	+3.7
Leeds Left Alliance	Brian Jackson	51	0.8	+0.3
Majority		684	10.4	+7.1
Turnout		6,552	38.8	+3.1
Conservative hold		Swing	+6.8	

Otley & Wharfedale
Party	Candidate	Votes	%	±%
Conservative	Nigel Francis	3,420	44.2	+6.7
Labour	John Eveleigh	2,268	29.3	+5.5
Liberal Democrats	James Hoskins	1,793	23.2	−4.0
Green	Paul Marchant	262	3.4	+1.5
Majority		1,152	14.9	+4.6
Turnout		7,743	40.8	+2.2
Conservative gain from Labour		Swing	+0.6	

Pudsey North
Party	Candidate	Votes	%	±%
Conservative	Frank Robinson	3,505	52.1	−14.0
Labour	Michael King	2,167	32.2	+8.9
Liberal Democrats	Christine Wilson	832	12.4	+1.8
Green	Susan Turnbull	220	3.3	+3.3
Majority		1,338	19.9	−22.9
Turnout		6,724	37.7	+3.2
Conservative hold		Swing	-11.4	

Pudsey South
Party	Candidate	Votes	%	±%
Labour	Richard Lewis	2,699	48.1	+4.2
Conservative	Helen Widdas	2,027	36.2	−4.4
Liberal Democrats	Christine Glover	648	11.6	−0.9
Green	Yvonne Clarke	233	4.2	+1.2
Majority		672	11.9	+8.6
Turnout		5,607	33.3	+6.2
Labour hold		Swing	+4.3	

Richmond Hill
Party	Candidate	Votes	%	±%
Labour	Eamonn McGee	1,839	71.1	+3.8
Liberal Democrats	Keith Norman	406	15.7	+0.7
Conservative	Michael Wheeler	255	9.9	−2.5
Socialist Alliance	Steven Skinner	87	3.4	+3.4
Majority		1,433	55.4	+3.1
Turnout		2,587	26.9	+7.0
Labour hold		Swing	+1.5	

Rothwell
Party	Candidate	Votes	%	±%
Liberal Democrats	Keith Willey	2,658	48.2	+3.3
Labour	Alec Hudson	2,253	40.8	+1.8
Conservative	John Cowling	606	11.0	−5.1
Majority		405	7.4	+1.5
Turnout		5,517	34.1	+6.0
Liberal Democrats gain from Labour		Swing	+0.7	

Roundhay
Party	Candidate	Votes	%	±%
Conservative	Peter Harrand	2,675	41.0	−3.3
Labour	Irene O'Grady	2,586	39.7	−0.8
Liberal Democrats	John Skinner	900	13.8	+2.7
Green	Colin Johnston	233	3.6	+1.0
Leeds Left Alliance	Malcolm Christie	127	1.9	+0.4
Majority		89	1.3	−2.5
Turnout		6,521	39.3	+1.5
Conservative hold		Swing	-1.2	

Seacroft
Party	Candidate	Votes	%	±%
Labour	Michael Davey	2,197	80.2	+6.5
Liberal Democrats	Pauline Davies	502	18.3	+10.0
Conservative	Donald Townsley	42	1.5	−11.2
Majority		1,695	61.9	+0.9
Turnout		2,741	23.5	+1.1
Labour hold		Swing	-1.7	

University
Party	Candidate	Votes	%	±%
Labour	Patrick Hall	1,447	56.9	−2.7
Liberal Democrats	Arif Hussain	514	20.2	+2.7
Conservative	Robert Winfield	345	13.6	+2.0
Green	Bluebell Eikonoklastes	235	9.2	+0.4
Majority		933	36.7	−5.4
Turnout		2,541	16.6	+2.2
Labour hold		Swing	-2.7	

Weetwood
Party	Candidate	Votes	%	±%
Liberal Democrats	Stewart Golton	2,515	44.7	+4.0
Labour	Alex Sobel	1,780	31.7	−4.6
Conservative	Graham Castle	985	17.5	−1.3
Green	David Webb	343	6.1	+1.9
Majority		735	13.0	+8.6
Turnout		5,623	34.4	+0.4
Liberal Democrats hold		Swing	+4.3	

Wetherby
Party	Candidate	Votes	%	±%
Conservative	John Procter	4,940	66.0	−2.7
Labour	James Lewis	1,581	21.1	+2.0
Liberal Democrats	Edmund Conybeare	960	12.8	+0.6
Majority		3,359	44.9	−4.7
Turnout		7,481	36.6	+2.6
Conservative hold		Swing	-2.3	

Whinmoor
Party	Candidate	Votes	%	±%
Labour	Pauleen Grahame	2,211	54.5	+4.4
Conservative	Valerie Kendall	1,370	33.8	−3.9
Liberal Democrats	Michael Welby	473	11.7	−0.5
Majority		841	20.7	+8.3
Turnout		4,054	32.3	+6.1
Labour hold		Swing	+4.1	

Wortley
Party	Candidate	Votes	%	±%
Green	Ann Blackburn	2,720	54.0	−1.5
Labour	Malcolm Bedford	1,601	31.8	+3.8
Conservative	Glenn Broadbent	501	9.9	−2.4
Liberal Democrats	John Ewens	217	4.3	+0.1
Majority		1,119	22.2	−5.3
Turnout		5,039	29.7	+1.6
Green gain from Labour		Swing	-2.6	
