= Thomas Nossiter =

English economist (1937–2004)

Tom Nossiter
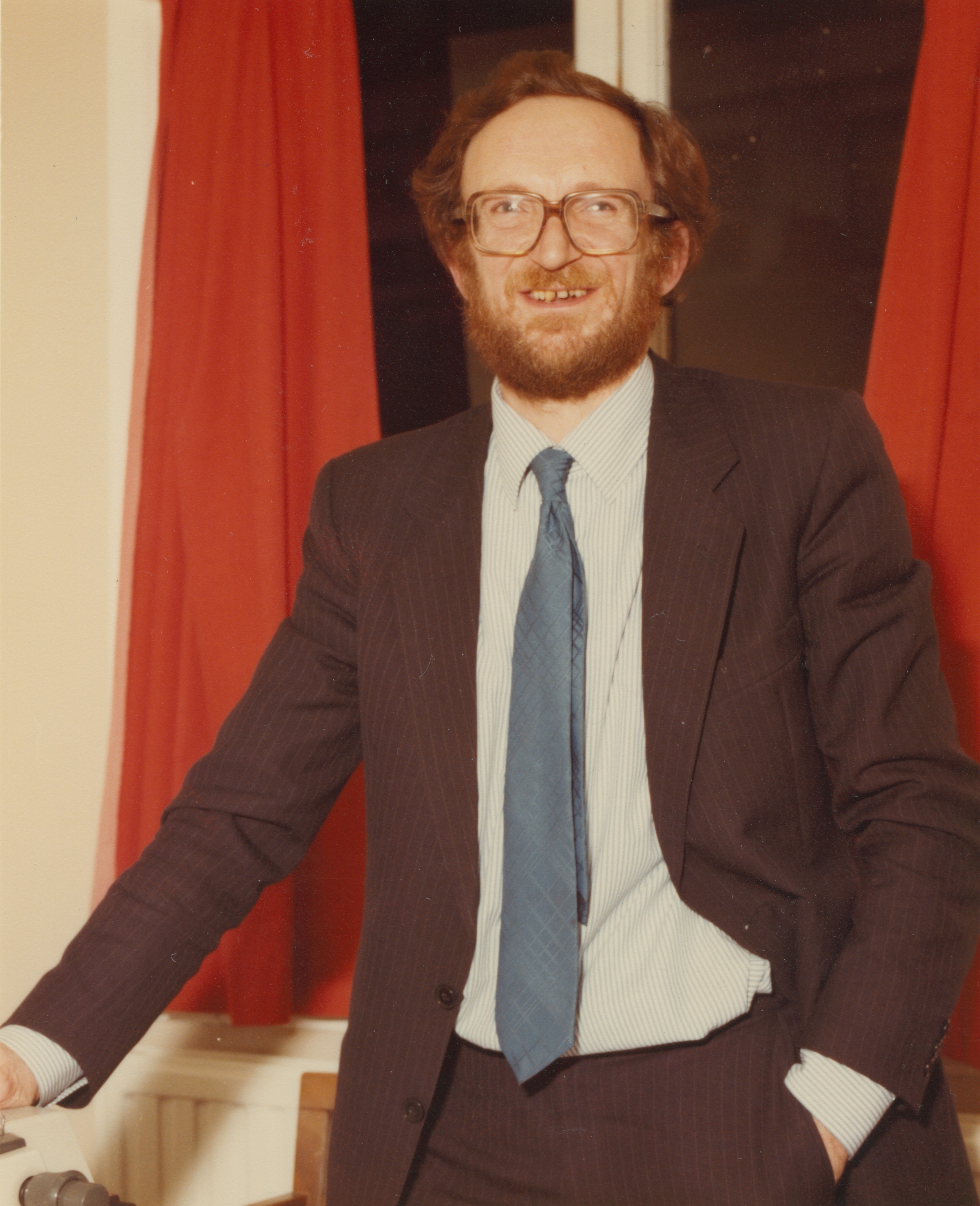

Leeds City Councillor for Horsforth Ward
- In office 7 May 1999 – 1999
- Preceded by: Roger Harris
- Succeeded by: Andrew Barker

Personal details
- Born: 24 December 1937 Stockton-on-Tees, England
- Died: 12 January 2004 (aged 66)
- Party: Liberal Democrats

Thomas Johnson Nossiter (24 December 1937 – 12 January 2004) was Professor of Government at the London School of Economics from 1989 until 1994.

== Early life ==
Nossiter was the son of Alfred and Margaret (née Hume) Nossiter. He was educated at Stockton Grammar School.

He did National Service in the Royal Corps of Signals between 1956 and 1958.

Nossiter completed his higher education at the University of Oxford, as an undergraduate at Exeter College and a graduate at Nuffield. He took the degrees of Bachelor of Arts, Master of Arts, and Doctor of Philosophy. His thesis, completed under the auspices of the Faculty of Modern History and submitted in 1968, was entitled, Elections and political behaviour in County Durham and Newcastle, 1832-74.

== Academic career ==
For the rest of his life, Nossiter studied and lectured in political sociology.

In 1964 he was appointed Lecturer in Social Studies at the University of Leeds. He continued to live in Leeds throughout the time during which he was working in London. He was first appointed to the London School of Economics in 1973 and for more than twenty years he taught an entire generation of students in the Government department. His work on Communism in Kerala was influential on later scholarship. His numerous PhD students included Vir K. Chopra.

He went on to hold the positions of

- Senior Lecturer (1977–83)
- Chairman of Examiners University of London External Programme BSc (1980)
- Chairman of the Working Party on Revision of the External BSc (1983)
- Reader (1983–87), chairman of the Board of Studies in Economics (1984–85)
- Dean of the Graduate School (1986–89), Academic Governor (1988–92)
- Professor of Government (1989–94)
- Professor Emeritus (appointed for life in 1996)

== Other aspects of his life ==
Nossiter was an advocate of adult education, both at home and further afield. In 1991 he was appointed an Honorary Citizen of Trá Lí (Tralee), Contae Chiarraí (County Kerry) in recognition of his endeavours in the field. His obituary noted that "he had touched thousands of lives in rural India".

In 1999 he was elected a Councillor on Leeds City Council for the Liberal Democrats. He resigned after six months in office representing Horsforth ward.

== Publications ==
=== Sole-authored books ===
- Influence, opinion and political idioms in reformed England: case studies from the north-east, 1832-74 (Hassocks, 1975)
- Communism in Kerala: A Study in Political Adaptation (Berkeley: University of California Press, 1982)
- Marxist state governments in India: politics, economics and society (London: Pinter, 1988)

==== Administrative guide ====
- BSc (Economics) Degree. Government, parts I/II (University of London External Advisory Service Subject Guide, London: University of London, 1989)

=== Edited ===
- Broadcasting Finance in Transition with Blumler, Jay G. (Oxford: Oxford University Press, 1991)
- The letters of Alastair Hetherington (Editor of The Guardian 1958-75) British Library of Economic and Political Science 1997.
- Imagination and precision in the social sciences: essays in memory of Peter Nettl with A.H. Hanson and Stein R. Rokkan (London: Faber, 1972)

== Sources and external Links ==
- Debrett's People of Today (12th edn, London: Debrett's Peerage, 1999), pp. 1455-6
