= 1988 Leeds City Council election =

1988 UK local government election

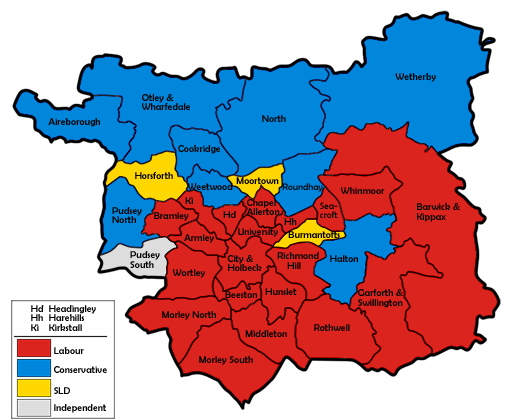
Map of the results for the 1988 Leeds council election.

The 1988 Leeds City Council elections were held on Thursday, 5 May 1988, with one third of the council and a vacancy in Headingley to be elected.

Following national patterns, the newly merged Social and Liberal Democrats, seen a substantial fall in vote to their lowest share in a decade, with former candidates standing against them as SDP in opposition to the merger. The SLD collapse was largely uniform, mostly transferring to Labour, except in northern wards – where support tended to disperse between the main parties and any minor candidate standing (usually Green or the aforementioned breakaway SDP) – or wards in which Independents stood. Importantly for the SLD, their support in the three wards they were defending notably withstood that collapse, although hopes of retaking Armley after their councillor turned Independent were dashed by large swings away to allow a Labour gain there (with Michael Meadowcroft later alleging racist campaigning by Labour). Elsewhere, the incumbent Independent in Pudsey South was comfortably re-elected, tripling his majority there. As the chief recipient of lost SLD support, Labour won their highest share of vote since the council's inception in 1973, and their greatest vote and majority on the council since 1980's re-warding.

== Election result ==
Leeds local election result 1988
Party	Seats	Gains	Losses	Net gain/loss	Seats %	Votes %	Votes	+/−
Labour	21	1	0	+1	61.8	46.2	94,347	+8.1
Conservative	9	0	0	0	26.5	33.0	67,550	-0.1
SLD	3	0	0	0	8.8	17.1	35,033	-11.2
Independent	1	0	1	-1	2.9	1.8	3,600	+1.7
SDP	0	0	0	0	0.0	0.9	1,894	+0.9
Green	0	0	0	0	0.0	0.8	1,549	+0.5
Communist	0	0	0	0	0.0	0.2	414	+0.1

This result has the following consequences for the total number of seats on the council after the elections:

Party	Previous council	New council
Labour	58	59
Conservative	25	25
SLD	14	14
Independent	2	1
Total	99	99
Working majority	17	19

== Ward results ==
Aireborough
Party	Candidate	Votes	%	±%
Conservative	R. Hughes-Rowlands	3,096	43.8	+6.9
Labour	M. Dunn	2,211	31.2	+11.8
SLD	S. Denby	1,769	25.0	−18.7
Majority		885	12.5	+5.7
Turnout		7,076		
Conservative hold		Swing	-2.4	

Armley
Party	Candidate	Votes	%	±%
Labour	James McKenna	3,312	55.0	+18.8
SLD	Mohammed Riasat	1,688	28.0	−17.7
Conservative	P. Netzel	1,026	17.0	−1.0
Majority		1,624	26.9	+17.3
Turnout		6,026		
Labour gain from Independent		Swing	+18.2	

Barwick & Kippax
Party	Candidate	Votes	%	±%
Labour	Keith Sturgess	4,381	58.8	+7.0
Conservative	B. Caro	2,616	35.1	+1.8
SLD	R. Hutchinson	448	6.0	−8.8
Majority		1,765	23.7	+5.2
Turnout		7,445		
Labour hold		Swing	+2.6	

Beeston
Party	Candidate	Votes	%	±%
Labour	A. Beevers	2,949	67.9	+12.8
Conservative	H. Woodhead	1,083	24.9	−2.7
SLD	K. Lee	270	6.2	−11.1
Communist	W. Innes	44	1.0	+1.0
Majority		1,866	42.9	+15.5
Turnout		4,346		
Labour hold		Swing	+7.7	

Bramley
Party	Candidate	Votes	%	±%
Labour	C. Cliff	3,539	68.8	+13.2
Conservative	H. Hinchcliffe	861	16.7	−1.8
SLD	M. Tones	747	14.5	−11.4
Majority		2,678	52.0	+22.3
Turnout		5,147		
Labour hold		Swing	+7.5	

Burmantofts
Party	Candidate	Votes	%	±%
SLD	N. Mackie	3,044	49.5	+0.9
Labour	J. Lister	2,728	44.4	+0.1
Conservative	J. Galbraith	378	6.1	−1.1
Majority		316	5.1	+0.8
Turnout		6,150		
SLD hold		Swing	+0.4	

Chapel Allerton
Party	Candidate	Votes	%	±%
Labour	J. Frankland	3,795	65.4	+7.0
Conservative	I. Baxter	1,388	23.9	−1.7
SLD	J. Levy	301	5.2	−10.9
Green	S. Needham	165	2.8	+2.8
SDP	S. Cohen	158	2.7	+2.7
Majority		2,407	41.4	+8.6
Turnout		5,807		
Labour hold		Swing	+4.3	

City & Holbeck
Party	Candidate	Votes	%	±%
Labour	R. Glassford	3,389	77.0	+11.9
Conservative	D. Boynton	677	15.4	−0.7
SLD	D. Hollingsworth	336	7.6	−11.2
Majority		2,712	61.6	+15.3
Turnout		4,402		
Labour hold		Swing	+6.3	

Cookridge
Party	Candidate	Votes	%	±%
Conservative	K. Loudon	4,084	60.3	+7.6
Labour	A. Procter	1,563	23.1	+7.9
SLD	J. Hall	760	11.2	−20.8
SDP	M. Bray	367	5.4	+5.4
Majority		2,521	37.2	+16.5
Turnout		6,774		
Conservative hold		Swing	-0.1	

Garforth & Swillington
Party	Candidate	Votes	%	±%
Labour	G. Moakes	4,692	57.5	+13.2
Conservative	M. Stelling	2,954	36.2	−0.5
SLD	G. Roberts	517	6.3	−12.7
Majority		1,738	21.3	+13.7
Turnout		8,163		
Labour hold		Swing	+6.8	

Halton
Party	Candidate	Votes	%	±%
Conservative	D. Townsley	3,399	54.6	−0.5
Labour	S. Butterfield	2,102	33.7	+10.5
SLD	T. Ayres	729	11.7	−10.0
Majority		1,297	20.8	−11.1
Turnout		6,230		
Conservative hold		Swing	-5.5	

Harehills
Party	Candidate	Votes	%	±%
Labour	L. Cohen	3,525	65.5	+15.3
SLD	C. Holden	1,029	19.1	−19.3
Conservative	R. Richardson	830	15.4	+4.1
Majority		2,496	46.4	+34.6
Turnout		5,384		
Labour hold		Swing	+17.3	

Headingley
Party	Candidate	Votes	%	±%
Labour	J. Page	2,828	41.8	+0.9
Labour	K. Nathan	2,822		
SLD	C. Shaw	2,032	30.1	−6.6
SLD	E. Low	1,756		
Conservative	G. Castle	1,042	15.4	−0.8
Conservative	J. Montague	1,001		
Green	C. Nash	640	9.5	+4.1
Communist	B. Cooper	216	3.2	+2.4
Majority		796	11.8	+7.6
Turnout		6,758		
Labour hold		Swing		
Labour hold		Swing	+3.8	

Horsforth
Party	Candidate	Votes	%	±%
SLD	S. Cooksey	3,432	44.5	+0.4
Conservative	J. Cason	3,087	40.0	−1.2
Labour	A. Radford	1,192	15.5	+0.9
Majority		345	4.5	+1.6
Turnout		7,711		
SLD hold		Swing	+0.8	

Hunslet
Party	Candidate	Votes	%	±%
Labour	G. Driver	3,011	77.8	−1.8
Conservative	A. Larvin	407	10.5	+0.4
Independent	L. Parrish	308	8.0	+8.0
SLD	C. Lunn	142	3.7	−6.6
Majority		2,604	67.3	−2.1
Turnout		3,868		
Labour hold		Swing	-1.1	

Kirkstall
Party	Candidate	Votes	%	±%
Labour	E. St. David-Smith	3,707	66.5	+13.6
Conservative	C. Mollitt	1,061	19.0	−1.2
SLD	J. Brophy	810	14.5	−12.4
Majority		2,646	47.4	+21.5
Turnout		5,578		
Labour hold		Swing	+7.4	

Middleton
Party	Candidate	Votes	%	±%
Labour	F. Dignan	3,126	77.4	+10.2
Conservative	A. Dufton	642	15.9	−0.7
SLD	T. Garbett	273	6.8	−5.5
Majority		2,484	61.5	+10.9
Turnout		4,041		
Labour hold		Swing	+5.4	

Moortown
Party	Candidate	Votes	%	±%
SLD	M. Harris	3,814	47.6	+1.2
Conservative	V. Kendall	2,729	34.1	−2.5
Labour	A. Hollas	1,470	18.3	+1.4
Majority		1,085	13.5	+3.7
Turnout		8,013		
SLD hold		Swing	+1.8	

Morley North
Party	Candidate	Votes	%	±%
Labour	P. Jones	3,552	50.8	+11.4
Conservative	E. Reddyhoff	2,767	39.6	−5.9
SDP	L. Jagger	313	4.9	+4.9
SLD	P. Haywood	329	4.7	−10.5
Majority		785	11.2	+5.1
Turnout		6,991		
Labour hold		Swing	+8.6	

Morley South
Party	Candidate	Votes	%	±%
Labour	B. North	3,915	63.5	+13.7
Conservative	R. Senior	1,807	29.3	−4.8
SLD	T. Leadley	441	7.2	−9.0
Majority		2,108	34.2	+18.5
Turnout		6,163		
Labour hold		Swing	+9.2	

North
Party	Candidate	Votes	%	±%
Conservative	S. Morris	3,593	57.6	+6.5
Labour	E. Moxon	1,476	23.7	+12.8
SLD	M. Gregory	854	13.7	−24.3
SDP	P. Rogers	313	5.0	+5.0
Majority		2,117	33.9	+20.8
Turnout		6,236		
Conservative hold		Swing	-3.1	

Otley & Wharfedale
Party	Candidate	Votes	%	±%
Conservative	C. Hindle	4,343	46.6	+6.1
SLD	M. Coles	3,232	34.7	−9.4
Labour	S. Egan	1,261	13.5	+0.5
SDP	J. Cusworth	253	2.7	+2.7
Green	A. Stevens	226	2.4	+0.1
Majority		1,111	11.9	+8.3
Turnout		9,315		
Conservative hold		Swing	-7.7	

Pudsey North
Party	Candidate	Votes	%	±%
Conservative	A. Carter	3,968	51.7	+7.7
Labour	B. Dale	2,260	29.4	+4.8
SLD	C. Garner	1,450	18.9	−12.5
Majority		1,708	22.2	+9.7
Turnout		7,678		
Conservative hold		Swing	+1.4	

Pudsey South
Party	Candidate	Votes	%	±%
Independent	P. Kersting	3,292	46.4	+46.4
Labour	A. Jarosz	2,102	29.6	−9.4
Conservative	D. Ballinger	1,487	21.0	−15.5
SLD	B. Selby	214	3.0	−21.5
Majority		1,190	16.8	+14.2
Turnout		7,095		
Independent hold		Swing	+27.9	

Richmond Hill
Party	Candidate	Votes	%	±%
Labour	M. Lyons	3,863	79.1	+13.4
Conservative	W. Birch	544	11.1	−1.8
SLD	K. Norman	474	9.7	−11.6
Majority		3,319	68.0	+23.5
Turnout		4,881		
Labour hold		Swing	+7.6	

Rothwell
Party	Candidate	Votes	%	±%
Labour	R. Lund	3,829	66.5	+8.3
Conservative	A. Heeson	1,495	26.0	−2.4
SLD	M. Galdas	433	7.5	−5.8
Majority		2,334	40.5	+10.7
Turnout		5,757		
Labour hold		Swing	+5.3	

Roundhay
Party	Candidate	Votes	%	±%
Conservative	P. Crotty	3,862	56.8	+2.4
Labour	K. Prior	1,674	24.6	+5.8
SLD	S. Holland	963	14.2	−12.7
Green	P. Ellis	305	4.5	+4.5
Majority		2,188	32.2	+4.7
Turnout		6,804		
Conservative hold		Swing	-1.7	

Seacroft
Party	Candidate	Votes	%	±%
Labour	George Mudie	3,594	81.3	+16.2
Conservative	R. Negus	599	13.5	−2.8
SLD	R. Senior	229	5.2	−13.4
Majority		2,995	67.7	+21.3
Turnout		4,422		
Labour hold		Swing	+9.5	

University
Party	Candidate	Votes	%	±%
Labour	W. Kilgallon	3,253	74.9	+11.1
Conservative	J. Leng	597	13.7	−2.0
SLD	R. Mundell	341	7.8	−9.4
Communist	R. Honey	154	3.5	+0.3
Majority		2,656	61.1	+14.7
Turnout		4,345		
Labour hold		Swing	+6.5	

Weetwood
Party	Candidate	Votes	%	±%
Conservative	A. Castle	2,881	42.5	+0.6
Labour	P. Hall	1,990	29.4	+2.3
SLD	J. Ewens	1,692	25.0	−4.1
Green	G. Rainford	213	3.1	+1.1
Majority		891	13.1	+0.3
Turnout		6,776		
Conservative hold		Swing	-0.8	

Wetherby
Party	Candidate	Votes	%	±%
Conservative	H. Gardiner	4,844	67.0	+5.3
Labour	J. Postill	1,161	16.1	+3.7
SLD	T. Burgess	764	10.6	−15.3
SDP	H. Westbrook	460	6.4	+6.4
Majority		3,683	50.9	+15.1
Turnout		7,229		
Conservative hold		Swing	+0.8	

Whinmoor
Party	Candidate	Votes	%	±%
Labour	S. Armitage	3,128	57.3	+6.0
Conservative	M. Silversides	1,991	36.5	+2.9
SLD	N. Snowdon	340	6.2	−8.8
Majority		1,137	20.8	+3.1
Turnout		5,459		
Labour hold		Swing	+1.5	

Wortley
Party	Candidate	Votes	%	±%
Labour	P. Towler	3,769	59.7	+17.0
Conservative	B. Nicol	1,412	22.4	+0.5
SLD	L. Thackray	1,136	18.0	−17.5
Majority		2,357	37.3	+30.1
Turnout		6,317		
Labour hold		Swing	+8.2	

== By-elections between 1988 and 1990 ==
Armley by-election 8 December 1988 replacing David Selby (resigned)
Party	Candidate	Votes	%	±%
Labour	Paul Paley	1,580	46.4	−8.6
SLD		1,110	32.6	+4.6
Conservative		662	19.4	+2.4
SDP		53	1.5	+1.5
Majority		470	13.8	−13.1
Turnout		3,405	21.3	−16.4
Labour gain from SLD		Swing	-6.6	

Double by-election, Horsforth, 8 June 1989 replacing S.J. Cooksey and B. Rich
Party	Candidate	Votes	%	±%
SLD	Andrew McCaig	2,658		
SLD	John Meade	2,625		
Conservative	June Casson	2,374		
Conservative	Rodney Cam (Con)	2,273		
Labour	Brian Dale (Lab)	886		
Labour	Alan Radford (Lab)	959		

Burmantofts by-election 15th June 1989 replacing Margaret Clay
Party	Candidate	Votes	%	±%
Labour	Sydney Butterfield	3,226	53.3	+8.9
SLD		2,356	39.0	−10.5
Conservative		465	7.7	+1.6
Majority		870	14.3	+9.2
Turnout		6,047	44.0	−0.7
Labour gain from SLD		Swing	+9.7	

Morley North by-election 15th June 1989 replacing Philippa Fitzpatrick
Party	Candidate	Votes	%	±%
Labour	Francis Jones	3,617	48.7	−2.1
Conservative		2,747	37.0	−2.6
Green		614	8.3	+8.3
SLD		444	6.0	+1.3
Majority		870	11.7	+0.5
Turnout		7,422	42.0	+2.5
Labour hold		Swing	+0.2	

City & Holbeck by-election 30th November 1989 replacing Roy Glassford
Party	Candidate	Votes	%	±%
Labour	Elizabeth Nash	1,982	80.2	+3.2
Conservative		254	10.3	−5.1
SLD		234	9.5	+1.9
Majority		1,728	69.9	+8.3
Turnout		2,470		
Labour hold		Swing	+4.1	
