= Horsforth (ward) =

Electoral ward in Leeds, England

- Horsforth highlighted within Leeds
- Population: 17,917 (2023 electorate)
- Metropolitan borough: City of Leeds
- Metropolitan county: West Yorkshire
- Region: Yorkshire and the Humber
- Country: England
- Sovereign state: United Kingdom
- UK Parliament: Leeds North West
- Councillors: Emmie Bromley (Labour); John Garvani (Labour); Raymond Jones (Labour)

Horsforth is an electoral ward of Leeds City Council in north west Leeds, West Yorkshire, covering the suburb of the same name and a southern part of Rawdon.

== Boundaries ==
The Horsforth ward includes the civil parish of the same name, also overseen by Horsforth Town Council.

== Councillors ==
Election	Councillor	Councillor	Councillor
1973	Morris Crossfield (Lib)	R. Morrish (Lib)	H. Stuttard (Lib)
1975	Morris Crossfield (Lib)	R. Morrish (Lib)	M. Frame (Con)
1976	Morris Crossfield (Lib)	A. Foyston (Con)	M. Frame (Con)
1978	Morris Crossfield (Lib)	A. Foyston (Con)	M. Frame (Con)
By-election	Morris Crossfield (Lib)	Unknown (Con)	M. Frame (Con)
1979	Morris Crossfield (Lib)	Unknown (Con)	R. Howe (Lib)
1980	Morris Crossfield (Lib)	S.J. Cooksey (Lib)	Valerie Stephens (Con)
1982	Morris Crossfield (Lib)	S.J. Cooksey (Lib)	Julian Cummins (Lib)
1983	Valerie Stephens (Con)	S.J. Cooksey (Lib)	Julian Cummins (Lib)
1984	Valerie Stephens (Con)	S.J. Cooksey (Lib)	Julian Cummins (Lib)
1986	Valerie Stephens (Con)	S.J. Cooksey (Lib)	Julian Cummins (Lib)
1987	B. Rich (Lib)	S.J. Cooksey (Lib)	Julian Cummins (Lib)
1988	B. Rich (SLD)	S.J. Cooksey (SLD)	Julian Cummins (SLD)
1989 by-election	John Meade (SLD)	Andrew McCaig (SLD)	Julian Cummins (SLD)
1990	John Meade (LD)	Andrew McCaig (LD)	Michael Shaw (LD) (Note: Incumbent Cummins' "business commitments forced him to stand down".)
1991	John Meade (LD)	Christopher Townsley (LD)	Michael Shaw (LD)
1992	John Meade (LD)	Mary Addison (Con)	Michael Shaw (LD)
1994	John Meade (LD)	Mary Addison (Con)	Christopher Townsley (LD)
1995	Brian Cleasby (LD)	Mary Addison (Con)	Christopher Townsley (LD)
1996	Brian Cleasby (LD)	Roger Harris (LD)	Christopher Townsley (LD)
1998	Brian Cleasby (LD)	Roger Harris (LD)	Christopher Townsley (LD)
1999	Brian Cleasby (LD)	Tom Nossiter (LD) (Note: Nossiter resigned six months into taking up his seat on the council. His seat was up for re-election at the next election in 2000.)	Christopher Townsley (LD)
2000	Brian Cleasby (LD)	Andrew Barker (LD)	Christopher Townsley (LD)
2002	Brian Cleasby (LD)	Andrew Barker (LD)	Christopher Townsley (LD)
2003	Brian Cleasby (LD)	Andrew Barker (LD)	Christopher Townsley (LD)
2004	Brian Cleasby (LD)	Andrew Barker (LD)	Christopher Townsley (LD)
2006	Brian Cleasby (LD)	Andrew Barker (LD)	Christopher Townsley (LD)
2007	Brian Cleasby (LD)	Andrew Barker (LD)	Christopher Townsley (LD)
2008	Brian Cleasby (LD)	Andrew Barker (LD)	Christopher Townsley (LD)
2010	Brian Cleasby (LD)	Andrew Barker (LD)	Christopher Townsley (LD)
2011	Brian Cleasby (LD)	Dawn Collins (Con)	Christopher Townsley (LD)
2012	Brian Cleasby (LD)	Dawn Collins (Con)	Christopher Townsley (LD)
2014	Brian Cleasby (LD)	Dawn Collins (Con)	Christopher Townsley (LD)
2015	Brian Cleasby (LD)	Dawn Collins (Con)	Christopher Townsley (LD)
2016	Brian Cleasby (LD)	Dawn Collins (Con)	Christopher Townsley (LD)
2018	Jonathon Taylor (Con)	Dawn Collins (Con)	Jackie Shemilt (Con)
2019	Jonathon Taylor (Con)	Dawn Collins (Con)	Jackie Shemilt (Con)
2021	Jonathon Taylor (Con) (Note: Taylor resigned his office on 15 March 2022 to take up a "politically restricted role". His successor was elected on the same day as the next council election on 5 May.)	Dawn Collins (Con)	Jackie Shemilt (Con)
2022	John Garvani (Lab) (Note: Garvani served as a councillor for Burmantofts ward from 2002 to 2004, when he failed to be re-elected when standing in Gipton and Harehills instead.)	Emmie Bromley (Lab)	Jackie Shemilt (Con)
2023	John Garvani (Lab)	Emmie Bromley (Lab)	Raymond Jones (Lab)
2024	John Garvani (Lab)	Emmie Bromley (Lab)	Raymond Jones (Lab)
2026	John Garvani* (Lab)	Emmie Bromley* (Lab)	Raymond Jones* (Lab)

indicates seat up for re-election. indicates seat up for election following resignation or death of sitting councillor. * indicates incumbent councillor.

== Elections since 2010 ==
=== May 2026 ===
2026
Party	Candidate	Votes	%	±%
Labour	Emmie Bromley*	3,018	34.1	−22.5
Conservative	Chris Calvert	2,063	23.3	−2.1
Green	Khadijah Akhtar	1,719	19.4	+12.1
Reform	Michael Meston	1,450	16.4	New
Liberal Democrats	Ivan Brookes	570	6.4	+1.7
SDP	Catherine Dobson	25	0.3	−0.2
Majority		955	11.8	−19.4
Turnout		8,845	49.3	+5.5
Labour hold		Swing		

=== May 2024 ===
2024
Party	Candidate	Votes	%	±%
Labour	John Garvani*	4,388	56.6	+5.2
Conservative	Chris Calvert	1,971	25.4	−5.6
Green	William Jones	565	7.3	−0.5
Yorkshire	Ian Cowling	414	5.3	+2.1
Liberal Democrats	Roderic Parker	367	4.7	−1.8
SDP	Nathan Wright	41	0.5	New
Majority		2,417	31.2	+11.0
Turnout		7,776	43.8	+2.2
Labour hold		Swing		

=== May 2023 ===
2023
Party	Candidate	Votes	%	±%
Labour	Raymond Jones	3,810	51.4	+6.7
Conservative	Jackie Shemilt*	2,302	31.0	−4.2
Green	Ian Shaw (Note: The vote increase shown is the change from the highest-placed Green Party candidate (Gideon Jones) in 2022. Ian Shaw increased his personal share of the vote by 3.5%.)	581	7.8	+0.3
Liberal Democrats	James Spencer	483	6.5	−10.5
Yorkshire	Ian Cowling	241	3.2	−1.1
Majority		1,508	20.2	+10.6
Turnout		7,448	41.6	−0.7
Labour gain from Conservative		Swing		

=== May 2022 ===
2022
Party	Candidate	Votes	%	±%
Labour	Emmie Bromley	3,402	44.7	+14.0
Labour	John Garvani	3,166	41.6	+10.9
Conservative	Dawn Collins*	2,673	35.2	−3.1
Conservative	Tracy Stones	2,492	32.8	−5.5
Liberal Democrats	Simon Dowling	1,292	17.0	−3.4
Liberal Democrats	Becky Heaviside	974	12.8	−7.6
Green	Gideon Jones	569	7.5	+0.4
Green	Ian Shaw	330	4.3	−2.8
Yorkshire	Ian Cowling	330	4.3	+1.8
Majority		729	9.6	+2.1
Turnout		7,603	42.3	−5.5
Labour gain from Conservative		Swing		
Labour gain from Conservative		Swing		

=== May 2021 ===
2021
Party	Candidate	Votes	%	±%
Conservative	Jonathon Taylor*	3,292	38.3	+0.9
Labour	John Garvani	2,642	30.7	+4.0
Liberal Democrats	Simon Dowling	1,750	20.4	+1.3
Green	William Jones	609	7.1	−4.8
Yorkshire	Roland Gilmore	219	2.5	N/A
Freedom Alliance. No Lockdowns. No Curfews.	Anne Mutch	45	0.1	N/A
Majority		650	7.5	−3.2
Turnout		8,593	47.8	+7.2
Conservative hold		Swing		

=== May 2019 ===
2019
Party	Candidate	Votes	%	±%
Conservative	Jackie Shemilt*	2,625	37.4	+0.9
Labour	John Garvani	1,878	26.7	−1.3
Liberal Democrats	Simon Mark Dowling	1,339	19.1	−3.5
Green	Rosa Shaw	838	11.9	−1.0
UKIP	Paul Hellyer	337	4.8	+4.8
Majority		747	10.7	+2.2
Turnout		7,065	40.6	−3.2
Conservative hold		Swing	+1.1	

=== May 2018 ===
2018
Party	Candidate	Votes	%	±%
Conservative	Dawn Collins*	3,195	36.5	+9.3
Conservative	Jonathon Taylor	2,770		
Conservative	Jackie Shemilt	2,660		
Labour	John Garvani	2,453	28.0	+0.5
Labour	Briony Sloan	2,380		
Labour	Nathalie Bethesda	2,208		
Liberal Democrats	Simon Dowling	1,976	22.6	−10.3
Liberal Democrats	Becky Heaviside	1,903		
Liberal Democrats	Christopher Read	1,288		
Green Party - Save Our Green Space	Caroline Tomes	1,132	12.9	+7.0
Majority		742	8.5	+3.1
Turnout		17,539	43.8	+1.6
Conservative hold		Swing		
Conservative gain from Liberal Democrats		Swing		
Conservative gain from Liberal Democrats		Swing		

=== May 2016 ===
2016
Party	Candidate	Votes	%	±%
Liberal Democrats	Chris Townsley*	2,329	32.9	+13.4
Labour Co-op	Ian McCargo	1,945	27.5	+3.2
Conservative	Richard John O'Callaghan	1,923	27.2	−12.9
UKIP	Roger Facer Tattersall	462	6.5	−1.8
Green	Ben Hall	421	5.9	−1.0
Majority		384	5.4	−10.4
Turnout		7,080	42.2	
Liberal Democrats hold		Swing		

=== May 2015 ===
2015
Party	Candidate	Votes	%	±%
Conservative	Dawn Collins*	5,082	40.1	+6.4
Labour	Jake Kelly	3,081	24.3	−3.6
Liberal Democrats	Martin Gareth Hughes	2,480	19.5	−11.5
UKIP	Paul Hellyer	1,047	8.3	+3.0
Green	Harriet Regina Barry	873	6.9	+6.9
TUSC	Gary McVeigh-Kaye	125	1.0	−1.1
Majority		2,001	15.8	+13.1
Turnout		12,688	73.1	
Conservative hold		Swing	+5.0	

=== May 2014 ===
2014
Party	Candidate	Votes	%	±%
Liberal Democrats	Brian Cleasby*	2,037	28.6	−11.4
Conservative	Richard O’Callaghan	1,880	26.4	+0.2
Labour	Rob Wilkinson	1,644	23.1	+2.1
UKIP	Paul Hellyer	1,059	14.9	+8.0
Green	Timothy Goodall	446	6.3	+1.5
TUSC	Benjamin Dixon	56	0.8	−0.4
Majority		157	2.2	
Turnout		7,122	40.88	
Liberal Democrats hold		Swing		

=== May 2012 ===
2012
Party	Candidate	Votes	%	±%
Liberal Democrats	Chris Townsley*	2,636	40.0	+9.0
Conservative	Richard Hardcastle	1,725	26.2	−7.6
Labour	Gary Kaye	1,381	21.0	−6.9
UKIP	Paul Hellyer	453	6.9	+1.6
Green	Andrea Binns	317	4.8	+4.8
TUSC	Andrew Smith	77	1.2	−0.9
Majority		911	13.8	+11.1
Turnout		6,589		
Liberal Democrats hold		Swing	+8.3	

=== May 2011 ===
2011
Party	Candidate	Votes	%	±%
Conservative	Dawn Collins	2,680	33.7	+8.5
Liberal Democrats	Kate Arbuckle	2,466	31.0	−16.8
Labour	Robert Wilkinson	2,213	27.9	+8.9
UKIP	Paul Hellyer	421	5.3	+2.7
TUSC	Andrew Smith	164	2.1	+2.1
Majority		214	2.7	−20.0
Turnout		7,944	45	
Conservative gain from Liberal Democrats		Swing	+12.6	

=== May 2010 ===
2010
Party	Candidate	Votes	%	±%
Liberal Democrats	Brian Cleasby*	5,959	47.9	+2.0
Conservative	Dawn Collins	3,138	25.2	−12.7
Labour	Rebecca Brady	2,356	18.9	+11.1
BNP	Ian Asquith	358	2.9	−1.8
UKIP	Paul Hellyer	326	2.6	+2.6
Green	Andrea Binns	316	2.5	−1.2
Majority		2,821	22.7	+14.8
Turnout		12,453	71.2	+29.3
Liberal Democrats hold		Swing	+7.3	
