= 2004 Leeds City Council election =

- 10 June 2004

All 99 seats on Leeds City Council 50 seats needed for a majority
	First party	Second party	Third party
Leader	Keith Wakefield	Mark Harris	Andrew Carter
Party	Labour	Liberal Democrats	Conservative
Seats won	40	26	24
Seat change	▼12	▲6	▲2
Popular vote	70,441	56,752	65,204
Percentage	29.1%	23.4%	26.9%
	Fourth party	Fifth party	Sixth party
Party	Morley Borough Independents	Green	BNP
Last election	New party	1 seats, 6.0%	0 seats, 2.8%
Seats won	6	3	0
Seat change	▲4	Steady	Steady
Popular vote	6,264	14,454	18,652
Percentage	2.6%	6.0%	7.7%
Swing	▲2.6%	▲1.7%	▲4.9%
- Labour in red, Liberal Democrats in yellow, Conservatives in blue, Morley Borough Independents in dark green and Greens in light green
Council control before election
Majority administration
Labour
Council control after election
No Overall Control
Liberal Democrat-Conservative Coalition

The 2004 Leeds City Council election took place on 10 June 2004 to elect members of City of Leeds Metropolitan Borough Council in England.

Following a full boundary review of Leeds' electoral wards by the Boundary Committee for England, all of the council's 99 seats were contested on the new ward boundaries. The previous all-out election in Leeds was in 1980.

The election saw the previously Labour-run council falling into no overall control. The Liberal Democrats and Conservatives agreed to take control of the council in a formal coalition, the first non-Labour administration in 24 years since 1980.

== Election result ==
Leeds local election result 2004
Party	Seats	Gains	Losses	Net gain/loss	Seats %	Votes %	Votes	+/−
Labour	40	N/A	N/A	▼12	40.4	29.1	70,441	-6.4
Liberal Democrats	26	N/A	N/A	▲6	26.3	23.4	56,752	-1.6
Conservative	24	N/A	N/A	▲4	24.2	26.9	65,204	-2.2
Morley Borough Independent	6	N/A	N/A	▲4	6.1	2.6	6,264	+2.6
Green	3	N/A	N/A	Steady	3.0	6.0	14,454	+1.7
BNP	0	N/A	N/A	Steady	0.0	7.7	18,652	+4.9
Independent	0	N/A	N/A	Steady	0.0	1.9	4,727	+0.0
Alliance for Green Socialism	0	N/A	N/A	Steady	0.0	1.6	3,946	+0.5
UKIP	0	N/A	N/A	Steady	0.0	0.4	993	+0.4
Respect	0	N/A	N/A	Steady	0.0	0.2	520	+0.2
Socialist	0	N/A	N/A	Steady	0.0	0.1	179	-0.1
'Total'	99	N/A	N/A	Steady	100.0	100.0	242,132	▲87,002

This result had the following consequences for the total number of seats on the council after the elections:

Party	Previous council	New council
Labour	52	40
Liberal Democrat	20	26
Conservative	22	24
Morley Borough Independent	2	6
Green	3	3
Total	99	99
Working majority	5	-19

== Ward results ==
Adel & Wharfedale
Party	Candidate	Votes	%	±%
Conservative	Barry Anderson	4,844	54.1	N/A
Conservative	John Carter	4,708		
Conservative	Clive Fox	4,551		
Liberal Democrats	Christina Shaw	2,130	23.8	N/A
Liberal Democrats	Philip Moore	2,007		
Liberal Democrats	Alistair Bradley	1,707		
Labour	Audrey Slee	1,412	15.8	N/A
Labour	Nigel Gill	1,291		
Labour	Patrick Hennigan	1,043		
BNP	Marcus Charlton	568	6.3	N/A
Majority		2,714	30.3	N/A
Turnout		8,628	54.4	N/A
Conservative win (new seat)				
Conservative win (new seat)				
Conservative win (new seat)				

Alwoodley
Party	Candidate	Votes	%	±%
Conservative	Ronald Feldman	4,446	45.2	N/A
Conservative	Ruth Feldman	4,140		
Conservative	Peter Harrand	3,652		
Liberal Democrats	Jonathan Brown	2,952	30.0	N/A
Liberal Democrats	Jane Abramson	2,677		
Liberal Democrats	Judith Chapman	2,660		
Labour	Leonard Fineberg	1,741	17.7	N/A
Labour	Richard Masterton	1,331		
Labour	Graham Platt	1,242		
BNP	Peter Maverick	410	4.2	N/A
Alliance for Green Socialism	Brian Jackson	291	3.0	N/A
Majority		1,494	15.2	N/A
Turnout		8,985	53.2	N/A
Conservative win (new seat)				
Conservative win (new seat)				
Conservative win (new seat)				

Ardsley & Robin Hood
Party	Candidate	Votes	%	±%
Labour	Karen Renshaw	1,993	31.6	N/A
Labour	Jack Dunn	1,775		
Labour	Lisa Mulherin	1,572		
Conservative	Kelly Jamieson	1,357	21.5	N/A
Conservative	David Boynton	1,308		
Conservative	Margaret Schofield	1,201		
BNP	John Hirst	1,158	18.3	N/A
Independent	Paul Cockcroft	981	15.5	N/A
Independent	Brian Judge	920		
Liberal Democrats	James Smith	822	13.0	N/A
Liberal Democrats	Rebecca Smith	799		
Liberal Democrats	Pamela Tebbutt	792		
Independent	Derek Bradley	640		
Majority		636	10.1	N/A
Turnout		5,899	39.1	N/A
Labour win (new seat)				
Labour win (new seat)				
Labour win (new seat)				

Armley
Party	Candidate	Votes	%	±%
Labour	Alison Lowe	2,627	42.4	N/A
Labour	James McKenna	2,392		
Labour	Janet Harper	2,276		
Conservative	Glenn Broadbent	1,071	17.3	N/A
Green	Luke Russell	985	15.9	N/A
Green	Yvonne Clarke	940		
Green	Patrick Collins	855		
Conservative	Nicholas Brown	853		
BNP	Nigel Lennon	780	12.6	N/A
Conservative	Mark Henderson	752		
Liberal Democrats	Jane Buchanan	735	11.9	N/A
Liberal Democrats	Sara Howell	688		
Liberal Democrats	Pravin Dayalji	663		
Majority		1,556	25.1	N/A
Turnout		5,826	35.7	N/A
Labour win (new seat)				
Labour win (new seat)				
Labour win (new seat)				

Beeston & Holbeck
Party	Candidate	Votes	%	±%
Labour	Angela Gabriel	2,264	31.1	N/A
Labour	Adam Ogilvie	2,167		
Labour	David Congreve	1,957		
Liberal Democrats	Kathleen Fenton	1,213	16.7	N/A
Conservative	Ruth Sanderson	1,188	16.3	N/A
Conservative	Robert Winfield	1,064		
Independent	William Birch	1,056	14.5	N/A
BNP	John Powell	984	13.5	N/A
Conservative	Victoria Richmond	879		
Liberal Democrats	Christine Golton	741		
Liberal Democrats	Andrew Wemyss	724		
Green	Christopher Plummer	397	5.5	N/A
Socialist	Kevin Wilson	179	2.5	N/A
Socialist	David Jones	177		
Majority		1,051	14.4	N/A
Turnout		5,779	37.6	N/A
Labour win (new seat)				
Labour win (new seat)				
Labour win (new seat)				

Bramley & Stanningley
Party	Candidate	Votes	%	±%
Labour	Angela Atkinson	2,686	39.7	N/A
Labour	Edmund Hanley	2,211		
Labour	Neil Taggart	2,001		
Liberal Democrats	Eric Scott	1,633	24.1	N/A
Liberal Democrats	Linda Sullivan	1,625		
Liberal Democrats	Patrick Simpson	1,573		
Conservative	Michael Best	1,016	15.0	N/A
BNP	Thomas Linden	866	12.8	N/A
Conservative	Maureen Broadbent	807		
Conservative	Harold Hinchliffe	711		
Green	Francis Gray	567	8.4	N/A
Majority		1,053	15.6	N/A
Turnout		6,046	37.7	N/A
Labour win (new seat)				
Labour win (new seat)				
Labour win (new seat)				

Burmantofts & Richmond Hill
Party	Candidate	Votes	%	±%
Liberal Democrats	Ralph Pryke	2,403	40.0	N/A
Liberal Democrats	Richard Brett	2,354		
Liberal Democrats	David Hollingsworth	2,254		
Labour	Geoffrey Holloran	1,909	31.8	N/A
Labour	Ronald Grahame	1,781		
BNP	Mark Collett	949	15.8	N/A
Independent	Linda Pickles	445	7.4	N/A
Independent	Thomas Blears	394		
Conservative	Simon O'Riordan	300	5.0	N/A
Conservative	Alexander Blackie	211		
Conservative	John Charnley	207		
Majority		494	8.2	N/A
Turnout		5,662	39.7	N/A
Liberal Democrats win (new seat)				
Liberal Democrats win (new seat)				
Liberal Democrats win (new seat)				

Calverley & Farsley
Party	Candidate	Votes	%	±%
Conservative	Andrew Carter	4,574	53.1	N/A
Conservative	Amanda Carter	4,254		
Conservative	Frank Robinson	3,527		
Labour	Thomas Spamer	1,730	20.1	N/A
Labour	Philip Towler	1,347		
Liberal Democrats	Janet Bates	1,324	15.4	N/A
Labour	Kevin Cooney	1,311		
Liberal Democrats	Christine Glover	1,250		
Liberal Democrats	Christine Wilson	1,187		
UKIP	John Walker	993	11.5	N/A
Majority		2,844	33.0	N/A
Turnout		7,802	46.9	N/A
Conservative win (new seat)				
Conservative win (new seat)				
Conservative win (new seat)				

Chapel Allerton
Party	Candidate	Votes	%	±%
Labour	Sharon Hamilton	2,526	36.6	N/A
Labour	Mohammed Rafique	2,166		
Labour	Jane Dowson	2,142		
Liberal Democrats	Timothy Harberd	1,769	25.6	N/A
Liberal Democrats	Pauline Davies	1,475		
Alliance for Green Socialism	Garth Frankland	1,188	17.2	N/A
Liberal Democrats	Waish Miah	1,143		
Alliance for Green Socialism	Beverley Samuels	932		
Conservative	Gavin Riach	717	10.4	N/A
Green	Anthony Wildman	699	10.1	N/A
Alliance for Green Socialism	Amanda Munro	694		
Conservative	Abdul Kotia	683		
Conservative	Syed Hassan-Shah	646		
Majority		757	11.0	N/A
Turnout		6,083	37.9	N/A
Labour win (new seat)				
Labour win (new seat)				
Labour win (new seat)				

City & Hunslet
Party	Candidate	Votes	%	±%
Labour	Elizabeth Nash	1,651	41.7	N/A
Labour	Patrick Davey	1,611		
Labour	Mohammed Iqbal	1,578		
Liberal Democrats	James Monaghan	879	22.2	N/A
Liberal Democrats	Abul Kalam	839		
Liberal Democrats	John Clay	826		
Conservative	Simon Church	563	14.2	N/A
Conservative	Michael Wheeler	500		
Conservative	Douglas Phillips	488		
BNP	Bernard Allen	458	11.6	N/A
Green	Paul Marchant	408	10.3	N/A
Majority		772	19.5	N/A
Turnout		3,845	30.4	N/A
Labour win (new seat)				
Labour win (new seat)				
Labour win (new seat)				

Cross Gates & Whinmoor
Party	Candidate	Votes	%	±%
Labour	Suzanne Armitage	2,973	41.0	N/A
Labour	Pauleen Grahame	2,820		
Labour	Peter Gruen	2,615		
Conservative	Patricia Hyde	2,324	32.1	N/A
Conservative	Dorothy Schofield	2,163		
Conservative	Caroline Anderson	1,953		
BNP	Richard Warrington	775	10.7	N/A
Liberal Democrats	Anne-Marie Pickup	610	8.4	N/A
Independent	Anthony Thope	568	7.8	N/A
Liberal Democrats	Elizabeth McBennett	241		
Liberal Democrats	Anthony Williams	186		
Majority		649	9.0	N/A
Turnout		6,271	37.8	N/A
Labour win (new seat)				
Labour win (new seat)				
Labour win (new seat)				

Farnley & Wortley
Party	Candidate	Votes	%	±%
Green	David Blackburn	3,711	50.9	N/A
Green	Ann Blackburn	3,444		
Green	Claire Nash	3,224		
Labour	Andrew Lockwood	1,545	21.2	N/A
Labour	Stephen Towler	1,481		
Labour	Gerrard Robinson	1,235		
BNP	Janine Bretherick	878	12.1	N/A
Conservative	William Broadbent	804		N/A
Conservative	Brenda Firth	704		
Conservative	George Firth	701		
Liberal Democrats	Ann Skinner	346	4.8	N/A
Liberal Democrats	Henry Bisson	319		
Liberal Democrats	Barbara Thompson	301		
Majority		2,166	29.7	N/A
Turnout		6,796	40.4	N/A
Green win (new seat)				
Green win (new seat)				
Green win (new seat)				

Garforth & Swillington
Party	Candidate	Votes	%	±%
Labour	Andrea Harrison	2,981	34.3	N/A
Conservative	Mark Phillips	2,873	33.0	N/A
Labour	Thomas Murray	2,586		
Conservative	Karen Stevenson	2,550		
Labour	Karen Marshall	2,513		
Conservative	William Flynn	2,105		
Liberal Democrats	Ian Dowling	1,747	20.1	N/A
Liberal Democrats	Anne Bagnall	1,203		
BNP	Mark Jones	1,100	12.6	N/A
Liberal Democrats	Darren Finlay	929		
Majority		108	1.2	N/A
Turnout		7,673	49.1	N/A
Labour win (new seat)				
Conservative win (new seat)				
Labour win (new seat)				

Gipton & Harehills
Party	Candidate	Votes	%	±%
Liberal Democrats	Alan Taylor	3,236	47.7	N/A
Liberal Democrats	Javaid Akhtar	2,972		
Labour	Roger Harington	2,956	43.6	N/A
Liberal Democrats	Andrew Tear	2,841		
Labour	Hanif Hussain	2,779		
Labour	John Garvani	2,703		
Conservative	Margaret Brooks	303	4.5	N/A
Alliance for Green Socialism	Wendy Frankland	288	4.2	N/A
Conservative	John Hilton	287		
Conservative	Anne Hilton	285		
Alliance for Green Socialism	Azar Iqbal	271		
Majority		280	4.1	N/A
Turnout		6,749	45.9	N/A
Liberal Democrats win (new seat)				
Liberal Democrats win (new seat)				
Labour win (new seat)				

Guiseley & Rawdon
Party	Candidate	Votes	%	±%
Conservative	Graham Latty	3,604	41.9	N/A
Conservative	Stuart Andrew	3,600		
Conservative	John Bale	3,367		
Labour	Michael King	1,870	21.7	N/A
Labour	Helena Bowe	1,828		
Labour	Lucinda Yeadon	1,808		
Liberal Democrats	Anthony Henshaw	1,485	17.3	N/A
Liberal Democrats	Lucinda Cleasby	1,436		
Liberal Democrats	Pamela Davies	1,057		
Green	Colin Avison	790	9.2	N/A
BNP	Gillian Leake	634	7.4	N/A
Alliance for Green Socialism	Gareth Christie	217	2.5	N/A
Majority		1,734	20.2	N/A
Turnout		7,745	47.6	N/A
Conservative win (new seat)				
Conservative win (new seat)				
Conservative win (new seat)				

Harewood
Party	Candidate	Votes	%	±%
Conservative	Ann Castle	5,101	63.3	N/A
Conservative	Rachel Procter	4,964		
Conservative	Alec Shelbrooke	4,653		
Liberal Democrats	Albert Pearcey	1,357	16.8	N/A
Labour	Steven Green	1,268	15.7	N/A
Labour	Colin Jackson	1,261		
Liberal Democrats	Katherine Whelan	967		
Labour	John Hardy	954		
Liberal Democrats	Richard Whelan	813		
Alliance for Green Socialism	Fiona Christie	332	4.1	N/A
Majority		3,744	46.5	N/A
Turnout		7,604	52.6	N/A
Conservative win (new seat)				
Conservative win (new seat)				
Conservative win (new seat)				

Headingley
Party	Candidate	Votes	%	±%
Liberal Democrats	David Morton	1,948	44.6	N/A
Liberal Democrats	Gregory Mulholland	1,762		
Liberal Democrats	Martin Hamilton	1,685		
Green	Lesley Jeffries	853	19.5	N/A
Labour	Emma Jones	834	19.1	N/A
Labour	Eamonn McGee	604		
Labour	Gareth Smith	544		
Conservative	Jessica Downer	403	9.2	N/A
Conservative	Elizabeth Beasleigh	397		
Conservative	Gail Barnes	387		
Alliance for Green Socialism	Jeannie Sutton	329	7.5	N/A
Majority		1,095	25.1	N/A
Turnout		3,493	22.1	N/A
Liberal Democrats win (new seat)				
Liberal Democrats win (new seat)				
Liberal Democrats win (new seat)				

Horsforth
Party	Candidate	Votes	%	±%
Liberal Democrats	Christopher Townsley	3,923	41.1	N/A
Liberal Democrats	Andrew Barker	3,453		
Liberal Democrats	Brian Cleasby	3,385		
Conservative	John Hardcastle	2,569	26.9	N/A
Conservative	Dawn Collins	2,265		
Conservative	Neil Hunt	2,206		
Labour	Martin Bell	1,178	12.3	N/A
Labour	Jacqueline Marsden	1,164		
Labour	Alex Sobel	788		
Green	Andrea Binns	704	7.4	N/A
Independent	Douglas Holmes	625	6.5	N/A
BNP	Dean Taylor	549	5.7	N/A
Majority		1,354	14.2	N/A
Turnout		8,083	48.2	N/A
Liberal Democrats win (new seat)				
Liberal Democrats win (new seat)				
Liberal Democrats win (new seat)				

Hyde Park & Woodhouse
Party	Candidate	Votes	%	±%
Liberal Democrats	Joan Ewens	1,977	47.8	N/A
Liberal Democrats	Kabeer Hussain	1,819		
Liberal Democrats	Linda Rhodes-Clayton	1,654		
Labour	Wilhelmina Kainyek	1,219	29.5	N/A
Labour	Michael McGowan	1,152		
Labour	Ian McCargo	1,065		
Respect	Katherine Owen	520	12.6	N/A
Conservative	Samantha Shaw	422	10.2	N/A
Conservative	Linda Feldman	354		
Conservative	Charles Ranson	335		
Majority		758	18.3	N/A
Turnout		3,858	26.6	N/A
Liberal Democrats win (new seat)				
Liberal Democrats win (new seat)				
Liberal Democrats win (new seat)				

Killingbeck & Seacroft
Party	Candidate	Votes	%	±%
Labour	Graham Hyde	3,071	50.9	N/A
Labour	Michael Davey	2,947		
Labour	Brian Selby	2,632		
Liberal Democrats	Margaret Tait	1,105	18.3	N/A
BNP	Darren Gibson	1,079	17.9	N/A
Liberal Democrats	Sadie Fisher	1,025		
Liberal Democrats	Ross Jowett	1,007		
Conservative	Roy Jones	778	12.9	N/A
Conservative	Beatrice Greenwood	762		
Conservative	Estelle Davis	744		
Majority		1,966	32.6	N/A
Turnout		5,973	37.8	N/A
Labour win (new seat)				
Labour win (new seat)				
Labour win (new seat)				

Kippax & Methley
Party	Candidate	Votes	%	±%
Labour	John Parker	3,597	53.1	N/A
Labour	James Lewis	3,440		
Labour	Keith Wakefield	3,363		
Conservative	Tina Phillips	1,487	21.9	N/A
Conservative	Henry Grogan	1,380		
Conservative	Elaine Grogan	1,377		
BNP	Christopher Andrews	850	12.5	N/A
Liberal Democrats	Elizabeth Brazier	843	12.4	N/A
Liberal Democrats	John McArthur	794		
BNP	John Weever	772		
Liberal Democrats	Edward Joce	727		
Majority		2,110	31.1	N/A
Turnout		6,726	44.0	N/A
Labour win (new seat)				
Labour win (new seat)				
Labour win (new seat)				

Kirkstall
Party	Candidate	Votes	%	±%
Labour	Elizabeth Minkin	2,405	40.5	N/A
Labour	John Illingworth	2,263		
Labour	Bernard Atha	2,249		
Liberal Democrats	Andrew Gilbert	1,775	29.9	N/A
Liberal Democrats	Leanne Winfield	1,722		
Liberal Democrats	Sitara Khan	1,570		
Conservative	Dorothy Flynn	695	11.7	N/A
Green	Catherine Harmer	674	11.3	N/A
Conservative	Graham Castle	669		
Conservative	Trevor McCartney	667		
Green	Elizabeth Holmes	655		
Green	Martin Reed	591		
Independent	David Anderson-Steel	395	6.6	N/A
Majority		630	10.6	N/A
Turnout		5,800	37.4	N/A
Labour win (new seat)				
Labour win (new seat)				
Labour win (new seat)				

Middleton Park
Party	Candidate	Votes	%	±%
Labour	Geoffrey Driver	2,173	40.9	N/A
Labour	Judith Blake	2,111		
Labour	Stuart Bruce	2,082		
Conservative	Richard Barker	1,146	21.5	N/A
BNP	Julie Day	1,123	21.1	N/A
Conservative	Craig Smith	997		
Conservative	Anthony Larvin	981		
Liberal Democrats	John Fenton	877	16.5	N/A
Liberal Democrats	Sarah McCormick	711		
Liberal Democrats	Anthony Paley-Smith	641		
Majority		1,027	19.3	N/A
Turnout		5,425	33.5	N/A
Labour win (new seat)				
Labour win (new seat)				
Labour win (new seat)				

Moortown
Party	Candidate	Votes	%	±%
Liberal Democrats	Mark Harris	3,834	46.3	N/A
Liberal Democrats	Brenda Lancaster	3,398		
Liberal Democrats	Richard Harker	3,292		
Conservative	Lyn Buckley	2,093	25.3	N/A
Conservative	Edward Stafford	2,058		
Labour	Malcolm Hardy	1,812	21.9	N/A
Conservative	Ahmed Effendi	1,756		
Labour	David Dresser	1,638		
Labour	Sandra Womack	1,380		
Alliance for Green Socialism	Michael Davies	542	6.5	N/A
Majority		1,741	21.0	N/A
Turnout		7,832	47.6	N/A
Liberal Democrats win (new seat)				
Liberal Democrats win (new seat)				
Liberal Democrats win (new seat)				

Morley North
Party	Candidate	Votes	%	±%
Morley Borough Independent	Robert Finnigan	3,860	46.3	N/A
Morley Borough Independent	Stewart McArdle	3,439		
Morley Borough Independent	Thomas Leadley	3,088		
Labour	Neil Dawson	1,379	16.5	N/A
Labour	Elizabeth Hill	1,367		
Conservative	Robert Allen	1,169	14.0	N/A
Labour	John Chadwick	1,167		
BNP	Thomas Redmond	1,086	13.0	N/A
Conservative	Stephen Kearns	784		
Conservative	Elizabeth Hayes	760		
Liberal Democrats	Harriet Chapman	441	5.3	N/A
Liberal Democrats	Benjamin Chapman	416		
Green	Irene Dracup	400	4.8	N/A
Liberal Democrats	Gertrude Goldberg	334		
Majority		2,481	29.8	N/A
Turnout		7,249	44.1	N/A
Morley Borough Independent win (new seat)				
Morley Borough Independent win (new seat)				
Morley Borough Independent win (new seat)				

Morley South
Party	Candidate	Votes	%	±%
Morley Borough Independent	Judith Elliott	2,404	33.0	N/A
Morley Borough Independent	Terence Grayshon	2,262		
Morley Borough Independent	Gareth Beevers	2,239		
Labour	Sherry Bradley	1,893	26.0	N/A
Labour	David Langham	1,659		
Labour	Debra Coupar	1,489		
BNP	Christopher Beverley	1,263	17.4	N/A
Independent	Charles Slingsby	657	9.0	N/A
Conservative	Carole Charnley	643	8.8	N/A
Conservative	Thomas McMeeking	595		
Conservative	Diane Francis	588		
Liberal Democrats	Jack Coplin	414	5.7	N/A
Liberal Democrats	Dorothy Harris	390		
Liberal Democrats	Rochelle Harris	376		
Majority		511	7.0	N/A
Turnout		6,250	40.5	N/A
Morley Borough Independent win (new seat)				
Morley Borough Independent win (new seat)				
Morley Borough Independent win (new seat)				

Otley & Yeadon
Party	Candidate	Votes	%	±%
Liberal Democrats	Graham Kirkland	3,557	31.2	N/A
Liberal Democrats	Colin Campbell	3,369		
Liberal Democrats	Richard Downes	2,749		
Conservative	Nigel Francis	2,621	23.0	N/A
Labour	John Eveleigh	2,378	20.9	N/A
Conservative	Gerard Francis	2,367		
Conservative	John Sharples	2,149		
Green	Tony Addison	1,990	17.5	N/A
Labour	Doreen Illingworth	1,674		
Green	Aimee van Vliet	968		
BNP	Lee Rossington	590	5.2	N/A
Alliance for Green Socialism	Louis Frankland	251	2.2	N/A
Majority		936	8.2	N/A
Turnout		8,792	51.8	N/A
Liberal Democrats win (new seat)				
Liberal Democrats win (new seat)				
Liberal Democrats win (new seat)				

Pudsey
Party	Candidate	Votes	%	±%
Labour	Josephine Jarosz	3,209	42.4	N/A
Labour	Richard Lewis	3,191		
Labour	Eugene "Mick" Coulson	3,009		
Conservative	Beryl Pearson	2,295	30.4	N/A
Conservative	Terence Pearson	2,254		
Conservative	Jason Aldiss	2,204		
Liberal Democrats	Paul Dobson	1,145	15.1	N/A
Liberal Democrats	Janice Hogan	976		
Liberal Democrats	Ian Howell	949		
BNP	Robert Leary	911	12.1	N/A
Majority		914	12.1	N/A
Turnout		7,491	45.6	N/A
Labour win (new seat)				
Labour win (new seat)				
Labour win (new seat)				

Rothwell
Party	Candidate	Votes	%	±%
Liberal Democrats	Donald Wilson	3,004	43.0	N/A
Liberal Democrats	Steve Smith	2,978		
Liberal Democrats	Michael Galdas	2,735		
Labour	Alec Hudson	2,400	34.4	N/A
Labour	James Normington	2,164		
Labour	Tina Davy	1,709		
BNP	Tracy Andrews	795	11.4	N/A
Conservative	Lloyd Frost	787	11.3	N/A
Conservative	Caroline Judge	740		
Conservative	Robert Tesseyman	703		
Majority		604	8.6	N/A
Turnout		6,699	44.3	N/A
Liberal Democrats win (new seat)				
Liberal Democrats win (new seat)				
Liberal Democrats win (new seat)				

Roundhay
Party	Candidate	Votes	%	±%
Conservative	Matthew Lobley	3,486	33.8	N/A
Conservative	Valerie Kendall	3,223		
Conservative	Paul Wadsworth	3,044		
Labour	Irene O'Grady	2,775	26.9	N/A
Labour	Christine MacNavin	2,653		
Liberal Democrats	Rosemary Clay	2,334	22.6	N/A
Labour	Gerald Harper	2,143		
Liberal Democrats	Altaf Hussein	1,988		
Liberal Democrats	John Skinner	1,854		
Green	Paul Ellis	1,216	11.8	N/A
Alliance for Green Socialism	Malcolm Christie	508	4.9	N/A
Majority		711	6.9	N/A
Turnout		8,922	54.2	N/A
Conservative win (new seat)				
Conservative win (new seat)				
Conservative win (new seat)				

Temple Newsam
Party	Candidate	Votes	%	±%
Conservative	William Hyde	2,668	37.1	N/A
Conservative	David Schofield	2,596		
Labour	Michael Lyons	2,486	34.6	N/A
Labour	Caroline Strain	2,407		
Conservative	Donald Townsley	2,399		
Labour	Marlene Lyons	2,378		
Liberal Democrats	Ann Norman	1,187	16.5	N/A
Liberal Democrats	Keith Norman	1,127		
Liberal Democrats	Priscilla Truss	994		
BNP	George Geapin	846	11.8	N/A
Majority		182	2.5	N/A
Turnout		7,032	45.7	N/A
Conservative win (new seat)				
Conservative win (new seat)				
Labour win (new seat)				

Weetwood
Party	Candidate	Votes	%	±%
Liberal Democrats	Brian Jennings	2,721	35.6	N/A
Liberal Democrats	Susan Bentley	2,354		
Liberal Democrats	Barry Golton	2,350		
Conservative	Keith Loudon	2,071	27.1	N/A
Conservative	Tim Metcalfe	1,973		
Conservative	Anne Miller	1,963		
Labour	Dudley Parker	1,785	23.4	N/A
Labour	Graham Mann	1,630		
Labour	Ilan Sherman	1,439		
Green	David Webb	1,060	13.9	N/A
Majority		650	8.5	N/A
Turnout		6,954	43.3	N/A
Liberal Democrats win (new seat)				
Liberal Democrats win (new seat)				
Liberal Democrats win (new seat)				

Wetherby
Party	Candidate	Votes	%	±%
Conservative	Gerald Wilkinson	4,786	63.6	N/A
Conservative	Andrew Millard	4,605		
Conservative	John Procter	4,372		
Labour	John Kettle	1,715	22.8	N/A
Labour	Richard Burgon	1,558		
Labour	Stuart Mitchell	1,301		
Liberal Democrats	William Howells	1,026	13.6	N/A
Liberal Democrats	James Hoskins	982		
Liberal Democrats	Jonathan Levy	918		
Majority		3,071	40.8	N/A
Turnout		7,468	49.7	N/A
Conservative win (new seat)				
Conservative win (new seat)				
Conservative win (new seat)				

== By-elections between 2004 and 2006 ==
Headingley by-election 28 July 2005 replacing Greg Mulholland (resigned)
Party	Candidate	Votes	%	±%
Liberal Democrats	James Monaghan	903	58.2	+13.6
Labour	Katherine Mitchell	433	28.0	+8.9
Green	Lesley Jeffries	100	6.4	−13.1
Conservative	Thomas McMeeking	77	5.0	−4.2
Alliance for Green Socialism	Brian Jackson	37	2.4	−5.1
Majority		470	30.2	+5.1
Turnout		1,550	9.5	−12.6
Liberal Democrats hold		Swing	+2.3	
