= Leeds (European Parliament constituency) =

Former European Parliament constituency

- European Parliament constituency
- Boundary within Yorkshire and the Humber (1979-1984)
- Member state: United Kingdom
- Created: 1979
- Dissolved: 1999
- MEPs: 1

Leeds was a European Parliament constituency, centred on Leeds in the West Yorkshire area of England.

Prior to its uniform adoption of proportional representation in 1999, the United Kingdom used first-past-the-post for the European elections in England, Scotland and Wales. The European Parliament constituencies used under that system were smaller than the later regional constituencies and only had one Member of the European Parliament each.

When it was created in England in 1979, it consisted of the Westminster Parliament constituencies of Batley and Morley, Leeds East, Leeds North East, Leeds North West, Leeds South, Leeds South East, Leeds West and Pudsey. In 1984, Batley and Morley, Leeds South and Leeds South West were replaced by Elmet, Leeds Central and Morley and Leeds South.

In 1999, the constituency became part of the much larger Yorkshire and the Humber constituency.

Boundary within Yorkshire and the Humber (1984-1994)

Boundary within Yorkshire and the Humber (1994-1999)

== Members of the European Parliament ==
| Elected | Name | Party |
|---|---|---|
| 1979 | Derek Enright | Labour |
| 1984 | Michael McGowan | Labour |
| 1999 | Constituency abolished: see Yorkshire and the Humber | |

== Results ==
European Parliament election, 1979: Leeds
| Party | Candidate | Votes | % | ±% |
|---|---|---|---|---|
| Labour | Derek Enright | 62,475 | 45.6 | |
| Conservative | P. C. Price | 54,405 | 39.8 | |
| Liberal | David Austick | 20,005 | 14.6 | |
| Majority | | 8,070 | 5.8 | |
| Turnout | | 136,885 | 28.6 | |
| Labour win (new seat) | | | | |

European Parliament election, 1984: Leeds
| Party | Candidate | Votes | % | ±% |
|---|---|---|---|---|
| Labour | Michael McGowan | 86,259 | 42.3 | −3.3 |
| Conservative | John G. Holt | 60,178 | 36.1 | −3.7 |
| Liberal | Stephen J. Cooksey | 36,097 | 21.6 | +7.0 |
| Majority | | 10,357 | 6.2 | +0.4 |
| Turnout | | 182,534 | 31.6 | +3.0 |
| Labour hold | | Swing | | |

European Parliament election, 1989: Leeds
| Party | Candidate | Votes | % | ±% |
|---|---|---|---|---|
| Labour | Michael McGowan | 97,385 | 52.2 | +9.9 |
| Conservative | John Tweddle | 54,867 | 29.4 | −6.7 |
| Green | Clive Lord | 22,558 | 12.1 | New |
| SLD | J. Ewens | 11,720 | 6.3 | −15.3 |
| Majority | | 42,518 | 22.8 | +14.6 |
| Turnout | | 186,530 | 37.1 | +5.5 |
| Labour hold | | Swing | | |

European Parliament election, 1994: Leeds
| Party | Candidate | Votes | % | ±% |
|---|---|---|---|---|
| Labour | Michael McGowan | 89,160 | 56.9 | +4.7 |
| Conservative | Neil Carmichael | 36,078 | 23.0 | −6.4 |
| Liberal Democrats | Jane Harvey | 17,557 | 11.2 | +4.9 |
| Liberal | Michael Meadowcroft | 6,617 | 4.2 | New |
| Green | Claire Nash | 6,283 | 4.0 | −8.1 |
| Natural Law | Sarah Jane Hayward | 1,018 | 0.7 | New |
| Majority | | 53,082 | 33.9 | +11.1 |
| Turnout | | 156,713 | 30.0 | −7.1 |
| Labour hold | | Swing | | |
