= 1999 Leeds City Council election =

1999 UK local government election

- 6 May 1999

33 of the 99 seats on Leeds City Council 50 seats needed for a majority
	First party	Second party	Third party
Party	Labour	Liberal Democrats	Conservative
Last election	21 seats, 49.3%	3 seats, 19.7%	5 seats, 27.8%
Seats won	21	9	9
Seats after	71	14	12
Seat change	▼7	▲4	▲3
Popular vote	67,734	32,644	40,585
Percentage	46.1%	22.2%	27.6%
Swing	▼3.2pp	▲2.5pp	▼0.2pp
	Fourth party
Party	Green
Last election	1 seat, 2.3%
Seats won	1
Seats after	1
Seat change	Steady
Popular vote	5,227
Percentage	3.6%
Swing	▲1.3%
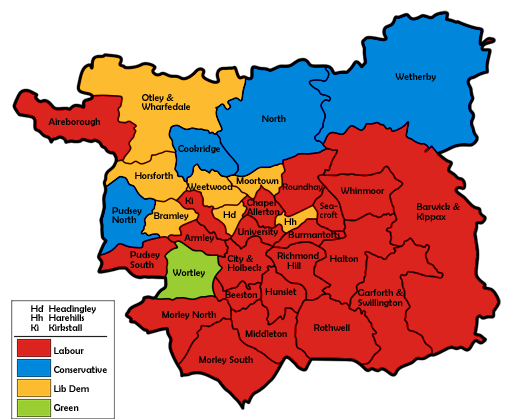
- Map of the results for the 1999 Leeds council election.

The 1999 Leeds City Council election took place on 6 May 1999 to elect members of City of Leeds Metropolitan Borough Council in West Yorkshire, England. One third of the council was up for election, as well as a vacancy each in Horsforth, Moortown and Wetherby. Prior to the election, the Liberal Democrats had gained a seat in Bramley from Labour, and Hunslet councillor, Mark Davies, had defected from Labour to Independent Socialist.

Labour stayed in overall control of the council. Overall turnout in the election was 27.3%.

== Election result ==
Leeds local election result 1999
Party	Seats	Gains	Losses	Net gain/loss	Seats %	Votes %	Votes	+/−
Labour	21	0	7	-7	58.3	46.1	67,734	-3.2%
Liberal Democrats	9	4	0	+4	25.0	22.2	32,644	+2.5%
Conservative	5	3	0	+3	13.9	27.6	40,585	-0.2%
Green	1	0	0	0	2.8	3.6	5,227	+1.3%
Leeds Left Alliance	0	0	0	0	0	0.4	522	+0.1%
Independent	0	0	0	0	0	0.1	163	-0.4%
Seacroft Community Party	0	0	0	0	0	0.1	96	+0.1%

This result had the following consequences for the total number of seats on the council after the elections:

Party	Previous council	New council
Labour	78	71
Liberal Democrat	10	14
Conservative	9	12
Green	1	1
Independent Socialist	1	1
Total	99	99
Working majority	57	43

== Ward results ==
Aireborough
Party	Candidate	Votes	%	±%
Labour	Michael Dunn	2,919	43.6	−3.1
Conservative	Graham Latty	2,719	40.6	+4.1
Liberal Democrats	Ian Hutton	1,055	15.8	−1.0
Majority		200	3.0	−7.2
Turnout		6,693	33.8	+2.8
Labour hold		Swing	-3.6	

Armley
Party	Candidate	Votes	%	±%
Labour	Janet Harper	2,032	61.1	−1.5
Conservative	Glenn Broadbent	558	16.8	+0.7
Liberal Democrats	Andrew Davies	516	15.5	−1.3
Green	Yvonne Clarke	218	6.6	+6.6
Majority		1,474	44.3	−1.5
Turnout		3,324	20.9	+2.4
Labour hold		Swing	-1.1	

Barwick & Kippax
Party	Candidate	Votes	%	±%
Labour	Marian Monks	3,592	60.8	−0.9
Conservative	Jack Stott	1,592	26.9	+1.0
Liberal Democrats	Natasha De Vere	725	12.3	−0.1
Majority		2,000	33.9	−1.9
Turnout		5,909	32.9	+5.1
Labour hold		Swing	-0.9	

Beeston
Party	Candidate	Votes	%	±%
Labour	Adam Ogilvie	1,515	56.7	+1.5
Conservative	William Birch	751	28.1	+8.2
Liberal Democrats	Shaun Dolan	405	15.2	−4.1
Majority		764	28.6	−6.7
Turnout		2,671	21.5	+1.8
Labour hold		Swing	-3.3	

Bramley
Party	Candidate	Votes	%	±%
Liberal Democrats	Ian Howell	1,587	47.6	+32.1
Labour	Stephen Simpson	1,493	44.7	−24.6
Conservative	Michael Best	257	7.7	−7.5
Majority		94	2.8	−51.0
Turnout		3,337	20.3	+4.0
Liberal Democrats gain from Labour		Swing	+28.3	

Burmantofts
Party	Candidate	Votes	%	±%
Labour	Tina Davy	1,859	67.3	−1.8
Liberal Democrats	Margaret Betteridge	522	18.9	−4.0
Conservative	Jean Higham	231	8.4	+0.4
Leeds Left Alliance	Malcolm Christie	150	5.4	+5.4
Majority		1,337	48.4	+2.2
Turnout		2,762	21.0	+1.5
Labour hold		Swing	+1.1	

Chapel Allerton
Party	Candidate	Votes	%	±%
Labour	Norma Hutchinson	2,347	59.2	−9.7
Conservative	Arshad Ali	853	21.5	+3.9
Liberal Democrats	Rochelle Harris	505	12.7	−0.8
Green	Martin Reed	259	6.5	+6.5
Majority		1,494	37.7	−13.6
Turnout		3,964	26.9	+6.0
Labour hold		Swing	-6.8	

City & Holbeck
Party	Candidate	Votes	%	±%
Labour	Mohammed Iqbal	1,744	61.2	−5.1
Conservative	Stephen McBarron	413	14.5	+1.9
Liberal Democrats	Ann Norman	417	14.6	+4.5
Leeds Left Alliance (Socialist)	David Jones	161	5.6	−1.7
Green	Colin Johnston	116	4.1	+0.4
Majority		1,327	46.5	−7.2
Turnout		2,851	19.2	+2.0
Labour hold		Swing	-3.5	

Cookridge
Party	Candidate	Votes	%	±%
Conservative	Barry Anderson	2,888	51.6	−2.8
Labour	John Garvani	1,688	30.2	+1.5
Liberal Democrats	Darren Finlay	875	15.6	−1.3
Green	Paul Marchant	147	2.6	+2.6
Majority		1,200	21.4	−4.3
Turnout		5,598	33.4	+2.2
Conservative gain from Labour		Swing	-2.1	

Garforth & Swillington
Party	Candidate	Votes	%	±%
Labour	Alan Groves	3,269	61.4	−1.9
Conservative	Alan Lamb	1,283	24.1	+1.5
Liberal Democrats	Ian Dowling	776	14.6	+0.5
Majority		1,986	37.3	−3.4
Turnout		5,328	28.5	+2.4
Labour hold		Swing	-1.7	

Halton
Party	Candidate	Votes	%	±%
Labour	Doris McGee	2,262	44.9	−1.4
Conservative	David Schofield	2,112	41.9	+1.6
Liberal Democrats	David Hollingsworth	666	13.2	−0.2
Majority		150	3.0	−3.0
Turnout		5,040	28.0	+2.7
Labour hold		Swing	-1.5	

Harehills
Party	Candidate	Votes	%	±%
Liberal Democrats	Alan Taylor	2,395	51.4	+28.5
Labour	John Clare	2,083	44.7	−16.0
Conservative	Donald Townsley	178	3.8	−5.5
Majority		312	6.7	−31.1
Turnout		4,656	33.0	+13.0
Liberal Democrats gain from Labour		Swing	+22.2	

Headingley
Party	Candidate	Votes	%	±%
Liberal Democrats	David Pratt	1,801	44.0	+20.2
Labour	Paul Moxon	1,573	38.4	−10.3
Green	Lesley Jeffries	391	9.6	−1.4
Conservative	Thomas McMeeking	328	8.0	−8.5
Majority		228	5.6	−19.2
Turnout		4,093	20.0	+7.5
Liberal Democrats gain from Labour		Swing	+15.2	

Horsforth
Party	Candidate	Votes	%	±%
Liberal Democrats	Brian Cleasby	2,694	46.6	+0.5
Liberal Democrats	Thomas Nossiter	2,510		
Conservative	John Hardcastle	1,541	26.7	−0.8
Conservative	Sheila Jackson	1,414		
Labour	Edmund Hanley	1,287	22.3	−0.5
Labour	David Marsh	1,273		
Green	Irene Dracup	254	4.4	+2.5
Majority		969	20.0	+1.3
Turnout		5,776	33.3	+1.7
Liberal Democrats hold		Swing		
Liberal Democrats hold		Swing	+0.6	

Hunslet
Party	Candidate	Votes	%	±%
Labour	John Erskine	1,586	75.6	−2.6
Conservative	Anthony Larvin	233	11.1	+1.7
Liberal Democrats	Christine Glover	222	10.6	+2.1
Green	Charles Price	58	2.8	−1.1
Majority		1,353	64.5	−4.3
Turnout		2,099	18.6	+1.4
Labour hold		Swing	-2.1	

Kirkstall
Party	Candidate	Votes	%	±%
Labour	John Illingworth	2,246	66.7	−0.5
Conservative	David Higgott	460	13.7	−0.9
Liberal Democrats	Barbara Thompson	399	11.9	+1.0
Green	Janet Pritchard	260	7.7	+0.4
Majority		1,786	53.0	+0.4
Turnout		3,365	21.7	+3.1
Labour hold		Swing	+0.2	

Middleton
Party	Candidate	Votes	%	±%
Labour	Stuart Bruce	1,848	65.3	−8.9
Conservative	Susan Nicholls	617	21.8	+8.1
Liberal Democrats	Pauline Davies	366	12.9	+0.8
Majority		1,231	43.5	−17.0
Turnout		2,831	19.7	+1.3
Labour hold		Swing	-8.5	

Moortown
Party	Candidate	Votes	%	±%
Liberal Democrats	Christine Brett	2,576	48.6	+0.5
Liberal Democrats	Brenda Lancaster	2,286		
Labour	Leonard Fineberg	1,689	31.9	−1.8
Labour	Sheila Saunders	1,589		
Conservative	Valerie Kendall	1,030	19.5	+1.2
Conservative	William Hyde	992		
Majority		597	16.8	+2.4
Turnout		5,295	34.7	+3.0
Liberal Democrats hold		Swing		
Liberal Democrats hold		Swing	+1.1	

Morley North
Party	Candidate	Votes	%	±%
Labour	Philip Jones	2,582	55.1	+1.3
Conservative	Robert Tesseyman	1,424	30.4	+0.4
Liberal Democrats	Christine Golton	504	10.8	+1.3
Green	Andrea Binns	174	3.7	+3.7
Majority		1,158	24.7	+0.9
Turnout		4,684	25.0	+2.0
Labour hold		Swing	+0.4	

Morley South
Party	Candidate	Votes	%	±%
Labour	Raymond Mitchell	2,460	59.2	−2.8
Conservative	Robert Allen	1,063	25.6	+0.8
Liberal Democrats	Dorothy Harris	629	15.1	+2.0
Majority		1,397	33.6	−3.6
Turnout		4,152	19.3	+0.9
Labour hold		Swing	-1.8	

North
Party	Candidate	Votes	%	±%
Conservative	Ruth Feldman	2,315	41.5	+3.4
Liberal Democrats	Andrew Bell	1,841	33.0	−2.1
Labour	John Sully	1,417	25.4	−1.4
Majority		474	8.5	+5.5
Turnout		5,573	32.8	−0.1
Conservative gain from Labour		Swing	+2.7	

Otley & Wharfedale
Party	Candidate	Votes	%	±%
Liberal Democrats	Graham Kirkland	3,000	40.9	+9.2
Conservative	Christine Smith	2,421	33.0	−0.6
Labour	Ruth Blackwell	1,918	26.1	−8.6
Majority		579	7.9	+6.8
Turnout		7,339	38.7	+4.1
Liberal Democrats hold		Swing	+4.9	

Pudsey North
Party	Candidate	Votes	%	±%
Conservative	Amanda Carter	3,475	54.6	+8.4
Labour	Thomas Spamer	2,230	35.1	−8.3
Liberal Democrats	Jim Souper	656	10.3	−0.1
Majority		2,245	19.5	+16.7
Turnout		6,361	35.6	+3.2
Conservative gain from Labour		Swing	+8.3	

Pudsey South
Party	Candidate	Votes	%	±%
Labour	Josephine Jarosz	2,219	51.4	−3.7
Conservative	Audrey Smith	1,589	36.8	+11.5
Liberal Democrats	Pauline Bardon	359	8.3	−9.1
Green	Graham Illingworth	150	3.5	+1.3
Majority		630	14.6	−15.1
Turnout		4,317	26.5	+2.2
Labour hold		Swing	-7.6	

Richmond Hill
Party	Candidate	Votes	%	±%
Labour	Marlene Lyons	1,769	75.2	−2.2
Liberal Democrats	Keith Norman	349	14.8	+0.8
Conservative	David Boynton	235	10.0	+1.4
Majority		1,420	60.4	−3.0
Turnout		2,353	18.6	+2.5
Labour hold		Swing	-1.5	

Rothwell
Party	Candidate	Votes	%	±%
Labour	Brian Walker	2,181	57.0	−3.2
Liberal Democrats	Mitchell Galdas	942	24.6	+5.1
Conservative	John Cowling	705	18.4	−1.9
Majority		1,239	32.4	−7.5
Turnout		3,828	24.6	+2.3
Labour hold		Swing	-4.1	

Roundhay
Party	Candidate	Votes	%	±%
Labour	Michael Fox	2,666	45.2	+8.4
Conservative	Ann Castle	2,391	40.5	−3.1
Liberal Democrats	Ann Skinner	841	14.3	−5.3
Majority		275	4.7	−2.1
Turnout		5,898	35.6	+4.1
Labour hold		Swing	+5.7	

Seacroft
Party	Candidate	Votes	%	±%
Labour	Brian Selby	2,042	77.7	+2.3
Conservative	Roy Jones	234	8.9	−1.4
Liberal Democrats	Sadie Fisher	168	6.4	−1.0
Seacroft Community Party	Raymond Northgreaves	96	3.7	−1.1
Green	Michael Bolton	87	3.3	+1.2
Majority		1,808	68.8	+3.7
Turnout		2,627	21.5	+0.1
Labour hold		Swing	+1.8	

University
Party	Candidate	Votes	%	±%
Labour	Gerald Harper	1,461	55.6	−7.4
Liberal Democrats	Kathleen Tebbutt	645	24.5	+10.8
Conservative	Robert Winfield	227	8.6	−1.7
Green	Paul Eade	173	6.6	+0.4
Leeds Left Alliance (Socialist)	Christopher Hill	122	4.6	−2.3
Majority		816	31.1	−18.2
Turnout		2,628	16.7	+3.8
Labour hold		Swing	-9.1	

Weetwood
Party	Candidate	Votes	%	±%
Liberal Democrats	Brian Jennings	2,266	39.6	−0.5
Labour	Eileen Moxon	2,241	39.2	+3.5
Conservative	Graham Castle	954	16.7	−4.4
Green	David Webb	261	4.6	+1.5
Majority		25	0.4	−4.0
Turnout		5,722	35.0	+0.9
Liberal Democrats gain from Labour		Swing	-2.0	

Wetherby
Party	Candidate	Votes	%	±%
Conservative	David Hudson	4,327	57.9	−4.3
Conservative	Gerald Wilkinson	4,257		
Labour	Reginald Steel	1,883	25.2	−3.2
Labour	Pauline Birch	1,519		
Liberal Democrats	Michael Welby	1,265	16.9	+7.4
Majority		2,374	32.7	−1.1
Turnout		7,475	36.0	+5.2
Conservative hold		Swing		
Conservative hold		Swing	-0.5	

Whinmoor
Party	Candidate	Votes	%	±%
Labour	Peter Gruen	1,886	54.2	−3.9
Conservative	Richard Williams	1,021	29.4	−0.8
Liberal Democrats	Graham Roberts	319	9.2	−2.6
Independent	Anthony Thorpe	163	4.7	+4.7
Leeds Left Alliance	Amanda Munro	89	2.6	+2.6
Majority		1,567	24.8	−3.1
Turnout		3,478	25.5	+4.8
Labour hold		Swing	-1.5	

Wortley
Party	Candidate	Votes	%	±%
Green	David Blackburn	2,679	54.2	+14.9
Labour	Daphne Riley	1,747	35.3	−7.1
Liberal Democrats	Richard Cutress	358	7.2	+0.5
Conservative	Ruby Patel	160	3.2	−8.3
Majority		932	18.9	+15.8
Turnout		4,944	29.1	+4.6
Green hold		Swing	+11.0	

== By-elections between 1999 and 2000 ==
Harehills by-election 13 April 2000
Party	Candidate	Votes	%	±%
Liberal Democrats	Javaid Akhtar	2,236	50.9	−0.5
Labour	John Clare	2,002	45.6	+0.9
Conservative	Donald Townsley	125	2.8	−1.0
Leeds Left Alliance	Jane Young	26	0.6	+0.6
Majority		234	5.3	−1.4
Turnout		4,389	31.5	−1.5
Liberal Democrats gain from Labour		Swing	-0.7	
