= Keith Wakefield =

English local politician (1948–2026)

Keith Wakefield OBE

Leader of Leeds City Council
- In office 27 May 2010 – 21 May 2015
- Preceded by: Andrew Carter (Joint Leader)
- Succeeded by: Judith Blake
- In office May 2003 – 28 June 2004
- Preceded by: Brian Walker
- Succeeded by: Mark Harris (Joint Leader)

Leader of the Opposition on Leeds City Council
- In office 28 June 2004 – 27 May 2010
- Preceded by: Mark Harris
- Succeeded by: Andrew Carter

Leader of the Labour Party on Leeds City Council
- In office May 2003 – 11 May 2015
- Preceded by: Brian Walker
- Succeeded by: Judith Blake

Leeds City Councillor for Kippax and Methley Ward
- In office 2004–2019
- Preceded by: Ward created
- Succeeded by: Mirelle Midgley

Leeds City Councillor for Barwick and Kippax Ward
- In office 1988–2004
- Preceded by: Frank Flatters
- Succeeded by: Ward abolished

Personal details
- Born: 27 July 1948 Herefordshire, England
- Died: 19 September 2026 (aged 78) Leeds, England
- Party: Labour
- Children: 3
- Education: University of Birmingham; University of Warwick; University of Huddersfield

Keith Ivor Wakefield OBE (formerly Sturgess; 27 July 1948 – 19 September 2026) was an English Labour politician and twice Leader of Leeds City Council from 2003 to 2004 and 2010 to 2015. He served as a councillor for 31 years between 1988 and 2019.

== Early years, education and teaching career ==
Wakefield was born in Herefordshire on 27 July 1948. After separating from his father while Wakefield was an infant, his mother, Aileen Mable, was unable to manage his care as a single parent and Wakefield was raised in an orphanage in Birmingham. He was fostered at seven years old and moved to Leicester. He revealed in a 2013 profile by The Yorkshire Post he had suffered from neglect by his foster parents.

He left school at 14 with no qualifications, working in various blue-collar roles including in manufacturing. Wakefield studied as a mature student for various qualifications, including O-Levels and A-Levels. He later graduated from the University of Birmingham with a degree in Government, a Master's degree in Industrial Relations from the University of Warwick at the age of 30, and a Postgraduate Certificate in Education from Holly Bank College of Education, today part of the University of Huddersfield. Wakefield then taught as a lecturer at Solihull College, Warrington Collegiate, The Open University and then Wakefield College from 1983 to 2003.

== Political career ==
Wakefield, then named Keith Sturgess, was first elected to Leeds City Council to represent the Barwick and Kippax ward in 1988. He had changed his surname to Wakefield when he ran for re-election in 1992 and served as a councillor for the ward for a total of 16 years. After his ward was abolished in a boundary review prior to the 2004 council election, Wakefield then represented the new ward of Kippax and Methley for 14 years before his retirement in 2019.

He also served as a Deputy Leader of the Council and majority Labour Party Group from 2001 to 2003.

Wakefield was later elected to as Leader of the Labour Group and Council Leader in May 2003. His predecessor, Brian Walker, had lost his council seat at the 2003 council election.

In May 2004, Wakefield oversaw the loss of 12 of 52 Labour councillors in the full council election in 2004. Subsequently, with the loss of the Labour majority, Liberal Democrat and Conservative councillors agreed a formal coalition to run the council. Wakefield continued to lead the Labour Group and became the Leader of the Opposition for the next six years.

Following the 2010 council election, with the Labour Party two seats short of a majority, the two incumbent Green Party councillors officially supported the creation of a Labour minority administration, led by Wakefield, in a confidence-and-supply agreement. It concluded when the Labour Party gained majority control of the council in 2011.

Wakefield's second term as Council Leader included introducing and implementing multi-million pound council spending cuts resulting from the UK government's austerity programme, the construction of the First Direct Arena, and the selection of Leeds as the host city for the opening ceremony and Grand Départ of the 2014 Tour de France.

On 29 April 2015, Wakefield announced his intention to stand down as Leader of the Labour Group and council after the May 2015 council election. Judith Blake, who had served as one of his two Deputy Leaders since 2010, was elected to lead the Labour Group on 11 May and as Council Leader on 21 May.

He then chaired the West Yorkshire Combined Authority Transport Committee from 2015 to 28 June 2018, having been a committee member since its creation in 2014. For his final year as a councillor, Wakefield held a junior position in the council administration as Deputy Executive Member for Adult Social Care and Health & Training and Skills.

== Personal life and death ==
Wakefield had three children and was married and separated twice.

Wakefield died in Leeds on 19 September 2026, aged 78.

== Honours ==
Wakefield was appointed as an Officer of the Order of the British Empire (OBE) in the 2016 New Year Honours. He also received an honorary doctorate from Leeds Beckett University in July 2019 and, after his retirement from Leeds City Council, was created an honorary alderman of the City of Leeds in January 2020.
