= Michael McGowan (politician) =

British politician (born 1940)

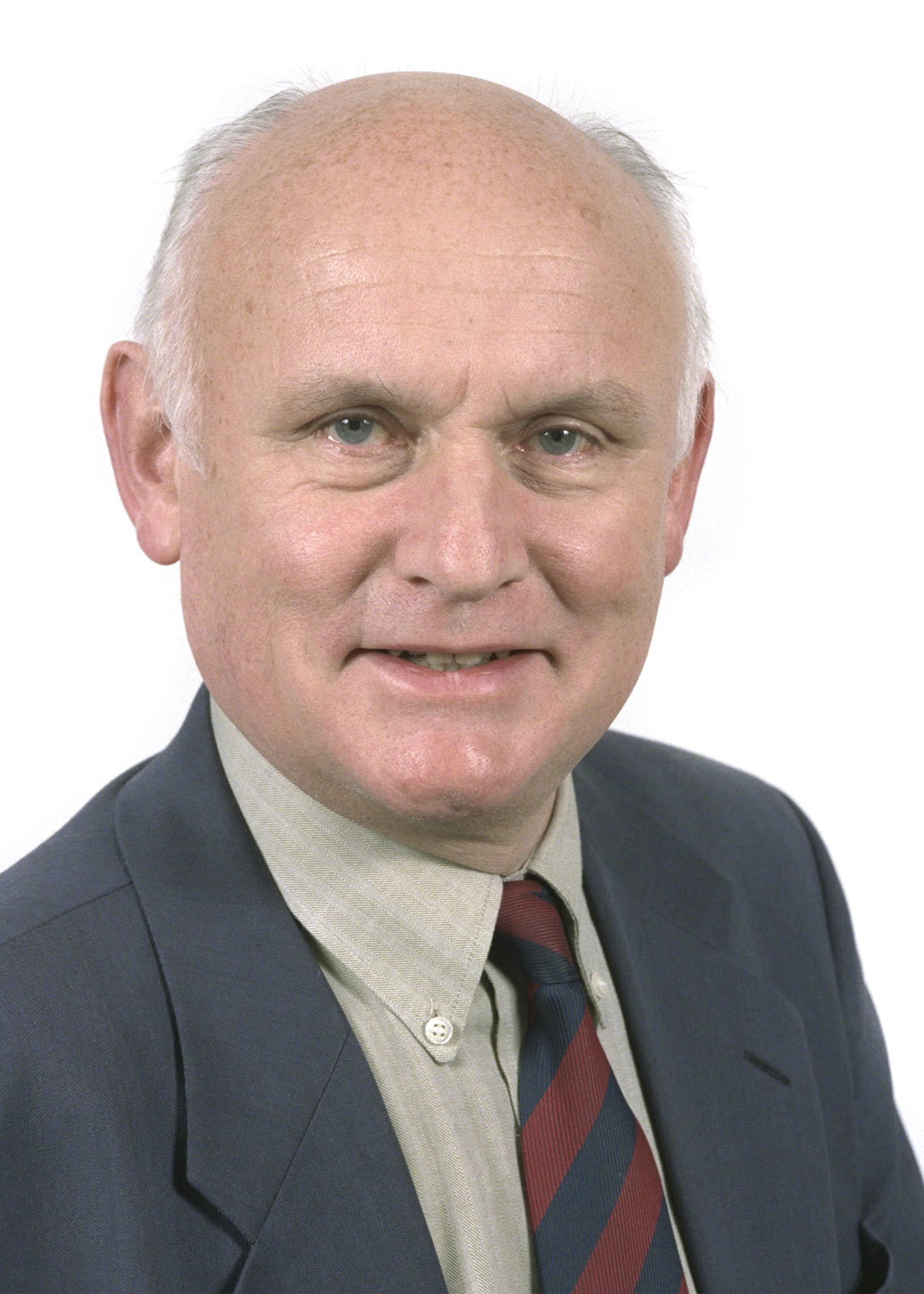
- McGowan in 1994

Member of the European Parliament for Leeds
- In office 17 June 1984 – 10 June 1999
- Preceded by: Derek Enright
- Succeeded by: Constituency abolished

Leeds City Councillor for University Ward
- In office 8 June 2001 – 2004
- Preceded by: Maggie Giles-Hill
- Succeeded by: Ward abolished

Leeds City Councillor for Beeston Ward
- In office 1980–1984
- Preceded by: Ward created
- Succeeded by: Jon Trickett

Personal details
- Born: Michael McGowan; 19 May 1940 (age 86) Birkenshaw, United Kingdom
- Party: Labour
- Other political affiliations: Co-operative
- Spouse: Margarita
- Children: 3
- Education: Leicester University
- Occupation: Journalist

Michael McGowan (born 19 May 1940) is a British journalist and a former Member of the European Parliament, with a special interest in international affairs, European politics, Africa, peace, development, and human rights. He is a Director of Leeds City Credit Union, and a Director of PAFRAS – Positive Action for Refugees and Asylum Seekers, and until June 2009 was a National Executive Committee member of the Co-operative Party.

== Early life and career ==
Michael McGowan was born in the village of Birkenshaw in the West Riding of Yorkshire. His father, Edgar, was a baker at Bradford Co-op bakery and his mother, Marion, a waitress.

McGowan was educated at Birkenshaw Primary school, Heckmondwike Grammar School, and won a West Riding scholarship to Leicester University where he read History, philosophy, Politics, and Economics. He is married to Margarita and they have three grown up children, Joseph, Emily, and Sebastian. The couple live in Leeds.

== Political career ==
Michael McGowan was elected a Labour Party District Councillor at the age of 21, a West Riding County Councillor at 23, and has served for two periods on Leeds City Council. He was Labour candidate for Ripon in 1966 and for Brighouse and Spenborough in 1979.

A former BBC Television and Radio producer based in Leeds, Bristol and at the Television Centre, London, McGowan is a member of the National Union of Journalists.

=== European Parliament ===
In June 1984, having secured the nomination by defeating the sitting Member of the European Parliament, Derek Enright, McGowan was elected as the Labour MEP for Leeds, serving three terms in the parliament before he stood down in 1999. During those fifteen years, he served on the Foreign Affairs, Human Rights, and External Trade committees of the European Parliament and as Vice-President of the ACP EU Joint Parliamentary Assembly which links the European Union with the countries of the African, Caribbean and Pacific Group of States.

McGowan has been a member of delegations to 37 African countries and was an EU election observer in Chad, Guinea, and Nigeria. He was a United Nations election observer at the Namibian independence elections in November 1989 and the first democratic elections in South Africa in 1994, when he was based in Durban. The South African city has since been twinned with Leeds, which Nelson Mandela visited and where he was made an honorary citizen.

Michael McGowan is the only British MEP to be elected President of the Development and Co-operation Committee of the European Parliament, a position also held by the former French Prime Minister, Michel Rocard, and the present French Foreign Minister, Bernard Kouchner.

== Journalist ==
In two op-ed pieces published in The Yorkshire Post during 2009, Michael McGowan has raised a number of controversial issues. One article called for an urgent independent inquiry led by the United Nations into the Lockerbie disaster. McGowan wrote that he was personally affected by the crash: "As President of the Development Committee of the European Parliament, I had invited Bernt Carlsson, the Assistant Secretary-General of the United Nations and UN Commissioner for Namibia, to call in at Brussels in December 1988. That Bernt Carlsson was on that plane should be an extra incentive for the UN to take action in view of the fact that this impressive diplomat was dealing with some of the most sensitive and violent situations being perpetrated by the brutal apartheid regime in both South Africa and Namibia, besides his work in the Middle East. The best tribute to the lives and families of the 270 victims of Lockerbie, including Bernt Carlsson, and the most positive action for the international community to take against terrorism, is to launch an independent inquiry into this gross act of mass murder. Nothing less will suffice."

The second article by McGowan expressed the hope that Ireland would vote against ratifying the Lisbon Treaty, thus frustrating Tony Blair's ambitions to become President of the European Council. McGowan, fearing that ratification would nonetheless go ahead, argued in favour of a different British candidate for the presidency: Chris Patten, "who has to be rated as one of the more heavyweight and internationally respected UK politicians of recent times. His experience as a UK Government Minister, as European Commissioner for External Affairs with responsibility for international development, and the last Governor of Hong Kong would make him a serious candidate. The appointment of Chris Patten as the first President of the European Union would be good for Britain, good for Europe and good for the developing world. It would also signal a determination that Britain intends to play a greater part at the heart of Europe."
