= 2023 Leeds City Council election =

English local election on 4 May

- 4 May 2023

33 of 99 seats on Leeds City Council 50 seats needed for a majority
- Turnout: 31.17% (▼2.53%)
	First party	Second party	Third party
Leader	James Lewis	Andrew Carter
Party	Labour	Conservative	Liberal Democrats
Last election	22 seats, 44.1%	6 seats, 27.0%	2 seats, 9.4%
Seats before	56	21	7
Seats won	22	4	2
Seats after	61	18	6
Seat change	▲3	▼3	▼1
Popular vote	81,752	41,078	19,508
Percentage	44.4%	22.3%	10.6%
Swing	▲0.3pp	▼4.7pp	▲1.2pp
	Fourth party	Fifth party	Sixth party
Party	Morley Borough Independents	Green	Garforth and Swillington Independents
Last election	2 seats, 2.6%	1 seats, 11.4%	1 seat, 2.1%
Seats before	6	4 (Note: Labour councillor, Lou Cunningham (Armley), resigned from the party and joined the Green Party on 17 December 2022. On 17 October, Cunningham had announced she would not be seeking re-selection as the Labour candidate for the ward. Upon her defection, Cunningham confirmed her intention to stand for re-election in 2023 as the Green Party's candidate.)	3
Seats won	2	1	1
Seats after	6	3	3
Seat change	Steady	Steady	Steady
Popular vote	4,542	26,195	3,469
Percentage	2.5%	14.2%	1.9%
Swing	▼0.1pp	▲2.8pp	▼0.2pp
	Seventh party
Party	SDP
Last election	1 seat, 1.5%
Seats before	1
Seats won	1
Seats after	2
Seat change	▲1
Popular vote	2,622
Percentage	1.4%
Swing	▼0.1pp
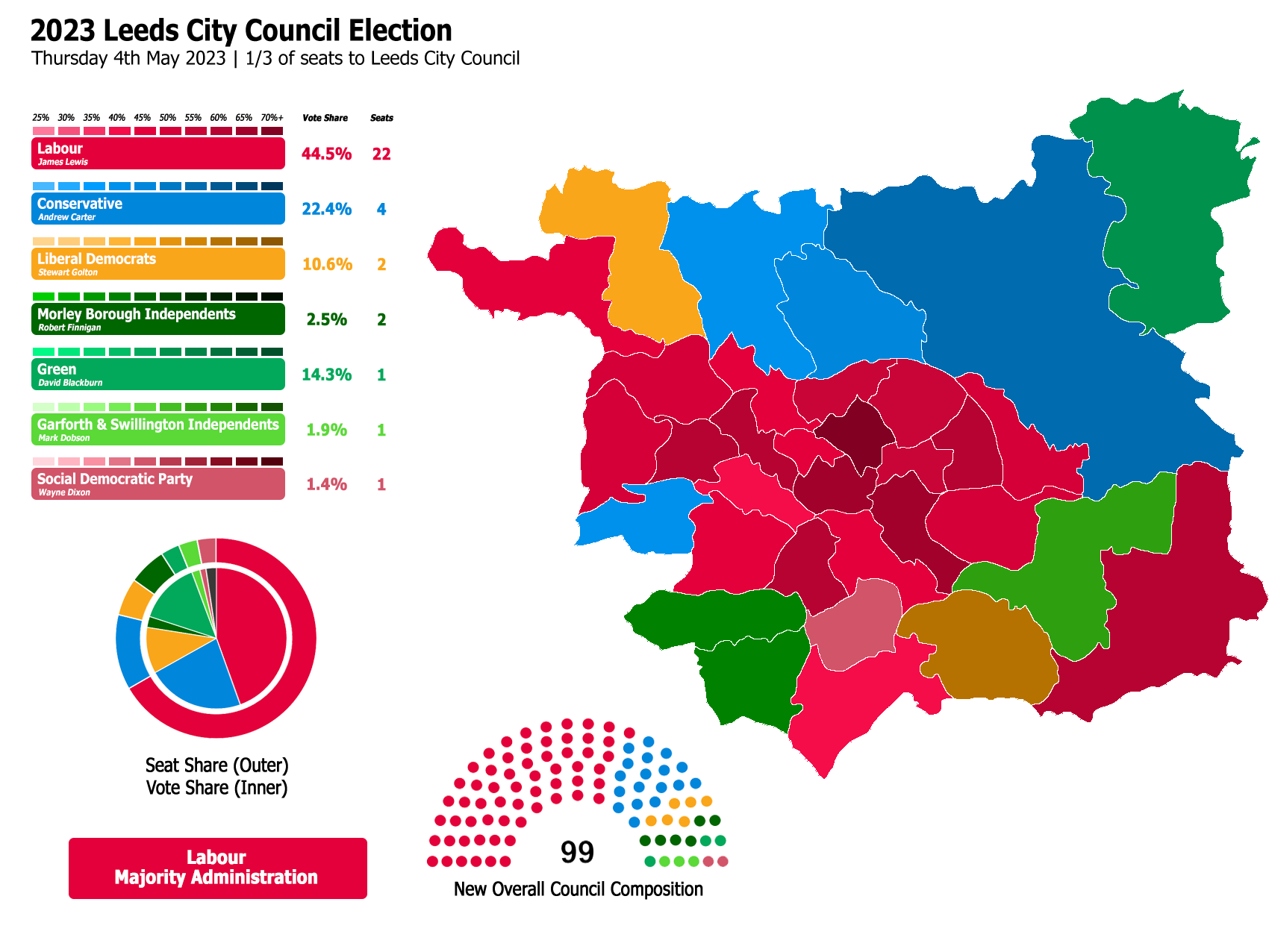
- Map of the results of the election by ward
Leader before election
James Lewis
Labour
Leader after election
James Lewis
Labour

The 2023 Leeds City Council election took place on Thursday 4 May 2023 to elect members of Leeds City Council in England. It was held on the same day as other local elections across the United Kingdom.

The 2023 elections were the first to be held following the introduction of Voter ID requirements for those voting in person at polling stations across the entire country. The council announced that a total of 225 voters were turned away from the polls for a lack of ID and did not return.

As per the election cycle, one third of the council's 99 seats were contested.

The Labour Party maintained their majority control of the council, repeating the net gain of 3 seats they achieved in 2022. The Social Democratic Party were the only party to gain a seat from Labour, winning their second council seat in Middleton Park.

As a result of Labour gaining Weetwood, the Liberal Democrats were no longer the clear third party on the council for the first time, equalling the 6 seats of the Morley Borough Independents.

== Election summary ==
Leeds City Council Election Result 2023
Party	Candidates						Votes		
Party	Stood	Elected	Gained	Unseated	Net	% of total	%	No.	Net %
Labour	33	22	4	1	▲3	66.7	44.4	81,752	+0.3
Conservative	33	4	0	3	▼3	12.1	22.3	41,078	-4.7
Green	33	1	1	1	Steady	3.0	14.2	26,195	+2.8
Liberal Democrats	33	2	0	1	▼1	6.1	10.6	19,508	+1.2
Morley Borough Independent	2	2	0	0	Steady	6.1	2.5	4,542	-0.1
Garforth and Swillington Independents	1	1	0	0	Steady	3.0	1.9	3,428	-0.2
SDP	13	1	1	0	▲1	3.0	1.4	2,622	-0.1
Yorkshire	8	0	0	0	Steady	0.0	1.1	2,072	+0.1
Independent	6	0	0	0	Steady	0.0	0.4	713	+0.2
Reform	3	0	0	0	Steady	0.0	0.4	654	New
TUSC	7	0	0	0	Steady	0.0	0.3	515	+0.1
Alliance for Green Socialism	1	0	0	0	Steady	0.0	0.1	183	-0.2
Breakthrough Party	1	0	0	0	Steady	0.0	0.1	156	New
NIP	1	0	0	0	Steady	0.0	0.0	52	-0.1
Total	175	33	6	6	Steady	100.0	100.0	184,242 (Note: Total votes includes 772 blank and invalid votes.)	

The election result had the following consequences for the political composition of the council:

Party	2022 election	Prior to election	New council
Labour	58	56	61
Conservative	21	21	18
Liberal Democrat	7	7	6
Morley Borough Independents	6	6	6
Green	3	4 (Note: Labour councillor, Lou Cunningham (Armley), resigned from the party and joined the Green Party on 17 December 2022. On 17 October, Cunningham had announced she would not be seeking re-selection as the Labour candidate for the ward. Upon her defection, Cunningham confirmed her intention to stand for re-election in 2023 as the Green Party's candidate.)	3
Garforth and Swillington Independents	3	3	3
SDP	1	1	2
Vacant	0	1 (Note: Labour councillor, Neil Walshaw (Headingley and Hyde Park), resigned from his council seat on 13 January 2023. Walshaw had previously announced his intention to not stand for re-election in 2023 on 10 October 2022.)	0
Total	99	99	99
Working majority	17	14	23

== Councillors who did not stand for re-election ==
Councillor/s who did not stand for re-election (9)
Councillor	Ward	First elected	Party	Reason	Successor
Ann Forsaith	Farnley and Wortley	2019	Green	stood down	Adrian McCluskey (Labour)
Peter Harrand	Alwoodley	1990	Conservative	stood down	Lyn Buckley (Conservative)
John Illingworth	Kirkstall	1976	Labour	stood down	Andy Rontree (Labour)
Kamila Maqsood	Gipton and Harehills	2010	Labour	stood down	Asghar Ali (Labour)
Mirelle Midgley	Kippax and Methley	2019	Labour	stood down	Michael Millar (Labour)
Lisa Mulherin	Ardsley and Robin Hood	2004	Labour	stood down	Stephen Holroyd-Case (Labour)
Denise Ragan	Burmantofts and Richmond Hill	2016	Labour	stood down	Nkele Manaka (Labour)
Paul Truswell	Middleton Park	1982, 2012	Labour	stood down	Emma Pogson-Golden (SDP)
Neil Walshaw	Headingley and Hyde Park	2011	Labour	resigned office	Abdul Hannan (Labour)

Incumbent Labour councillor, Julie Heselwood, stood successfully in the Weetwood ward. She did not stand for re-election in Bramley and Stanningley.

== Results by ward ==
=== Adel & Wharfedale ===
Adel & Wharfedale
Party	Candidate	Votes	%	±%
Conservative	Billy Flynn*	3,087	43.8	−12.5
Labour Co-op	Steve Clapcote	2,064	29.3	+2.3
Liberal Democrats	Sharon Slinger	1,343	19.1	+10.6
Green	Fiona Love	554	7.9	+1.7
Majority		1,023	14.5	−14.8
Turnout		7,076	42.6	−4.7
Conservative hold		Swing		

=== Alwoodley ===
Alwoodley
Party	Candidate	Votes	%	±%
Conservative	Lyn Buckley	3,253	49.8	−10.5
Labour	Jackie Ellis	2,350	36.0	+7.7
Liberal Democrats	Jared Levy	419	6.3	+2.5
Green	Louise Jennings	340	5.2	+1.4
Yorkshire	Howard Dews	164	2.5	+0.7
Majority		903	13.8	−18.2
Turnout		6,541	37.3	−4.9
Conservative hold		Swing		

=== Ardsley & Robin Hood ===
Ardsley & Robin Hood
Party	Candidate	Votes	%	±%
Labour Co-op	Stephen Holroyd-Case	2,284	43.5	−1.8
Liberal Democrats	Tom Leadley	1,338	25.5	+19.2
Conservative	Lalit Suryawanshi	1,237	23.6	−15.9
Green	Leon Zadok	254	4.8	−1.6
SDP	Daniel Whetstone	101	1.9	+0.1
Majority		946	18.0	+12.3
Turnout		5,249	29.6	−2.4
Labour hold		Swing		

=== Armley ===
Armley
Party	Candidate	Votes	%	±%
Labour	Andy Parnham	1,897	44.1	−17.9
Green	Lou Cunningham*	1,712	39.8	+24.8
Conservative	Tamas Kovacs	419	9.7	−5.9
Yorkshire	Edana McDonald	129	3.0	N/A
Liberal Democrats	Dan Walker	105	2.4	−2.4
Independent	Jim Miller	39	0.9	N/A
Majority		185	4.3	−42.2
Turnout		4,316	24.9	±0.0
Labour hold		Swing		

=== Beeston & Holbeck ===
Beeston & Holbeck
Party	Candidate	Votes	%	±%
Labour	Andrew Scopes*	2,494	62.9	+15.7
Green	Mariana Polucciu	662	16.7	−5.5
Conservative	Muhammad Azeem	450	11.3	−5.6
Liberal Democrats	Peter Andrews	209	5.3	+1.2
SDP	Nigel Perry	107	2.7	−3.0
TUSC	Katherine Gwyther	44	1.1	N/A
Majority		1,832	46.2	+21.1
Turnout		3,996	21.4	−2.6
Labour hold		Swing		

=== Bramley & Stanningley ===
Bramley & Stanningley
Party	Candidate	Votes	%	±%
Labour	Tom Hinchcliffe	2,662	62.2	−6.0
Conservative	Adam Cook	696	16.3	−1.0
Liberal Democrats	Elizabeth Bee	479	11.2	+4.1
Green	Keith Whittaker	384	9.0	+2.9
SDP	Richard Riley	62	1.4	+1.3
Majority		1,966	45.9	−5.0
Turnout		4,319	25.1	−2.5
Labour hold		Swing		

=== Burmantofts & Richmond Hill ===
Burmantofts & Richmond Hill
Party	Candidate	Votes	%	±%
Labour	Nkele Manaka	2,547	66.8	+0.2
Green	Rebwar Sharazur	410	10.8	+4.2
Liberal Democrats	David Hollingsworth	392	10.3	+3.0
Conservative	Taiwo Adeyemi	294	7.7	−2.8
TUSC	Richard Chaves-Sanderson	88	2.3	N/A
SDP	Paul Whetstone	59	1.5	N/A
Majority		2,137	56.1	±0.0
Turnout		3,811	22.4	−1.0
Labour hold		Swing		

=== Calverley & Farsley ===
Calverley & Farsley
Party	Candidate	Votes	%	±%
Labour Co-op	Peter Carlill*	3,926	54.6	+11.8
Conservative	Jas Singh	2,536	35.3	−11.4
Green	Ellen Graham	251	3.5	−0.7
Yorkshire	Robert Lees	250	3.5	+0.5
Liberal Democrats	Stuart McLeod	205	2.9	−0.1
Majority		1,390	19.3	+15.4
Turnout		7,186	38.9	−2.4
Labour hold		Swing		

=== Chapel Allerton ===
Chapel Allerton
Party	Candidate	Votes	%	±%
Labour	Jane Dowson*	4,505	73.4	−0.4
Green	Bobak Walker	721	11.8	+0.8
Conservative	Safaraz Ahad	390	6.4	−1.3
Liberal Democrats	Aqila Choudhury	246	4.0	−0.4
Alliance for Green Socialism	Mike Davies	183	3.0	−0.1
SDP	Sasha Watson	48	0.8	N/A
Majority		3,784	61.7	−1.1
Turnout		6,134	33.2	−0.8
Labour hold		Swing		

=== Cross Gates & Whinmoor ===
Cross Gates & Whinmoor
Party	Candidate	Votes	%	±%
Labour	Jess Lennox*	2,823	53.6	+2.4
Conservative	John Kennedy	1,557	29.5	−4.4
Independent	Mark Nicholson	339	6.4	N/A
Green	Martin Hemingway	302	5.7	−1.3
Liberal Democrats	Patricia Cooper	233	4.4	−3.0
Majority		1,266	24.0	+6.7
Turnout		5,271	28.8	−2.0
Labour hold		Swing		

=== Farnley & Wortley ===
Farnley & Wortley
Party	Candidate	Votes	%	±%
Labour	Adrian McCluskey	2,438	48.9	+1.1
Green	Mark Rollinson	1,648	33.1	−0.8
Conservative	Natalia Armitage	538	10.8	−7.1
Reform	Andrea Whitehead	201	4.0	N/A
Liberal Democrats	Christine Golton	65	1.3	N/A
Independent	Bev Lockwood	61	1.2	N/A
SDP	Jack Bellfield	17	0.3	N/A
Majority		790	15.8	+1.9
Turnout		4,985	27.3	−2.2
Labour gain from Green		Swing		

=== Garforth & Swillington ===
Garforth & Swillington
Party	Candidate	Votes	%	±%
Garforth and Swillington Independents	Suzanne McCormack*	3,428	54.0	−9.0
Labour	Luke Murrow	1,257	19.8	+4.3
Conservative	Peter Bentley	912	14.4	−1.5
Green	Stephen Beer	384	6.1	+2.5
Liberal Democrats	Jake Knox	195	3.1	+1.5
Independent	Tyler Wilson-Kerr	152	2.4	N/A
Majority		2,171	34.2	−12.9
Turnout		6,347	39.2	−4.7
Garforth and Swillington Independents hold		Swing		

=== Gipton & Harehills ===
Gipton & Harehills
Party	Candidate	Votes	%	±%
Labour	Asghar Ali	2,655	55.9	−4.6
Green	Mothin Ali	1,484	31.2	+8.9
Conservative	Robert Harris	310	6.9	−3.2
Liberal Democrats	Mark Twitchett	156	3.3	−1.3
TUSC	Iain Dalton	121	2.5	+0.7
Majority		1,171	24.6	−13.7
Turnout		4,751	26.5	+1.2
Labour hold		Swing		

=== Guiseley & Rawdon ===
Guiseley & Rawdon
Party	Candidate	Votes	%	±%
Labour Co-op	Oliver Edwards	3,678	46.8	−1.0
Conservative	Paul Wadsworth*	2,934	37.3	+0.8
Yorkshire	Bob Buxton	591	7.5	−1.0
Green	Lucy Wheeler	345	4.4	+0.9
Liberal Democrats	Robert Jacques	293	3.7	+0.3
Majority		744	9.5	−1.8
Turnout		7,857	42.2	−2.3
Labour gain from Conservative		Swing		

=== Harewood ===
Harewood
Party	Candidate	Votes	%	±%
Conservative	Ryan Stephenson*	3,708	59.6	−1.8
Labour	Oliver Gill	1,459	23.5	+1.0
Green	Claire Evans	627	10.0	+1.0
Liberal Democrats	Dan Cook	406	6.5	−0.2
Majority		2,249	36.2	−2.7
Turnout		6,217	41.6	−2.6
Conservative hold		Swing		

=== Headingley & Hyde Park ===
Headingley & Hyde Park
Party	Candidate	Votes	%	±%
Labour	Abdul Hannan	2,029	48.5	−5.6
Green	Tim Goodall	1,749	41.8	+6.8
Liberal Democrats	Brandon Ashford	145	3.5	−0.9
Conservative	Andrew Martin	119	2.8	−0.7
NIP	Molly Tindle	52	1.2	N/A
TUSC	Florian Hynam	48	1.1	+0.9
Independent	Anthony Greaux	27	0.6	−0.2
Majority		280	6.7	−12.3
Turnout		4,185	17.6	+0.9
Labour hold		Swing		

=== Horsforth ===
Horsforth
Party	Candidate	Votes	%	±%
Labour	Raymond Jones	3,810	51.4	+6.7
Conservative	Jackie Shemilt*	2,302	31.0	−4.2
Green	Ian Shaw	581	7.8	+0.3'"`UNIQ−−ref−000000B9−QINU`"'
Liberal Democrats	James Spencer	483	6.5	−10.5
Yorkshire	Ian Cowling	241	3.2	−1.1
Majority		1,508	20.2	+10.6
Turnout		7,448	41.6	−0.7
Labour gain from Conservative		Swing		

=== Hunslet & Riverside ===
Hunslet & Riverside
Party	Candidate	Votes	%	±%
Labour	Paul Wray*	2,095	48.4	+7.8
Green	Omar Mushtaq	1,809	41.8	+1.2
Conservative	Owen Rutherford	231	5.3	±0.0
Liberal Democrats	Benedict Turner-Chastney	89	2.1	+1.0
SDP	Thomas Foster	48	1.1	+0.4
TUSC	Oisín Duncan	27	0.6	N/A
Majority		286	6.6	−3.7
Turnout		4,330	24.3	−2.9
Labour hold		Swing		

=== Killingbeck & Seacroft ===
Killingbeck & Seacroft
Party	Candidate	Votes	%	±%
Labour	Katie Dye*	2,446	64.1	+2.7
Conservative	Bradley Chandler	676	17.7	−2.0
Green	David Anthoney	369	9.7	+2.5
Liberal Democrats	John Otley	295	7.7	+2.1
Majority		1,770	46.4	+4.5
Turnout		3,814	20.8	−1.8
Labour hold		Swing		

=== Kippax & Methley ===
Kippax & Methley
Party	Candidate	Votes	%	±%
Labour	Michael Millar	3,163	60.1	−3.0
Conservative	Connor Mulhall	1,362	25.9	−0.7
Green	Alan Martin	406	7.7	+2.0
Liberal Democrats	Lesley McIntee	301	5.7	+1.6
Majority		1,801	34.2	−2.4
Turnout		5,263	30.1	−3.6
Labour hold		Swing		

=== Kirkstall ===
Kirkstall
Party	Candidate	Votes	%	±%
Labour	Andy Rontree	3,018	64.0	−3.1
Green	Victoria Smith	886	18.8	+2.8
Conservative	Reiss Capitano	402	8.5	−1.7
Liberal Democrats	Adam Belcher	288	6.1	+0.3
Independent	Stuart Long	95	2.0	N/A
Majority		2,132	42.2	−8.9
Turnout		4,718	29.2	−1.6
Labour hold		Swing		

=== Little London & Woodhouse ===
Little London & Woodhouse
Party	Candidate	Votes	%	±%
Labour Co-op	Abigail Marshall Katung*	1,908	66.3	−5.4
Green	Nick Lalvani	437	15.2	+0.9
Conservative	Muhammad Raja	261	9.1	+1.9
Liberal Democrats	Katherine Arbuckle	163	5.7	+1.7
TUSC	Anthony Bracuti	96	3.3	+1.1
Majority		1,471	51.1	−6.4
Turnout		2,880	17.7	+1.4
Labour hold		Swing		

=== Middleton Park ===
Middleton Park
Party	Candidate	Votes	%	±%
SDP	Emma Pogson-Golden	1,985	45.9	−4.6
Labour Co-op	Lauren Summers	1,587	36.7	+0.7
Conservative	Samson Adeyemi	376	8.7	+1.0
Green	Eunice Agbemafle	186	4.3	+0.4
TUSC	Joelle Donaldson	91	2.1	N/A
Liberal Democrats	Jude Arbuckle	86	2.0	+0.5
Majority		398	13.8	−0.8
Turnout		4,320	21.4	−4.9
SDP gain from Labour		Swing		

=== Moortown ===
Moortown
Party	Candidate	Votes	%	±%
Labour Co-op	Mohammed Shahzad*	3,938	57.5	+0.9
Conservative	Lee Farmer	1,210	17.7	−1.3
Green	Rachel Hartshorne	892	13.0	−2.2
Liberal Democrats	George Sykes	557	8.1	−1.5
Yorkshire	David Stephens	226	3.3	N/A
Majority		2,728	39.8	+3.2
Turnout		6,848	39.4	−1.7
Labour hold		Swing		

=== Morley North ===
Morley North
Party	Candidate	Votes	%	±%
Morley Borough Independents	Robert Finnigan*	2,448	43.6	−6.8
Labour Co-op	Patrick Davey	1,400	24.9	+2.6
Conservative	Dom Eatwell	848	15.1	−2.0
Liberal Democrats	James Trueman	323	5.7	+4.1
Green	Rebecca Kellett	313	5.6	−2.6
Reform	Jonathan Thackray	252	4.5	N/A
SDP	Richard Cowles	25	0.4	N/A
Majority		1,048	18.6	−9.4
Turnout		5,620	30.7	−3.0
Morley Borough Independents hold		Swing		

=== Morley South ===
Morley South
Party	Candidate	Votes	%	±%
Morley Borough Independents	Wyn Kidger*	2,094	41.4	+1.8
Labour	Bailey Bradley	1,510	29.8	−0.4
Conservative	Charles George	749	14.8	−4.8
Green	Chris Bell	450	8.9	+0.9
Liberal Democrats	Mihai Barticel	191	3.8	+1.5
SDP	Andrew Martin	41	0.8	N/A
Majority		584	11.5	+2.1
Turnout		5,062	27.7	−4.5
Morley Borough Independents hold		Swing		

=== Otley & Yeadon ===
Otley & Yeadon
Party	Candidate	Votes	%	±%
Liberal Democrats	Ryk Downes*	3,189	45.3	−1.7
Labour Co-op	Ian McCargo	1,727	24.5	+2.0
Green	Mick Bradley	946	13.4	+1.1
Conservative	Stewart Harper	791	11.2	−1.3
Yorkshire	Claire Buxton	197	2.8	−2.6
Breakthrough Party	Elliot Nathan	156	2.2	N/A
Majority		1,462	20.8	−3.7
Turnout		7,037	38.5	+6.3
Liberal Democrats hold		Swing		

=== Pudsey ===
Pudsey
Party	Candidate	Votes	%	±%
Conservative	Trish Smith*	3,050	44.1	−10.9
Labour	Riaz Ahmed	2,891	41.8	+4.6
Green	Alaric Hall	398	5.8	−0.7
Liberal Democrats	Christine Glover	352	5.1	+2.3
Reform	Tom Kelly	201	2.9	N/A
Majority		159	2.3	−15.1
Turnout		6,919	36.2	−3.6
Conservative hold		Swing		

=== Rothwell ===
Rothwell
Party	Candidate	Votes	%	±%
Liberal Democrats	Diane Chapman*	3,409	61.4	+7.1
Labour	James Driver	1,200	21.6	−6.9
Conservative	Babatunde Gbolade	372	6.7	−5.4
Yorkshire	Sean McDonald	274	4.9	+2.1
Green	Tim Moorson	260	4.7	+2.5
SDP	Sarah Welbourne	21	0.4	N/A
Majority		2,209	39.8	+14.0
Turnout		5,552	35.1	−3.0
Liberal Democrats hold		Swing		

=== Roundhay ===
Roundhay
Party	Candidate	Votes	%	±%
Labour Co-op	Jordan Bowden*	3,758	55.7	−5.0
Green	Paul Ellis	1,475	21.9	−2.2
Conservative	Shazar Ahad	992	14.7	−6.0
Liberal Democrats	Darren Finlay	482	7.1	−6.6
Majority		2,283	33.9	−2.8
Turnout		6,742	38.1	−1.1
Labour hold		Swing		

=== Temple Newsam ===
Temple Newsam
Party	Candidate	Votes	%	±%
Labour	Nicole Sharpe*	2,632	51.8	+2.2
Conservative	Cormac Trigg	1,647	32.4	−7.5
Liberal Democrats	Keith Norman	376	7.4	+2.2
Green	Geraldine Turver	331	6.5	+1.7
SDP	Wendy Whetstone	61	1.2	N/A
Majority		985	19.4	+9.7
Turnout		5,077	30.3	−5.0
Labour hold		Swing		

=== Weetwood ===
Weetwood
Party	Candidate	Votes	%	±%
Labour Co-op	Jools Heselwood (Note: Incumbent Labour councillor, Jools Heselwood, has been selected to stand in Weetwood ward. She will not stand for re-election in Bramley and Stanningley.)	3,103	46.6	−2.3
Liberal Democrats	Chris Howley*	2,534	38.1	+5.0
Green	Christopher Foren	550	8.3	−0.2
Conservative	Angelo Basu	411	6.2	−2.2
SDP	Rob Walker	47	0.7	−0.1
Majority		569	8.5	−7.4
Turnout		6,657	42.2	−0.4
Labour gain from Liberal Democrats		Swing		

=== Wetherby ===
Wetherby
Party	Candidate	Votes	%	±%
Green	Penny Stables	4,079	52.9	+18.5
Conservative	Linda Richards*	2,958	38.3	−8.7
Labour Co-op	Lucy Nuttgens	498	6.5	−5.2
Liberal Democrats	James Prince	161	2.1	−4.4
Majority		1,121	14.5	+1.8
Turnout		7,714	46.1	+1.2
Green gain from Conservative		Swing		
