= Hunslet and Riverside (ward) =

Electoral ward in Leeds, England

- Hunslet and Riverside highlighted within Leeds
- Population: 17,795 (2023 electorate)
- Metropolitan borough: City of Leeds
- Metropolitan county: West Yorkshire
- Region: Yorkshire and the Humber
- Country: England
- Sovereign state: United Kingdom
- UK Parliament: Leeds South
- Councillors: Ed Carlisle (Green); Mohammed Iqbal (Labour); Paul Wray (Labour)

Hunslet and Riverside is an electoral ward of Leeds City Council in Leeds, West Yorkshire, largely covering the inner city area of Hunslet to the south of the city centre. It was created in advance of the 2018 council election.

Prior to the 2018 election, the predecessor ward most closely corresponding to Hunslet and Riverside was City and Hunslet ward, containing Leeds city centre since 2004. From 1980 to 2022, the councillors in these wards all belonged to the Labour Party. In May 2022, however, the ward elected a councillor from the Green Party; the same election saw a similar departure in the neighbouring ward of Middleton Park, which elected a councillor from the Social Democratic Party.

== Councillors since 1973 ==
Election	Councillor	Councillor	Councillor
Hunslet East and West (1973 to 1980)
1973	Denis Pedder (Lib)	J. Barrie (Lib)	David Austick (Lib) (Note: Austick was elected as the Member of Parliament for Ripon in a July 1973 by-election. He lost his seat in the February 1974 general election.)
1975	Denis Pedder (Lib)	J. Barrie (Lib)	M. Taylor (Lib)
1976	Denis Pedder (Lib)	Ivan Lester (Lib)	M. Taylor (Lib)
TBC	Denis Pedder (Ind) (Note: According to Michael Meadowcroft, on a date unconfirmed, Pedder was expelled from the Liberal Party after resigning as the party group's Chief Whip before a council meeting: "He immediately applied to join the Labour party. Labour, being conscious of Pedder's mercurial and sometimes capricious personality, delayed admitting him to membership and so he withdrew his application. He then contested Hunslet... as an independent [candidate]" in 1978.)	Ivan Lester (Lib)	M. Taylor (Lib)
1978	Geoff Driver (Lab)	Ivan Lester (Lib)	M. Taylor (Lib)
1979	Geoff Driver (Lab)	Ivan Lester (Lib)	Trevor Park (Lab)
Hunslet (1980 to 2004)
1980	Geoff Driver (Lab)	John Battle (Lab)	Trevor Park (Lab)
1982	Geoff Driver (Lab)	John Battle (Lab)	Trevor Park (Lab)
1983	Geoff Driver (Lab)	John Battle (Lab)	Trevor Park (Lab)
1984	Geoff Driver (Lab)	John Battle (Lab)	Trevor Park (Lab)
1986	Geoff Driver (Lab)	John Battle (Lab)	John Gunnell (Lab)
1987	Geoff Driver (Lab)	John Battle (Lab)	John Gunnell (Lab)
1988	Geoff Driver (Lab)	John Battle (Lab)	John Gunnell (Lab)
1990	Geoff Driver (Lab)	John Battle (Lab)	John Gunnell (Lab)
1991	Geoff Driver (Lab)	Ian Hugill (Lab)	John Gunnell (Lab)
1992	Geoff Driver (Lab)	Ian Hugill (Lab)	John Gunnell (Lab)
1994	Geoff Driver (Lab)	Ian Hugill (Lab)	Mark Davies (Lab)
1995	Geoff Driver (Lab)	John Erskine (Lab)	Mark Davies (Lab)
1996	Geoff Driver (Lab)	John Erskine (Lab)	Mark Davies (Lab)
1998	Geoff Driver (Lab)	John Erskine (Lab)	Mark Davies (Lab)
1999	Geoff Driver (Lab)	John Erskine (Lab)	Mark Davies (Lab)
2000	Geoff Driver (Lab)	John Erskine (Lab)	Mark Davies (Lab)
2002	Geoff Driver (Lab)	John Erskine (Lab)	Judith Blake (Lab) (Note: Blake was previously a Weetwood ward councillor from 1996 until she lost her seat in 2000.)
2003	Geoff Driver (Lab) (Note: Driver represented Middleton Park ward from 2004 to 2012.)	John Erskine (Lab)	Judith Blake (Lab) (Note: Blake went on to represent Middleton Park from 2004 to 2021.)
City and Hunslet (2004 to 2018)
2004	Elizabeth Nash (Lab) (Note: Nash had previously been a Kirkstall ward councillor from 1972 to 1988. She later won the 1989 City and Holbeck ward by-election and held the seat until 2004. Nash then represented City and Hunslet ward until the 2018 election.)	Patrick Davey (Lab)	Mohammed Iqbal (Lab) (Note: Iqbal had been a councillor for City and Holbeck ward from 1999 to 2004.)
2006	Elizabeth Nash (Lab)	Patrick Davey (Lab)	Mohammed Iqbal (Lab)
2007	Elizabeth Nash (Lab)	Patrick Davey (Lab)	Mohammed Iqbal (Lab)
2008	Elizabeth Nash (Lab)	Patrick Davey (Lab)	Mohammed Iqbal (Lab)
2010	Elizabeth Nash (Lab)	Patrick Davey (Lab)	Mohammed Iqbal (Lab)
2011	Elizabeth Nash (Lab)	Patrick Davey (Lab)	Mohammed Iqbal (Lab)
2012	Elizabeth Nash (Lab)	Patrick Davey (Lab)	Mohammed Iqbal (Lab)
2014	Elizabeth Nash (Lab)	Patrick Davey (Lab)	Mohammed Iqbal (Lab)
2015	Elizabeth Nash (Lab)	Patrick Davey (Lab)	Mohammed Iqbal (Lab)
2016	Elizabeth Nash (Lab)	Patrick Davey (Lab)	Mohammed Iqbal (Lab)
Hunslet and Riverside (2018 to present)
2018	Elizabeth Nash (Lab)	Paul Wray (Lab)	Mohammed Iqbal (Lab)
2019	Elizabeth Nash (Lab)	Paul Wray (Lab)	Mohammed Iqbal (Lab)
2021	Elizabeth Nash (Lab)	Paul Wray (Lab)	Mohammed Iqbal (Lab)
2022	Ed Carlisle (GPEW)	Paul Wray (Lab)	Mohammed Iqbal (Lab)
2023	Ed Carlisle (GPEW)	Paul Wray (Lab)	Mohammed Iqbal (Lab)
2024	Ed Carlisle (GPEW)	Paul Wray (Lab)	Mohammed Iqbal (Lab)
2026	Ed Carlisle* (GPEW)	Paul Wray* (Lab)	Mohammed Iqbal* (Lab)

indicates seat up for re-election. indicates councillor defection or change in party affiliation. * indicates current incumbent councillor.

== Elections since 2018 ==
=== May 2026 ===
2026
Party	Candidate	Votes	%	±%
Green	Ed Carlisle*	3,202	56.3	▲14.3
Labour Co-op	Sarata Sawo	1,422	25.0	▼21.2
Reform	Ayesha Shamim	700	12.3	N/A
Conservative	Taiwo Adeyemi	199	3.5	▼1.5
Liberal Democrats	Roderic Parker	112	2.0	▼1.8
SDP	Paul Thomas	57	1.0	▼1.2
Majority		1,780	31.3	▲27.1
Turnout		5,692	33.7	▲5.2
Green gain from Labour Co-op		Swing		

=== May 2024 ===
2024
Party	Candidate	Votes	%	±%
Labour	Mohammed Iqbal*	2,274	45.8	−2.6
Green	Omar Mushtaq	2,067	41.6	−0.2
Conservative	Tamas Kovacs	247	5.0	−0.3
Liberal Democrats	Benjamin Dale	185	3.7	+1.6
SDP	Daniel Whetstone	107	2.2	+1.1
TUSC	Oisín Duncan	43	0.9	+0.3
Majority		207	4.2	−2.4
Turnout		4,965	28.5	+4.2
Labour hold		Swing		

=== May 2023 ===
2023
Party	Candidate	Votes	%	±%
Labour	Paul Wray*	2,095	48.4	+7.8
Green	Omar Mushtaq	1,809	41.8	+1.2
Conservative	Owen Rutherford	231	5.3	±0.0
Liberal Democrats	Benedict Turner-Chastney	89	2.1	+1.0
SDP	Thomas Foster	48	1.1	+0.4
TUSC	Oisín Duncan	27	0.6	N/A
Majority		286	6.6	−3.7
Turnout		4,330	24.3	−2.9
Labour hold		Swing		

=== May 2022 ===
2022
Party	Candidate	Votes	%	±%
Green	Ed Carlisle	2,441	50.9	+9.2
Labour	Elizabeth Nash*	1,947	40.6	−5.2
Conservative	Samson Adeyemi	253	5.3	−2.9
Liberal Democrats	Benedict Turner-Chastney	53	1.1	−0.5
Freedom Alliance	Nick Cottle	42	0.9	N/A
SDP	Thomas Foster	33	0.7	−0.1
Majority		494	10.3	+6.1
Turnout		4,793	27.2	−4.3
Green gain from Labour		Swing		

=== May 2021 ===
2021
Party	Candidate	Votes	%	±%
Labour	Mohammed Iqbal*	2,535	45.8	−0.5
Green	Ed Carlisle	2,303	41.7	−1.2
Conservative	Paul Rowden	456	8.2	+2.5
Liberal Democrats	Benedict Turner-Chastney	90	1.6	−2.0
TUSC	Nina Brown	52	0.9	N/A
SDP	Cordelia Lynan	43	0.8	N/A
Majority		232	4.2	−1.8
Turnout		5,529	31.5	+5.9
Labour hold		Swing		

=== May 2019 ===
2019
Party	Candidate	Votes	%	±%
Labour	Paul Wray*	2,012	48.8	+1.4
Green	Ed Carlisle	1,766	42.9	+8.5
Conservative	Jordan Young	192	4.7	−3.4
Liberal Democrats	Benedict Turner-Chastney	149	3.6	+0.1
Majority		246	6	−7
Turnout		4,119	25.6	−1.8
Labour hold		Swing		

=== May 2018 ===
2018
Party	Candidate	Votes	%	±%
Labour	Elizabeth Nash*	2,399	47.4	N/A
Labour	Mohammed Iqbal*	2,391		
Labour	Paul Wray	2,132		
Green	Ed Carlisle	1,740	34.4	N/A
Green	Eunice Goncalves	1,024		
Green	Alaric Hall	931		
Conservative	Richard Salt	409	8.1	N/A
Conservative	Scott Smith	384		
Conservative	Michael Wheeler	342		
Independent	Kenny Saunders	340	6.7	N/A
Liberal Democrats	James Spencer	176	3.5	N/A
Majority		659	13.0	N/A
Turnout		16,702	27.4	N/A
Labour win (new seat)				
Labour win (new seat)				
Labour win (new seat)				

== Elections from 2004 to 2017 (City and Hunslet) ==
=== May 2016 ===
2016
Party	Candidate	Votes	%	±%
Labour	Elizabeth Nash*	2,483	49.1	+4.2
Green	Ed Carlisle	1,397	27.6	+4.8
Conservative	Amy Green	443	8.8	10.8
UKIP	Brian Weatherill	425	8.4	+1.5
Liberal Democrats	Jahangir Aziz	252	4.9	+0
TUSC	Mary Rosamund Finch	54	1.2	+1.2
Majority		1,086	21.5	−0.5
Turnout		5,054	25.9	
Labour hold		Swing		

=== May 2015 ===
2015
Party	Candidate	Votes	%	±%
Labour	Patrick Davey*	5,292	44.9	−4.3
Green	Ed Carlisle	2,694	22.8	+9.5
Conservative	Richard Salt	2,320	19.6	+6.9
UKIP	Khalil Kungulilo	808	6.9	−9.0
Liberal Democrats	Jahangir Aziz	573	4.9	−2.3
Monster Raving Loony	Christopher Worfolk	104	0.9	+0.9
Majority		2,598	22.0	−20.4
Turnout		11,791	53.9	
Labour hold		Swing	-20.3	

=== May 2014 ===
2014
Party	Candidate	Votes	%	±%
Labour	Mohammed Iqbal*	2,434	49.2	−18.2
UKIP	Nigel Buckland	785	15.9	+15.9
Green	Glen Jankowski	659	13.3	+4
Conservative	Richard Salt	631	12.7	−0.6
Liberal Democrats	Jahangir Aziz	354	7.2	−2.8
TUSC	Mary Finch	87	1.8	+1.8
Majority		1,649	33.3	
Turnout		4,950	22.84	
Labour hold		Swing		

=== May 2012 ===
2012
Party	Candidate	Votes	%	±%
Labour	Elizabeth Nash*	2,402	67.4	+4.7
Conservative	Matthew Wharton	473	13.3	−3.7
Liberal Democrats	Jahangir Aziz	357	10.0	−10.3
Green	Neil Seepujak	331	9.3	+9.3
Majority		1,929	54.1	+11.7
Turnout		3,563	16.9	
Labour hold		Swing	+4.2	

=== May 2011 ===
2011
Party	Candidate	Votes	%	±%
Labour	Patrick Davey*	3,230	62.7	+21.2
Liberal Democrats	Jahangir Aziz	1,047	20.3	−8.8
Conservative	Matthew Wharton	877	17.0	−0.3
Majority		2,183	42.4	+30.0
Turnout		5,154	25	
Labour hold		Swing	+15.0	

=== May 2010 ===
2010
Party	Candidate	Votes	%	±%
Labour	Mohammed Iqbal*	3,879	41.5	−5.3
Liberal Democrats	Jahangir Aziz	2,717	29.1	+15.6
Conservative	Nina Rosen	1,621	17.3	+2.5
BNP	Laura Meeson	638	6.8	−5.2
Green	Melanie Welsh	493	5.3	−0.1
Majority		1,162	12.4	−19.6
Turnout		9,348	49.1	+29.4
Labour hold		Swing	-10.4	

=== May 2008 ===
2008
Party	Candidate	Votes	%	±%
Labour	Elizabeth Nash*	1,697	46.8	+3.2
Conservative	Simon Harley	538	14.8	+8.3
Liberal Democrats	Pip Sadler	488	13.5	−1.1
BNP	John Atkinson	436	12.0	+0.4
Independent	Muserat Sujawal	272	7.5	+7.5
Green	Andy Parnham	193	5.3	−0.4
Majority		1,159	32.0	+3.0
Turnout		3,624	19.7	−2.7
Labour hold		Swing	-1.0	

=== May 2007 ===
2007
Party	Candidate	Votes	%	±%
Labour	Patrick Davey*	1,647	43.6	−3.3
Liberal Democrats	Paul Swain	552	14.6	−13.8
Respect	Muserat Sujawal	520	13.8	+7.5
BNP	John Atkinson	440	11.6	+11.6
Conservative	Syed Hassan-Shah	361	9.6	−1.3
Green	Michael Northfield	215	5.7	−1.8
Alliance for Green Socialism	Allan House	42	1.1	+1.1
Majority		1,095	29.0	+10.5
Turnout		3,777	22.4	−4.3
Labour hold		Swing	+5.2	

=== May 2006 ===
2006
Party	Candidate	Votes	%	±%
Labour	Mohammed Iqbal*	1,884	46.9	+5.2
Liberal Democrats	Paul Swain	1,143	28.5	+6.3
Conservative	Simon Church	437	10.9	−3.3
Green	Michael Northfield	300	7.5	−2.8
Respect	Sally Kincaid	252	6.3	+6.3
Majority		741	18.5	−1.0
Turnout		4,016	26.7	−3.7
Labour hold		Swing	-0.5	

=== May 2004 ===
2004
Party	Candidate	Votes	%	±%
Labour	Elizabeth Nash	1,651	41.7	N/A
Labour	Patrick Davey	1,611		
Labour	Mohammed Iqbal	1,578		
Liberal Democrats	James Monaghan	879	22.2	N/A
Liberal Democrats	Abul Kalam	839		
Liberal Democrats	John Clay	826		
Conservative	Simon Church	563	14.2	N/A
Conservative	Michael Wheeler	500		
Conservative	Douglas Phillips	488		
BNP	Bernard Allen	458	11.6	N/A
Green	Paul Marchant	408	10.3	N/A
Majority		772	19.5	N/A
Turnout		3,845	30.4	N/A
Labour win (new seat)				
Labour win (new seat)				
Labour win (new seat)				

== Elections from 1980 to 2003 (Hunslet) ==
=== 2003 ===
Election results in this section are as published by the Elections Centre.

2003
Party	Candidate	Votes	%	±%
Labour	John Erskine	1,264	63.3	−4.9
Liberal Democrats	Ann Norman	320	16.0	+2.5
Conservative	Anthony Larvin	290	14.5	+2.1
Green	Catherine Harmer	122	6.1	+2.3
Majority		944	47.3	−7.4
Turnout		1,996	18.6	−2.0
Labour hold		Swing	-3.7	

=== 2002 ===
2002
Party	Candidate	Votes	%	±%
Labour	Judith Blake	1,535	68.2	−2.3
Liberal Democrats	James Graham	304	13.5	−9.9
Conservative	Anthony Larvin	279	12.4	+12.4
Green	Francis Gray	86	3.8	−2.3
Socialist Alliance	James Jackson	47	2.1	+2.1
Majority		1,231	54.7	+7.6
Turnout		2,251	20.6	+2.7
Labour gain from Independent Socialist		Swing	+3.8	

=== 2000 ===
2000
Party	Candidate	Votes	%	±%
Labour	Geoff Driver	1,409	70.5	−5.1
Liberal Democrats	Christine Golton	468	23.4	+12.8
Green	Stephanie Hoare	121	6.1	+3.1
Majority		941	47.1	−17.4
Turnout		1,998	17.9	−0.7
Labour hold		Swing	-8.9	

=== 1999 ===
1999
Party	Candidate	Votes	%	±%
Labour	John Erskine	1,586	75.6	−2.6
Conservative	Anthony Larvin	233	11.1	+1.7
Liberal Democrats	Christine Glover	222	10.6	+2.1
Green	Charles Price	58	2.8	−1.1
Majority		1,353	64.5	−4.3
Turnout		2,099	18.6	+1.4
Labour hold		Swing	-2.1	

=== 1998 ===
1998
Party	Candidate	Votes	%	±%
Labour	Mark Davies	1,564	78.2	−7.2
Conservative	Anthony Larvin	188	9.4	+1.9
Liberal Democrats	Pauline Bardon	170	8.5	+1.4
Green	Susan Brierley	79	3.9	+3.9
Majority		1,376	68.8	−9.1
Turnout		2,001	17.2	
Labour hold		Swing	-4.5	

=== 1996 ===
1996
Party	Candidate	Votes	%	±%
Labour	Geoff Driver	2,295	85.4	−0.3
Conservative	Anthony Larvin	202	7.5	+2.1
Liberal Democrats	Simon Buckingham	191	7.1	+1.1
Majority		2,093	77.9	−1.8
Turnout		2,688	28.4	
Labour hold		Swing	-1.2	

=== 1995 ===
1995
Party	Candidate	Votes	%	±%
Labour	John Erskine	2,708	85.7	+4.0
Liberal Democrats	G. Melnick	191	6.0	−3.7
Conservative	J. Eastwood	170	5.4	−3.2
Green	G. Duncan	91	2.9	+2.9
Majority		2,517	79.7	+7.8
Turnout		3,160	28.6	
Labour hold		Swing	+3.8	

=== 1994 ===
1994
Party	Candidate	Votes	%	±%
Labour	M. Davies	2,916	81.7	+5.6
Liberal Democrats	G. Melnick	348	9.7	+3.4
Conservative	A. Larvin	306	8.6	−9.0
Majority		2,568	71.9	+13.3
Turnout		3,570	32.1	
Labour hold		Swing	+1.1	

=== 1992 ===
1992
Party	Candidate	Votes	%	±%
Labour	Geoff Driver	1,970	76.1	−8.3
Conservative	A. Larvin	454	17.5	+2.0
Liberal Democrats	Stephen Sadler	165	6.4	+6.4
Majority		1,516	58.6	−10.3
Turnout		2,589	22.6	
Labour hold		Swing	-5.1	

=== 1991 ===
1991
Party	Candidate	Votes	%	±%
Labour	Ian Hugill	3,256	84.4	−6.5
Conservative	A. Larvin	600	15.6	+6.5
Majority		2,656	68.9	−13.1
Turnout		3,856	33.2	
Labour hold		Swing	-6.5	

=== 1990 ===
1990
Party	Candidate	Votes	%	±%
Labour	John Gunnell	4,619	91.0	+13.1
Conservative	D. Thomas	458	9.0	−1.5
Majority		4,161	82.0	+14.7
Turnout		5,077	46.0	
Labour hold		Swing	+7.3	

=== 1988 ===
1988
Party	Candidate	Votes	%	±%
Labour	Geoff Driver	3,011	77.8	−1.8
Conservative	A. Larvin	407	10.5	+0.4
Independent	L. Parrish	308	8.0	+8.0
SLD	C. Lunn	142	3.7	−6.6
Majority		2,604	67.3	−2.1
Turnout		3,868	35.3	
Labour hold		Swing	-1.1	

=== 1987 ===
1987
Party	Candidate	Votes	%	±%
Labour	John Battle	3,469	79.7	+3.4
Alliance (Liberal)	R. Senior	446	10.2	−1.2
Conservative	A. Silver	440	10.1	−0.3
Majority		3,023	69.4	+4.6
Turnout		4,355	37.5	
Labour hold		Swing	+2.3	

=== 1986 ===
1986
Party	Candidate	Votes	%	±%
Labour	John Gunnell	2,423	76.3	−6.5
Alliance (Liberal)	D. Hollingsworth	365	11.5	+2.4
Conservative	H. Lavery	331	10.4	+2.3
National Front	H. Hilton	58	1.8	+1.8
Majority		2,058	64.8	−9.0
Turnout		3,177	27.5	
Labour hold		Swing	-4.4	

=== 1984 ===
1984
Party	Candidate	Votes	%	±%
Labour	Geoff Driver	3,379	82.8	−0.7
Alliance (Liberal)	S. Gillen	369	9.0	+2.2
Conservative	H. Lavery	333	8.2	−1.5
Majority		3,010	73.8	−0.1
Turnout		4,081	35.0	
Labour hold		Swing	-1.4	

=== 1983 ===
1983
Party	Candidate	Votes	%	±%
Labour	John Battle	3,520	83.5	+9.9
Conservative	R. Wilkinson	405	9.6	+0.4
Alliance (SDP)	D. Midgley	289	6.9	−10.3
Majority		3,115	73.9	+17.4
Turnout		4,214	35.5	
Labour hold		Swing	+4.7	

=== 1982 ===
1982
Party	Candidate	Votes	%	±%
Labour	Trevor Park	2,823	73.6	−10.8
Alliance (SDP)	G. Fox	657	17.1	+8.3
Conservative	J. Sibbald	354	9.2	+2.5
Majority		2,166	56.5	−19.1
Turnout		3,834	31	
Labour hold		Swing	-9.5	

=== 1980 ===
1980
Party	Candidate	Votes	%	±%
Labour	Geoff Driver	3,621	84.4	N/A
Labour	John Battle	3,472		
Labour	Trevor Park	3,417		
Liberal	L. Hirst	380	8.9	N/A
Liberal	E. Lynch	350		
Liberal	D. Marsh	289		
Conservative	D. Nichols	287	6.7	N/A
Conservative	R. Tetley	269		
Conservative	J. Stevens	266		
Majority		3,037	75.6	N/A
Turnout		4,288	34.4	N/A
Labour win (new seat)				
Labour win (new seat)				
Labour win (new seat)				

== Elections from 1973 to 1980 (Hunslet East & West) ==
=== 1979 ===
1979
Party	Candidate	Votes	%	±%
Labour	Trevor Park	6,166	56.1	+6.3
Liberal	P. Jones	2,902	26.4	+13.4
Conservative	C. Hudson	1,563	14.2	+3.2
National Front	N. Griffiths	243	2.2	−0.4
Communist	J. Hodgson	111	1.0	+1.0
Majority		3,264	29.7	+3.3
Turnout		10,985		
Labour gain from Liberal		Swing	-3.5	

=== 1978 ===
1978
Party	Candidate	Votes	%	±%
Labour	Geoff Driver	3,035	49.9	+6.9
Independent	Denis Pedder	1,425	23.4	+23.4
Liberal	J. Finnigan	795	13.1	−31.3
Conservative	R. Tetley	670	11.0	+2.4
National Front	N. Griffiths	462	2.7	−0.6
Majority		1,610	26.4	+24.9
Turnout		6,087		
Labour gain from Independent		Swing	-8.2	

=== 1976 ===
1976
Party	Candidate	Votes	%	±%
Liberal	Ivan Lester	2,904	44.4	−3.7
Labour	John Gunnell	2,807	42.9	+3.0
Conservative	R. Blackburn	565	8.6	−3.3
National Front	N. Griffiths	214	3.3	+3.3
British National	S. Brown	50	0.8	+0.8
Majority		97	1.5	−6.7
Turnout		6,540		
Liberal hold		Swing	-3.3	

=== 1975 ===
1975
Party	Candidate	Votes	%	±%
Liberal	M. Taylor	2,528	48.1	−7.6
Labour	Pat Fathers	2,096	39.9	+2.5
Conservative	R. Blackburn	627	11.9	+5.1
Majority		432	8.2	−10.2
Turnout		5,251		
Liberal hold		Swing	-5.0	

=== 1973 ===
1973
Party	Candidate	Votes	%	±%
Liberal	Denis Pedder	3,296	55.8	N/A
Liberal	J. Barrie	3,038		
Liberal	David Austick	2,869		
Labour	G. Bowsley	2,208	37.4	N/A
Labour	W. Pepper	2,160		
Labour	J. Hodkinson	2,154		
Conservative	N. Griffiths	405	6.9	N/A
Conservative	W. Laidler	355		
Conservative	I. Shuttleworth	321		
Majority		661	18.4	N/A
Turnout		5,909		N/A
Liberal win (new seat)				
Liberal win (new seat)				
Liberal win (new seat)				
