= Farnley and Wortley (ward) =

Electoral ward in Leeds, England

- Farnley and Wortley highlighted within Leeds
- Population: 18,214 (2023 electorate)
- Metropolitan borough: City of Leeds
- Metropolitan county: West Yorkshire
- Region: Yorkshire and the Humber
- Country: England
- Sovereign state: United Kingdom
- UK Parliament: Leeds South West and Morley
- Councillors: Wenzdae Robbins (Reform UK); Kate Haigh (Labour); Adrian McCluskey (Labour)

Farnley and Wortley is an electoral ward of Leeds City Council in west Leeds, West Yorkshire, covering the urban areas of Farnley and Wortley.

== Councillors since 1980 ==
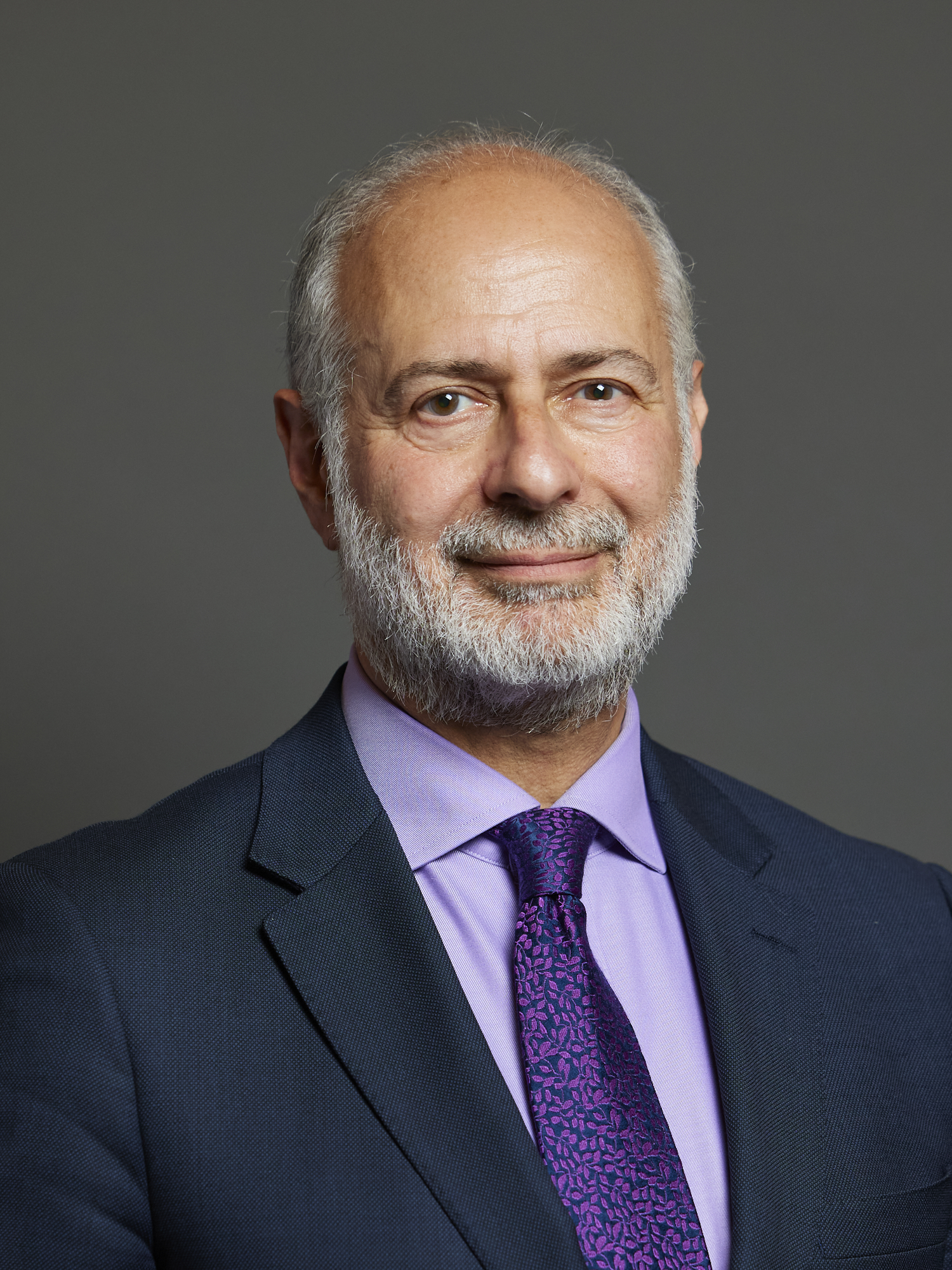
Fabian Hamilton represented Wortley (1987-1998). Member of Parliament for Leeds North East since 1997.

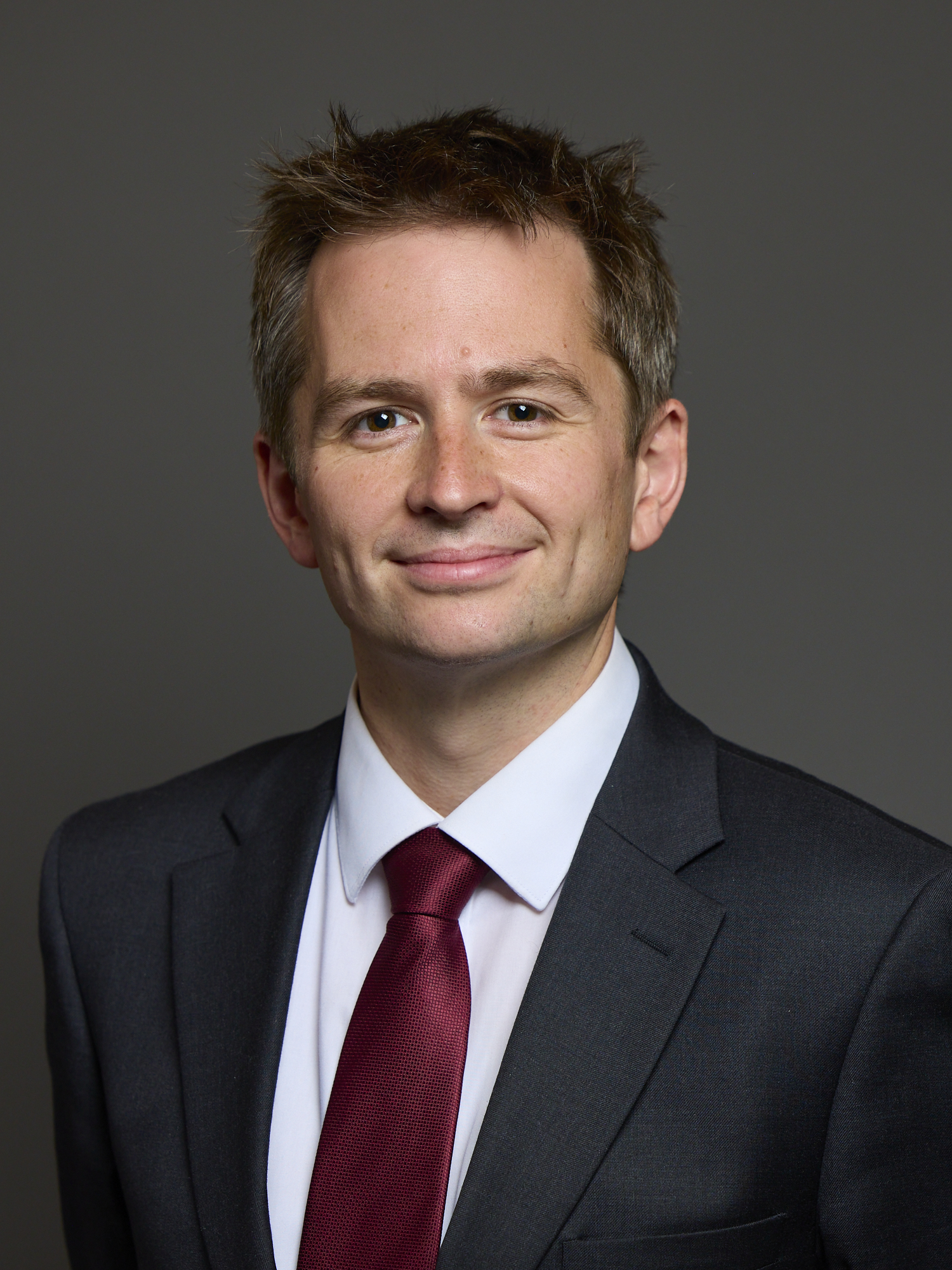
Mark Sewards represented Farnley and Wortley (2022-2024). Member of Parliament for Leeds South West and Morley since 2024.

| Election | Councillor | Councillor | Councillor |
Wortley (until 2004)
| 1980 | Walter Thurlow (Lab) | Pat Fathers (Lab) | Malcolm Bedford (Lab) |
| 1982 | Walter Thurlow (Lab) | Pat Fathers (Lab) | Malcolm Bedford (Lab) |
| 1983 | Walter Thurlow (Lab) | Pat Fathers (Lab) | Malcolm Bedford (Lab) |
| 1984 | Walter Thurlow (Lab) | Pat Fathers (Lab) | Malcolm Bedford (Lab) |
| 1986 | Walter Thurlow (Lab) | Pat Fathers (Lab) (Note: Prior to the 1986, Fathers was sacked from all of his council committee appointments and de-selected as the Labour candidate for the 1987 election after he was found to be leaking information in December 1985.) | Malcolm Bedford (Lab) |
| 1987 | Walter Thurlow (Lab) | Fabian Hamilton (Lab) | Malcolm Bedford (Lab) |
| 1988 | Philip Towler (Lab) | Fabian Hamilton (Lab) | Malcolm Bedford (Lab) |
| 1990 | Philip Towler (Lab) | Fabian Hamilton (Lab) | Malcolm Bedford (Lab) |
| 1991 | Philip Towler (Lab) | Fabian Hamilton (Lab) | Malcolm Bedford (Lab) |
| 1992 | Philip Towler (Lab) | Fabian Hamilton (Lab) | Malcolm Bedford (Lab) |
| 1994 | Philip Towler (Lab) | Fabian Hamilton (Lab) | Malcolm Bedford (Lab) |
| 1995 | Philip Towler (Lab) | Fabian Hamilton (Lab) | Malcolm Bedford (Lab) |
| 1996 | Philip Towler (Lab) | Fabian Hamilton (Lab) (Note: Hamilton resigned his council seat ahead of the 1998 council election following his election as Member of Parliament for Leeds North East in 1997.) | Malcolm Bedford (Lab) |
| 1998 | Philip Towler (Lab) | David Blackburn (GPEW) | Malcolm Bedford (Lab) |
| 1999 | Philip Towler (Lab) | David Blackburn (GPEW) | Malcolm Bedford (Lab) |
| 2000 | Claire Nash (GPEW) | David Blackburn (GPEW) | Malcolm Bedford (Lab) |
| 2002 | Claire Nash (GPEW) | David Blackburn (GPEW) | Ann Blackburn (GPEW) |
| 2003 | Claire Nash (GPEW) | David Blackburn (GPEW) | Ann Blackburn (GPEW) |
Farnley and Wortley (2004 to present)
| 2004 | Claire Nash (GPEW) | David Blackburn (GPEW) | Ann Blackburn (GPEW) |
| 2006 | Luke Russell (GPEW) | David Blackburn (GPEW) | Ann Blackburn (GPEW) |
| 2007 | Luke Russell (GPEW) | David Blackburn (GPEW) | Ann Blackburn (GPEW) |
| 2008 | Luke Russell (GPEW) | David Blackburn (GPEW) | Ann Blackburn (GPEW) |
| 2008 by-election | Andy Parnham (GPEW) (Note: Parnham lost his seat in 2010. He was later elected as a Labour councillor for Armley in 2023.) | David Blackburn (GPEW) | Ann Blackburn (GPEW) |
| 2010 | John Hardy (Lab) | David Blackburn (GPEW) | Ann Blackburn (GPEW) |
| 2011 | John Hardy (Lab) | David Blackburn (GPEW) | Ann Blackburn (GPEW) |
| 2012 | John Hardy (Lab) | David Blackburn (GPEW) | Ann Blackburn (GPEW) |
| 2014 | Terry Wilford (GPEW) | David Blackburn (GPEW) | Ann Blackburn (GPEW) |
| 2015 | Terry Wilford (GPEW) | David Blackburn (GPEW) | Ann Blackburn (GPEW) |
| 2016 | Terry Wilford (GPEW) | David Blackburn (GPEW) | Ann Blackburn (GPEW) |
| 2018 | Matt Gibson (Lab) | David Blackburn (GPEW) | Ann Blackburn (GPEW) |
| 2019 | Ann Forsaith (GPEW) | David Blackburn (GPEW) | Ann Blackburn (GPEW) |
| 2021 | Ann Forsaith (GPEW) | David Blackburn (GPEW) | Ann Blackburn (GPEW) |
| 2022 | Ann Forsaith (GPEW) | David Blackburn (GPEW) | Mark Sewards (Lab) |
| 2023 | Adrian McCluskey (Lab) | David Blackburn (GPEW) | Mark Sewards (Lab) |
| 2024 | Adrian McCluskey (Lab) | Kate Haigh (Lab) | Mark Sewards (Lab) (Note: Mark Sewards resigned on 28 August 2024 following his election as Member of Parliament for Leeds South West and Morley at the 2024 general election on 4 July.) |
| 2024 by-election | Adrian McCluskey (Lab) | Kate Haigh (Lab) | David Blackburn (GPEW) |
| 2026 | Adrian McCluskey* (Lab) | Kate Haigh* (Lab) | Wenzdae Robbins* (RUK) |

indicates seat up for re-election. indicates seat up for election following resignation or death of sitting councillor. * indicates incumbent councillor.

== Elections since 2010 ==
=== May 2026 ===
2026
| Party | Candidate | Votes | % | ±% |
|---|---|---|---|---|
| Reform | Wenzdae Robbins | 2,397 | 37.2 | New |
| Green | Ann Blackburn | 1,635 | 25.4 | ▼10.0 |
| Labour Co-op | Charlotte Hill | 983 | 15.3 | ▼30.4 |
| Independent | Peter Edward Allison | 922 | 14.3 | New |
| Conservative | Shikha Chaturvedi | 304 | 4.7 | ▼7.9 |
| Liberal Democrats | Peter Richard Andrews | 178 | 2.8 | ▼1.9 |
| SDP | Richard David Riley | 19 | 0.3 | ▼1.3 |
| Majority | | 762 | 11.8 | ▲1.5 |
| Turnout | | 6,443 | 35.4 | ▲8.4 |
| Rejected ballots | | 5 | 0.1 | |
| Registered electors | | 18,165 | | |
| Reform gain from Labour | | Swing | ▲33.8 | |

=== October 2024 by-election ===
10 October 2024 replacing Mark Sewards (resigned)
| Party | Candidate | Votes | % | ±% |
|---|---|---|---|---|
| Green | David Blackburn (Note: Blackburn previously represented Wortley and then Farnley and Wortley from 1998 until he lost his seat in May 2024.) | 1,450 | 38.6 | +3.2 |
| Labour | Al Garthwaite (Note: Garthwaite previously represented Headingley and then Headingley and Hyde Park from 2016 until she lost her seat in May 2024. She served as the 129th Lord Mayor of Leeds.) | 965 | 25.7 | −20.0 |
| Reform | David Dresser | 912 | 24.3 | New |
| Conservative | Lalit Suryawanshi | 202 | 5.4 | −7.2 |
| Liberal Democrats | Peter Andrews | 118 | 3.1 | −1.6 |
| Independent | Peter Allison | 70 | 1.9 | New |
| SDP | Richard Riley | 26 | 0.7 | −0.9 |
| Majority | | 485 | 12.9 | +2.6 |
| Turnout | | 3,755 | 20.2 | −6.8 |
| Green gain from Labour | | Swing | 11.6 | |

=== May 2024 ===
2024
| Party | Candidate | Votes | % | ±% |
|---|---|---|---|---|
| Labour Co-op | Kate Haigh | 2,222 | 45.7 | −3.1 |
| Green | David Blackburn* | 1,717 | 35.4 | +2.4 |
| Conservative | Daisy George | 613 | 12.6 | +1.8 |
| Liberal Democrats | Peter Andrews | 229 | 4.7 | +3.4 |
| SDP | Finley Taylor | 76 | 1.6 | +1.3 |
| Majority | | 505 | 10.3 | −5.5 |
| Turnout | | 4,907 | 27.0 | −0.3 |
| Labour Co-op gain from Green | | Swing | -2.8 | |

=== May 2023 ===
2023
| Party | Candidate | Votes | % | ±% |
|---|---|---|---|---|
| Labour | Adrian McCluskey | 2,438 | 48.9 | +1.1 |
| Green | Mark Rollinson | 1,648 | 33.1 | −0.8 |
| Conservative | Natalia Armitage | 538 | 10.8 | −7.1 |
| Reform | Andrea Whitehead | 201 | 4.0 | N/A |
| Liberal Democrats | Christine Golton | 65 | 1.3 | N/A |
| Independent | Bev Lockwood | 61 | 1.2 | N/A |
| SDP | Jack Bellfield | 17 | 0.3 | N/A |
| Majority | | 790 | 15.8 | +1.9 |
| Turnout | | 4,985 | 27.3 | −2.2 |
| Labour gain from Green | | Swing | | |

=== May 2022 ===
2022
| Party | Candidate | Votes | % | ±% |
|---|---|---|---|---|
| Labour | Mark Sewards | 2,567 | 47.8 | +11.2 |
| Green | Ann Blackburn* | 1,819 | 33.9 | −5.1 |
| Conservative | Peter Allison | 959 | 17.9 | +0.8 |
| Majority | | 748 | 13.9 | +11.6 |
| Turnout | | 5,367 | 29.5 | −2.8 |
| Labour gain from Green | | Swing | | |

=== May 2021 ===
2021
| Party | Candidate | Votes | % | ±% |
|---|---|---|---|---|
| Green | David Blackburn* | 2,293 | 39.0 | −2.1 |
| Labour | Matt Gibson | 2,155 | 36.6 | −0.1 |
| Conservative | Cormac Trigg | 1,004 | 17.1 | +10.3 |
| Yorkshire | Ian Cowling | 315 | 5.4 | N/A |
| Liberal Democrats | Maria Frank | 77 | 1.3 | −0.7 |
| Majority | | 138 | 2.3 | −2.1 |
| Turnout | | 5,884 | 32.3 | +4.9 |
| Green hold | | Swing | | |

=== May 2019 ===
2019
| Party | Candidate | Votes | % | ±% |
|---|---|---|---|---|
| Green | Ann Forsaith | 2,010 | 41.1 | −2.7 |
| Labour | Matt Gibson* | 1,798 | 36.7 | −0.6 |
| UKIP | Patrick Woods | 659 | 13.5 | +13.5 |
| Conservative | Hayley Nancolas | 332 | 6.8 | −5.4 |
| Liberal Democrats | Maria Frank | 96 | 2.0 | −0.8 |
| Majority | | 212 | 4.4 | −1.1 |
| Turnout | | 4,917 | 27.4 | −2.8 |
| Green gain from Labour | | Swing | -1.1 | |

=== May 2018 ===
2018
| Party | Candidate | Votes | % | ±% |
|---|---|---|---|---|
| Green | Ann Blackburn* | 2,461 | 43.8 | −3.8 |
| Green | David Blackburn* | 2,424 | | |
| Labour | Matt Gibson | 2,151 | 38.3 | +8.5 |
| Labour | Andrea McKenna | 1,991 | | |
| Labour | Andy Parnham | 1,989 | | |
| Green | Stuart Haley | 1,984 | | |
| Conservative | Hayley Nancolas | 685 | 12.2 | −2.0 |
| Conservative | Dorothy Flynn | 643 | | |
| Conservative | John Hardcastle | 615 | | |
| For Britain | Sam Melia | 162 | 2.9 | N/A |
| Liberal Democrats | Rosemary Spencer | 160 | 2.8 | +1.6 |
| Majority | | 310 | 5.5 | −12.3 |
| Turnout | | 17,956 | 30.2 | −0.2 |
| Green hold | | Swing | | |
| Green hold | | Swing | | |
| Labour gain from Green | | Swing | | |

=== May 2016 ===
2016
| Party | Candidate | Votes | % | ±% |
|---|---|---|---|---|
| Green | David Blackburn* | 2,517 | 47.6 | +10.8 |
| Labour | John Hardy | 1,576 | 29.8 | −0.8 |
| UKIP | Tony Roberts | 751 | 14.2 | −4.8 |
| Conservative | Hayley Laura Nancolas | 380 | 7.2 | −3.8 |
| Liberal Democrats | Rob Jacques | 60 | 1.2 | −0.8 |
| Majority | | 941 | 17.8 | +11.7 |
| Turnout | | 5,284 | 30.4 | |
| Green hold | | Swing | | |

=== May 2015 ===
2015
| Party | Candidate | Votes | % | ±% |
|---|---|---|---|---|
| Green | Ann Blackburn* | 3,851 | 36.8 | −10.6 |
| Labour | John Hardy | 3,208 | 30.6 | −6.7 |
| UKIP | Gregory McDougall | 1,991 | 19.0 | +19.0 |
| Conservative | Mohammed Rahman | 1,156 | 11.0 | −1.2 |
| Liberal Democrats | Robert Jacques | 212 | 2.0 | −1.2 |
| TUSC | Maddy Steeds | 58 | 0.6 | +0.6 |
| Majority | | 643 | 6.1 | −4.1 |
| Turnout | | 10,476 | 58.7 | |
| Green hold | | Swing | -2.0 | |

=== May 2014 ===
2014
| Party | Candidate | Votes | % | ±% |
|---|---|---|---|---|
| Green | Terry Wilford | 1,900 | 34.3 | |
| UKIP | Alan Felber | 1,606 | 29.0 | |
| Labour | John Hardy* | 1,506 | 27.2 | |
| Conservative | Samuel Fisher | 416 | 7.5 | |
| Liberal Democrats | Robert Jacques | 76 | 1.4 | |
| TUSC | Michael Johnson | 30 | 0.5 | |
| Majority | | 294 | | |
| Turnout | | 5534 | 31.52 | |
| Green gain from Labour | | Swing | | |

=== May 2012 ===
2012
| Party | Candidate | Votes | % | ±% |
|---|---|---|---|---|
| Green | David Blackburn* | 2,516 | 48.9 | +1.5 |
| Labour | David Dresser | 1,608 | 31.2 | −6.0 |
| UKIP | Mark Thackray | 541 | 10.5 | +10.5 |
| Conservative | Ryan Stephenson | 295 | 5.7 | −6.4 |
| Liberal Democrats | Elizabeth Bee | 118 | 2.3 | −0.9 |
| Independent | William Croke | 69 | 1.3 | +1.3 |
| Majority | | 908 | 17.6 | +7.4 |
| Turnout | | 5,147 | | |
| Green hold | | Swing | +3.7 | |

=== May 2011 ===
2011
| Party | Candidate | Votes | % | ±% |
|---|---|---|---|---|
| Green | Ann Blackburn* | 2,995 | 47.4 | +23.1 |
| Labour | Stuart McKenna | 2,353 | 37.3 | +4.2 |
| Conservative | Caroline Oldfield | 769 | 12.2 | −5.1 |
| Liberal Democrats | Philip Moore | 199 | 3.2 | −11.9 |
| Majority | | 642 | 10.2 | +1.4 |
| Turnout | | 6,316 | 35 | |
| Green hold | | Swing | +9.4 | |

=== May 2010 ===
2010
| Party | Candidate | Votes | % | ±% |
|---|---|---|---|---|
| Labour | John Hardy | 3,488 | 33.1 | +11.0 |
| Green | Andy Parnham | 2,563 | 24.3 | −20.3 |
| Conservative | Michael Best | 1,817 | 17.2 | +2.3 |
| Liberal Democrats | Philip Moore | 1,590 | 15.1 | +11.0 |
| BNP | Helen Foster | 1,084 | 10.3 | −3.5 |
| Majority | | 925 | 8.8 | −13.7 |
| Turnout | | 10,542 | 58.7 | +26.2 |
| Labour gain from Green | | Swing | +15.6 | |
