= Little London and Woodhouse (ward) =

Electoral ward in Leeds, England

- Little London and Woodhouse highlighted within Leeds
- Population: 16,301 (2023 electorate)
- Metropolitan borough: City of Leeds
- Metropolitan county: West Yorkshire
- Region: Yorkshire and the Humber
- Country: England
- Sovereign state: United Kingdom
- UK Parliament: Leeds Central and Headingley
- Councillors: Javaid Akhtar (Labour); Eden Hills (Green); Abigail Marshall Katung (Independent (Note: Elected as Labour))

Little London and Woodhouse is an electoral ward of Leeds City Council in Leeds, West Yorkshire, covering the urban areas of Little London and Woodhouse to the north of the city centre. It was created in advance of the 2018 council election.

== Councillors ==
Election	Councillor	Councillor	Councillor
2018	Kayleigh Brooks (Lab)	Javaid Akhtar (Lab) (Note: Akhtar had previously been a Liberal Democrat councillor for Harehills ward from April 2000 and then Gipton and Harehills ward from 2004 until he lost his seat in 2007. He later left the Liberal Democrats to join Labour and was elected for Hyde Park and Woodhouse ward in 2010 and then represented Little London and Woodhouse ward from 2018.)	Gerry Harper (Lab) (Note: Harper had been a councillor for University ward between 1994 and 2004, when he ran unsuccessfully for Roundhay ward. He was later elected for Hyde Park and Woodhouse ward in a by-election in February 2010 and held the seat until his election for Little London and Woodhouse ward.)
2019	Kayleigh Brooks (Lab)	Javaid Akhtar (Lab)	Abigail Marshall Katung (Lab)
2021	Kayleigh Brooks (Lab)	Javaid Akhtar (Lab)	Abigail Marshall Katung (Lab)
2022	Kayleigh Brooks (Lab)	Javaid Akhtar (Lab)	Abigail Marshall Katung (Lab)
2023	Kayleigh Brooks (Lab)	Javaid Akhtar (Lab)	Abigail Marshall Katung (Lab)
2024	Kayleigh Brooks (Lab)	Javaid Akhtar (Lab)	Abigail Marshall Katung (Lab)
June 2025	Kayleigh Brooks (Lab)	Javaid Akhtar (Lab)	Abigail Marshall Katung (Ind) (Note: As of June 2025, Marshall Katung sits as an independent councillor.)
2026	Eden Hills* (GPEW)	Javaid Akhtar* (Lab)	Abigail Marshall Katung* (Ind)

indicates seat up for election. * indicates current incumbent councillor. indicates change of party allegiance.

== Elections since 2018 ==
=== May 2026 ===
2026
Party	Candidate	Votes	%	±%
Green	Eden Hills	2,617	60.2	+38.2
Labour	Kayleigh Brooks*	1,001	23.0	−36.8
Reform	Bradley Holmes	326	7.5	New
Liberal Democrats	George Sykes	255	5.9	−1.2
Conservative	Jonathan Burkitt	125	2.9	−5.2
TUSC	TJ Diniz Mota	26	0.6	−2.4
Majority		1616	37.1	N/A
Turnout		4365	28.7	+5.4
Green gain from Labour		Swing	+37.5	

=== May 2024 ===
2024
Party	Candidate	Votes	%	±%
Labour	Javaid Akhtar*	2,194	59.8	−6.5
Green	Leon Zadok	808	22.0	+6.8
Conservative	Pauline Barron	297	8.1	−1.0
Liberal Democrats	Ghaffar Karim	260	7.1	+1.4
TUSC	Anthony Bracuti	109	3.0	−0.3
Majority		1386	37.8	−13.3
Turnout		3715	23.3	+5.6
Labour hold		Swing	-6.7	

=== May 2023 ===
2023
Party	Candidate	Votes	%	±%
Labour Co-op	Abigail Marshall Katung*	1,908	66.3	−5.4
Green	Nick Lalvani	437	15.2	+0.9
Conservative	Muhammad Raja	261	9.1	+1.9
Liberal Democrats	Katherine Arbuckle	163	5.7	+1.7
TUSC	Anthony Bracuti	96	3.3	+1.1
Majority		1,471	51.1	−6.4
Turnout		2,880	17.7	+1.4
Labour hold		Swing	-3.2	

=== May 2022 ===
2022
Party	Candidate	Votes	%	±%
Labour	Kayleigh Brooks*	2,033	71.7	+6.5
Green	Talia Ellis	404	14.3	−3.7
Conservative	Owen Rutherford	204	7.2	−2.5
Liberal Democrats	François van Cauwenbergh	112	4.0	−0.8
TUSC	Michael Johnson	62	2.2	+2.0
Majority		1,629	57.5	+9.3
Turnout		2,834	16.3	−4.5
Labour hold		Swing	+5.1	

=== May 2021 ===
2021
Party	Candidate	Votes	%	±%
Labour	Javaid Akhtar*	2,641	65.2	−3.0
Green	Marcus Cain	689	17.0	+2.2
Conservative	Jordan Young	393	9.7	+4.2
Liberal Democrats	Iulian Biris	196	4.8	−0.7
TUSC	Michael Johnson	82	0.2	+0.1
Majority		1,952	48.2	+5.2
Turnout		4,048	20.8	+0.2
Labour hold		Swing	-2.6	

=== May 2019 ===
2019
Party	Candidate	Votes	%	±%
Labour	Abigail Marshall Katung	1,749	68.2	−1.6
Green	Gavin Andrews	391	15.2	−0.1
Liberal Democrats	James Thomas Mock	142	5.5	−2.2
Conservative	Amy Green	140	5.5	−1.7
UKIP	Chris Jackson	124	4.8	+4.8
Socialist	Michael Johnson	18	0.7	+0.7
Majority		1,358	43.0	−20.1
Turnout		2,573	20.6	+5.0
Labour hold		Swing	-0.9	

=== May 2018 ===
2018
Party	Candidate	Votes	%	±%
Labour	Kayleigh Brooks	2,425	69.8	N/A
Labour	Javaid Akhtar*	2,415		
Labour	Gerry Harper*	2,126		
Green	Christopher Foren	530	15.3	N/A
Liberal Democrats	Lorna Campbell	268	7.7	N/A
Conservative	Brandon Ashford	249	7.2	N/A
Conservative	Stewart Harper	166		
Majority		1,895	63.1	N/A
Turnout		3,004	15.6	N/A
Labour win (new seat)				
Labour win (new seat)				
Labour win (new seat)				
