= Weetwood (ward) =

Electoral ward in Leeds, England

- Weetwood highlighted within Leeds
- Population: 15,776 (2023 electorate)
- Metropolitan borough: City of Leeds
- Metropolitan county: West Yorkshire
- Region: Yorkshire and the Humber
- Country: England
- Sovereign state: United Kingdom
- UK Parliament: Leeds Central and Headingley
- Councillors: Emma Flint (Labour); Jools Heselwood (Labour); Izaak Wilson (Labour)

Weetwood is an electoral ward of Leeds City Council in north-west Leeds, West Yorkshire. It encompasses suburban areas including Far Headingley, Ireland Wood, Tinshill, Weetwood, and West Park.

== Councillors since 1980 ==
Election	Councillor	Councillor	Councillor
1980	David Hall (Con) (Note: Hall was previously a councillor for Far Headingley ward from 1967, Weetwood from 1968 and then Cookridge and Weetwood ward from 1973.)	Sheila Gill (Con)	John Hamilton (Con) (Note: Hamilton was previously a Kirkstall ward councillor from 1975 until he lost his seat in 1979.)
1982	David Hall (Con)	Sheila Gill (Con)	John Hamilton (Con)
1983	David Hall (Con)	Sheila Gill (Con)	John Hamilton (Con)
1984	A.J.A. Lodge (Con)	Sheila Gill (Con)	John Hamilton (Con)
1986	A.J.A. Lodge (Con)	Sheila Gill (Con)	John Hamilton (Con)
1987	A.J.A. Lodge (Con)	Sheila Gill (Con)	John Hamilton (Con)
1988	Ann Castle (Con)	Sheila Gill (Con)	John Hamilton (Con)
1990	Ann Castle (Con)	Sheila Gill (Con)	Eileen Moxon (Lab)
1991	Ann Castle (Con)	Sheila Gill (Con)	Eileen Moxon (Lab)
1992	Ann Castle (Con)	Sheila Gill (Con)	Eileen Moxon (Lab)
1994	Ann Castle (Con)	Sheila Gill (Con)	Eileen Moxon (Lab)
1995	Ann Castle (Con) (Note: Castle lost her seat in 1996 but rejoined the council in 2000 on her election for Roundhay ward.)	Graham Platt (Lab) (Note: Platt had previously been a Whinmoor ward councillor from 1980 and 1990.)	Eileen Moxon (Lab)
1996	Judith Blake (Lab)	Graham Platt (Lab)	Eileen Moxon (Lab) (Note: Moxon lost her re-election bid at the next election in 1998 and a second attempt in 1999. She was elected for Chapel Allerton ward in 2000.)
1998	Judith Blake (Lab)	Graham Platt (Lab)	Stewart Golton (LD)
1999	Judith Blake (Lab) (Note: Blake lost her seat at the next election in 2000. She later served as a Hunslet ward councillor from 2002 till her election for Middleton Park ward at the 2004 election.)	Brian Jennings (LD)	Stewart Golton (LD)
2000	James Souper (LD)	Brian Jennings (LD)	Stewart Golton (LD)
2002	James Souper (LD)	Brian Jennings (LD)	Stewart Golton (LD)
2003	James Souper (LD)	Brian Jennings (LD)	Stewart Golton (LD)
2004	Sue Bentley (LD)	Brian Jennings (LD)	Stewart Golton (LD) (Note: Golton did not run for re-election in Weetwood ward at the next election in 2006 and successfully ran for Rothwell ward instead.)
2006	Sue Bentley (LD)	Brian Jennings (LD)	Judith Chapman (LD)
TBC	Sue Bentley (LD)	Brian Jennings (Ind) (Note: Jennings left the Liberal Democrat group to sit as an independent before the 2007 election.)	Judith Chapman (LD)
2007	Sue Bentley (LD)	Brian Jennings (Ind)	Judith Chapman (LD)
May 2007	Sue Bentley (LD)	Brian Jennings (Con) (Note: Following the recent election, Jennings joined the Conservatives as he felt "I can serve my ward better as part of a group rather than sitting as an independent." Now a Conservative, he lost his seat to the Liberal Democrats at the next election in 2008. Jennings would later rejoin the Liberal Democrats and stand for them again in Weetwood ward in 2018.)	Judith Chapman (LD)
2008	Sue Bentley (LD)	Ben Chastney (LD)	Judith Chapman (LD)
2010	Sue Bentley (LD)	Ben Chastney (LD)	Judith Chapman (LD)
2011	Sue Bentley (LD)	Ben Chastney (LD)	Judith Chapman (LD)
2012	Sue Bentley (LD)	Jonathan Bentley (LD)	Judith Chapman (LD)
2014	Sue Bentley (LD)	Jonathan Bentley (LD)	Judith Chapman (LD)
2015	Sue Bentley (LD)	Jonathan Bentley (LD)	Judith Chapman (LD)
2016	Sue Bentley (LD)	Jonathan Bentley (LD)	Judith Chapman (LD)
2018	Christine Knight (Lab)	Jonathan Bentley (LD)	James Gibson (Lab) (Note: Gibson lost his seat at the next election in 2019. He was elected to council again to represent Cross Gates and Whinmoor ward in 2021.)
2019	Christine Knight (Lab)	Jonathan Bentley (LD)	Chris Howley (LD)
2021	Emma Flint (Lab)	Jonathan Bentley (LD)	Chris Howley (LD)
2022	Emma Flint (Lab)	Izaak Wilson (Lab)	Chris Howley (LD)
2023	Emma Flint (Lab)	Izaak Wilson (Lab)	Jools Heselwood (Lab) (Note: Heselwood had previously represented Bramley and Stanningley ward from 2016 to 2023.)
2024	Emma Flint (Lab)	Izaak Wilson (Lab)	Jools Heselwood (Lab)
2026	Emma Flint* (Lab)	Izaak Wilson* (Lab)	Jools Heselwood* (Lab)

indicates seat up for re-election. indicates councillor defection. * indicates incumbent councillor.

== Elections since 2010 ==
=== May 2026 ===
2026
Party	Candidate	Votes	%	±%
Labour Co-op	Izaak Wilson*	2,684	33.9	▼15.7
Liberal Democrats	Chris Howley	2,213	27.9	▼4.7
Green	Simon Christopher Dixon	1,901	24.0	▲12.7
Reform	Peter Young	821	10.4	New
Conservative	Brijesh Virola	270	3.4	▼2.1
SDP	Rob Walker	30	0.4	▼0.6
Turnout			50.4	
Rejected ballots		20		
Registered electors		15,771		
Labour hold		Swing		

=== May 2024 ===
2024
Party	Candidate	Votes	%	±%
Labour Co-op	Emma Flint*	3,337	49.6	+3.0
Liberal Democrats	Chris Howley	2,195	32.6	−5.5
Green	Chris Foren	758	11.3	+3.0
Conservative	Luca Perricone	371	5.5	−0.7
SDP	Rob Walker	67	1.0	+0.3
Majority		1,142	17.0	+8.5
Turnout		6,762	43.3	+1.1
Labour hold		Swing	+4.3	

=== May 2023 ===
2023
Party	Candidate	Votes	%	±%
Labour Co-op	Jools Heselwood	3,103	46.6	−2.3
Liberal Democrats	Chris Howley*	2,534	38.1	+5.0
Green	Christopher Foren	550	8.3	−0.2
Conservative	Angelo Basu	411	6.2	−2.2
SDP	Rob Walker	47	0.7	−0.1
Majority		569	8.5	−7.4
Turnout		6,657	42.2	−0.4
Labour gain from Liberal Democrats		Swing		

=== May 2022 ===
2022
Party	Candidate	Votes	%	±%
Labour	Izaak Wilson	3,331	48.9	+1.7
Liberal Democrats	Sharon Slinger	2,251	33.1	+3.7
Green	Christopher Foren	577	8.5	−1.6
Conservative	Angelo Basu	575	8.4	−4.2
SDP	Rob Walker	54	0.8	N/A
Majority		1,080	15.9	−1.9
Turnout		6,807	42.6	−3.3
Labour gain from Liberal Democrats		Swing		

=== May 2021 ===
2021
Party	Candidate	Votes	%	±%
Labour Co-op	Emma Flint	3,540	47.2	+11.0
Liberal Democrats	Sharon Slinger	2,207	29.4	−12.0
Conservative	Angelo Basu	943	12.6	+6.6
Green	Christopher Foren	758	10.1	+1.7
Majority		1,333	17.8	+14.6
Turnout		7,496	45.9	+4.4
Labour hold		Swing		

=== May 2019 ===
2019
Party	Candidate	Votes	%	±%
Liberal Democrats	Chris Howley	2,574	41.4	+1.2
Labour	James Gibson*	2,379	38.2	+1.0
Green	Martin Hemingway	521	8.4	−4.7
UKIP	John Parsons	377	6.1	+6.1
Conservative	Angelo Basu	373	6.0	−3.5
Majority		195	+3.2	−0.1
Turnout		6,208	41.5	+0.7
Liberal Democrats gain from Labour		Swing	+0.1	

=== May 2018 ===
2018
Party	Candidate	Votes	%	±%
Liberal Democrats	Jonathan Bentley*	2,934	40.2	−4.1
Labour	Christine Knight	2,717	37.2	+4.7
Labour	James Gibson	2,699		
Liberal Democrats	Brian Jennings	2,488		
Labour	John McMahon	2,418		
Liberal Democrats	Lynda Sebire	2,241		
Green	Martin Hemingway	955	13.1	+6.3
Conservative	Angelo Basu	695	9.5	−0.3
Conservative	David Jessop	694		
Conservative	Howard Kiernan	674		
Majority		217	3.3	−8.5
Turnout		6,493	40.8	−0.5
Liberal Democrats hold		Swing		
Labour gain from Liberal Democrats		Swing		
Labour gain from Liberal Democrats		Swing		

=== May 2016 ===
2016
Party	Candidate	Votes	%	±%
Liberal Democrats	Jonathan Bentley*	2,701	44.3	+9.0
Labour	Roger Harington	1,982	32.5	+5.5
Conservative	Angelo Basu	597	9.8	−6.9
Green	Martin Francis Hemingway	415	6.8	−6.2
UKIP	Mike Cullen	398	6.5	−1.0
Majority		719	11.8	+3.5
Turnout		6,093	41.3	
Liberal Democrats hold		Swing		

=== May 2015 ===
2015
Party	Candidate	Votes	%	±%
Liberal Democrats	Sue Bentley*	3,790	35.3	−3.8
Labour	Alison Garthwaite	2,901	27.0	−4.1
Conservative	Dorothy Flynn	1,802	16.7	−2.6
Green	Martin Hemingway	1,400	13.0	+4.0
UKIP	Mike Cullen	812	7.5	+7.5
TUSC	Max Cussons	56	0.5	+0.5
Majority		889	8.3	+0.3
Turnout		10,761	68.2	
Liberal Democrats hold		Swing	+0.2	

=== May 2014 ===
2014
Party	Candidate	Votes	%	±%
Liberal Democrats	Judith Chapman*	2,155		
Labour	Julie Heselwood	1,768		
Conservative	Thomas McMeeking	806		
UKIP	Mike Cullen	737		
Green	Martin Hemingway	646		
TUSC	Max Cussons	40		
Majority		387		
Turnout			39.57	
Liberal Democrats hold		Swing		

=== May 2012 ===
2012
Party	Candidate	Votes	%	±%
Liberal Democrats	Jonathan Bentley	2,119	38.6	−0.6
Labour	Doreen Illingworth	1,762	32.1	+0.9
Conservative	Billy Flynn	818	14.9	−4.4
Green	Martin Hemingway	468	8.5	−0.4
English Democrat	Alan Procter	236	4.3	+4.3
Alliance for Green Socialism	Declan Normaschild	88	1.6	+1.6
Majority		357	6.5	−1.5
Turnout		5,491		
Liberal Democrats hold		Swing	-0.7	

=== May 2011 ===
2011
Party	Candidate	Votes	%	±%
Liberal Democrats	Sue Bentley*	2,605	39.1	−4.1
Labour	Caroline Gruen	2,072	31.1	+7.9
Conservative	Natalie Oliver	1,282	19.3	−4.8
Green	Martin Hemingway	596	9.0	+3.8
Independent	Alan Procter	99	1.5	+0.5
Majority		533	8.0	−11.2
Turnout		6,654	39	
Liberal Democrats hold		Swing	-6.0	

=== May 2010 ===
2010
Party	Candidate	Votes	%	±%
Liberal Democrats	Judith Chapman*	4,716	43.2	+2.0
Conservative	Matt Baker	2,622	24.0	−5.0
Labour	Carol Hughes	2,537	23.3	+7.1
Green	Martin Hemingway	559	5.1	−0.1
BNP	Peter Askins	287	2.6	−2.5
Independent	Alan Procter	106	1.0	−0.1
Alliance for Green Socialism	Keith Nathan	78	0.7	−1.1
Majority		2,094	19.2	+7.0
Turnout		10,905	64.5	+29.6
Liberal Democrats hold		Swing	+3.5	

== See also ==
- Listed buildings in Leeds (Weetwood Ward)
