= Headingley and Hyde Park (ward) =

Electoral ward in Leeds, England

- Headingley and Hyde Park highlighted within Leeds
- Population: 23,783 (2023 electorate)
- Metropolitan borough: City of Leeds
- Metropolitan county: West Yorkshire
- Region: Yorkshire and the Humber
- Country: England
- Sovereign state: United Kingdom
- UK Parliament: Leeds Central and Headingley
- Councillors: Tim Goodall (Green); Abdul Hannan (Labour); Nilesh Chohan (Green)

Headingley and Hyde Park is an electoral ward of Leeds City Council in Leeds, West Yorkshire, covering the inner-city area of Hyde Park (traditionally known as Wrangthorn, the name still used by the Church of England) and suburb of Headingley to the north of the city centre. It was created in advance of the 2018 council election.

== Councillors ==
Election	Councillor	Councillor	Councillor
2018	Jonathan Pryor (Lab) (Note: Pryor had been a Headingley ward councillor since 2014.)	Al Garthwaite (Lab) (Note: Garthwaite had been a Headingley ward councillor since 2016.)	Neil Walshaw (Lab) (Note: Walshaw had been a Headingley ward councillor since 2011.)
2019	Jonathan Pryor (Lab)	Al Garthwaite (Lab)	Neil Walshaw (Lab)
2021	Jonathan Pryor (Lab)	Al Garthwaite (Lab)	Neil Walshaw (Lab)
2022	Jonathan Pryor (Lab)	Al Garthwaite (Lab)	Neil Walshaw (Lab)
January 2023	Jonathan Pryor (Lab)	Al Garthwaite (Lab)	Vacant (Note: Neil Walshaw resigned from his council seat on 13 January 2023. Walshaw had previously announced his intention to not stand for re-election in 2023 on 10 October 2022.)
2023	Jonathan Pryor (Lab)	Al Garthwaite (Lab)	Abdul Hannan (Lab)
2024	Jonathan Pryor (Lab)	Tim Goodall (GPEW)	Abdul Hannan (Lab)
2026	Nilesh Chohan* (GPEW)	Tim Goodall* (GPEW)	Abdul Hannan* (Lab)

indicates seat up for election. indicates councillor vacancy. * indicates current incumbent councillor.

== Elections since 2018 ==
=== May 2026 ===
2026
Party	Candidate	Votes	%	±%
Green	Nilesh Chohan	4,334	70.6	+19.4
Labour Co-op	Jonathan Pryor*	1,278	20.8	−20.2
Reform	Andrew Wilde	225	3.7	New
Liberal Democrats	Brandon Ashford	139	2.3	−0.7
Conservative	Della Heptinstall	97	1.6	−0.7
Your Party	Ryan Richards	62	1.0	New
Majority		3,056	49.8	N/A
Turnout		6151	28.0	+3.8
Green gain from Labour Co-op		Swing	+19.8	

=== May 2024 ===
2024
Party	Candidate	Votes	%	±%
Green	Tim Goodall	2,668	51.2	+9.4
Labour	Al Garthwaite*	2,138	41.0	−7.4
Liberal Democrats	Amar Ali Karim	158	3.0	−0.4
Conservative	Steven Rowley	120	2.3	−0.5
TUSC	Florian Hynam	71	1.4	+0.2
Independent	Anthony Greaux	27	1.1	+0.4
Majority		530	10.2	+9.4
Turnout		5,210	24.2	+24.5
Green gain from Labour		Swing	+5.7	

=== May 2023 ===
2023
Party	Candidate	Votes	%	±%
Labour	Abdul Hannan	2,029	48.5	−5.6
Green	Tim Goodall	1,749	41.8	+6.8
Liberal Democrats	Brandon Ashford	145	3.5	−0.9
Conservative	Andrew Martin	119	2.8	−0.7
NIP	Molly Tindle	52	1.2	N/A
TUSC	Florian Hynam	48	1.1	+0.9
Independent	Anthony Greaux	27	0.6	−0.2
Majority		280	6.7	−12.3
Turnout		4,185	17.6	+0.9
Labour hold		Swing		

=== May 2022 ===
2022
Party	Candidate	Votes	%	±%
Labour	Jonathan Pryor*	2,210	54.1	−2.1
Green	Tim Goodall	1,432	35.0	+5.3
Liberal Democrats	Brandon Ashford	179	4.4	+0.2
Conservative	Steven Rowley	145	3.5	−1.5
TUSC	Anthony Bracuti	70	1.7	+0.5
Independent	Anthony Greaux	36	0.8	+0.3
Majority		778	19.0	−7.6
Turnout		4,086	16.7	−5.6
Labour hold		Swing		

=== May 2021 ===
2021
Party	Candidate	Votes	%	±%
Labour	Al Garthwaite*	3,087	56.2	+2.4
Green	Tim Goodall	1,628	29.7	+1.8
Conservative	Isaac Woolmer	274	5.0	+1.2
Liberal Democrats	Brandon Ashford	232	4.2	−6.9
Yorkshire	Tyler Wilson	99	1.8	±0.0
TUSC	Florian Hynam	65	1.2	N/A
Independent	Anthony Greaux	30	0.5	N/A
SDP	Michael Bellfield	10	0.2	N/A
Majority		1,459	26.6	+0.7
Turnout		5,490	22.3	−0.8
Labour hold		Swing		

=== May 2019 ===
2019
Party	Candidate	Votes	%	±%
Labour	Neil Walshaw*	2,055	53.8	+2.7
Green	Tim Goodall	1,066	27.9	+7.1
Liberal Democrats	Penny Goodman	425	11.1	+3.1
Conservative	Steven Rowley	146	3.8	+0.4
Yorkshire	Anthony Greaux	67	1.8	N/A
Women's Equality	Caroline Ann Hunt	60	1.6	−4.8
Majority		989	25.9	−4.4
Turnout		3,839	23.1	+0.1
Labour hold		Swing	-2.2	

=== May 2018 ===
2018
Party	Candidate	Votes	%	±%
Labour	Jonathan Pryor*	3,126	51.1	N/A
Labour	Al Garthwaite*	2,999		
Labour	Neil Walshaw*	2,694		
Green	Tim Goodall	1,270	20.8	N/A
Green	Liberty Anstead	643		
Green	Ann Forsaith	576		
Liberal Democrats	Penny Goodman	488	8.0	N/A
Women's Equality	Louise Jennings	394	6.4	N/A
Liberal Democrats	Peter Andrews	351	5.7	
Liberal Democrats	Murray Hawthorne	276		
Conservative	Michael Gledhill	205	3.4	N/A
Conservative	Justin Earley	201		
Conservative	Kyle Green	191		
TUSC	James Ellis	78	1.3	N/A
Majority		1,856	30.3	N/A
Turnout		20,145	23.0	N/A
Labour win (new seat)				
Labour win (new seat)				
Labour win (new seat)				
