= 2022 Leeds City Council election =

- 5 May 2022

35 of 99 seats on Leeds City Council 50 seats needed for a majority
- Turnout: 33.7% (▼3.97%)
	First party	Second party	Third party
Leader	James Lewis	Andrew Carter
Party	Labour	Conservative	Liberal Democrats
Last election	19 seats, 42.4%	9 seats, 31.8%	2 seats, 8.7%
Seats before	52	23	8
Seats won	22	6	2
Seats after	58	21	7
Seat change	▲3	▼3	▼1
Popular vote	92,818	56,864	19,705
Percentage	44.1%	27.0%	9.4%
Swing	▲1.7pp	▼4.8pp	▲0.7pp
	Fourth party	Fifth party	Sixth party
Party	Morley Borough Independents	Green	Garforth and Swillington Independents
Last election	2 seats, 2.3%	1 seats, 11.4%	1 seat, 2.1%
Seats before	6	3	3
Seats won	2	1	1
Seats after	6	3	3
Seat change	Steady	Steady	Steady
Popular vote	5,422	24,063	4,488
Percentage	2.6%	11.4%	2.1%
Swing	▲0.3pp	▲2.2pp	▲0.7pp
	Seventh party
Party	SDP
Last election	0 seats, 1.3%
Seats before	0
Seats won	1
Seats after	1
Seat change	▲1
Popular vote	3,179
Percentage	1.5%
Swing	▲0.2pp
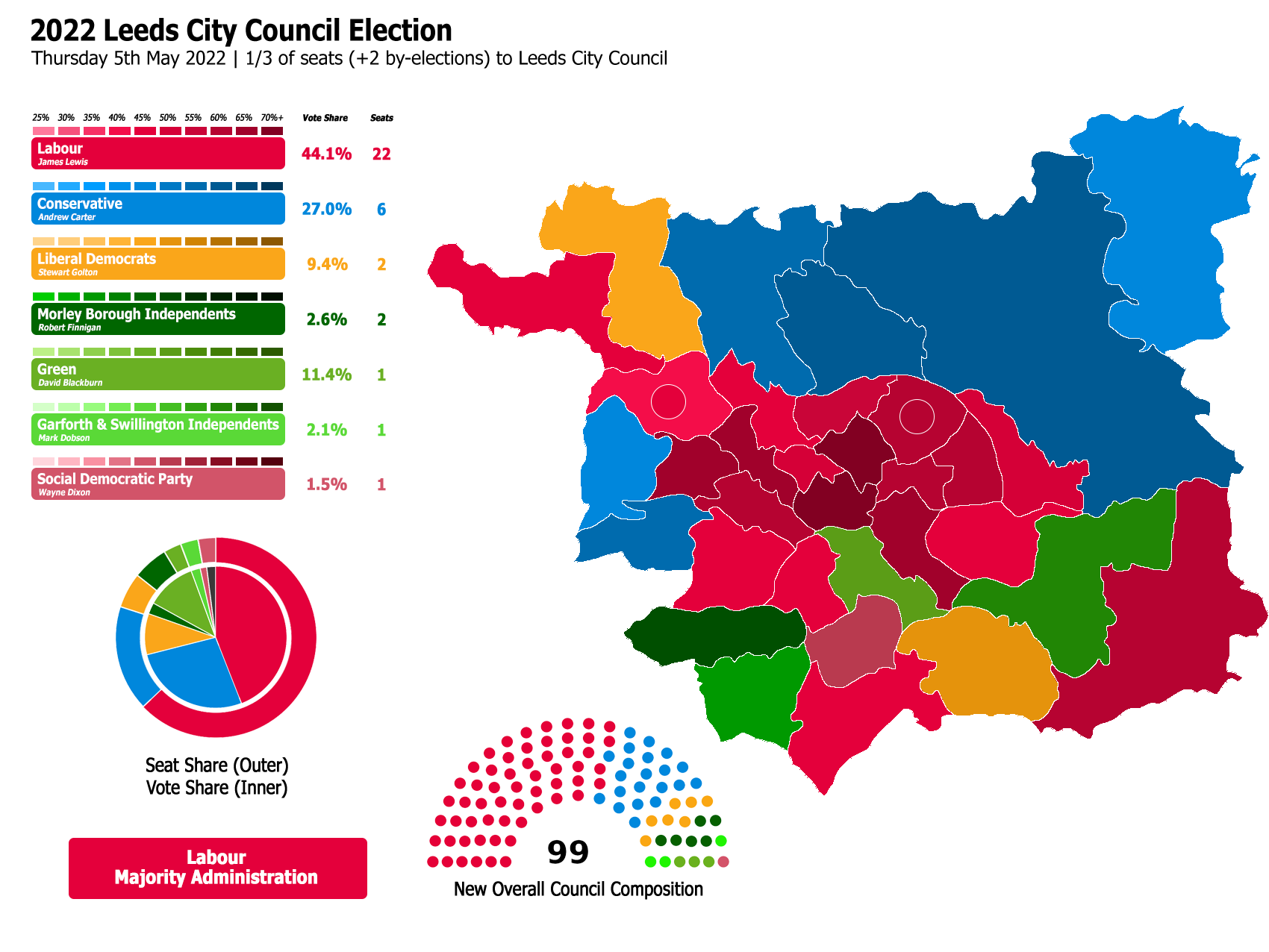
- Map of the results of the election by ward
Council Control before election
Majority administration
Labour
Subsequent council control
Majority administration
Labour

The 2022 Leeds City Council election took place on Thursday 5 May 2022 to elect members of Leeds City Council in England. It was held on the same day as other local elections across the United Kingdom.

As per the election cycle, one third of the council's 99 seats were contested alongside two casual vacancies in the Horsforth and Roundhay wards.

The Labour Party maintained their majority control of the council, with a net gain of three seats. The Social Democratic Party formed in 1990 secured its only council seat in the United Kingdom.

== Election summary ==
Leeds City Council Election Result 2022
Party	Candidates						Votes		
Party	Stood	Elected	Gained	Unseated	Net	% of total	%	No.	Net %
Labour	35	22	5	2	▲3	60.0	44.1	92,818	+1.7
Conservative	35	6	0	3	▼3	17.1	27.0	56,864	-4.8
Green	34	1	1	1	Steady	2.9	11.4	24,063	+2.2
Liberal Democrats	33	2	0	1	▼1	5.7	9.4	19,705	+0.7
Morley Borough Independent	2	2	0	0	Steady	5.7	2.6	5,422	+0.3
Garforth and Swillington Independents	1	1	0	0	Steady	2.9	2.1	4,488	+0.7
SDP	7	1	1	0	▲1	2.9	1.5	3,179	+0.2
Yorkshire	7	0	0	0	Steady	0.0	1.0	2,095	-0.2
Alliance for Green Socialism	2	0	0	0	Steady	0.0	0.3	564	±0.0
TUSC	5	0	0	0	Steady	0.0	0.2	395	±0.0
Independent	2	0	0	0	Steady	0.0	0.2	376	-0.2
Freedom Alliance	2	0	0	0	Steady	0.0	0.1	164	±0.0
NIP	1	0	0	0	Steady	0.0	0.1	147	New
Women's Equality	1	0	0	0	Steady	0.0	0.1	120	±0.0
Total	167	35	5	5	Steady	100.0	100.0	210,400	▼12,247

The election result had the following consequences for the political composition of the council:

Party	2021 election	Prior to election	New council
Labour	54	52	58
Conservative	24	23	21
Liberal Democrat	8	8	7
Morley Borough Independents	6	6	6
Garforth and Swillington Independents	3	3	3
Green	3	3	3
SDP	0	0	1
Independent	1 (Note: Former Labour councillor, Ronald Grahame (Burmantofts and Richmond Hill), was charged with historic child sex offences in December 2020 and was "suspended from the Labour party pending the outcome of the case.")	2 (Note: Labour councillor Paul Drinkwater (Killingbeck and Seacroft) resigned from the party on 10 May 2021. The Yorkshire Evening Post reported he cited "institutionalised bullying" in the ruling Labour council group and argued for a change to the council's decision-making structures. He did not seek re-election in 2022.)	0
Vacant	0	2 (Note: Conservative councillor, Jonathon Taylor (Horsforth), resigned from office on 15 March 2022 to take up a politically restricted job and Labour councillor, Jacob Goddard (Roundhay), also resigned on 23 March 2022. Two replacement councillors were elected on 5 May 2022.)	0
Total	99	99	99
Working majority	9	7	17

== Councillors who did not stand for re-election ==
Councillor/s who did not stand for re-election (10)
Councillor	Ward	First elected	Party	Reason	Successor
Jonathan Bentley	Weetwood	2012	Liberal Democrats	stood down	Izaak Wilson (Labour)
Rebecca Charlwood	Moortown	2011	Labour	stood down	Mahalia France-Mir (Labour)
Paul Drinkwater	Killingbeck and Seacroft	2018 (as Labour)	Independent	stood down	John Tudor (Labour)
Judith Elliott	Morley South	2004	Morley Borough Independents	stood down	Oliver Newton (Morley Borough Independents)
Angela Gabriel	Beeston and Holbeck	1996	Labour	deselected	Annie Maloney (Labour)
Jacob Goddard	Roundhay	2018	Labour	resigned office	Jordan Bowden (Labour)
Ronald Grahame	Burmantofts and Richmond Hill	1982, 2010 (as Labour)	Independent	stood down	Luke Farley (Labour)
Kim Groves	Middleton Park	2010	Labour	stood down	Wayne Dixon (SDP)
Graham Latty	Guiseley & Rawdon	2000	Conservative	stood down	Eleanor Thomson (Labour)
Jonathon Taylor	Horsforth	2018	Conservative	resigned office	John Garvani (Labour)

== Results by ward ==
=== Adel & Wharfedale ===
Adel & Wharfedale
Party	Candidate	Votes	%	±%
Conservative	Barry Anderson*	4,385	56.3	+0.7
Labour	Chris Bridges	2,104	27.0	+2.7
Liberal Democrats	Mark Twitchett	663	8.5	−4.0
Green	Fiona Love	486	6.2	−0.7
Yorkshire	Corey Robinson	127	1.6	N/A
Majority		2,281	29.3	−2.0
Turnout		7,793	47.3	−2.7
Conservative hold		Swing		

=== Alwoodley ===
Alwoodley
Party	Candidate	Votes	%	±%
Conservative	Dan Cohen*	4,466	60.3	+2.8
Labour	Lucy Nuttgens	2,099	28.3	−2.1
Green	Alaric Hall	283	3.8	N/A
Liberal Democrats	Roderic Parker	278	3.8	−0.4
Yorkshire	Howard Dews	137	1.8	−1.3
Women's Equality	Louise Jennings	120	1.6	−0.6
Majority		2,367	32.0	+4.9
Turnout		7,408	42.2	−2.1
Conservative hold		Swing		

=== Ardsley & Robin Hood ===
Ardsley & Robin Hood
Party	Candidate	Votes	%	±%
Labour Co-op	Karen Renshaw*	2,572	45.3	+4.0
Conservative	Alan Shires	2,246	39.5	−7.5
Green	Marcus Cain	362	6.4	+0.6
Liberal Democrats	Benjamin Ward	360	6.3	+2.2
SDP	Andrew Martin	105	1.8	+0.7
Majority		326	5.7	0.0
Turnout		5,679	32.0	−4.0
Labour hold		Swing		

=== Armley ===
Armley
Party	Candidate	Votes	%	±%
Labour	Alice Smart*	2,653	62.0	+5.7
Conservative	Tamas Kovacs	666	15.6	−4.6
Green	Mark Rollinson	642	15.0	−1.1
Liberal Democrats	Dan Walker	205	4.8	+0.6
TUSC	Florian Hynam	85	2.0	+0.4
Majority		1,987	46.5	+10.4
Turnout		4,276	24.9	−4.4
Labour hold		Swing		

=== Beeston & Holbeck ===
Beeston & Holbeck
Party	Candidate	Votes	%	±%
Labour	Annie Maloney	2,070	47.2	−5.6
Green	Mariana Polucciu	971	22.2	+8.0
Conservative	Natalia Armitage	740	16.9	−2.0
SDP	Nigel Perry	250	5.7	N/A
Liberal Democrats	Peter Andrews	179	4.1	+1.9
NIP	Emily Reaney	147	3.4	N/A
Majority		1,099	25.1	−8.8
Turnout		4,382	24.0	−5.4
Labour hold		Swing		

=== Bramley & Stanningley ===
Bramley & Stanningley
Party	Candidate	Votes	%	±%
Labour	Kevin Ritchie*	3,230	68.2	+15.3
Conservative	Adam Cook	819	17.3	−8.2
Liberal Democrats	Elizabeth Bee	338	7.1	−3.8
Green	Keith Whittaker	290	6.1	−2.7
SDP	Daniel Whetstone	36	0.1	−0.7
Majority		2,411	50.9	+23.6
Turnout		4,734	27.6	−2.9
Labour hold		Swing		

=== Burmantofts & Richmond Hill ===
Burmantofts & Richmond Hill
Party	Candidate	Votes	%	±%
Labour	Luke Farley	2,674	66.6	+6.2
Conservative	Brian Berry	422	10.5	−2.0
Independent	Geoff Holloran	340	8.5	−2.7
Liberal Democrats	David Hollingsworth	295	7.3	−0.4
Green	Richard Wilson	263	6.6	−0.7
Majority		2,252	56.1	+8.2
Turnout		4,015	23.4	−5.6
Labour hold		Swing		

=== Calverley & Farsley ===
Calverley & Farsley
Party	Candidate	Votes	%	±%
Conservative	Andrew Carter*	3,539	46.7	−6.9
Labour Co-op	Craig Timmins	3,243	42.8	+8.8
Green	Ellen Graham	318	4.2	−3.8
Liberal Democrats	Ian Dowling	228	3.0	−0.7
Yorkshire	Robert Lees	225	3.0	N/A
SDP	Justin Thomas	14	0.0	N/A
Majority		296	3.9	−15.7
Turnout		7,584	41.3	−3.1
Conservative hold		Swing		

=== Chapel Allerton ===
Chapel Allerton
Party	Candidate	Votes	%	±%
Labour	Eileen Taylor*	4,650	73.8	+6.4
Green	Bobak Walker	691	11.0	−1.5
Conservative	Shazar Ahad	488	7.7	−1.8
Liberal Democrats	James Marshall	278	4.4	−1.4
Alliance for Green Socialism	Mike Davies	164	3.1	+0.0
Majority		3,959	62.8	+7.9
Turnout		6,303	34.0	−5.2
Labour hold		Swing		

=== Cross Gates & Whinmoor ===
Cross Gates & Whinmoor
Party	Candidate	Votes	%	±%
Labour	Pauleen Grahame*	2,915	51.2	+7.9
Conservative	John Kennedy	1,929	33.9	−7.3
Liberal Democrats	Benjamin Wood	421	7.4	+5.2
Green	Martin Hemingway	401	7.0	+1.2
Majority		986	17.3	+15.2
Turnout		5,688	30.8	−4.4
Labour hold		Swing		

=== Farnley & Wortley ===
Farnley & Wortley
Party	Candidate	Votes	%	±%
Labour	Mark Sewards	2,567	47.8	+11.2
Green	Ann Blackburn*	1,819	33.9	−5.1
Conservative	Peter Allison	959	17.9	+0.8
Majority		748	13.9	+11.6
Turnout		5,367	29.5	−2.8
Labour gain from Green		Swing		

=== Garforth & Swillington ===
Garforth & Swillington
Party	Candidate	Votes	%	±%
Garforth and Swillington Independents	Mark Dobson*	4,488	63.0	+14.2
Conservative	Peter Youngs	1,133	15.9	−11.3
Labour	David Nagle	1,107	15.5	−1.5
Green	Stephen Beer	258	3.6	−1.9
Liberal Democrats	Jake Knox	117	1.6	+0.6
Majority		3,355	47.1	+25.5
Turnout		7,127	43.9	−3.6
Garforth and Swillington Independents hold		Swing		

=== Gipton & Harehills ===
Gipton & Harehills
Party	Candidate	Votes	%	±%
Labour	Salma Arif*	2,722	60.5	−12.9
Green	Mothin Ali	1,001	22.3	+16.2
Conservative	Robert Harris	454	10.1	−1.6
Liberal Democrats	Aqila Choudhry	206	4.6	+0.5
TUSC	Tanis Belsham-Wray	82	1.8	−0.8
Majority		1,721	38.3	−23.3
Turnout		4,498	25.3	−4.6
Labour hold		Swing		

=== Guiseley & Rawdon ===
Guiseley & Rawdon
Party	Candidate	Votes	%	±%
Labour Co-op	Eleanor Thomson	3,957	47.8	+11.9
Conservative	Pete Gable	3,024	36.5	−9.1
Yorkshire	Bob Buxton	703	8.5	−0.9
Green	Richard Firth	290	3.5	−1.6
Liberal Democrats	Stuart McLeod	278	3.4	+0.3
Majority		933	11.3	+1.6
Turnout		8,281	44.5	−3.2
Labour gain from Conservative		Swing		

=== Harewood ===
Harewood
Party	Candidate	Votes	%	±%
Conservative	Matthew Robinson*	4,062	61.4	−5.9
Labour	Michael Millar	1,489	22.5	+4.6
Green	Claire Evans	596	9.0	+0.2
Liberal Democrats	Dan Cook	441	6.7	+1.6
Majority		2,573	38.9	−10.6
Turnout		6,616	44.2	−6.0
Conservative hold		Swing		

=== Headingley & Hyde Park ===
Headingley & Hyde Park
Party	Candidate	Votes	%	±%
Labour	Jonathan Pryor*	2,210	54.1	−2.1
Green	Tim Goodall	1,432	35.0	+5.3
Liberal Democrats	Brandon Ashford	179	4.4	+0.2
Conservative	Steven Rowley	145	3.5	−1.5
TUSC	Anthony Bracuti	70	1.7	+0.5
Independent	Anthony Greaux	36	0.8	+0.3
Majority		778	19.0	−7.6
Turnout		4,086	16.7	−5.6
Labour hold		Swing		

=== Horsforth ===
Horsforth
Party	Candidate	Votes	%	±%
Labour	Emmie Bromley	3,402	44.7	+14.0
Labour	John Garvani	3,166	41.6	+10.9
Conservative	Dawn Collins*	2,673	35.2	−3.1
Conservative	Tracy Stones	2,492	32.8	−5.5
Liberal Democrats	Simon Dowling	1,292	17.0	−3.4
Liberal Democrats	Becky Heaviside	974	12.8	−7.6
Green	Gideon Jones	569	7.5	+0.4
Green	Ian Shaw	330	4.3	−2.8
Yorkshire	Ian Cowling	330	4.3	+1.8
Majority		729	9.6	+2.1
Turnout		7,603	42.3	−5.5
Labour gain from Conservative		Swing		
Labour gain from Conservative		Swing		

=== Hunslet & Riverside ===
Hunslet & Riverside
Party	Candidate	Votes	%	±%
Green	Ed Carlisle	2,441	50.9	+9.2
Labour	Elizabeth Nash*	1,947	40.6	−5.2
Conservative	Samson Adeyemi	253	5.3	−2.9
Liberal Democrats	Benedict Turner-Chastney	53	1.1	−0.5
Freedom Alliance	Nick Cottle	42	0.9	N/A
SDP	Thomas Foster	33	0.7	−0.1
Majority		494	10.3	+6.1
Turnout		4,793	27.2	−4.3
Green gain from Labour		Swing		

=== Killingbeck & Seacroft ===
Killingbeck & Seacroft
Party	Candidate	Votes	%	±%
Labour	John Tudor	2,510	61.7	−0.3
Conservative	Cormac Trigg	803	19.7	−4.4
Green	David Anthoney	293	7.2	−1.0
Liberal Democrats	John Otley	229	5.6	+1.9
Freedom Alliance	Suzanne Harbourne	122	3.0	N/A
TUSC	Iain Dalton	96	2.3	+2.2
Majority		1,707	41.9	+4.0
Turnout		4,071	22.6	−4.0
Labour hold		Swing		

=== Kippax & Methley ===
Kippax & Methley
Party	Candidate	Votes	%	±%
Labour	Mary Harland*	3,673	63.1	+10.9
Conservative	Connor Mulhall	1,545	26.6	−9.0
Green	Keith Hale	330	5.7	−2.7
Liberal Democrats	Christine Golton	243	4.1	+2.0
Majority		2,128	36.6	+20.0
Turnout		5,819	33.7	−5.7
Labour hold		Swing		

=== Kirkstall ===
Kirkstall
Party	Candidate	Votes	%	±%
Labour	Hannah Bithell*	3,346	67.1	0.0
Green	Victoria Smith	797	16.0	+1.5
Conservative	Reiss Capitano	511	10.2	−3.0
Liberal Democrats	Adam Belcher	287	5.8	+2.6
Majority		2,549	51.1	−1.5
Turnout		4,986	30.8	−4.3
Labour hold		Swing		

=== Little London & Woodhouse ===
Little London & Woodhouse
Party	Candidate	Votes	%	±%
Labour	Kayleigh Brooks*	2,033	71.7	+6.5
Green	Talia Ellis	404	14.3	−3.7
Conservative	Owen Rutherford	204	7.2	−2.5
Liberal Democrats	François Van Cauwenbergh	112	4.0	−0.8
TUSC	Michael Johnson	62	2.2	+2.0
Majority		1,629	57.5	+9.3
Turnout		2,834	16.3	−4.5
Labour hold		Swing		

=== Middleton Park ===
Middleton Park
Party	Candidate	Votes	%	±%
SDP	Wayne Dixon	2,687	50.5	+15.8
Labour	Peter Chambers	1,910	36.0	−4.9
Conservative	Taiwo Adeyemi	408	7.7	−8.5
Green	Kay-Lee Asquith	207	3.9	−1.5
Liberal Democrats	Jude Arbuckle	82	1.5	−0.6
Majority		777	14.6	−0.1
Turnout		5,317	26.3	−1.5
SDP gain from Labour		Swing		

=== Moortown ===
Moortown
Party	Candidate	Votes	%	±%
Labour	Mahalia France-Mir	3,980	55.6	+2.4
Conservative	Rob Speed	1,357	19.0	−4.5
Green	Rachel Hartshorne	1,086	15.2	+1.2
Liberal Democrats	George Sykes	690	9.6	+3.3
Majority		2,623	36.6	+5.9
Turnout		7,157	41.1	−5.0
Labour hold		Swing		

=== Morley North ===
Morley North
Party	Candidate	Votes	%	±%
Morley Borough Independents	Bob Gettings*	3,101	50.4	+8.4
Labour	Patrick Davey	1,373	22.3	+0.6
Conservative	Lidia Smith	1,052	17.1	−10.7
Green	Aisling Dolan	506	8.2	+2.6
Liberal Democrats	James Spencer	98	1.6	−0.3
Majority		1,728	28.0	+13.8
Turnout		6,153	33.7	−4.3
Morley Borough Independents hold		Swing		

=== Morley South ===
Morley South
Party	Candidate	Votes	%	±%
Morley Borough Independents	Oliver Newton	2,321	39.6	+6.5
Labour	Bailey Bradley	1,769	30.2	+4.9
Conservative	Lalit Suryawanshi	1,150	19.6	−7.7
Green	Chris Bell	470	8.0	−1.5
Liberal Democrats	Penny Goodman	137	2.3	+0.6
Majority		552	9.4	+3.6
Turnout		5,857	32.2	−3.3
Morley Borough Independents hold		Swing		

=== Otley & Yeadon ===
Otley & Yeadon
Party	Candidate	Votes	%	±%
Liberal Democrats	Colin Campbell*	3,546	47.0	+2.0
Labour Co-op	Steve Clapcote	1,695	22.5	+1.1
Conservative	Lee Farmer	939	12.5	−4.3
Green	Mick Bradley	928	12.3	+0.7
Yorkshire	Claire Buxton	405	5.4	+0.8
Majority		1,851	24.5	+1.0
Turnout		7,542	42.4	−4.5
Liberal Democrats hold		Swing		

=== Pudsey ===
Pudsey
Party	Candidate	Votes	%	±%
Conservative	Simon Seary*	4,145	55.0	−1.5
Labour	Ryan Holroyd-Case	2,825	37.2	+5.8
Green	Suzanne Ward	386	5.1	0.0
Liberal Democrats	Robert Jacques	210	2.8	−0.2
Majority		1,320	17.4	−7.6
Turnout		7,598	39.8	−2.8
Conservative hold		Swing		

=== Rothwell ===
Rothwell
Party	Candidate	Votes	%	±%
Liberal Democrats	Stewart Golton*	3,304	54.3	+19.9
Labour	Karen Bruce	1,735	28.5	−4.4
Conservative	Joe Boycott	737	12.1	−10.9
Yorkshire	Sean McDonald	168	2.8	−2.5
Green	Ali Aliremzioglu	137	2.2	−1.3
Majority		1,569	25.8	+24.3
Turnout		6,090	38.1	−3.6
Liberal Democrats hold		Swing		

=== Roundhay ===
Roundhay
Party	Candidate	Votes	%	±%
Labour	Zara Hussain*	4,165	60.7	+4.6
Labour	Jordan Bowden	3,898	56.8	−1.4
Green	Paul Ellis	1,650	24.1	+7.7
Conservative	Elayna Cohen	1,418	20.7	−0.5
Conservative	Spencer Weiner	1,261	18.4	−1.5
Liberal Democrats	Jon Hannah	942	13.7	+1.1
Alliance for Green Socialism	Malcolm Christie	400	5.8	+0.9
Majority		2,515	36.7	−0.4
Turnout		6,859	39.2	−8.3
Labour hold		Swing		
Labour hold		Swing		

=== Temple Newsam ===
Temple Newsam
Party	Candidate	Votes	%	±%
Labour	Debra Coupar*	2,920	49.6	+5.1
Conservative	Jonathan Firth	2,350	39.9	−4.4
Liberal Democrats	Keith Norman	305	5.2	−0.2
Green	Shahab Adris	281	4.8	−0.3
Majority		570	9.7	+9.7
Turnout		5,885	35.3	−2.1
Labour hold		Swing		

=== Weetwood ===
Weetwood
Party	Candidate	Votes	%	±%
Labour Co-op	Izaak Wilson	3,331	48.9	+1.7
Liberal Democrats	Sharon Slinger	2,251	33.1	+3.7
Green	Christopher Foren	577	8.5	−1.6
Conservative	Angelo Basu	575	8.4	−4.2
SDP	Rob Walker	54	0.8	N/A
Majority		1,080	15.9	−1.9
Turnout		6,807	42.6	−3.3
Labour gain from Liberal Democrats		Swing		

=== Wetherby ===
Wetherby
Party	Candidate	Votes	%	±%
Conservative	Norma Harrington*	3,514	47.0	−11.0
Green	Penny Stables	2,568	34.4	+12.1
Labour	Luke Dixon-Murrow	878	11.7	−0.9
Liberal Democrats	Lesley McIntee	484	6.5	−0.2
Majority		946	12.7	−23.0
Turnout		7,473	44.9	−2.9
Conservative hold		Swing		
