= 2019 Leeds City Council election =

- 2 May 2019

33 of the 99 seats on Leeds City Council 50 seats needed for a majority
- Turnout: 31.0% (▼3.5%)
	First party	Second party	Third party
Leader	Judith Blake	Andrew Carter
Party	Labour	Conservative	Liberal Democrats
Last election	61 seats, 46.4%	22 seats, 28.2%	6 seats, 9.6%
Seats won	19	7	3
Seats after	57	23	8
Seat change	▼4	▲1	▲2
Popular vote	66,058	39,319	20,090
Percentage	38.4%	28.2%	11.7%
Swing	▼8.0pp	▼5.4pp	▲2.1pp
	Fourth party	Fifth party	Sixth party
Party	Morley Borough Independents	Green	Garforth and Swillington Independents
Last election	5 seats, 2.9%	2 seats, 6.1%	3 seats, 2.6%
Seats won	2	1	1
Seats after	5	3	3
Seat change	Steady	▲1	Steady
Popular vote	5,641	19,885	4,007
Percentage	3.3%	11.6%	2.3%
Swing	▲0.4pp	▲5.5pp	▼0.3pp
- Labour in red (19), Conservatives in blue (7), Liberal Democrats in yellow (3), Morley Borough Independents in dark green (2), Garforth & Swillington Independents in bright green (1) and Greens in light green (1).
Council control before election
Majority administration
Labour
Council control after election
Majority administration
Labour

The 2019 Leeds City Council election took place on Thursday 2 May 2019 to elect members of Leeds City Council in England. It was held on the same day as other UK local elections across England and Northern Ireland.

As per the election cycle, one third of the council's 99 seats were up for election. This followed the re-election of all of the 99 council seats in the 2018 all-out council election. It had resulted from an electoral ward boundary review and saw the election of three councillors for each of the 33 electoral wards and their new ward boundaries. The third-placed candidate elected in every ward was granted a single year term and their seats are up for election this year.

Elected councillors were granted the usual four-year term until 2023 in order to return to the typical election cycle of elections in three of every four years.

The Labour Party maintained their majority control of the council despite losing four seats, also retaining their one Calverley and Farsley councillor by 27 votes.

== Election summary ==
Leeds City Council Election Result 2019
Party	Candidates						Votes		
Party	Stood	Elected	Gained	Unseated	Net	% of total	%	No.	Net %
Labour	33	19	0	4	▼4	57.6	38.4	66,058	-8.0
Conservative	33	7	1	0	▲1	21.2	28.2	39,319	-5.4
Liberal Democrats	32	3	2	0	▲2	9.1	11.7	20,090	+2.1
Green	32	1	1	0	▲1	3.0	11.6	19,885	+5.5
UKIP	16	0	0	0	0	0.0	4.8	8,293	+4.4
Morley Borough Independent	2	2	0	0	0	6.1	3.3	5,641	+0.4
Garforth and Swillington Independents	1	1	0	0	0	3.0	2.3	4,007	-0.3
For Britain	8	0	0	0	0	0.0	1.0	1,670	+0.8
East Leeds Independents	2	0	0	0	0	0.0	0.8	1,390	+0.2
SDP	4	0	0	0	0	0.0	0.7	1,221	+0.5
Independent	2	0	0	0	0	0.0	0.6	1,097	-0.1
Yorkshire	3	0	0	0	0	0.0	0.6	1,097	+0.2
Save Our Beeston and Holbeck Independents	1	0	0	0	0	0.0	0.6	1,079	-0.1
Women's Equality	3	0	0	0	0	0.0	0.4	611	+0.4
Socialist	3	0	0	0	0	0.0	0.4	610	New
Alliance for Green Socialism	3	0	0	0	0	0.0	0.2	325	+0.1
English Democrat	1	0	0	0	0	0.0	0.1	109	New
Total	175	33	4	4	0	100.0	100.0	172,076	▲366,927

The election result had the following consequences for the political composition of the council:

Party	2018 election	New council
Labour	61	57
Conservative	22	23
Liberal Democrat	6	8
Morley Borough Independents	5	5
Garforth and Swillington Independents	3	3
Green	2	3
Total	99	99
Working majority	23	15

== Councillors who did not stand for re-election ==
Councillor/s who did not stand for re-election (4)
Councillor	Ward	First elected	Party	Reason	Successor
Gerry Harper	Little London & Woodhouse	1995	Labour	stood down	Abigail Marshall Katung (Labour)
Alison Lowe	Armley	1990	Labour	stood down	Lou Cunningham (Labour)
Michael Lyons	Temple Newsam	1980	Labour	stood down	Nicole Sharpe (Labour)
Keith Wakefield	Kippax & Methley	1988	Labour	stood down	Mirelle Midgley (Labour)

Incumbent Morley Borough Independent councillor, Tom Leadley, did not stand again for Morley North ward, standing unsuccessfully in the neighbouring ward of Ardsley & Robin Hood.

== Ward results ==
=== Adel & Wharfedale ===
Adel & Wharfedale
Party	Candidate	Votes	%	±%
Conservative	Billy Flynn*	2,952	46.6	−7.2
Labour	Nigel Gill	1,235	19.5	−2.1
Liberal Democrats	Ian Dowling	1,159	18.3	+4.8
Green	Lesley Jeffries	491	7.8	−0.4
UKIP	Andrew Greenwood	491	7.8	N/A
Majority		1,717	27.1	−14.3
Turnout		6,352	40.1	−5.1
Conservative hold		Swing	-7.4	

=== Alwoodley ===
Alwoodley
Party	Candidate	Votes	%	±%
Conservative	Peter Harrand*	3,417	54.8	+1.5
Labour	Andrea McKenna	1,663	26.7	−6.0
Liberal Democrats	Alan Taylor	577	9.2	+0.5
Green	Gideon Jones	335	5.4	−3.3
Women's Equality	Louise Jennings	186	3.0	N/A
Alliance for Green Socialism	Brian Jackson	60	1.0	−1.7
Majority		1,754	28.1	+6.5
Turnout		6,290	36	−5.5
Conservative hold		Swing	+5.1	

=== Ardsley & Robin Hood ===
Ardsley & Robin Hood
Party	Candidate	Votes	%	±%
Labour Co-op	Lisa Mulherin*	1,738	35.7	−1.5
Conservative	Mike Foster	1,238	25.4	−9.7
Independent	Tom Leadley (Note: Leadley had been a Morley Borough Independent councillor for Morley North ward and his campaign was supported by the Morley Borough Independents.)	798	16.4	N/A
UKIP	Lindon Dove	596	12.2	N/A
Green	Rich Daley	249	5.1	−4.2
Liberal Democrats	Ben Ward	225	4.6	−1.5
SDP	Daniel Whetstone	28	0.6	N/A
Majority		500	10.3	+3.3
Turnout		4,902	28.1	−2.8
Labour Co-op hold		Swing	+1.7	

=== Armley ===
Armley
Party	Candidate	Votes	%	±%
Labour	Lou Cunningham	2,477	60.7	+6.0
Green	Keith Whittaker	544	13.3	−3.1
Conservative	Cormac Trigg	415	10.2	−4.5
For Britain	Jim Miller	366	8.9	+3.1
Liberal Democrats	Dan Walker	226	5.5	−3.2
Socialist	Nina Brown	53	1.3	N/A
Majority		1,933	47.4	+8.2
Turnout		4,111	24.7	−2.1
Labour hold		Swing	+4.1	

=== Beeston & Holbeck ===
Beeston & Holbeck
Party	Candidate	Votes	%	±%
Labour	Andrew Scopes*	2,033	47.5	+1.1
Save Our Beeston and Holbeck Independents	Laura Walton	1,079	25.2	−0.9
UKIP	Bill Palfreman	349	8.2	N/A
Conservative	Robert Winfield	326	7.6	−2.6
Green	Alaric Hall	302	7.1	0.0
Liberal Democrats	Jarrod Gaines	187	4.4	+0.3
Majority		954	22.3	−4.7
Turnout		4,293	25.2	−3.6
Labour hold		Swing	-2.4	

=== Bramley & Stanningley ===
Bramley & Stanningley
Party	Candidate	Votes	%	±%
Labour	Julie Heselwood*	1,942	48.6	−8.6
UKIP	David Woodhead	581	14.5	N/A
Conservative	Alex Nancolas	417	10.4	−5.6
Liberal Democrats	Liz Bee	387	9.7	−2.2
Green	Clive Lord	351	8.8	−4.1
For Britain	Anne Murgatroyd	218	5.4	−5.7
English Democrat	Dean Locke	109	2.7	N/A
Majority		1,361	34.1	−6.1
Turnout		4,033	23.9	−2.3
Labour hold		Swing	-10.4	

=== Burmantofts & Richmond Hill ===
Burmantofts & Richmond Hill
Party	Candidate	Votes	%	±%
Labour	Denise Ragan*	2,052	56.5	−4.0
East Leeds Independents	Geoff Holloran	718	19.8	+3.0
Liberal Democrats	David Hollingsworth	392	10.8	−4.4
Green	John Barlow	261	7.2	−3.4
Conservative	Louisa Singh	211	5.8	−3.2
Majority		1,334	36.7	−6.3
Turnout		3,672	22.8	−2.0
Labour hold		Swing	-3.2	

=== Calverley & Farsley ===
Calverley & Farsley
Party	Candidate	Votes	%	±%
Labour	Peter Carlill*	2,891	43.5	+1.7
Conservative	Jas Singh	2,864	43.1	+2.0
Green	Ellen Graham	643	9.7	−0.2
Liberal Democrats	Kate Arbuckle	242	3.6	−1.6
Majority		27	0.4	−10.5
Turnout		6,695	36.9	−3.7
Labour hold		Swing	+5.7	

=== Chapel Allerton ===
Chapel Allerton
Party	Candidate	Votes	%	±%
Labour	Jane Dowson*	4,243	72.1	+2.9
Green	Bobak Walker	701	11.9	+1.6
Conservative	Shaz Ahad	404	6.9	−3.0
Liberal Democrats	Rory Mason	353	6.0	−2.9
Alliance for Green Socialism	Mike Davies	185	3.1	−2.5
Majority		3,542	60.2	+7.3
Turnout		5,955	33.7	−4.4
Labour hold		Swing	+2.7	

=== Cross Gates & Whinmoor ===
Cross Gates & Whinmoor
Party	Candidate	Votes	%	±%
Labour	Jessica Lennox*	2,095	43.8	+6.2
Conservative	Paula Hayes	995	20.8	−2.3
UKIP	Harvey Alexander	960	20.1	+11.1
Green	Ben Goldthorp	391	8.2	−1.4
Liberal Democrats	Roderic Parker	286	6.0	+0.1
SDP	David Creasser	58	1.2	N/A
Majority		1,100	23.0	+6.3
Turnout		4,823	26.4	−5.4
Labour hold		Swing	+2.9	

=== Farnley & Wortley ===
Farnley & Wortley
Party	Candidate	Votes	%	±%
Green	Ann Forsaith	2,010	41.1	+4.5
Labour	Matt Gibson*	1,798	36.7	−3.0
UKIP	Patrick Woods	659	13.5	N/A
Conservative	Hayley Nancolas	332	6.8	−5.8
Liberal Democrats	Maria Frank	96	2.0	−1.0
Majority		212	4.4	−1.1
Turnout		4,917	27.4	−2.8
Green gain from Labour		Swing	-1.1	

=== Garforth & Swillington ===
Garforth & Swillington
Party	Candidate	Votes	%	±%
Garforth and Swillington Independents	Suzanne McCormack*	4,007	62.9	+8.6
Labour	Mark Pratt	1,077	16.9	−1.8
Conservative	Linda Richards	837	13.1	−3.2
For Britain	Michael Bolton	265	4.2	+2.1
Liberal Democrats	Mitchell Galdas	186	2.9	+0.5
Majority		2,930	46.0	+1.1
Turnout		6,399	39.7	−10
Garforth and Swillington Independents hold		Swing	+0.6	

=== Gipton & Harehills ===
Gipton & Harehills
Party	Candidate	Votes	%	±%
Labour	Kamila Maqsood*	3,426	77.6	+9.4
Green	Lynne Caulfield	286	6.5	−1.1
Conservative	Robert Harris	276	6.3	−1.7
Liberal Democrats	Ashley Mark Cresswell	206	4.7	−2.5
Socialist	Iain Dalton	113	2.6	−4.3
SDP	Shaff Sheikh	108	2.4	N/A
Majority		3,140	71.1	+8.7
Turnout		4,475	26.6	−4.7
Labour hold		Swing	+4.2	

=== Guiseley & Rawdon ===
Guiseley & Rawdon
Party	Candidate	Votes	%	±%
Conservative	Paul Wadsworth*	2,836	40.6	−1.4
Labour Co-op	Eleanor Thomson	1,825	26.1	−8.3
Yorkshire	Bob Buxton	899	12.9	−6.7
Green	Mark Rollinson	746	10.7	−6.2
Liberal Democrats	Christine Glover	386	5.5	+0.4
Independent	Roger Tattersall	299	4.3	N/A
Majority		1,011	14.5	+4.0
Turnout		7,033	38.2	−4.1
Conservative hold		Swing	+2.0	

=== Harewood ===
Harewood
Party	Candidate	Votes	%	±%
Conservative	Ryan Stephenson*	3,891	69.4	+4.9
Green	David Corry	768	13.7	−1.1
Labour	Zahid Noor	627	11.2	−1.0
Liberal Democrats	Dan Cook	321	5.7	−8.0
Majority		3,264	55.7	+10.4
Turnout		5,710	38.6	−3.0
Conservative hold		Swing	+3.8	

=== Headingley & Hyde Park ===
Headingley & Hyde Park
Party	Candidate	Votes	%	±%
Labour	Neil Walshaw*	2,055	53.8	−4.6
Green	Tim Goodall	1,066	27.9	+0.4
Liberal Democrats	Penny Goodman	425	11.1	+0.5
Conservative	Steven Rowley	146	3.8	−0.6
Yorkshire	Anthony Greaux	67	1.8	N/A
Women's Equality	Caroline Ann Hunt	60	1.6	−6.9
Majority		989	25.9	−4.4
Turnout		3,839	23.1	+0.1
Labour hold		Swing	-2.2	

=== Horsforth ===
Horsforth
Party	Candidate	Votes	%	±%
Conservative	Jackie Shemilt*	2,625	37.4	+2.7
Labour	John Garvani	1,878	26.7	−5.3
Liberal Democrats	Simon Mark Dowling	1,339	19.1	−6.7
Green	Rosa Shaw	838	11.9	−2.9
UKIP	Paul Hellyer	337	4.8	N/A
Majority		747	10.7	+2.2
Turnout		7,065	40.6	−3.2
Conservative hold		Swing	+1.1	

=== Hunslet & Riverside ===
Hunslet & Riverside
Party	Candidate	Votes	%	±%
Labour	Paul Wray*	2,012	48.8	+2.1
Green	Ed Carlisle	1,766	42.9	+4.8
Conservative	Jordan Young	192	4.7	−4.3
Liberal Democrats	Benedict Turner-Chastney	149	3.6	−0.3
Majority		246	6	−7
Turnout		4,167	25.6	−1.8
Labour hold		Swing	-5.0	

=== Killingbeck & Seacroft ===
Killingbeck & Seacroft
Party	Candidate	Votes	%	±%
Labour	Katie Dye*	1,751	46.3	−13.1
East Leeds Independents	Catherine Dobson	672	17.8	−5.3
UKIP	Peter Morgan	579	15.3	N/A
Conservative	Andrew Martin	378	10.0	−4.2
Green	Colin Noble	227	6.0	N/A
Yorkshire	Matthew Clover	131	3.5	−8.9
For Britain	Adam Ramoth	41	1.1	N/A
Majority		1,079	28.5	−4.0
Turnout		3,802	22.2	−3.5
Labour hold		Swing	-2.0	

=== Kippax & Methley ===
Kippax & Methley
Party	Candidate	Votes	%	±%
Labour	Mirelle Midgley	2,149	47.4	−4.5
Conservative	James Egan	1,155	25.5	+0.9
Green	Dylan Brown	950	21.0	+7.2
Liberal Democrats	Conrad Hart-Brooke	280	6.2	−0.7
Majority		994	21.9	−9.1
Turnout		4,658	28.3	−4.57
Labour hold		Swing	-4.6	

=== Kirkstall ===
Kirkstall
Party	Candidate	Votes	%	±%
Labour	John Illingworth*	2,959	62.5	−5.5
Green	Victoria Smith	682	14.4	−3.9
UKIP	David Barlow	497	10.5	N/A
Liberal Democrats	Edward Anthony Richardson	312	6.6	−1.7
Conservative	Liam Michael Kenrick-Bailey	283	6.0	−6.1
Majority		2,277	48.1	−8.1
Turnout		4,753	30.7	−1.5
Labour hold		Swing	-0.8	

=== Little London & Woodhouse ===
Little London & Woodhouse
Party	Candidate	Votes	%	±%
Labour	Abigail Marshall Katung	1,749	68.2	−2.9
Green	Gavin Andrews	391	15.2	−2.5
Liberal Democrats	James Thomas Mock	142	5.5	−3.5
Conservative	Amy Green	140	5.5	−2.8
UKIP	Chris Jackson	124	4.8	N/A
Socialist	Michael Johnson	18	0.7	N/A
Majority		1,358	43.0	−20.1
Turnout		2,573	20.6	+5.0
Labour hold		Swing	-0.9	

=== Middleton Park ===
Middleton Park
Party	Candidate	Votes	%	±%
Labour	Paul Truswell*	1,879	43.2	−8.5
SDP	Wayne Dixon	1,027	23.6	−3.3
UKIP	Will Lockwood	831	19.1	N/A
Conservative	Hugh Findlay	259	6.0	−7.6
Green	Eunice Delali Agbemafle	212	4.9	N/A
Liberal Democrats	Robert Jacques	137	3.2	−3.2
Majority		852	19.6	−27.0
Turnout		4,362	22.4	−1.2
Labour hold		Swing	-9.6	

=== Moortown ===
Moortown
Party	Candidate	Votes	%	±%
Labour	Mohammed Shahzad*	2,940	48.2	+1.1
Conservative	Rob Speed	1,154	18.9	−3.1
Green	Rachel Hartshorne	1,008	16.5	+0.6
Liberal Democrats	David Dresser	994	16.3	+3.0
Majority		1,786	29.3	−4.4
Turnout		6,174	36.02	−7.28
Labour hold		Swing	-0.1	

=== Morley North ===
Since vacating his seat at the 2018 Election to stand for Morley South ward, Robert Finnigan was re-elected to the council whilst incumbent MBI councillor Tom Leadley stood in Ardsley & Robin Hood ward.

Morley North
Party	Candidate	Votes	%	±%
Morley Borough Independent	Robert Finnigan	3,238	60.0	+13.9
Labour Co-op	Jonathan Leng	881	16.3	−12.0
Conservative	Cameron Stephenson	782	14.5	−4.6
Green	Fiona Love	362	6.7	N/A
Liberal Democrats	James Michael Spencer	137	2.5	−2.2
Majority		2,357	43.7	+1.6
Turnout		5,445	30.3	−3.2
Morley Borough Independent hold		Swing	+8.4	

=== Morley South ===
Morley South
Party	Candidate	Votes	%	±%
Morley Borough Independent	Wyn Kidger*	2,403	50.5	+11.1
Labour Co-op	Pete Compton	1,248	26.2	−7.9
Conservative	Lewis Jones	601	12.6	−3.5
Green	Chris Bell	375	7.9	−3.1
Liberal Democrats	Peter Richard Andrews	129	2.8	0.0
Majority		1,145	24.3	+16.8
Turnout		4,811	27.5	−3.2
Morley Borough Independent hold		Swing	+9.1	

=== Otley & Yeadon ===
Otley & Yeadon
Party	Candidate	Votes	%	±%
Liberal Democrats	Ryk Downes*	3,436	49.6	+1.9
Labour	Elliot Nathan	1,347	19.5	−9.2
Green	Mick Bradley	901	13.0	−3.2
Conservative	Stewart Harper	645	9.3	−5.0
UKIP	John Adrian Hook	429	6.2	N/A
For Britain	Tom Hollings	163	2.4	−0.7
Majority		2,089	30.1	+11.5
Turnout		6,985	39.6	−3.8
Liberal Democrats hold		Swing	+6.8	

=== Pudsey ===
Pudsey
Party	Candidate	Votes	%	±%
Conservative	Trish Smith	2,661	41.4	+1.1
Labour	Richard Lewis*	2,417	37.6	−3.8
UKIP	Lee Stuart Jackson	569	8.8	N/A
Green	Catherine Harrison	462	7.2	−0.4
Liberal Democrats	Jude Arbuckle	244	3.8	+0.4
For Britain	Lorraine Ida Nellis	82	1.3	N/A
Majority		244	3.8	−2.1
Turnout		6,455	34.5	−3.7
Conservative gain from Labour		Swing	-0.4	

=== Rothwell ===
Rothwell
Party	Candidate	Votes	%	±%
Liberal Democrats	Diane Chapman	2,206	42.0	+6.4
Labour	Karen Bruce*	1,731	32.9	−5.5
Conservative	Joe Boycott	623	11.9	−8.8
For Britain	Simon Michael Crowe	409	7.8	N/A
Green	Ali Aliremzioglu	288	5.5	−0.4
Majority		475	9.1	−4.5
Turnout		5,306	33.1	−4.6
Liberal Democrats gain from Labour		Swing	-1.4	

=== Roundhay ===
Roundhay
Party	Candidate	Votes	%	±%
Labour	Jacob Goddard*	3,021	43.9	−8.8
Independent	Tony Quinn	945	13.7	−3.5
Conservative	Elayna Cohen	876	12.7	−8.5
Green	Paul Ellis	807	11.7	−1.2
Liberal Democrats	Jon Hannah	575	8.4	−2.9
Women's Equality	Hannah Barham-Brown	365	5.3	N/A
UKIP	Tony Roberts	212	3.0	N/A
Alliance for Green Socialism	Malcolm Christie	80	1.2	−3.8
Majority		2,076	30.2	−2.2
Turnout		6,900	39.7	−5.4
Labour hold		Swing	-0.1	

=== Temple Newsam ===
Temple Newsam
Party	Candidate	Votes	%	±%
Labour	Nicole Sharpe	1,947	38.7	−7.4
Conservative	Liz Hayes	1,549	30.8	−8.5
UKIP	Ian Greenberg	702	14.0	N/A
Green	Shahab Saqib Adris	373	7.4	−3.9
Liberal Democrats	Keith Norman	330	6.6	−2.3
For Britain	Billy Baldwin	126	2.5	N/A
Majority		398	7.9	0.9
Turnout		5,068	30.7	−4.5
Labour hold		Swing	-1.0	

=== Weetwood ===
Weetwood
Party	Candidate	Votes	%	±%
Liberal Democrats	Chris Howley	2,574	41.4	+3.0
Labour	James Gibson*	2,379	38.2	−3.5
Green	Martin Hemingway	521	8.4	−6.4
UKIP	John Parsons	377	6.1	N/A
Conservative	Angelo Basu	373	6.0	−4.7
Majority		195	3.2	−0.1
Turnout		6,208	41.5	+0.7
Liberal Democrats gain from Labour		Swing	+0.1	

=== Wetherby ===
Wetherby
Party	Candidate	Votes	%	±%
Conservative	Gerald Wilkinson*	3,466	56.9	−7.1
Liberal Democrats	David Hopps	1,452	23.8	+5.1
Labour	Paul Ratcliffe	593	9.7	−4.1
Green	Ruth Corry	580	9.5	−1.6
Majority		2,014	32.1	−6.6
Turnout		6,198	38.6	TBC
Conservative hold		Swing	-3.6	

== By-elections between 2019 and 2020 ==
Wetherby by-election 12 December 2019 replacing Gerald Wilkinson (deceased)
Party	Candidate	Votes	%	±%
Conservative	Linda Richards	7,181	57.7	+0.8
Liberal Democrats	David Hopps	2,373	19.1	−4.7
Labour	Michael Bailey	1,906	15.3	+5.6
Green	Judith Dahlgreen	916	7.4	−2.1
Majority		4,808	38.6	+6.5
Turnout		12,449	75.3	+36.7
Conservative hold		Swing		
