= Morley North (ward) =

Electoral ward in Leeds, England

- Morley North highlighted within Leeds
- Population: 18,282 (2023 electorate)
- Metropolitan borough: City of Leeds
- Metropolitan county: West Yorkshire
- Region: Yorkshire and the Humber
- Country: England
- Sovereign state: United Kingdom
- UK Parliament: Leeds South West and Morley
- Councillors: Simon Brown (Morley Borough Independents); Terry Grayshon (Morley Borough Independents); Jonathan Graves (Reform UK)

Morley North is an electoral ward of Leeds City Council in south west Leeds, West Yorkshire, covering Churwell to the north of Morley town and villages of Drighlington and Gildersome.

== Boundaries ==
The Morley North ward includes the civil parishes of:

- Drighlington
- Gildersome
- Morley (north western section including Churwell, part of Morley Town Council)

== Councillors ==
Election	Councillor	Councillor	Councillor
1973	B.B. Barker (Con)	R.J.W. Binks (Con)	R. Verity (Con)
1975	B.B. Barker (Con)	R.J.W. Binks (Con)	R. Verity (Con)
1976	B.B. Barker (Con)	B. Senior (Con)	R. Verity (Con)
1978	B.B. Barker (Con)	B. Senior (Con)	R. Verity (Con)
1979	B.B. Barker (Con)	B. Senior (Con)	Philip Jones (Lab)
1980	Roger Cordingley (Lab)	B.L. Cook (Lab)	Philip Jones (Lab)
1982	Roger Cordingley (Lab)	R. Verity (Con)	Philip Jones (Lab)
1983	Graham Marshall (Con)	R. Verity (Con)	Philip Jones (Lab)
1984	Graham Marshall (Con)	R. Verity (Con)	Philip Jones (Lab)
1986	Graham Marshall (Con)	Philippa Fitzpatrick (Lab)	Philip Jones (Lab)
1987	R.J.W. Binks (Con)	Philippa Fitzpatrick (Lab)	Philip Jones (Lab)
1988	R.J.W. Binks (Con)	Philippa Fitzpatrick (Lab)	Philip Jones (Lab)
1989 by-election	R.J.W. Binks (Con)	Frances Jones (Lab)	Philip Jones (Lab)
1990	R.J.W. Binks (Con)	Frances Jones (Lab)	Philip Jones (Lab)
1991	Gordon Morrison (Lab)	Frances Jones (Lab)	Philip Jones (Lab)
1992	Gordon Morrison (Lab)	Frances Jones (Lab)	Alan Barraclough (Con)
1994	Gordon Morrison (Lab)	Frances Jones (Lab)	Alan Barraclough (Con)
1995	Philip Jones (Lab)	Frances Jones (Lab)	Alan Barraclough (Con)
1996	Philip Jones (Lab)	Frances Jones (Lab)	Michael Dawson (Lab)
1998	Philip Jones (Lab)	Frances Jones (Lab)	Michael Dawson (Lab)
1999	Philip Jones (Lab)	Frances Jones (Lab)	Michael Dawson (Lab)
2000	Philip Jones (Lab)	Frances Jones (Lab)	Michael Dawson (Lab) (Note: In the next year, Dawson resigned as a councillor and a by-election was called for the same day as the 2001 general election.)
2001 by-election	Philip Jones (Lab)	Frances Jones (Lab)	Jayne Hill (Lab)
2002	Philip Jones (Lab)	Robert Finnigan (Ind) (Note: Finnigan had previously been a Labour councillor for Middleton ward from 1995 to 1999.)	Jayne Hill (Lab)
2003	Thomas Leadley (Ind)	Robert Finnigan (Ind)	Jayne Hill (Lab)
2004	Thomas Leadley (MBI) (Note: 'MBI' is an acronym for the Morley Borough Independents.)	Robert Finnigan (MBI)	Stewart McArdle (MBI)
May 2005	Thomas Leadley (MBI)	Robert Finnigan (MBI)	Stewart McArdle (Ind) (Note: McArdle resigned from the Morley Borough Independents to sit as an independent, citing being "cheesed off... [with an] utter lack of communication" but there was no animosity between him and his former party colleagues.)
2006	Thomas Leadley (MBI)	Robert Finnigan (MBI)	Stewart McArdle (Ind)
2007	Thomas Leadley (MBI)	Robert Finnigan (MBI)	Bob Gettings (MBI)
2008	Thomas Leadley (MBI)	Robert Finnigan (MBI)	Bob Gettings (MBI)
2010	Thomas Leadley (MBI)	Robert Finnigan (MBI)	Bob Gettings (MBI)
2011	Thomas Leadley (MBI)	Robert Finnigan (MBI)	Bob Gettings (MBI)
2012	Thomas Leadley (MBI)	Robert Finnigan (MBI)	Bob Gettings (MBI)
2014	Thomas Leadley (MBI)	Robert Finnigan (MBI)	Bob Gettings (MBI)
2015	Thomas Leadley (MBI)	Robert Finnigan (MBI)	Bob Gettings (MBI)
2016	Thomas Leadley (MBI)	Robert Finnigan (MBI) (Note: Finnigan chose not to stand again for the ward at the next election in 2018 to stand - albeit unsuccessfully - for Morley South ward.)	Bob Gettings (MBI)
2018	Thomas Leadley (MBI)	Andrew Hutchison (MBI)	Bob Gettings (MBI)
2019	Robert Finnigan (MBI)	Andrew Hutchison (MBI)	Bob Gettings (MBI)
2021	Robert Finnigan (MBI)	Andrew Hutchison (MBI)	Bob Gettings (MBI)
2022	Robert Finnigan (MBI)	Andrew Hutchison (MBI)	Bob Gettings (MBI)
2023	Robert Finnigan (MBI)	Andrew Hutchison (MBI)	Bob Gettings (MBI)
2024	Robert Finnigan (MBI)	Simon Brown (MBI)	Bob Gettings (Ind) (Note: Gettings had previously resigned from the Morley Borough Independents prior to the election. He joined fellow former MBI councillor for Morley South, Wyn Kidger, and previously Conservative councillor for Pudsey, Trish Smith, to form the Local Independent Party grouping on the council in May 2024. This grouping came to an end in May 2025 following both Kidger's resignation from the council and Smith's defection to Reform UK.)
2026	Jonathan Graves* (RUK)	Simon Brown* (MBI)	Terry Grayshon* (MBI)

indicates seat up for re-election. indicates seat up for election following resignation or death of sitting councillor. indicates councillor defection. * indicates incumbent councillor.

== Elections since 2010 ==
=== May 2026 ===
2026
Party	Candidate	Votes	%	±%
Morley Borough Independents	Terry Grayshon	2,780		
Reform	Jonathan Graves	2,707		
Morley Borough Independents	Simon William Kimberley	2,627		
Reform	Dinah Rose Jones	2,515		
Labour	Edward John Brown	892		
Labour	Jonny Kelsey	743		
Green	Amber Conyers-Davies	736		
Conservative	Pauline Barron	678		
Green	Kasim Rasool	657		
Conservative	Louisa Mary Singh	407		
Liberal Democrats	James Trueman	313		
Liberal Democrats	Mihai Marcelin Barticel	173		
SDP	Nigel Perry	21		
Turnout			42.8	
Rejected ballots		13		
Registered electors		18,485		
Morley Borough Independents gain from Independent		Swing		
Reform gain from Morley Borough Independents		Swing		

=== May 2024 ===
2024
Party	Candidate	Votes	%	±%
Morley Borough Independent	Simon Brown	2,317	37.8	−5.8
Labour Co-op	Stuart Bruce	1,529	25.0	+0.1
Independent	Jill Gettings-Bellhouse	998	16.3	New
Conservative	Lalit Suryawanshi	780	12.7	−2.4
Green	Evelyn Jeffries	285	4.7	−0.9
Liberal Democrats	James Trueman	197	3.2	−2.5
SDP	Thomas Foster	19	0.3	−0.1
Majority		788	12.8	−5.8
Turnout		6,154	33.7	+3.0
Morley Borough Independent hold		Swing	-2.9	

=== May 2023 ===
2023
Party	Candidate	Votes	%	±%
Morley Borough Independents	Robert Finnigan*	2,448	43.6	−6.8
Labour Co-op	Patrick Davey	1,400	24.9	+2.6
Conservative	Dom Eatwell	848	15.1	−2.0
Liberal Democrats	James Trueman	323	5.7	+4.1
Green	Rebecca Kellett	313	5.6	−2.6
Reform	Jonathan Thackray	252	4.5	N/A
SDP	Richard Cowles	25	0.4	N/A
Majority		1,048	18.6	−9.4
Turnout		5,620	30.7	−3.0
Morley Borough Independents hold		Swing		

=== May 2022 ===
2022
Party	Candidate	Votes	%	±%
Morley Borough Independents	Bob Gettings*	3,101	50.4	+8.4
Labour	Patrick Davey	1,373	22.3	+0.6
Conservative	Lidia Smith	1,052	17.1	−10.7
Green	Aisling Dolan	506	8.2	+2.6
Liberal Democrats	James Spencer	98	1.6	−0.3
Majority		1,728	28.0	+13.8
Turnout		6,153	33.7%	−4.3
Morley Borough Independents hold		Swing		

=== May 2021 ===
2021
Party	Candidate	Votes	%	±%
Morley Borough Independent	Andy Hutchinson*	2,922	42.0	−18.0
Conservative	Alan Shires	1,930	27.8	+13.3
Labour Co-op	Luke Mitchell	1,506	21.7	+5.4
Green	Eunice Agbemafle	389	5.6	−1.1
Liberal Democrats	Penelope Goodman	134	1.9	−0.6
SDP	Nigel Perry	33	0.0	N/A
Majority		992	14.2	−29.5
Turnout		6,953	38.0	+7.7
Morley Borough Independent hold		Swing		

=== May 2019 ===
2019
Party	Candidate	Votes	%	±%
Morley Borough Independent	Robert Finnigan	3,238	60.0	+7.4
Labour Co-op	Johnathan Leng	881	16.3	−9.4
Conservative	Cameron Stephenson	782	14.5	−2.9
Green	Fiona Love	362	6.7	+6.7
Liberal Democrats	James Michael Spencer	137	2.5	−1.8
Majority		2,357	43.7	+1.6
Turnout		5,445	30.3	−3.2
Morley Borough Independent hold		Swing	+8.4	

=== May 2018 ===
2018
Party	Candidate	Votes	%	±%
Morley Borough Independent	Bob Gettings*	3,480	52.6	+2.0
Morley Borough Independent	Andy Hutchison	2,945		
Morley Borough Independent	Thomas Leadley*	2,767		
Labour Co-op	Pete Compton	1,701	25.7	+3.9
Labour Co-op	Steve Clapcote	1,345		
Labour Co-op	Johnathan Leng	1,269		
Conservative	Jason Aldiss	1,149	17.4	+3.1
Conservative	Christopher Dilworth	1,146		
Conservative	Louisa Singh	695		
Liberal Democrats	Philip Mellor	284	4.3	+2.4
Majority		2,529	42.1	+13.3
Turnout		6,009	33.5	+0.7
Morley Borough Independent hold		Swing		
Morley Borough Independent hold		Swing		
Morley Borough Independent hold		Swing		

=== May 2016 ===
2016
Party	Candidate	Votes	%	±%
Morley Borough Independent	Robert Finnigan*	2,891	50.6	+13.3
Labour	Andrew Timothy Scopes	1,245	21.8	−0.1
Conservative	Jason Karl Aldiss	816	14.3	−7.5
UKIP	Peter Morgan	537	9.4	+3.6
Green	Mickayla Ireland	122	2.1	−1.0
Liberal Democrats	Peter Richard Andrews	108	1.9	−0.4
Majority		1,646	28.8	+13.4
Turnout		5,719	32.8	
Morley Borough Independent hold		Swing		

=== May 2015 ===
2015
Party	Candidate	Votes	%	±%
Morley Borough Independent	Bob Gettings*	4,271	37.3	−15.6
Labour	Mark Sewards	2,505	21.9	−1.3
Conservative	Sophie Tempest	2,496	21.8	+9.1
UKIP	Samuel Stead	1,487	13.0	+13.0
Green	Deborah Fenney	354	3.1	+3.1
Liberal Democrats	Peter Andrews	263	2.3	−0.6
TUSC	Karen Cussons	78	0.7	+0.7
Majority		1,766	15.4	−14.3
Turnout		11,454	64.9	
Morley Borough Independent hold		Swing	-7.2	

=== May 2014 ===
2014
Party	Candidate	Votes	%	±%
Morley Borough Independent	Thomas Leadley*	2,759		
Labour	Charlotte Hill	1,181		
UKIP	Luke Senior	1,150		
Conservative	Sophie Tempest	675		
Green	Deborah Fenney	180		
Liberal Democrats	John MacArthur	74		
Majority		1,578		
Turnout		6,019	34.56	
Morley Borough Independent hold		Swing		

=== May 2012 ===
2012
Party	Candidate	Votes	%	±%
Morley Borough Independent	Robert Finnigan*	3,517	61.3	+8.5
Labour	Margaret Foster	1,240	21.6	−1.6
Conservative	David Schofield	519	9.1	−3.6
English Democrat	Tom Redmond	458	8.0	−0.3
Majority		2,277	39.7	+10.0
Turnout		5,734		
Morley Borough Independent hold		Swing	+5.0	

=== May 2011 ===
2011
Party	Candidate	Votes	%	±%
Morley Borough Independent	Bob Gettings*	3,642	52.9	+19.5
Labour	Kathryn Rose	1,599	23.2	+0.5
Conservative	Robin Ghosh	874	12.7	−8.4
English Democrat	Tom Redmond	573	8.3	+8.3
Liberal Democrats	Peter Andrews	199	2.9	−8.6
Majority		2,043	29.7	+19.1
Turnout		6,887	39	
Morley Borough Independent hold		Swing	+9.5	

=== May 2010 ===
2010
Party	Candidate	Votes	%	±%
Morley Borough Independent	Thomas Leadley*	4,063	33.4	−18.3
Labour	David Nagle	2,767	22.7	+9.3
Conservative	Robin Ghosh	2,571	21.1	+9.0
Liberal Democrats	Chris Lovell	1,397	11.5	+8.3
BNP	Tom Redmond	1,378	11.3	−8.3
Majority		1,296	10.6	−21.5
Turnout		12,176	68.2	+28.0
Morley Borough Independent hold		Swing	-13.8	
