= 2008 Leeds City Council election =

- 1 May 2008

33 of the 99 seats on Leeds City Council (and 1 vacancy) 50 seats needed for a majority
- Turnout: 35.76% (▼1.76%)
	First party	Second party	Third party
Leader	Keith Wakefield	Richard Brett	Andrew Carter
Party	Labour	Liberal Democrats	Conservative
Last election	15 seats, 32.5%	8 seats, 19.7%	7 seats, 27.0%
Seats won	13	9	8
Seats after	43	24	22
Seat change	0	0	0
Popular vote	56,124	37,216	59,722
Percentage	28.67%	18.89%	31.41%
	Fourth party	Fifth party	Sixth party
Party	Morley Borough Independents	Green	BNP
Last election	2 seats, 2.7%	1 seats, 3.9%	0 seats, 11.2%
Seats won	2	1	0
Seats after	5	3	1
Seat change	Steady	Steady	Steady
Popular vote	6,379	7,449	22,094
Percentage	3.19%	3.72%	11.35%
- Labour in red (13), Liberal Democrats in yellow (9), Conservatives in blue (8), Morley Borough Independents in dark green (2) and Greens in light green (1).
Council control before election
Coalition
Liberal Democrats and Conservatives
Council control after election
Coalition
Liberal Democrats and Conservatives

The 2008 Leeds City Council election took place on Thursday 1 May 2008 to elect members of Leeds City Council in England.

As per the election cycle, one third of the council's 99 seats were contested, plus an additional vacancy in Calverley and Farsley ward as Amanda Carter stood down. Those seats up for election were those of the first-placed candidate elected for every ward at the 2004 all-out election, who had been granted a four-year term to expire in 2008.

It saw the Liberal Democrat and Conservative coalition administration continue their control of the council. Despite both Labour and the Liberal Democrats winning more seats, the Conservatives won the majority of votes cast for the first time since 1992.

The Liberal Democrats regained a total of 24 seats on the council by defeating former Liberal Democrat-turn-independent and then Conservative councillor for Weetwood ward, Brian Jennings. This had followed Hyde Park and Woodhouse councillor, Kabeer Hussain, defecting from the Liberal Democrats to Labour in October 2007, who he then left less than six months later to sit as an Independent before the 2008 election.

== Election result ==
Leeds local election result 2008
Party	Seats	Gains	Losses	Net gain/loss	Seats %	Votes %	Votes	+/−
Conservative	8	0	0	0	26.5	31.41	59,722	+4.41
Labour	13	0	0	0	38.2	28.67	56,124	-3.83
Liberal Democrats	9	0	0	0	26.5	18.89	37,216	-0.81
BNP	0	0	0	0	0.0	11.35	22,094	+0.15
Green	1	0	0	0	2.9	3.72	7,449	-0.18
Morley Borough Independent	2	0	0	0	5.9	3.19	6,379	+0.49
Alliance for Green Socialism	0	0	0	0	0.0	0.97	1,945	+0.07
Independent	0	0	0	0	0.0	0.77	1,532	-0.03
UKIP	0	0	0	0	0.0	0.9	1,808	0.0
English Democrat	0	0	0	0	0.0	0.14	276	-0.16

This result had the following consequences for the total number of seats on the council after the elections:

Party	2007 election	Prior to election	New council
Labour	43	43	43
Liberal Democrat	24	23	24 (Note: The Liberal Democrats increased their number of council seats by defeating incumbent Weetwood ward councillor, Brian Jennings, who had previously resigned from the Liberal Democrat council group following the 2006 election and joined the Conservatives in May 2007.)
Conservative	22	23 (Note: Former Liberal Democrat and now independent Brian Jennings (Weetwood) joined the Conservatives after the 2007 election. He lost his seat to the Liberal Democrats at the 2008 election.)	22
Morley Borough Independent	5	5	5
Green	3	3	3
BNP	1	1	1
Independent	1 (Note: Former Liberal Democrat councillor, Brian Jennings (Weetwood), was an independent at the time of the 2007 election.)	1 (Note: Kabeer Hussain (Hyde Park and Woodhouse) defected from the Liberal Democrats to Labour in October 2007, leaving the Labour council group less than six months later to sit as an independent. He rejoined the Lib Dems in March 2009.)	1
Total	99	99	
Working majority	-13	-13	-13

== Councillors who did not stand for re-election ==
Councillor/s who did not stand for re-election (3)
Councillor	Ward	First elected	Party	Reason	Successor
Amanda Carter	Calverley & Farsley	1999 (Note: Carter was later elected again for the same ward in 2015, replacing her successor Marjoram.)	Conservative	stood down	Joe Marjoram (Conservative)
Elizabeth Minkin	Kirkstall	1988	Labour	stood down	Lucinda Yeadon (Labour)
David Morton	Headingley	2000	Liberal Democrats	stood down	Jamie Matthews (Liberal Democrats)

Incumbent Labour councillor, Sharon Hamilton (Chapel Allerton), was selected as her party's candidate for Roundhay ward and lost to the Conservative incumbent. Hamilton was later elected for Moortown in 2010.

== Ward results ==
Adel & Wharfedale
Party	Candidate	Votes	%	±%
Conservative	Barry Anderson*	4,377	57.6	+5.9
Liberal Democrats	Christina Shaw	2,020	26.6	−3.4
Labour	Doreen Illingworth	727	9.6	−2.5
BNP	Jason Harland	269	3.5	−0.1
Green	Paul Marchant	202	2.7	+2.7
Majority		2,357	31.0	+9.4
Turnout		7,595	47.6	−0.1
Conservative hold		Swing	+4.6	

Alwoodley
Party	Candidate	Votes	%	±%
Conservative	Ronnie Feldman*	4,059	56.8	+4.6
Labour	Doug Masterton	1,390	19.5	−2.1
Liberal Democrats	John Clay	1,041	14.6	−0.9
UKIP	Warren Hendon	250	3.5	−0.9
BNP	Christine Whitaker	228	3.2	−0.3
Alliance for Green Socialism	Brian Jackson	174	2.4	−0.3
Majority		2,669	37.4	+6.7
Turnout		7,142	40.7	−2.0
Conservative hold		Swing	+3.3	

Ardsley & Robin Hood
Party	Candidate	Votes	%	±%
Labour	Karen Renshaw*	1,696	29.8	−5.5
BNP	Joanna Beverley	1,685	29.6	+2.0
Conservative	Billy Flynn	1,298	22.8	+1.6
Independent	Stewart McArdle	420	7.4	+7.4
Liberal Democrats	Philip Moore	396	7.0	−3.2
UKIP	David Daniel	201	3.5	−2.3
Majority		11	0.2	−7.5
Turnout		5,696	35.5	−0.4
Labour hold		Swing	-3.7	

Armley
Party	Candidate	Votes	%	±%
Labour	Alison Lowe*	2,104	42.9	−3.1
Conservative	Jeremy Kapp	915	18.7	+2.2
BNP	Shaun Fitzpatrick	753	15.4	+2.2
Green	Michael Croke	616	12.6	+0.3
Liberal Democrats	Christopher Lovell	512	10.4	−3.2
Majority		1,189	24.3	−6.9
Turnout		4,900	28.0	−0.8
Labour hold		Swing	-3.4	

Beeston & Holbeck
Party	Candidate	Votes	%	±%
Labour	Angela Gabriel*	1,841	41.7	−2.4
Conservative	Robert Winfield	1,002	22.7	+3.8
BNP	Dean Taylor	663	15.0	+0.1
Liberal Democrats	James Fuller	462	10.5	−2.1
Green	Julie Cuthbert	237	5.4	−0.3
UKIP	Wilfred Woodhouse	207	4.7	+0.9
Majority		839	19.0	−6.3
Turnout		4,412	28.5	−2.1
Labour hold		Swing	-3.1	

Bramley & Stanningley
Party	Candidate	Votes	%	±%
Labour	Denise Atkinson*	2,019	42.2	+1.1
Conservative	Michael Best	1,069	22.4	+6.5
BNP	David Gatenby	628	13.1	−5.7
Liberal Democrats	Adam Slack	541	11.3	−0.3
English Democrat	Dean Locke	276	5.8	−0.5
Green	Pamela Brown	248	5.2	−1.1
Majority		950	19.9	−2.4
Turnout		4,781	28.9	−3.2
Labour hold		Swing	-3.8	

Burmantofts & Richmond Hill
Party	Candidate	Votes	%	±%
Liberal Democrats	Ralph Pryke*	1,852	41.8	−6.4
Labour	Danial Adilypour	1,330	30.0	+0.0
BNP	Mark Collett	919	20.7	+2.2
Conservative	Caroline Anderson	241	5.4	+2.0
Alliance for Green Socialism	Allan House	93	2.1	+2.1
Majority		522	11.8	−6.4
Turnout		4,435	29.4	−2.7
Liberal Democrats hold		Swing	-3.2	

Calverley & Farsley
Party	Candidate	Votes	%	±%
Conservative	Andrew Carter*	4,283	60.2	+6.8
Conservative	Joseph Marjoram	3,159		
Labour	Lorraine Hoy	1,327	18.7	−4.5
Labour	Andrew Jarosz	1,262		
Liberal Democrats	Kate Arbuckle	836	11.8	+0.7
BNP	Jane Hollings	666	9.4	−3.0
BNP	Robert Leary	637		
Liberal Democrats	Chris Read	613		
Majority		2,956	41.6	+11.3
Turnout		7,112	37.0	−4.7
Conservative hold		Swing		
Conservative hold		Swing	+5.6	

Chapel Allerton
Party	Candidate	Votes	%	±%
Labour	Eileen Taylor	2,415	44.2	−7.6
Liberal Democrats	Altaf Hussein	1,222	22.4	+7.8
Conservative	Simon Baker	794	14.5	+1.0
Alliance for Green Socialism	Beverley Samuels	496	9.1	−0.3
Green	Mark Elliot	359	6.6	−1.0
BNP	David Whitaker	177	3.2	+0.0
Majority		1,193	21.8	−15.5
Turnout		5,463	31.6	−2.1
Labour hold		Swing	-7.7	

City & Hunslet
Party	Candidate	Votes	%	±%
Labour	Elizabeth Nash*	1,697	46.8	+3.2
Conservative	Simon Harley	538	14.8	+8.3
Liberal Democrats	Pip Sadler	488	13.5	−1.1
BNP	John Atkinson	436	12.0	+0.4
Independent	Muserat Sujawal	272	7.5	+7.5
Green	Andy Parnham	193	5.3	−0.4
Majority		1,159	32.0	+3.0
Turnout		3,624	19.7	−2.7
Labour hold		Swing	-1.0	

Cross Gates & Whinmoor
Party	Candidate	Votes	%	±%
Labour	Suzi Armitage*	2,368	36.8	−4.9
Conservative	David Schofield	2,233	34.7	+3.1
BNP	John Douglas	979	15.2	+1.0
Liberal Democrats	Ann Norman	577	9.0	−3.4
UKIP	Darren Oddy	276	4.3	+4.3
Majority		135	2.1	−8.0
Turnout		6,433	38.0	+0.2
Labour hold		Swing	-4.0	

Farnley & Wortley
Party	Candidate	Votes	%	±%
Green	David Blackburn*	2,556	44.6	+4.9
Labour	Stephen Towler	1,264	22.0	−5.9
Conservative	Glenn Broadbent	859	15.0	+3.7
BNP	Helen Foster	793	13.8	+0.6
Liberal Democrats	Michael Taylor	233	4.1	−0.6
Alliance for Green Socialism	Declan Normaschild	28	0.5	+0.1
Majority		1,292	22.5	+10.7
Turnout		5,733	32.5	−1.0
Green hold		Swing	+5.4	

Garforth & Swillington
Party	Candidate	Votes	%	±%
Labour	Andrea McKenna*	3,004	42.6	−11.7
Conservative	Louise Turner	2,768	39.2	+7.1
BNP	Winnifred Mowbray	752	10.7	+3.2
Liberal Democrats	Robert Jacques	535	7.6	+1.4
Majority		236	3.3	−18.9
Turnout		7,059	44.7	−4.4
Labour hold		Swing	-9.4	

Gipton & Harehills
Party	Candidate	Votes	%	±%
Liberal Democrats	Alan Taylor*	2,584	42.9	+4.9
Labour	Kamila Maqsood	2,551	42.3	−8.5
BNP	Darran Smith	389	6.5	+0.8
Conservative	Beatrice Greenwood	217	3.6	+0.3
Independent	Katie Wheatley	110	1.8	+1.8
Green	Martin Reed	94	1.6	+0.0
Alliance for Green Socialism	Azar Iqbal	83	1.4	+0.6
Majority		33	0.5	−12.4
Turnout		6,028	38.2	−4.8
Liberal Democrats hold		Swing	+6.7	

Guiseley & Rawdon
Party	Candidate	Votes	%	±%
Conservative	Graham Latty*	3,456	50.8	+3.4
Labour	Mike King	1,664	24.5	−4.2
Liberal Democrats	Cindy Cleasby	834	12.3	−0.1
BNP	Wayne Taylor	436	6.4	+0.5
Green	Colin Avison	347	5.1	+0.1
Alliance for Green Socialism	Gareth Christie	62	0.9	+0.3
Majority		1,792	26.4	+7.7
Turnout		6,799	40.3	−0.4
Conservative hold		Swing	+3.8	

Harewood
Party	Candidate	Votes	%	±%
Conservative	Ann Castle*	4,940	73.3	+5.2
Labour	David Nagle	734	10.9	−2.3
Liberal Democrats	Benjamin Chapman	426	6.3	−0.6
BNP	Martin Gibson	376	5.6	−1.0
Green	Patricia Capstick	210	3.1	−1.4
Alliance for Green Socialism	Fiona Christie	53	0.8	+0.0
Majority		4,206	62.4	+7.4
Turnout		6,739	45.9	−0.6
Conservative hold		Swing	+3.7	

Headingley
Party	Candidate	Votes	%	±%
Liberal Democrats	Jamie Matthews	1,021	41.2	−6.6
Labour	Mohammed Azam	730	29.5	+6.6
Green	Tim Sunderland	344	13.9	−1.1
Conservative	Michael Horwood	318	12.8	+3.4
BNP	Lawrence Hansard	40	1.6	−0.1
Alliance for Green Socialism	Sequoyah de Souza Vigneswaren	25	1.0	−2.1
Majority		291	11.7	−13.2
Turnout		2,478	19.7	+1.9
Liberal Democrats hold		Swing	-6.6	

Horsforth
Party	Candidate	Votes	%	±%
Liberal Democrats	Chris Townsley*	3,321	45.9	+8.8
Conservative	Richard Hardcastle	2,746	37.9	+1.3
Labour	Nigel Gill	563	7.8	−3.9
BNP	Ian Asquith	339	4.7	+0.1
Green	Andrea Binns	272	3.8	−1.1
Majority		575	7.9	+7.5
Turnout		7,241	41.9	+0.6
Liberal Democrats hold		Swing	+3.7	

Hyde Park & Woodhouse
Party	Candidate	Votes	%	±%
Liberal Democrats	Penny Ewens*	1,206	40.6	−3.2
Labour	Gerry Harper	1,142	38.5	+5.8
Green	Kate Bisson	299	10.1	−0.4
Conservative	Syprian Pitkin	219	7.4	+1.1
BNP	Bernard Allen	102	3.4	+0.3
Majority		64	2.2	−8.9
Turnout		2,968	19.9	−1.5
Liberal Democrats hold		Swing	-4.5	

Killingbeck & Seacroft
Party	Candidate	Votes	%	±%
Labour	Graham Hyde*	2,576	49.8	−4.4
Conservative	Donald Townsley	767	14.8	+1.3
BNP	Mark Powell	723	14.0	−2.8
Liberal Democrats	Sadie Fisher	530	10.2	−5.3
UKIP	Adam Douglas	454	8.8	+8.8
Alliance for Green Socialism	Simon Fearn	122	2.4	+2.4
Majority		1,809	35.0	−2.4
Turnout		5,172	31.4	−0.6
Labour hold		Swing	-2.8	

Kippax & Methley
Party	Candidate	Votes	%	±%
Labour	Keith Parker*	3,048	50.6	−5.3
Conservative	Tina Phillips	1,720	28.5	+5.2
BNP	Peter Maverick	751	12.5	+0.1
Liberal Democrats	John MacArthur	506	8.4	−0.1
Majority		1,328	22.0	−10.5
Turnout		6,025	37.8	−1.0
Labour hold		Swing	-5.2	

Kirkstall
Party	Candidate	Votes	%	±%
Labour	Lucinda Yeadon	1,981	39.4	−4.4
Liberal Democrats	Ruth Coleman	1,844	36.6	+2.5
Conservative	Philip Smith	495	9.8	+2.5
BNP	Tony Thackwray	376	7.5	+0.0
Green	Anne-Marie Hill	337	6.7	−0.7
Majority		137	2.7	−6.9
Turnout		5,033	30.1	−1.9
Labour hold		Swing	-3.4	

Middleton Park
Party	Candidate	Votes	%	±%
Labour	Geoff Driver*	1,960	38.3	−8.3
BNP	Kevin Meeson	1,911	37.4	+3.0
Conservative	Alastair Gunn	724	14.2	+5.3
Liberal Democrats	Christine Golton	517	10.1	+0.0
Majority		49	1.0	−11.3
Turnout		5,112	29.4	−2.5
Labour hold		Swing	-5.6	

Moortown
Party	Candidate	Votes	%	±%
Liberal Democrats	Mark Harris*	2,813	41.3	+1.2
Labour	Linda Cullen	1,756	25.8	−5.4
Conservative	Amy Smith	1,597	23.5	+2.5
BNP	Anthony Brown	267	3.9	+0.8
Alliance for Green Socialism	Michael Davies	242	3.6	+0.2
UKIP	Jeff Miles	131	1.9	+0.6
Majority		1,057	15.5	+6.6
Turnout		6,806	39.6	−5.3
Liberal Democrats hold		Swing	+3.3	

Morley North
Party	Candidate	Votes	%	±%
Morley Borough Independent	Robert Finnigan*	3,665	51.7	+10.7
BNP	Tom Redmond	1,388	19.6	+1.8
Labour	Neil Dawson	955	13.5	−0.1
Conservative	Neil Hunt	861	12.1	+3.1
Liberal Democrats	James Jennings	224	3.2	+0.1
Majority		2,277	32.1	+8.8
Turnout		1,388	40.2	−3.1
Morley Borough Independent hold		Swing	+4.4	

Morley South
Party	Candidate	Votes	%	±%
Morley Borough Independent	Judith Elliott*	2,714	43.8	+7.9
BNP	Mike Mee	1,779	28.7	−0.3
Labour	Alec Hudson	832	13.4	−7.4
Conservative	Mark Holmes	517	8.3	+0.2
Liberal Democrats	Nathan Fossey	202	3.3	+0.2
Independent	Charles Slingsby	158	2.5	−0.6
Majority		935	15.1	+8.2
Turnout		6,202	37.7	−4.0
Morley Borough Independent hold		Swing	+4.1	

Otley and Yeadon
Party	Candidate	Votes	%	±%
Liberal Democrats	Graham Kirkland*	2,951	38.8	−5.3
Conservative	Kenneth Creek	2,139	28.2	+5.2
Labour	John Eveleigh	1,716	22.6	−0.8
BNP	Richard Warrington	382	5.0	+0.4
Green	David Webb	232	3.1	−0.3
Alliance for Green Socialism	Francis Denning	177	2.3	+1.5
Majority		812	10.7	−10.1
Turnout		7,597	44.2	−1.4
Liberal Democrats hold		Swing	-5.2	

Pudsey
Party	Candidate	Votes	%	±%
Labour	Josie Jarosz*	2,530	39.0	−2.9
Conservative	Jason Aldiss	2,220	34.2	+1.8
BNP	John Hirst	857	13.2	+1.5
Liberal Democrats	Gregory Hall	580	8.9	+2.2
Green	Irene Dracup	303	4.7	+1.1
Majority		310	4.8	−4.7
Turnout		6,490	37.8	−3.3
Labour hold		Swing	-2.3	

Rothwell
Party	Candidate	Votes	%	±%
Liberal Democrats	Don Wilson*	2,534	43.5	+2.1
Labour	Karen Bruce	1,954	33.6	−3.0
Conservative	Matthew Robinson	706	12.1	+1.3
BNP	Robert Peel	625	10.7	−0.5
Majority		580	10.0	+5.2
Turnout		5,819	37.6	−0.9
Liberal Democrats hold		Swing	+2.5	

Roundhay
Party	Candidate	Votes	%	±%
Conservative	Matthew Lobley*	3,337	47.0	+6.8
Labour	Sharon Hamilton	2,145	30.2	−2.3
Liberal Democrats	Sean Brawley	820	11.5	−1.0
Green	Colin Johnston	294	4.1	−4.0
Alliance for Green Socialism	Malcolm Christie	281	4.0	+1.0
BNP	Mark Ferguson	228	3.2	−0.4
Majority		1,192	16.8	+9.1
Turnout		7,105	41.4	−2.3
Conservative hold		Swing	+4.5	

Temple Newsam
Party	Candidate	Votes	%	±%
Conservative	William Hyde*	2,386	33.9	+1.3
Labour	Jeff Coupar	2,083	29.6	−4.4
BNP	Peter Hollings	1,560	22.2	−1.2
Liberal Democrats	Keith Norman	521	7.4	−2.7
Independent	David Gale	487	6.9	+6.9
Majority		303	4.3	+3.0
Turnout		7,037	44.0	−0.1
Conservative hold		Swing	+2.8	

Weetwood
Party	Candidate	Votes	%	±%
Liberal Democrats	Ben Chastney	2,436	41.3	−6.2
Conservative	Brian Jennings*	1,713	29.0	+4.9
Labour	Rosie Pickard	952	16.1	+2.3
Green	Martin Hemingway	306	5.2	−2.1
BNP	Sharon Knight	302	5.1	+0.6
Alliance for Green Socialism	Trevor Bavage	109	1.8	+0.4
Independent	Alan Procter	67	1.1	+1.1
Independent	Ercan Hayirioglu	18	0.3	+0.3
Majority		723	12.2	−11.2
Turnout		5,903	34.9	−0.3
Liberal Democrats hold		Swing		

Wetherby
Party	Candidate	Votes	%	±%
Conservative	Gerald Wilkinson*	4,208	64.6	+4.3
Labour	Jolene Cassell	1,070	16.4	−2.6
Liberal Democrats	Kate Gagen	631	9.7	−0.5
BNP	David Craven	315	4.8	−0.7
UKIP	Tony Robson	289	4.4	−0.6
Majority		3,138	48.2	+6.9
Turnout		6,513	42.2	−1.1
Conservative hold		Swing	+3.4	

== By-elections between 2008 and 2010 ==
Farnley & Wortley by-election 18 September 2008 replacing Luke Russell (resigned)
Party	Candidate	Votes	%	±%
Green	Andy Parnham	1,183	27.1	−17.5
Liberal Democrats	Rosie Spencer	1,151	26.3	+22.2
Labour	Stephen Towler	1,009	23.1	+1.1
BNP	Peter Hollings	556	12.7	−1.1
Conservative	Glenn Broadbent	428	9.8	−5.2
Alliance for Green Socialism	Michael Davies	45	1.0	+0.5
Majority		32	0.8	−21.7
Turnout		4,372	24.8	−7.7
Green hold		Swing	-19.8	

Temple Newsam by-election 2 April 2009 replacing Jacqueline Langdale (resigned)
Party	Candidate	Votes	%	±%
Conservative	David Schofield	1,785	28.0	−5.9
BNP	Tom Redmond	1,502	23.6	+1.4
Labour	Danny Adilypour	1,476	23.2	−6.4
Liberal Democrats	Ian Dowling	1,468	23.1	+15.6
Green	Christopher Foren	137	2.2	+2.2
Majority		283	4.4	+0.1
Turnout		6,368		
Conservative gain from Labour		Swing	-2.2	

Hyde Park & Woodhouse by-election 18 February 2010 replacing Kabeer Hussain (deceased)
Party	Candidate	Votes	%	±%
Labour	Gerry Harper	1,054	47.8	+9.3
Liberal Democrats	Mike Taylor	671	30.5	−10.1
Conservative	Yasser Khalid	188	8.5	+1.1
Independent	Adele Beeson	150	6.8	+6.8
Green	Christopher Foren	140	6.4	−3.7
Majority		383	17.3	+15.1
Turnout		2,203	14.8	−5.1
Labour gain from Liberal Democrats		Swing	+9.7	
