= 2015 Leeds City Council election =

- 7 May 2015

33 of the 99 seats on Leeds City Council 50 seats needed for a majority
- Turnout: 64.09% (TBC)
	First party	Second party	Third party
Leader	Keith Wakefield	Andrew Carter
Party	Labour	Conservative	Liberal Democrats
Last election	20 seats, 38.6%	6 seats, 21.5%	4 seats, 10.2%
Seats won	22	7	2
Seats after	63	19	9
Seat change	Steady	Steady	Steady
Popular vote	141,856	97,710	29,955
Percentage	39.8%	23.0%	8.4%
	Fourth party	Fifth party	Sixth party
Party	Morley Borough Independents	Green	UKIP
Last election	1 seats, 2.5%	1 seats, 9.1%	0 seats, 16.7%
Seats won	1	1	0
Seats after	5	3	0
Seat change	Steady	Steady	Steady
Popular vote	6,794	31,657	45,953
Percentage	1.9%	8.9%	12.9%
- Labour in red (22), Conservatives in blue (7), Liberal Democrats in yellow (2), Greens in light green (1) and Morley Borough Independents in dark green (1).
Council control before election
Majority administration
Labour
Council control after election
Majority administration
Labour

The 2015 Leeds City Council election took place on Thursday 7 May 2015 to elect members of Leeds City Council in England. It was held on the same day as the 2015 general election and other local elections across the UK.

As per the election cycle, one third of the council's seats were up for election. The councillors subsequently elected replaced those elected when their individual seats were previously contested in 2011.

No political party gained or lost any seats and the Labour Party retained all 22 of their contested council seats and their majority control of the council since 2011.

== Election summary ==
Leeds City Council Election Result 2015
Party	Seats	Gains	Losses	Net gain/loss	Seats %	Votes %	Votes	+/−
Labour	22	0	0	Steady	66.7	39.8	141,856	+1.2
Conservative	7	0	0	Steady	21.2	27.4	97,710	+5.9
UKIP	0	0	0	Steady	0.0	12.9	45,953	-3.8
Green	1	0	0	Steady	3.0	8.9	31,657	-0.2
Liberal Democrats	2	0	0	Steady	6.1	8.4	29,955	-1.8
Morley Borough Independent	1	0	0	Steady	3.0	1.9	6,794	-0.6
TUSC	0	0	0	Steady	0.0	0.4	1,249	+0.1
Alliance for Green Socialism	0	0	0	Steady	0.0	0.3	1,137	-0.3
Monster Raving Loony	0	0	0	Steady	0.0	0.03	104	+0.03
Left Unity	0	0	0	Steady	0.0	0.03	103	+0.03
A Voice for the Region	0	0	0	Steady	0.0	0.02	70	+0.02

This result had the following consequences for the total number of seats on the council after the elections:

Party	2014 election	New council
Labour	63	63
Conservative	18	19 (Note: The Conservatives won Calverley and Farsley ward to regain all three council seats for the ward after Joe Marjoram had previously resigned from the party in July 2013.)
Liberal Democrats	9	9
Morley Borough Independent	5	5
Green	3	3
Independent	1 (Note: Former Conservative councillor Joe Marjoram (Calverley and Farsley) had been an independent since July 2013. He did not stand again for election in 2015.)	0
Total	99	99
Working majority	27	27

== Councillors who did not stand for re-election ==
Councillor/s who did not stand for re-election (5)
Councillor	Ward	First elected	Party	Reason	Successor
Les Carter	Adel & Wharfedale	1973	Conservative	stood down	Caroline Anderson (Conservative)
Ted Hanley	Bramley & Stanningley	2003	Labour	stood down	Julie Heselwood (Labour)
Joe Marjoram	Calverley & Farsley	2008 (as Conservative)	Independent	stood down	Amanda Carter (Conservative)
Katherine Mitchell	Temple Newsam	2011	Labour	stood down	Helen Hayden (Labour)
Vonnie Morgan	Killingbeck & Seacroft	2006	Labour	stood down	Catherine Dobson (Labour)

== Ward results ==
The electoral division results listed below are based on the changes from the 2011 elections, not taking into account any mid-term by-elections or party defections.

Adel & Wharfedale
Party	Candidate	Votes	%	±%
Conservative	Caroline Anderson	5,534	46.1	−4.1
Liberal Democrats	Cheryl Kebede	2,611	21.8	+0.5
Labour	Mark Henley	2,236	18.6	−2.0
UKIP	Malcolm Steele	926	7.7	+3.9
Green	Emma Carter	696	5.8	+1.7
Majority		2,923	24.4	−4.5
Turnout		12,003	75.2	
Conservative hold		Swing	-2.3	

Alwoodley
Party	Candidate	Votes	%	±%
Conservative	Dan Cohen*	6,472	51.4	−1.9
Labour	Keith White	3,907	31.0	−4.4
UKIP	Carl McGuire	943	7.5	+0.6
Liberal Democrats	Simon Dowling	698	5.5	+5.5
Green	Miriam Moss	471	3.7	+3.7
Alliance for Green Socialism	Brian Jackson	97	0.8	−3.6
Majority		2,565	20.4	+2.5
Turnout		12,588	70.3	
Conservative hold		Swing	+1.2	

Ardsley & Robin Hood
Party	Candidate	Votes	%	±%
Labour	Jack Dunn*	4,301	39.5	−9.2
Conservative	Timothy Atkin	3,582	32.9	+9.4
UKIP	David Daniel	2,238	20.5	+13.9
Green	Jude Omidiran	399	3.7	+3.7
Liberal Democrats	Victoria Bishop-Rowe	373	3.4	−2.8
Majority		719	6.6	−18.5
Turnout		10,893	62.3	
Labour hold		Swing	-9.3	

Armley
Party	Candidate	Votes	%	±%
Labour	Jim McKenna*	4,612	48.3	−14.5
UKIP	Dave Caldwell	2,040	21.3	+21.3
Conservative	Shane Morgan	1,314	13.7	−2.9
Green	Nick Crawley	1,108	11.6	−2.7
Liberal Democrats	Christine Glover	381	4.0	−3.0
TUSC	Carole O'Keefe	103	1.1	+1.1
Majority		2,572	26.9	−19.4
Turnout		9,558	54.6	
Labour hold		Swing	-17.9	

Beeston & Holbeck
Party	Candidate	Votes	%	±%
Labour	Adam Ogilvie*	4,335	53.1	−8.2
UKIP	Tony Roberts	1,876	23.0	+13.9
Conservative	Robert Winfield	1,158	14.2	−3.6
Green	Emma Jaynes	480	5.9	−0.7
Liberal Democrats	Kathryn Gagen	200	2.4	−2.8
TUSC	Amy Cousens	119	1.5	+1.5
Majority		2,459	30.1	−13.4
Turnout		8,168	53.7	
Labour hold		Swing	-11.1	

Bramley & Stanningley
Party	Candidate	Votes	%	±%
Labour	Julie Heselwood	4,267	45.8	−15.0
UKIP	Anne Murgatroyd	2,103	22.6	+22.6
Conservative	Alexander Nancolas	1,708	18.3	−1.9
Green	Kate Bisson	791	8.5	−1.5
Liberal Democrats	Serena Glover	389	4.2	−4.8
TUSC	Kevin Pattison	60	0.6	+0.6
Majority		2,164	23.2	−17.3
Turnout		9,318	57.3	
Labour hold		Swing	-18.8	

Burmantofts & Richmond Hill
Party	Candidate	Votes	%	±%
Labour	Asghar Khan*	4,222	53.8	+2.2
UKIP	Geoff Holloran	1,622	20.7	+20.7
Liberal Democrats	David Hollingsworth	737	9.4	−27.1
Conservative	Hayley Nancolas	715	9.1	+4.5
Green	Neil Seepujak	400	5.1	−2.2
TUSC	James Ellis	150	1.9	+1.9
Majority		2,600	33.1	+18.0
Turnout		7,846	50.9	
Labour hold		Swing	-9.3	

Calverley & Farsley
Party	Candidate	Votes	%	±%
Conservative	Amanda Carter	6,005	47.0	−1.1
Labour	John Bracken	4,651	36.4	−6.2
UKIP	Joe Murgatroyd	1,119	8.8	+8.8
Green	Clive Lord	560	4.4	+4.4
Liberal Democrats	Kate Arbuckle	431	3.4	−5.8
Majority		1,354	10.6	+5.1
Turnout		12,766	71.2	
Conservative hold		Swing	+2.6	

Chapel Allerton
Party	Candidate	Votes	%	±%
Labour	Mohammed Rafique*	6,467	58.0	−5.6
Conservative	Farzana Arif	1,692	15.2	+1.8
Green	Mags Shevlin	1,568	14.1	+6.6
Liberal Democrats	Mark Harris	876	7.9	+0.2
Alliance for Green Socialism	Mike Davies	555	5.0	−2.8
Majority		4,775	42.8	−7.4
Turnout		11,158	62.7	
Labour hold		Swing	-3.7	

City & Hunslet
Party	Candidate	Votes	%	±%
Labour	Patrick Davey*	5,292	44.9	−17.8
Green	Ed Carlisle	2,694	22.8	+22.8
Conservative	Richard Salt	2,320	19.6	+2.6
UKIP	Khalil Kungulilo	808	6.9	+6.9
Liberal Democrats	Jahangir Aziz	573	4.9	−15.4
Monster Raving Loony	Christopher Worfolk	104	0.9	+0.9
Majority		2,598	22.0	−20.4
Turnout		11,791	53.9	
Labour hold		Swing	-20.3	

Cross Gates & Whinmoor
Party	Candidate	Votes	%	±%
Labour	Pauleen Grahame*	5,012	45.8	−11.1
Conservative	David Schofield	2,669	24.4	+1.5
UKIP	Darren Oddy	2,363	21.6	+13.7
Green	Ben Goldthorpe	489	4.5	+0.6
Liberal Democrats	Kate Langwick	400	3.7	−0.5
Majority		2,343	21.4	−12.6
Turnout		10,933	61.5	
Labour hold		Swing	-6.3	

Farnley & Wortley
Party	Candidate	Votes	%	±%
Green	Ann Blackburn*	3,851	36.8	−10.6
Labour	John Hardy	3,208	30.6	−6.7
UKIP	Gregory McDougall	1,991	19.0	+19.0
Conservative	Mohammed Rahman	1,156	11.0	−1.2
Liberal Democrats	Robert Jacques	212	2.0	−1.2
TUSC	Maddy Steeds	58	0.6	+0.6
Majority		643	6.1	−4.1
Turnout		10,476	58.7	
Green hold		Swing	-2.0	

Garforth & Swillington
Party	Candidate	Votes	%	±%
Labour	Mark Dobson*	6,737	57.2	−6.9
Conservative	Daniel Farrell	3,137	26.7	−5.7
UKIP	Mark Maniatt	1,297	11.0	+11.0
Green	Lesley Jeffries	327	2.8	+2.8
Liberal Democrats	Mitch Galdas	270	2.3	−1.1
Majority		3,600	30.6	−1.1
Turnout		11,768	72.4	
Labour hold		Swing	-0.6	

Gipton & Harehills
Party	Candidate	Votes	%	±%
Labour	Arif Hussain*	6,187	73.9	−6.3
UKIP	Marvin Kushman	904	10.8	+10.8
Conservative	Joshua Harvey	554	6.6	−1.1
Liberal Democrats	Adam Douglas	413	4.9	−3.5
Green	Peter Phizacklea	319	3.8	+3.8
Majority		5,283	63.1	−8.6
Turnout		8,377	51.5	
Labour hold		Swing	-8.6	

Guiseley & Rawdon
Party	Candidate	Votes	%	±%
Conservative	Paul Wadsworth*	6,268	46.6	+3.8
Labour	Suzie Shepherd	3,678	27.3	−10.0
UKIP	Katherynne Taylor	1,503	11.2	+11.2
Liberal Democrats	Cindy Cleasby	1,206	9.0	−1.2
Green	Benjamin Hall	799	5.9	−1.0
Majority		2,590	19.3	+13.8
Turnout		13,454	73.5	
Conservative hold		Swing	+6.9	

Harewood
Party	Candidate	Votes	%	±%
Conservative	Rachael Procter*	7,103	60.8	+1.3
Labour	Tosin Abbey-Philip	2,035	17.4	+1.8
UKIP	Ian Greenberg	1,289	11.0	−8.8
Liberal Democrats	Christine Golton	638	5.5	+1.3
Green	Janet Heath	624	5.3	+4.3
Majority		5,068	43.4	−2.5
Turnout		11,689	76.7	
Conservative hold		Swing	-0.3	

Headingley
Party	Candidate	Votes	%	±%
Labour	Neil Walshaw*	3,351	40.0	+0.4
Green	Joe Salmon	2,647	31.6	+14.0
Conservative	Diane Fox	1,043	12.4	+2.9
Liberal Democrats	Penny Goodman	1,038	12.4	−15.9
UKIP	Claire Wilson-Sharp	162	1.9	+0.9
TUSC	Iain Dalton	76	0.9	−1.4
A Voice for the Region	Bob Buxton	70	0.8	+0.8
Majority		704	8.4	−2.9
Turnout		8,387	62.7	
Labour hold		Swing	-6.8	

Horsforth
Party	Candidate	Votes	%	±%
Conservative	Dawn Collins*	5,082	40.1	+6.4
Labour	Jake Kelly	3,081	24.3	−3.6
Liberal Democrats	Martin Hughes	2,480	19.5	−11.5
UKIP	Paul Hellyer	1,047	8.3	+3.0
Green	Harriet Regina Barry	873	6.9	+6.9
TUSC	Gary McVeigh-Kaye	125	1.0	−1.1
Majority		2,001	15.8	+13.1
Turnout		12,688	73.1	
Conservative hold		Swing	+5.0	

Hyde Park & Woodhouse
Party	Candidate	Votes	%	±%
Labour	Gerry Harper*	4,344	49.7	−7.7
Green	Christopher Foren	2,298	26.3	+9.4
Conservative	Edward Hardy	1,162	13.3	+4.5
Liberal Democrats	Ellen Hudspith	443	5.1	−11.8
UKIP	Thomas Aitchinson	379	4.3	+4.3
TUSC	Tanis Belsham-Wray	112	1.3	+1.3
Majority		2,046	23.4	−17.0
Turnout		8,738	56.6	
Labour hold		Swing	-8.6	

Killingbeck & Seacroft
Party	Candidate	Votes	%	±%
Labour	Catherine Dobson	4,792	54.8	−18.7
UKIP	Phil Moore	2,061	23.6	+23.6
Conservative	Beatrice Greenwood	1,235	14.1	−2.5
Green	Louise Winrow	350	4.0	+4.0
Liberal Democrats	Joanne Binns	304	3.5	−6.4
Majority		2,731	31.2	−25.8
Turnout		8,742	53.2	
Labour hold		Swing	-21.2	

Kippax & Methley
Party	Candidate	Votes	%	±%
Labour	James Lewis*	5,639	49.5	−13.8
Conservative	Thomas Crosfill	2,878	25.3	+3.6
UKIP	Tina Smith	1,934	17.0	+7.7
Green	Emma Dobson	590	5.2	+5.2
Liberal Democrats	Carmel Harrison	344	3.0	−2.7
Majority		2,761	24.3	−17.2
Turnout		11,385	69.5	
Labour hold		Swing	-8.7	

Kirkstall
Party	Candidate	Votes	%	±%
Labour	John Illingworth*	4,957	51.7	−12.8
Green	Meadow Hudson	1,755	18.3	+8.9
Conservative	Matthew Wharton	1,184	12.3	+0.2
UKIP	Paul Denner	1,017	10.6	+10.6
Liberal Democrats	Johathan Heap	548	5.7	−5.6
TUSC	Dean Meehan	133	1.4	+1.4
Majority		3,202	33.4	−19.0
Turnout		9,594	61.6	
Labour hold		Swing	-10.9	

Middleton Park
Party	Candidate	Votes	%	±%
Labour	Judith Blake*	4,974	51.2	−13.3
UKIP	Craig Sweaton	2,921	30.1	+30.1
Conservative	Zena Lopez	1,199	12.3	−0.9
Green	Fiona Love	280	2.9	+2.9
Liberal Democrats	Sadie Fisher	237	2.4	−2.5
Left Unity	Nick Jones	103	1.1	+1.1
Majority		2,053	21.1	−26.0
Turnout		9,714	51.0	
Labour hold		Swing	-21.7	

Moortown
Party	Candidate	Votes	%	±%
Labour	Rebecca Charlwood*	5,572	44.7	+0.2
Conservative	Mark Dodsworth	3,476	27.9	+11.2
Liberal Democrats	Darren Finlay	1,232	9.9	−24.3
UKIP	Ian Laidlaw	989	7.9	+7.9
Green	Benjamin Hinchliffe	979	7.9	+7.9
Alliance for Green Socialism	Ros Campbell	208	1.7	−2.9
Majority		2,096	16.8	+6.5
Turnout		12,456	70.9	
Labour hold		Swing	-5.5	

Morley North
Party	Candidate	Votes	%	±%
Morley Borough Independent	Bob Gettings*	4,271	37.3	−15.6
Labour	Mark Sewards	2,505	21.9	−1.3
Conservative	Sophie Tempest	2,496	21.8	+9.1
UKIP	Samuel Stead	1,487	13.0	+13.0
Green	Deborah Fenney	354	3.1	+3.1
Liberal Democrats	Peter Andrews	263	2.3	−0.6
TUSC	Karen Cussons	78	0.7	+0.7
Majority		1,766	15.4	−14.3
Turnout		11,454	64.9	
Morley Borough Independent hold		Swing	-7.2	

Morley South
Party	Candidate	Votes	%	±%
Labour	Neil Dawson*	3,071	30.5	−2.9
Morley Borough Independent	Wyn Kidger	2,523	25.0	−7.6
Conservative	Kathleen Ann Tempest	2,096	20.8	+9.2
UKIP	Lindon Dove	1,708	16.9	+16.9
Green	Claire Hawker	370	3.7	+3.7
Liberal Democrats	John Durno MacArthur	203	2.0	−0.8
TUSC	Neil Cussons	107	1.1	+1.1
Majority		548	5.4	+4.6
Turnout		10,078	60.3	
Labour hold		Swing	+2.4	

Otley & Yeadon
Party	Candidate	Votes	%	±%
Liberal Democrats	Colin Campbell*	4,347	35.5	−3.1
Labour	John Eveleigh	3,193	26.1	−10.6
Conservative	John Bale	2,200	18.0	−6.7
UKIP	Tom Hollings	1,396	11.4	+11.4
Green	Mick Bradley	1,098	9.0	+9.0
Majority		1,154	9.4	+7.5
Turnout		12,234	69.5	
Liberal Democrats hold		Swing	+3.8	

Pudsey
Party	Candidate	Votes	%	±%
Labour	Richard Lewis*	4,935	41.6	−11.8
Conservative	Simon Seary	4,266	35.9	+7.0
UKIP	Roger Tattersall	1,613	13.6	+4.3
Green	Claire Allen	629	5.3	+0.6
Liberal Democrats	Jude Arbuckle	354	3.0	−0.8
TUSC	Michael Johnson	72	0.6	+0.6
Majority		669	5.6	−18.9
Turnout		11,869	68.1	
Labour hold		Swing	-9.4	

Rothwell
Party	Candidate	Votes	%	±%
Labour	Karen Bruce*	4,206	38.6	−7.5
Conservative	Steve Ellis	2,715	24.9	+8.7
Liberal Democrats	Ben Ward	2,133	19.6	−18.1
UKIP	Paul Spivey	1,447	13.3	+13.3
Green	Stephen Paul Terry	408	3.7	+3.7
Majority		1,491	13.7	+5.3
Turnout		10,909	68.7	
Labour hold		Swing	-8.1	

Roundhay
Party	Candidate	Votes	%	±%
Labour	Christine MacNiven*	6,178	49.6	−0.7
Conservative	Andy Paraskos	3,506	28.1	−5.2
Green	Paul Ellis	1,021	8.2	+1.5
UKIP	Warren Hendon	773	6.2	+6.2
Liberal Democrats	Najeeb Iqbal	702	5.6	−1.1
Alliance for Green Socialism	Malcolm Christie	277	2.2	−1.0
Majority		2,672	21.4	+4.4
Turnout		12,457	71.5	
Labour hold		Swing	+2.3	

Temple Newsam
Party	Candidate	Votes	%	±%
Labour	Helen Hayden	4,493	42.9	−11.5
Conservative	Elizabeth Hayes	3,059	29.2	−9.6
UKIP	Bruce Naylor	2,097	20.0	+20.0
Liberal Democrats	Keith Norman	420	4.0	−2.8
Green	Nathan Allen	401	3.8	+3.8
Majority		1,434	13.7	−1.8
Turnout		10,470	63.6	
Labour hold		Swing	-1.0	

Weetwood
Party	Candidate	Votes	%	±%
Liberal Democrats	Sue Bentley*	3,790	35.3	−3.8
Labour	Alison Garthwaite	2,901	27.0	−4.1
Conservative	Dorothy Flynn	1,802	16.7	−2.6
Green	Martin Hemingway	1,400	13.0	+4.0
UKIP	Mike Cullen	812	7.5	+7.5
TUSC	Max Cussons	56	0.5	+0.5
Majority		889	8.3	+0.3
Turnout		10,761	68.2	
Liberal Democrats hold		Swing	+0.2	

Wetherby
Party	Candidate	Votes	%	±%
Conservative	Alan Lamb*	6,924	58.4	−1.5
Labour	John Lynch	2,517	21.2	−4.6
UKIP	Bronwen Cole	1,085	9.1	+2.5
Liberal Democrats	Sara Howell	709	6.0	−1.7
Green	Sam Murrey	631	5.3	+5.3
Majority		4,407	37.1	+2.9
Turnout		11,866	75.3	
Conservative hold		Swing	+1.6	
