= Pudsey (ward) =

Electoral ward in Leeds, England

- Pudsey highlighted within Leeds
- Population: 19,116 (2023 electorate)
- Metropolitan borough: City of Leeds
- Metropolitan county: West Yorkshire
- Region: Yorkshire and the Humber
- Country: England
- Sovereign state: United Kingdom
- UK Parliament: Leeds West and Pudsey
- Councillors: Dawn Seary (Conservative); Simon Seary (Conservative); Trish Smith (Note: Elected as Conservative) (Reform UK)

Pudsey is an electoral ward of Leeds City Council in west Leeds, West Yorkshire, including the town of Pudsey and residential areas of Swinnow and Tyersal.

== Councillors ==
Election	Councillor	Councillor	Councillor
Pudsey South (1973 to 2004)
1973	C. Wilson (Lib)	R. Fairbank (Lib)	J. Mann (Lab)
1975	C. Wilson (Lib)	R. Fairbank (Lib)	Peter Kersting (Con)
1976	C. Wilson (Lib)	H. Fairhurst (Con)	Peter Kersting (Con)
1978	Leonard Fletcher (Con)	H. Fairhurst (Con)	Peter Kersting (Con)
1979	Leonard Fletcher (Con)	H. Fairhurst (Con)	Peter Kersting (Con)
1980	Anne Hickinson (Lab)	Donald Brown (Lab)	Peter Kersting (Con)
1982	Anne Hickinson (Lab)	Jonathan Mortimer (Con)	Peter Kersting (Con)
1983	Anne Hickinson (Lab)	Jonathan Mortimer (Con)	Peter Kersting (Con)
TBC	Anne Hickinson (Lab)	Jonathan Mortimer (Con)	Peter Kersting (Ind)
1984	Anne Hickinson (Lab)	Jonathan Mortimer (Con)	Peter Kersting (Ind)
1986	Anne Hickinson (Lab)	Richard Lewis (Lab)	Peter Kersting (Ind)
1987	Anne Hickinson (Lab)	Richard Lewis (Lab)	Peter Kersting (Ind)
1988	Anne Hickinson (Lab)	Richard Lewis (Lab)	Peter Kersting (Ind)
1990	Anne Hickinson (Lab)	Richard Lewis (Lab)	Peter Kersting (Ind)
1991	Anne Hickinson (Lab)	Richard Lewis (Lab)	Peter Kersting (Ind)
1992	Anne Hickinson (Lab)	Richard Lewis (Lab)	Peter Kersting (Ind)
1994	Anne Hickinson (Lab)	Richard Lewis (Lab)	Peter Kersting (Ind)
1995	Josephine Jarosz (Lab)	Richard Lewis (Lab)	Peter Kersting (Ind) (Note: Kersting retired at the 1996 election.)
1996	Josephine Jarosz (Lab)	Richard Lewis (Lab)	Mick Coulson (Lab)
1998	Josephine Jarosz (Lab)	Richard Lewis (Lab)	Mick Coulson (Lab)
1999	Josephine Jarosz (Lab)	Richard Lewis (Lab)	Mick Coulson (Lab)
2000	Josephine Jarosz (Lab)	Richard Lewis (Lab)	Mick Coulson (Lab)
2002	Josephine Jarosz (Lab)	Richard Lewis (Lab)	Mick Coulson (Lab)
2003	Josephine Jarosz (Lab)	Richard Lewis (Lab)	Mick Coulson (Lab)
Pudsey (2004 to present)
2004	Josephine Jarosz (Lab)	Richard Lewis (Lab)	Mick Coulson (Lab)
2006	Josephine Jarosz (Lab)	Richard Lewis (Lab)	Mick Coulson (Lab)
2007	Josephine Jarosz (Lab)	Richard Lewis (Lab)	Mick Coulson (Lab)
2008	Josephine Jarosz (Lab)	Richard Lewis (Lab)	Mick Coulson (Lab)
2010	Josephine Jarosz (Lab)	Richard Lewis (Lab)	Mick Coulson (Lab)
2011	Josephine Jarosz (Lab)	Richard Lewis (Lab)	Mick Coulson (Lab)
2012	Josephine Jarosz (Lab)	Richard Lewis (Lab)	Mick Coulson (Lab)
2014	Josephine Jarosz (Lab)	Richard Lewis (Lab)	Mick Coulson (Lab)
2015	Josephine Jarosz (Lab)	Richard Lewis (Lab)	Mick Coulson (Lab)
2016	Josephine Jarosz (Lab)	Richard Lewis (Lab)	Mick Coulson (Lab)
2018	Simon Seary (Con)	Richard Lewis (Lab)	Mark Harrison (Con)
2019	Simon Seary (Con)	Trish Smith (Con)	Mark Harrison (Con)
2021	Simon Seary (Con)	Trish Smith (Con)	Dawn Seary (Con)
2022	Simon Seary (Con)	Trish Smith (Con)	Dawn Seary (Con)
2023	Simon Seary (Con)	Trish Smith (Con)	Dawn Seary (Con)
2024	Simon Seary (Con)	Trish Smith (Ind) (Note: Smith announced her resignation from the Conservative Party the day following the 2024 election. Smith would form a new Local Independent Party grouping with former Morley Borough Independents councillors Bob Gettings and Wyn Kidger.)	Dawn Seary (Con)
May 2025	Simon Seary (Con)	Trish Smith (RUK) (Note: Smith announced her defection to Reform UK on 10 May 2025, becoming the first councillor to represent the party on Leeds City Council.)	Dawn Seary (Con)
2026	Simon Seary* (Con)	Trish Smith* (RUK)	Dawn Seary (Con)

indicates seat up for re-election. indicates councillor defection. * indicates incumbent councillor.

== Elections since 2010 ==
=== May 2026 ===
2026
Party	Candidate	Votes	%	±%
Conservative	Simon Anthony Seary*	4,415	51.8	▲6.2
Reform	Richard James Robinson	1,531	17.9	▲12.0
Labour	Stephen McBarron	1,304	15.3	▼25.2
Green	Arlan Jones	1,105	13.0	▲7.1
Liberal Democrats	Jennifer Ann Wilson	176	2.1	▼1.2
Turnout			44.9	
Rejected ballots		19		
Registered electors		19,050		
Conservative hold		Swing		

=== May 2024 ===
2024
Party	Candidate	Votes	%	±%
Conservative	Dawn Seary*	3,349	45.6	+1.5
Labour	Riaz Ahmed	2,977	40.5	−1.3
Green	Suzanne Ward	436	5.9	+0.1
Reform	Andrea Whitehead	431	5.9	+3.0
Liberal Democrats	Amy Glover	242	3.3	−1.8
Majority		372	5.1	+2.8
Turnout		7,462	39.2	+3.0
Conservative hold		Swing	+1.4	

=== May 2023 ===
2023
Party	Candidate	Votes	%	±%
Conservative	Trish Smith*	3,050	44.1	−10.9
Labour	Riaz Ahmed	2,891	41.8	+4.6
Green	Alaric Hall	398	5.8	−0.7
Liberal Democrats	Christine Glover	352	5.1	+2.3
Reform	Tom Kelly	201	2.9	N/A
Majority		159	2.3	−15.1
Turnout		6,919	36.2	−3.6
Conservative hold		Swing		

=== May 2022 ===
2022
Party	Candidate	Votes	%	±%
Conservative	Simon Seary*	4,145	55.0	−1.5
Labour	Ryan Holroyd-Case	2,825	37.2	+5.8
Green	Suzanne Ward	386	5.1	0.0
Liberal Democrats	Robert Jacques	210	2.8	−0.2
Majority		1,320	17.4	−7.6
Turnout		7,598	39.8	−2.8
Conservative hold		Swing		

=== May 2021 ===
2021
Party	Candidate	Votes	%	±%
Conservative	Dawn Seary	4,609	56.5	+15.1
Labour	Mark Sewards	2,567	31.4	−6.2
Green	Suzanne Ward	419	5.1	−2.1
Yorkshire	Dan Woodlock	265	3.2	N/A
Liberal Democrats	Cynthia Dowling	248	3.0	−0.8
SDP	Daniel Walker	15	0.2	+0.2
Majority		2,042	25.0	+21.2
Turnout		8,164	42.6	+8.1
Conservative hold		Swing		

=== May 2019 ===
2019
Party	Candidate	Votes	%	±%
Conservative	Trish Smith	2,661	41.4	−1.3
Labour	Richard Lewis*	2,417	37.6	−0.6
UKIP	Lee Stuart Jackson	569	8.8	+8.8
Green	Catherine Harrison	462	7.2	+0.2
Liberal Democrats	Jude Arbuckle	244	3.8	−2.1
For Britain	Lorraine Ida Nellis	82	1.3	+1.3
Majority		244	3.8	−2.1
Turnout		6,455	34.5	−3.7
Conservative gain from Labour		Swing	-0.4	

=== May 2018 ===
2018
Party	Candidate	Votes	%	±%
Conservative	Simon Seary	3,324	42.7	+9.4
Conservative	Mark Harrison	3,099		
Labour	Richard Lewis*	2,976	38.2	−7.2
Conservative	Mark Neve	2,901		
Labour	Mick Coulson*	2,731		
Labour	Lou Cunningham	2,698		
Yorkshire	Conor O'Neill	570	7.3	+4.0
Green	Helen Hart	545	7.0	+3.5
Liberal Democrats	Christine Glover	460	5.9	+3.3
Liberal Democrats	Martin Hughes	190		
Liberal Democrats	Jude Arbuckle	247		
Majority		423	5.9	−6.4
Turnout		7,194	38.2	+1.3
Conservative gain from Labour		Swing		
Conservative gain from Labour		Swing		
Labour hold		Swing		

=== May 2016 ===
2016
Party	Candidate	Votes	%	±%
Labour Co-op	Josie Jarosz*	2,884	45.4	+3.8
Conservative	Simon Seary	2,120	33.3	−2.6
UKIP	Kath Tattersall	751	11.8	−1.8
Green	Laura Rosemary Johnson	220	3.5	−1.8
Yorkshire First	Conor Andrew O'Neill	211	3.3	+3.3
Liberal Democrats	Jude Patrick Arbuckle	167	2.6	−0.4
Majority		764	12.3	+6.7
Turnout		6,353	36.9	
Labour hold		Swing		

=== May 2015 ===
2015
Party	Candidate	Votes	%	±%
Labour	Richard Lewis*	4,935	41.6	−11.8
Conservative	Simon Seary	4,266	35.9	+7.0
UKIP	Roger Tattersall	1,613	13.6	+4.3
Green	Claire Allen	629	5.3	+0.6
Liberal Democrats	Jude Arbuckle	354	3.0	−0.8
TUSC	Michael Johnson	72	0.6	+0.6
Majority		669	5.6	−18.9
Turnout		11,869	68.1	
Labour hold		Swing	-9.4	

=== May 2014 ===
2014
Party	Candidate	Votes	%	±%
Labour	Mick Coulson*	2,182		
UKIP	Phil Banks	1,785		
Conservative	Amanda Carter	1,356		
Green	Irene Dracup	390		
Liberal Democrats	Jude Arbuckle	205		
Majority				
Turnout			35.4	
Labour hold		Swing		

=== May 2012 ===
2012
Party	Candidate	Votes	%	±%
Labour Co-op	Josie Jarosz*	3,312	59.2	+5.9
Conservative	Jason Aldiss	1,147	20.5	−8.4
UKIP	Paul Denner	811	14.5	+5.3
Liberal Democrats	Jude Arbuckle	320	5.7	+1.9
Majority		2,165	38.7	+14.2
Turnout		5,590		
Labour hold		Swing	+7.1	

=== May 2011 ===
2011
Party	Candidate	Votes	%	±%
Labour Co-op	Richard Lewis*	3,669	53.4	+11.1
Conservative	Jason Aldiss	1,987	28.9	−0.3
UKIP	Phil Banks	636	9.3	+9.3
Green	Irene Dracup	321	4.7	+2.1
Liberal Democrats	Brendan Stubbs	262	3.8	−14.3
Majority		1,682	24.5	+11.4
Turnout		6,875	40	
Labour hold		Swing	+5.7	

=== May 2010 ===
2010
Party	Candidate	Votes	%	±%
Labour	Mick Coulson*	4,861	42.3	+3.3
Conservative	Jason Aldiss	3,356	29.2	−5.0
Liberal Democrats	Brendan Stubbs	2,081	18.1	+9.2
BNP	Winifred Misson	901	7.8	−5.4
Green	Irene Dracup	292	2.5	−2.1
Majority		1,505	13.1	+8.3
Turnout		11,491	66.6	+28.8
Labour hold		Swing	+4.1	

== See also ==
- Listed buildings in Pudsey
