= Guiseley and Rawdon =

Electoral ward in Leeds, England

- Guiseley and Rawdon highlighted within Leeds
- Population: 18,611 (2023 electorate)
- Metropolitan borough: City of Leeds
- Metropolitan county: West Yorkshire
- Region: Yorkshire and the Humber
- Country: England
- Sovereign state: United Kingdom
- UK Parliament: Leeds North West
- Councillors: Sonia Leighton (Labour); Oliver Edwards (Labour); Eleanor Thomson (Labour)

Guiseley and Rawdon is an electoral ward of Leeds City Council to the north west of Leeds, West Yorkshire, covering the town of Guiseley, the majority of the village of Rawdon, the southern part of the town of Yeadon, and the part of Menston within the City of Leeds.

== Councillors ==
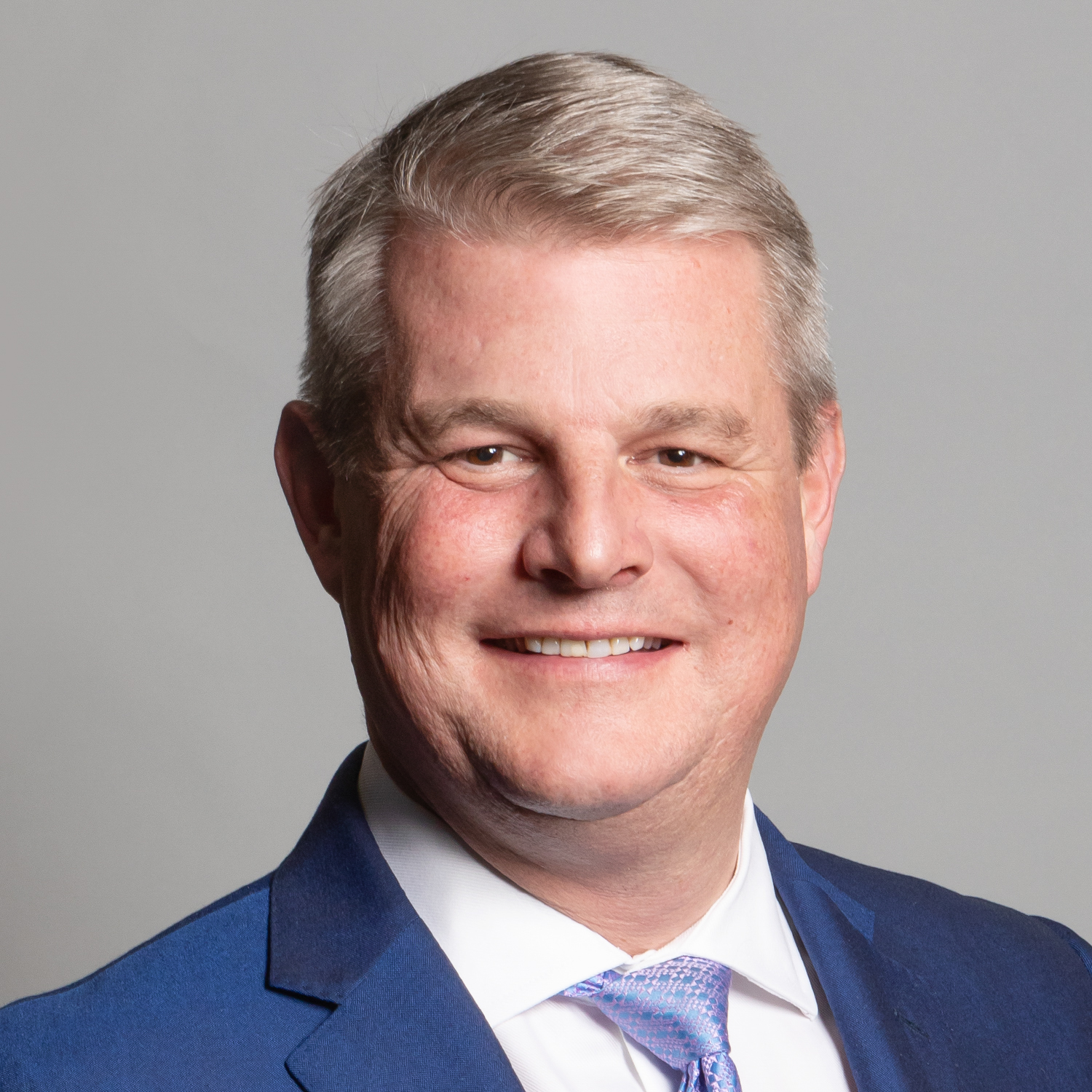
Stuart Andrew represented Aireborough ward (2003-2004) and Guiseley and Rawdon ward (2004-2010). Member of Parliament for Pudsey since 2010.

| Election | Councillor | Councillor | Councillor |
Aireborough (1973 to 2004)
| 1973 | W. Hudson (Con) | H. Freeman (Con) | R. Cartwright (Con) |
| 1975 | W. Hudson (Con) | J. Hutchinson (Con) | R. Cartwright (Con) |
| 1976 | W. Hudson (Con) | J. Hutchinson (Con) | R. Cartwright (Con) |
| 1978 | W. Hudson (Con) | J. Hutchinson (Con) | R. Cartwright (Con) |
| 1979 | W. Hudson (Con) | J. Hutchinson (Con) | H. Freeman (Con) |
| 1980 | W. Hudson (Con) | Hugh Barber (Con) | T. Hawkins (Con) |
| 1982 | W. Hudson (Con) | Hugh Barber (Con) | T. Hawkins (Con) |
| 1983 | W. Hudson (Con) | Hugh Barber (Con) | T. Hawkins (Con) |
| 1984 | W. Hudson (Con) | Hugh Barber (Con) | T. Hawkins (Con) |
| 1986 | W. Hudson (Con) | Hugh Barber (Con) | J.D. Atkinson (Con) |
| 1986 by-election | W. Hudson (Con) | Janet Brown (Lib) | J.D. Atkinson (Con) |
| 1987 | W. Hudson (Con) | Janet Brown (Lib) | J.D. Atkinson (Con) |
| 1988 | Richard Rowland-Hughes (Con) | Janet Brown (Lib) | J.D. Atkinson (Con) |
| 1990 | Richard Rowland-Hughes (Con) | Janet Brown (Lib) | Moira Dunn (Lab) |
| 1991 | Richard Rowland-Hughes (Con) | Margaret Atkinson (Con) | Moira Dunn (Lab) |
| 1992 | Richard Rowland-Hughes (Con) | Margaret Atkinson (Con) | Moira Dunn (Lab) |
| 1994 | Richard Rowland-Hughes (Con) | Margaret Atkinson (Con) | Moira Dunn (Lab) |
| 1995 | Richard Rowland-Hughes (Con) | Michael Dunn (Lab) | Moira Dunn (Lab) |
| 1996 | Tony Addison (Lab) | Michael Dunn (Lab) | Moira Dunn (Lab) |
| 1998 | Tony Addison (Lab) | Michael Dunn (Lab) | Moira Dunn (Lab) |
| 1999 | Tony Addison (Lab) | Michael Dunn (Lab) | Moira Dunn (Lab) |
| 2000 | Graham Latty (Con) | Michael Dunn (Lab) | Moira Dunn (Lab) |
| 2002 | Graham Latty (Con) | Michael Dunn (Lab) | Makhan Thakur (Con) |
| 2003 | Graham Latty (Con) | Stuart Andrew (Con) | Makhan Thakur (Con) |
Guiseley and Rawdon (2004 to present)
| 2004 | Graham Latty (Con) | Stuart Andrew (Con) | John Bale (Con) |
| 2006 | Graham Latty (Con) | Stuart Andrew (Con) | John Bale (Con) |
| 2007 | Graham Latty (Con) | Stuart Andrew (Con) | John Bale (Con) |
| 2008 | Graham Latty (Con) | Stuart Andrew (Con) | John Bale (Con) |
| 2010 | Graham Latty (Con) | Stuart Andrew (Con) (Note: Andrew was also elected as Member of Parliament for the Pudsey constituency on the same day as the 2010 council election, resulting in him later resigning his council seat and a by-election was called for 14 October.) | Pat Latty (Con) |
| 2010 by-election | Graham Latty (Con) | Paul Wadsworth (Con) (Note: Wadsworth had previously been a Roundhay ward councillor from 2004 until he lost his seat in May 2010.) | Pat Latty (Con) |
| 2011 | Graham Latty (Con) | Paul Wadsworth (Con) | Pat Latty (Con) |
| 2012 | Graham Latty (Con) | Paul Wadsworth (Con) | Pat Latty (Con) |
| 2014 | Graham Latty (Con) | Paul Wadsworth (Con) | Pat Latty (Con) |
| 2015 | Graham Latty (Con) | Paul Wadsworth (Con) | Pat Latty (Con) |
| 2016 | Graham Latty (Con) | Paul Wadsworth (Con) | Pat Latty (Con) |
| 2018 | Graham Latty (Con) | Paul Wadsworth (Con) | Pat Latty (Con) |
| 2019 | Graham Latty (Con) | Paul Wadsworth (Con) | Pat Latty (Con) |
| 2021 | Graham Latty (Con) | Paul Wadsworth (Con) | Paul Alderson (Con) |
| 2022 | Eleanor Thomson (Lab) | Paul Wadsworth (Con) | Paul Alderson (Con) |
| 2023 | Eleanor Thomson (Lab) | Oliver Edwards (Lab) | Paul Alderson (Con) |
| 2024 | Eleanor Thomson (Lab) | Oliver Edwards (Lab) | Sonia Leighton (Lab) |
| 2026 | Eleanor Thomson* (Lab) | Oliver Edwards* (Lab) | Sonia Leighton* (Lab) |

indicates seat up for re-election. indicates seat up for election following resignation or death of sitting councillor. * indicates incumbent councillor.

== Elections since 2010 ==
=== May 2026 ===
2026
| Party | Candidate | Votes | % | ±% |
|---|---|---|---|---|
| Labour Co-op | Eleanor Frances Thomson* | 3,469 | 37.6 | ▼9.0 |
| Conservative | Paul James Alderson | 2,407 | 26.1 | ▼9.9 |
| Reform | Robert Andrew Harder | 1,813 | 19.7 | New |
| Green | Eliza Ainley | 918 | 10.0 | ▲5.3 |
| Yorkshire | Bob Buxton | 316 | 3.4 | ▼5.3 |
| Liberal Democrats | Helen Louise Page | 279 | 3.0 | ▼1.1 |
| Majority | | 1062 | 11.5 | ▲0.9 |
| Turnout | | 9,202 | 50.3 | ▲7.9 |
| Rejected ballots | | 16 | 0.2 | |
| Registered electors | | 18,334 | | |
| Labour Co-op hold | | Swing | ▲0.4 | |

=== May 2024 ===
2024
| Party | Candidate | Votes | % | ±% |
|---|---|---|---|---|
| Labour Co-op | Sonia Leighton | 3,604 | 46.6 | −0.2 |
| Conservative | Paul Alderson* | 2,782 | 36.0 | −1.3 |
| Yorkshire | Bob Buxton | 672 | 8.7 | +1.2 |
| Green | Lucy Wheeler | 363 | 4.7 | +0.3 |
| Liberal Democrats | Helen Page | 316 | 4.1 | +0.4 |
| Majority | | 822 | 10.6 | +1.1 |
| Turnout | | 3,639 | 42.4 | +0.2 |
| Labour Co-op gain from Conservative | | Swing | +0.6 | |

=== May 2023 ===
2023
| Party | Candidate | Votes | % | ±% |
|---|---|---|---|---|
| Labour Co-op | Oliver Edwards | 3,678 | 46.8 | −1.0 |
| Conservative | Paul Wadsworth* | 2,934 | 37.3 | +0.8 |
| Yorkshire | Bob Buxton | 591 | 7.5 | −1.0 |
| Green | Lucy Wheeler | 345 | 4.4 | +0.9 |
| Liberal Democrats | Robert Jacques | 293 | 3.7 | +0.3 |
| Majority | | 744 | 9.5 | −1.8 |
| Turnout | | 7,857 | 42.2 | −2.3 |
| Labour gain from Conservative | | Swing | | |

=== May 2022 ===
2022
| Party | Candidate | Votes | % | ±% |
|---|---|---|---|---|
| Labour | Eleanor Thomson | 3,957 | 47.8 | +11.9 |
| Conservative | Pete Gable | 3,024 | 36.5 | −9.1 |
| Yorkshire | Bob Buxton | 703 | 8.5 | −0.9 |
| Green | Richard Firth | 290 | 3.5 | −1.6 |
| Liberal Democrats | Stuart McLeod | 278 | 3.4 | +0.3 |
| Majority | | 933 | 11.3 | +1.6 |
| Turnout | | 8,281 | 44.5 | −3.2 |
| Labour gain from Conservative | | Swing | | |

=== May 2021 ===
2021
| Party | Candidate | Votes | % | ±% |
|---|---|---|---|---|
| Conservative | Paul Alderson | 4,069 | 45.6 | +5.0 |
| Labour Co-op | Eleanor Thomson | 3,200 | 35.9 | +9.8 |
| Yorkshire | Bob Buxton | 840 | 9.4 | −2.5 |
| Green | Nick Hodgkinson | 458 | 5.1 | −5.6 |
| Liberal Democrats | Stuart Mcleod | 274 | 3.1 | −2.4 |
| For Britain | Tom Hollings | 47 | 0.1 | N/A |
| Majority | | 869 | 9.7 | −4.8 |
| Turnout | | 8,925 | 47.7 | +9.5 |
| Conservative hold | | Swing | | |

=== May 2019 ===
2019
| Party | Candidate | Votes | % | ±% |
|---|---|---|---|---|
| Conservative | Paul Wadsworth* | 2,836 | 40.6 | +2.2 |
| Labour Co-op | Eleanor Thomson | 1,825 | 26.1 | −1.8 |
| Yorkshire | Bob Buxton | 899 | 12.9 | −2.9 |
| Green | Mark Rollinson | 746 | 10.7 | −3.0 |
| Liberal Democrats | Christine Glover | 386 | 5.5 | +1.4 |
| Independent | Roger Tattersall | 299 | 4.3 | +4.3 |
| Majority | | 1,011 | 14.5 | +4.0 |
| Turnout | | 7,033 | 38.2 | −4.1 |
| Conservative hold | | Swing | +2.0 | |

=== May 2018 ===
2018
| Party | Candidate | Votes | % | ±% |
|---|---|---|---|---|
| Conservative | Graham Latty* | 3,714 | 38.4 | −5.6 |
| Conservative | Pat Latty* | 3,483 | | |
| Conservative | Paul Wadsworth* | 3,286 | | |
| Labour Co-op | Kirsty McKay | 2,693 | 27.9 | −1.4 |
| Labour Co-op | Andrew Thomson | 2,597 | | |
| Labour Co-op | Ian McCargo | 2,395 | | |
| Yorkshire | Bob Buxton | 1,530 | 15.8 | +5.5 |
| Green Party - Save Our Green Space | Mark Rollinson | 1,326 | 13.7 | +10.2 |
| Liberal Democrats | Cynthia Dowling | 401 | 4.1 | −1.0 |
| Liberal Democrats | Michael Edwards | 396 | | |
| Liberal Democrats | Katherine Bavage | 350 | | |
| Majority | | 1,021 | 10.5 | −4.2 |
| Turnout | | 18,495 | 42.3 | +2.1 |
| Conservative hold | | Swing | | |
| Conservative hold | | Swing | | |
| Conservative hold | | Swing | | |

=== May 2016 ===
2016
| Party | Candidate | Votes | % | ±% |
|---|---|---|---|---|
| Conservative | Graham Latty* | 3,177 | 44.0 | −2.6 |
| Labour | David Robert Bowe | 2,114 | 29.3 | −2.0 |
| Yorkshire First | Bob Buxton | 741 | 10.3 | +10.3 |
| UKIP | Lynn Christine Parker | 571 | 7.9 | 3.3 |
| Liberal Democrats | Simon Mark Dowling | 367 | 5.1 | −3.9 |
| Green | Lesley Jeffries | 255 | 3.5 | −2.4 |
| Majority | | 1,063 | 14.7 | −4.6 |
| Turnout | | 7,225 | 40.2 | |
| Conservative hold | | Swing | | |

=== May 2015 ===
2015
| Party | Candidate | Votes | % | ±% |
|---|---|---|---|---|
| Conservative | Paul Wadsworth* | 6,268 | 46.6 | +3.8 |
| Labour | Suzie Shepherd | 3,678 | 27.3 | −10.0 |
| UKIP | Katherynne Taylor | 1,503 | 11.2 | +11.2 |
| Liberal Democrats | Cindy Cleasby | 1,206 | 9.0 | −1.2 |
| Green | Benjamin Hall | 799 | 5.9 | −1.0 |
| Majority | | 2,590 | 19.3 | +13.8 |
| Turnout | | 13,454 | 73.5 | |
| Conservative hold | | Swing | +6.9 | |

=== May 2014 ===
2014
| Party | Candidate | Votes | % | ±% |
|---|---|---|---|---|
| Conservative | Pat Latty* | 2,811 | 39.8 | |
| Labour | David Bowe | 1,871 | 26.5 | |
| UKIP | Roger Tattersall | 1,444 | 20.5 | |
| Green | Colin Avison | 541 | 7.7 | |
| Liberal Democrats | Cindy Cleasby | 389 | 5.5 | |
| Majority | | 940 | | |
| Turnout | | 7056 | 38.65 | |
| Conservative hold | | Swing | | |

=== May 2012 ===
2012
| Party | Candidate | Votes | % | ±% |
|---|---|---|---|---|
| Conservative | Graham Latty* | 2,750 | 43.7 | +0.9 |
| Labour | Mike King | 2,526 | 40.1 | +2.8 |
| Green | Colin Avison | 621 | 9.9 | +3.0 |
| Liberal Democrats | Robert Jacques | 397 | 6.3 | −3.9 |
| Majority | | 224 | 3.6 | −1.9 |
| Turnout | | 6,294 | | |
| Conservative hold | | Swing | -0.9 | |

=== May 2011 ===
2011
| Party | Candidate | Votes | % | ±% |
|---|---|---|---|---|
| Conservative | Paul Wadsworth* | 3,276 | 42.8 | +2.6 |
| Labour | Mike King | 2,853 | 37.3 | +9.1 |
| Liberal Democrats | Cindy Cleasby | 778 | 10.2 | −12.9 |
| Green | Colin Avison | 529 | 6.9 | +3.5 |
| BNP | Andrew Gallagher | 213 | 2.8 | −2.3 |
| Majority | | 423 | 5.5 | −6.5 |
| Turnout | | 7,649 | 44 | |
| Conservative hold | | Swing | -3.2 | |

=== October 2010 by-election ===
14 October 2010 replacing Stuart Andrew (resigned)
| Party | Candidate | Votes | % | ±% |
|---|---|---|---|---|
| Conservative | Paul Wadsworth | 2,075 | 45.1 | +4.9 |
| Labour | Mike King | 1,708 | 37.1 | +8.9 |
| Liberal Democrats | Cindy Cleasby | 818 | 17.8 | −5.3 |
| Majority | | 367 | 8.0 | −4.0 |
| Turnout | | 4,601 | 25.0 | −47.4 |
| Conservative hold | | Swing | -2.0 | |

=== May 2010 ===
2010
| Party | Candidate | Votes | % | ±% |
|---|---|---|---|---|
| Conservative | Pat Latty | 5,090 | 40.2 | −10.6 |
| Labour | Mike King | 3,574 | 28.2 | +3.7 |
| Liberal Democrats | Cindy Cleasby | 2,921 | 23.1 | +10.8 |
| BNP | Andrew Gallagher | 647 | 5.1 | −1.3 |
| Green | Colin Avison | 432 | 3.4 | −1.7 |
| Majority | | 1,516 | 12.0 | −14.4 |
| Turnout | | 12,664 | 72.4 | +32.1 |
| Conservative hold | | Swing | -7.1 | |

== See also ==
- Listed buildings in Guiseley and Rawdon
