= 2021 Leeds City Council election =

- 6 May 2021

34 of the 99 seats on Leeds City Council 50 seats needed for a majority
- Turnout: 37.67 (▲6.67%)
	First party	Second party	Third party
Leader	James Lewis	Andrew Carter
Party	Labour	Conservative	Liberal Democrats
Last election	19 seats, 38.4%	7 seats, 28.2%	3 seats, 11.7%
Seats before	54	23	7 (Note: Rothwell ward councillor, Carmel Hall, died in office in July 2020. In accordance with UK government regulations in response to COVID-19, no by-election was called as all local government by-elections were postponed to take place on the same date as the 2021 council election, when Hall's council term was due to expire.)
Seats won	19	9	2
Seats after	54	24	8
Seat change	▼2	▲1	Steady
Popular vote	94,391	70,798	19,350
Percentage	42.4%	31.8%	8.7%
Swing	▲4.0pp	▲3.6pp	▼3.0pp
	Fourth party	Fifth party	Sixth party
Party	Morley Borough Independents	Green	Garforth and Swillington Independents
Last election	2 seats, 3.3%	1 seats, 11.6%	1 seat, 2.3%
Seats before	5	3	3
Seats won	2	1	1
Seats after	6	3	3
Seat change	▲1	Steady	Steady
Popular vote	5,049	20,473	3,740
Percentage	2.3%	9.2%	1.7%
Swing	▼1.0pp	▼2.4pp	▼0.6pp
- Map showing the results of the 2021 Leeds City Council election
council control before election
Majority administration
Labour
Council control after election
Majority administration
Labour

The 2021 Leeds City Council election took place on Thursday 6 May 2021 to elect members of Leeds City Council in England. It was held on the same day as other local elections across England and the rest of the UK, including the inaugural West Yorkshire mayoral election.

The election was originally scheduled for 7 May 2020, alongside the later cancelled 2020 West Yorkshire Police and Crime Commissioner election and other local elections across the UK, but was delayed for a year due to the COVID-19 pandemic.

As per the election cycle, both one third of the council's 99 seats and an additional casual vacancy in Roundhay ward were contested. Following the postponement of the original election in 2020, the incumbent councillors' terms have been extended for an additional year to their initial two-year term granted in 2018. All councillors elected in 2021 will serve a one-off three-year term, instead of the usual four-year term, to retain their original term end date of 2024.

The Labour Party maintained their majority control of the council despite losing two seats. The closest contest saw Labour hold Temple Newsam ward by 12 votes ahead of the Conservatives.

== Election summary ==
Leeds City Council Election Result 2021
Party	Candidates						Votes		
Party	Stood	Elected	Gained	Unseated	Net	% of total	%	No.	Net %
Labour	34	19	0	2	▼2	55.9	42.4	94,391	+4.0
Conservative	34	9	1	0	▲1	26.5	31.8	70,798	+3.6
Green	32	1	0	0	Steady	2.9	9.2	20,473	-2.4
Liberal Democrats	34	2	0	0	Steady	5.9	8.7	19,350	-3.0
Morley Borough Independent	2	2	1	0	▲1	5.9	2.3	5,049	-1.0
Garforth and Swillington Independents	1	1	0	0	Steady	2.9	1.7	3,740	-0.6
SDP	17	0	0	0	Steady	0.0	1.3	2,791	+0.6
Yorkshire	8	0	0	0	Steady	0.0	1.2	2,729	+0.6
Independent	3	0	0	0	Steady	0.0	0.4	870	-0.2
Alliance for Green Socialism	3	0	0	0	Steady	0.0	0.3	742	+0.1
Save Our Beeston and Holbeck Independents	1	0	0	0	Steady	0.0	0.3	611	-0.3
TUSC	7	0	0	0	Steady	0.0	0.2	527	New
Freedom Alliance. No Lockdowns. No Curfews.	3	0	0	0	Steady	0.0	0.1	225	New
Women's Equality	1	0	0	0	Steady	0.0	0.1	174	-0.3
UKIP	1	0	0	0	Steady	0.0	0.1	157	-4.7
Reform	1	0	0	0	Steady	0.0	0.1	116	New
For Britain	1	0	0	0	Steady	0.0	0.0	47	-1.0
Total	183	34	2	2	Steady	100.0	100.0	222,647	▲50,061

The election result had the following consequences for the political composition of the council:

Party	2019 election	Prior to election	New council
Labour	57	54	54
Conservative	23	23	24
Liberal Democrat	8	7	8
Morley Borough Independents	5	5	6
Garforth and Swillington Independents	3	3	3
Green	3	3	3
Independent	0	1 (Note: Ronald Grahame (Burmantofts and Richmond Hill, Labour) was charged with historic child sex offences in late 2020 and is currently "suspended from the Labour Party pending the outcome of the case.")	1
Vacant	0	3 (Note: In addition to the vacancy created following the death of Carmel Hall, both Eleanor Tunnicliffe and Angela Wenham resigned from their offices "over the weekend" of 20 and 21 March 2021. Tunnicliffe's term was due to expire in 2022, whereas Wenham resigned prior to the expiry of her term on 6 May 2021. In October 2019, Wenham had been de-selected by her Constituency Labour Party and therefore unable to recontest her seat as the Labour candidate. Two replacement councillors will be elected on 6 May.)	0
Total	99	99	99
Working majority	15	12	9

== Councillors who did not stand for re-election ==
Councillor/s who did not stand for re-election (9)
Councillor	Ward	First elected	Party	Reason	Successor
Judith Blake	Middleton Park	1996, 2002	Labour	stood down	Sharon Burke (Labour)
Neil Dawson	Morley South	2011	Labour	stood down	Jane Senior (Morley Borough Independents)
Peter Gruen	Cross Gates & Whinmoor	1983 (as Conservative), 1997 (as Labour)	Labour	stood down	James Gibson (Labour)
Carmel Hall	Rothwell	2018	Liberal Democrats	died in office	Conrad Hart-Brooke (Liberal Democrats)
Mark Harrison	Pudsey	2018	Conservative	stood down	Dawn Seary (Conservative)
Christine Knight	Weetwood	2018	Labour	stood down	Emma Flint (Labour)
Pat Latty	Guiseley & Rawdon	2010	Conservative	stood down	Paul Alderson (Conservative)
Eleanor Tunnicliffe	Roundhay	2016	Labour	resigned office	Zara Hussain (Labour)
Angela Wenham	Roundhay	2018	Labour	deselected, later resigned office	Lisa Martin (Labour)

== Ward results ==
=== Adel & Wharfedale ===
Adel & Wharfedale
Party	Candidate	Votes	%	±%
Conservative	Caroline Anderson*	4,527	55.6	+9.0
Labour	Chris Bridges	1,975	24.3	+4.8
Liberal Democrats	Michael White	1,022	12.5	−5.8
Green	Lesley Jeffries	566	6.9	−0.9
Majority		2,552	31.3	+4.2
Turnout		8,144	50.0	+9.1
Conservative hold		Swing	+2.1	

=== Alwoodley ===
Alwoodley
Party	Candidate	Votes	%	±%
Conservative	Neil Buckley*	4,481	57.5	+2.7
Labour	Amy Hegan	2,370	30.4	+3.7
Liberal Democrats	Roderic Parker	328	4.2	−5.0
Yorkshire	Graham Dews	245	3.1	N/A
Women's Equality	Louise Jennings	174	2.2	−0.8
Alliance for Green Socialism	Brian Jackson	152	2.0	+1.0
Majority		2,111	27.1	−1.0
Turnout		7,794	44.3	+8.3
Conservative hold		Swing	-0.5	

=== Ardsley & Robin Hood ===
Ardsley & Robin Hood
Party	Candidate	Votes	%	±%
Conservative	Mike Foster	3,006	47.0	+21.6
Labour Co-op	Ben Garner*	2,639	41.3	+5.6
Green	Colin Noble	372	5.8	+0.7
Liberal Democrats	Benjamin Ward	260	4.1	−0.5
SDP	David Creasser	71	1.1	+0.5
Majority		367	5.7	−4.6
Turnout		6,396	36.0	+7.9
Conservative gain from Labour Co-op		Swing	+8.0	

=== Armley ===
Armley
Party	Candidate	Votes	%	±%
Labour	Jim McKenna*	2,858	56.3	−4.4
Conservative	Tamas Kovacs	1,026	20.2	+10.0
Green	Mark Rollinson	815	16.1	+2.8
Liberal Democrats	Dan Walker	211	4.2	−1.3
TUSC	Richard Chaves-Sanderson	83	1.6	N/A
SDP	Andrew Martin	43	0.1	N/A
Majority		1,832	36.1	−11.3
Turnout		5,074	29.3	+4.4
Labour hold		Swing	-7.2	

=== Beeston & Holbeck ===
Beeston & Holbeck
Party	Candidate	Votes	%	±%
Labour	Gohar Almass*	2,777	52.8	+5.3
Conservative	Andrew Martin	996	18.9	+11.3
Green	Becky Kellett	748	14.2	+7.1
Save Our Beeston and Holbeck Independents	Francesca Robinson	468	8.8	−16.4
Liberal Democrats	Robert Jaques	117	2.2	−2.2
Freedom Alliance. No Lockdowns. No Curfews.	Bill Palfreman	82	1.6	N/A
TUSC	Jay Slayton-Joslin	34	0.6	N/A
Majority		1,781	33.9	+11.6
Turnout		5,260	29.4	+4.2
Labour hold		Swing	-3.0	

=== Bramley & Stanningley ===
Bramley & Stanningley
Party	Candidate	Votes	%	±%
Labour	Caroline Gruen*	2,779	52.9	+4.3
Conservative	Adam Cook	1,342	25.5	+15.1
Liberal Democrats	Liz Bee	571	10.9	+1.2
Green	Clive Lord	461	8.8	+0.0
SDP	Daniel Whetstone	40	0.8	N/A
Majority		1,437	27.3	−6.8
Turnout		5,255	30.5	+6.6
Labour hold		Swing	-5.9	

=== Burmantofts & Richmond Hill ===
Burmantofts & Richmond Hill
Party	Candidate	Votes	%	±%
Labour	Asghar Khan*	2,984	60.4	+3.9
Conservative	Dawn Payne	619	12.5	+6.7
Independent	Geoff Holloran	554	11.2	−8.6
Liberal Democrats	David Hollingsworth	378	7.7	−3.1
Green	Karen Peters	361	7.3	+0.1
Majority		2,365	47.9	+11.2
Turnout		4,937	29.0	+6.2
Labour hold		Swing	-1.4	

=== Calverley & Farsley ===
Calverley & Farsley
Party	Candidate	Votes	%	±%
Conservative	Amanda Carter*	4,424	53.6	+10.5
Labour	Naheem Alam	2,808	34.0	−9.5
Green	Ellen Graham	664	8.0	−1.7
Liberal Democrats	Ian Dowling	312	3.7	+0.1
Majority		1,616	19.6	+19.2
Turnout		8,254	44.4	+7.5
Conservative hold		Swing	+10.0	

=== Chapel Allerton ===
Chapel Allerton
Party	Candidate	Votes	%	±%
Labour	Mohammed Rafique*	4,903	67.4	−4.7
Green	Bobak Walker	912	12.5	+0.6
Conservative	Shaz Ahad	690	9.5	+2.6
Liberal Democrats	James Marshall	419	5.8	−0.2
Alliance for Green Socialism	Mike Davies	227	3.1	+0.0
SDP	Richard Cowles	55	0.1	N/A
Majority		3,991	54.9	−5.3
Turnout		7,274	39.2	+5.5
Labour hold		Swing	-2.7	

=== Cross Gates & Whinmoor ===
Cross Gates & Whinmoor
Party	Candidate	Votes	%	±%
Labour	James Gibson	2,826	43.3	−0.5
Conservative	Philip Moore	2,687	41.2	+20.4
Green	Keith Hale	378	5.8	−2.4
Independent	Mark Nicholson	286	4.4	N/A
UKIP	Harvey Alexander	157	2.4	−17.7
Liberal Democrats	Aqila Choudhry	145	2.2	−3.8
SDP	Jack Newcombe	21	0.0	−1.2
Majority		139	2.1	−20.9
Turnout		6,530	35.2	+8.8
Labour hold		Swing	-10.5	

=== Farnley & Wortley ===
Farnley & Wortley
Party	Candidate	Votes	%	±%
Green	David Blackburn*	2,293	39.0	−2.1
Labour	Matt Gibson	2,155	36.6	−0.1
Conservative	Cormac Trigg	1,004	17.1	+10.3
Yorkshire	Ian Cowling	315	5.4	N/A
Liberal Democrats	Maria Frank	77	1.3	−0.7
Majority		138	2.3	−2.1
Turnout		5,884	32.3	+4.9
Green hold		Swing	-1.1	

=== Garforth & Swillington ===
Garforth & Swillington
Party	Candidate	Votes	%	±%
Garforth and Swillington Independents	Sarah Field*	3,780	48.8	−14.1
Conservative	Mark Barratt	2,105	27.2	+14.1
Labour	Michael Bailey	1,317	17.0	+0.1
Green	Steve Beer	420	5.5	N/A
Liberal Democrats	Jake Knox	79	1.0	−1.9
Majority		1,675	21.6	−24.4
Turnout		7,749	47.5	+7.8
Garforth and Swillington Independents hold		Swing	-14.1	

=== Gipton & Harehills ===
Gipton & Harehills
Party	Candidate	Votes	%	±%
Labour	Arif Hussain*	3,854	73.4	−4.2
Conservative	Sandy Goodall	616	11.7	+5.4
Green	Alaric Hall	318	6.1	−0.4
Liberal Democrats	Darren Finlay	214	4.1	−0.5
TUSC	Iain Dalton	139	2.6	+0.0
SDP	Shaff Sheikh	113	2.2	−0.2
Majority		3,238	61.6	−9.6
Turnout		5,254	29.9	+3.3
Labour hold		Swing	-4.8	

=== Guiseley & Rawdon ===
Guiseley & Rawdon
Party	Candidate	Votes	%	±%
Conservative	Paul Alderson	4,069	45.6	+5.0
Labour Co-op	Eleanor Thomson	3,200	35.9	+9.8
Yorkshire	Bob Buxton	840	9.4	−2.5
Green	Nick Hodgkinson	458	5.1	−5.6
Liberal Democrats	Stuart Mcleod	274	3.1	−2.4
For Britain	Tom Hollings	47	0.1	N/A
Majority		869	9.7	−4.8
Turnout		8,925	47.7	+9.5
Conservative hold		Swing	-2.4	

=== Harewood ===
Harewood
Party	Candidate	Votes	%	±%
Conservative	Sam Firth*	5,080	67.3	−2.1
Labour	Michael Millar	1,347	17.9	+6.7
Green	Claire Evans	662	8.8	−3.9
Liberal Democrats	Dan Cook	383	5.1	−0.6
Majority		3,733	49.5	−6.2
Turnout		7,543	50.2	+11.6
Conservative hold		Swing	-4.4	

=== Headingley & Hyde Park ===
Headingley & Hyde Park
Party	Candidate	Votes	%	±%
Labour	Al Garthwaite*	3,087	56.2	+2.4
Green	Tim Goodall	1,628	29.7	+1.8
Conservative	Isaac Woolmer	274	5.0	+1.2
Liberal Democrats	Brandon Ashford	232	4.2	−6.9
Yorkshire	Tyler Wilson	99	1.8	±0.0
TUSC	Florian Hynam	65	1.2	N/A
Independent	Anthony Greaux	30	0.5	N/A'"`UNIQ−−ref−000000AC−QINU`"'
SDP	Michael Bellfield	10	0.2	N/A
Majority		1,459	26.6	+0.7
Turnout		5,490	22.3	−0.8
Labour hold		Swing		

=== Horsforth ===
Horsforth
Party	Candidate	Votes	%	±%
Conservative	Jonathon Taylor*	3,292	38.3	+0.9
Labour	John Garvani	2,642	30.7	+4.0
Liberal Democrats	Simon Dowling	1,750	20.4	+1.3
Green	William Jones	609	7.1	−4.8
Yorkshire	Roland Gilmore	219	2.5	N/A
Freedom Alliance. No Lockdowns. No Curfews.	Anne Mutch	45	0.1	N/A
Majority		650	7.5	−3.2
Turnout		8,593	47.8	+7.2
Conservative hold		Swing	-1.7	

=== Hunslet & Riverside ===
Hunslet & Riverside
Party	Candidate	Votes	%	±%
Labour	Mohammed Iqbal*	2,535	45.8	−0.5
Green	Ed Carlisle	2,303	41.7	−1.2
Conservative	Paul Rowden	456	8.2	+2.5
Liberal Democrats	Benedict Turner-Chastney	90	1.6	−2.0
TUSC	Nina Brown	52	0.9	N/A
SDP	Cordelia Lynan	43	0.8	N/A
Majority		232	4.2	−1.8
Turnout		5,529	31.5	+5.9
Labour hold		Swing	+0.4	

=== Killingbeck & Seacroft ===
Killingbeck & Seacroft
Party	Candidate	Votes	%	±%
Labour	David Jenkins*	2,946	62.0	+15.7
Conservative	David Frame	1,145	24.1	+14.1
Green	Alan Anthoney	391	8.2	+2.2
Liberal Democrats	John Otley	174	3.7	N/A
SDP	Hafizur Rahman	32	0.1	N/A
Majority		1,801	37.9	+9.4
Turnout		4,755	26.6	+4.4
Labour hold		Swing	+0.8	

=== Kippax & Methley ===
Kippax & Methley
Party	Candidate	Votes	%	±%
Labour	James Lewis*	3,500	52.2	+4.8
Conservative	Connor Mulhall	2,388	35.6	+10.1
Green	Dylan Brown	512	7.6	−13.4
Liberal Democrats	Sara Howell	143	2.1	−4.1
Reform	Kristian Wilkinson	116	0.2	N/A
SDP	Thomas Foster	22	0.0	N/A
Majority		1,112	16.6	−5.3
Turnout		6,711	39.4	+11.1
Labour hold		Swing	-2.7	

=== Kirkstall ===
Kirkstall
Party	Candidate	Votes	%	±%
Labour	Fiona Venner*	3,922	67.1	+4.6
Green	Victoria Smith	845	14.5	+0.1
Conservative	Reiss Capitano	773	13.2	+7.2
Liberal Democrats	Thomas Edwards	186	3.2	−3.4
TUSC	James Ellis	72	1.2	N/A
Majority		3,077	52.6	+4.5
Turnout		5,845	35.1	+4.4
Labour hold		Swing	+2.3	

=== Little London & Woodhouse ===
Little London & Woodhouse
Party	Candidate	Votes	%	±%
Labour	Javaid Akhtar*	2,641	65.2	−3.0
Green	Marcus Cain	689	17.0	+2.2
Conservative	Jordan Young	393	9.7	+4.2
Liberal Democrats	Iulian Biris	196	4.8	−0.7
TUSC	Michael Johnson	82	2.0	+0.1
Majority		1,952	48.2	+5.2
Turnout		4,048	20.8	+0.2
Labour hold		Swing	-2.6	

=== Middleton Park ===
Middleton Park
Party	Candidate	Votes	%	±%
Labour	Sharon Burke	2,313	40.9	−2.3
SDP	Wayne Dixon	1,963	34.7	+11.1
Conservative	Samantha Bennett	913	16.2	+10.2
Green	Kay-Lee Asquith	306	5.4	+0.5
Liberal Democrats	James Spencer	119	2.1	−1.1
Majority		350	6.2	−13.4
Turnout		5,653	27.8	+5.4
Labour hold		Swing	-6.7	

=== Moortown ===
Moortown
Party	Candidate	Votes	%	±%
Labour Co-op	Sharon Hamilton*	4,375	54.2	+6.0
Conservative	Rob Speed	1,900	23.5	+4.6
Green	Rachel Hartshorne	1,133	14.0	−2.5
Liberal Democrats	David Dresser	511	6.3	−10.0
SDP	Steve Wright	74	0.1	N/A
Majority		2,475	30.7	−1.4
Turnout		8,070	46.1	+10.08
Labour hold		Swing	+0.7	

=== Morley North ===
Morley North
Party	Candidate	Votes	%	±%
Morley Borough Independent	Andy Hutchinson*	2,922	42.0	−18.0
Conservative	Alan Shires	1,930	27.8	+13.3
Labour Co-op	Luke Mitchell	1,506	21.7	+5.4
Green	Eunice Agbemafle	389	5.6	−1.1
Liberal Democrats	Penelope Goodman	134	1.9	−0.6
SDP	Nigel Perry	33	0.0	N/A
Majority		992	14.2	−29.5
Turnout		6,953	38.0	+7.7
Morley Borough Independent hold		Swing	-15.7	

=== Morley South ===
Morley South
Party	Candidate	Votes	%	±%
Morley Borough Independent	Jane Senior	2,127	33.1	−17.4
Conservative	Michael Burnham	1,754	27.3	+14.7
Labour	Bailey Bradley	1,689	26.3	+0.1
Green	Chris Bell	608	9.5	+2.6
Liberal Democrats	Peter Richard Andrews	110	1.7	−1.1
SDP	Joshua Sturgeon	104	1.6	N/A
Majority		373	5.8	−18.5
Turnout		6,431	35.5	+8.0
Morley Borough Independent gain from Labour		Swing	-16.1	

=== Otley & Yeadon ===
Otley & Yeadon
Party	Candidate	Votes	%	±%
Liberal Democrats	Sandy Lay*	3,766	45.0	−4.6
Labour	Lucy Nuttgens	1,793	21.4	+1.9
Conservative	Stewart Harper	1,408	16.8	+7.5
Green	Mick Bradley	978	11.6	−1.4
Yorkshire	Claire Jane Buxton	387	4.6	N/A
Majority		1,973	23.5	−7.6
Turnout		8,378	46.9	+7.3
Liberal Democrats hold		Swing	-3.3	

=== Pudsey ===
Pudsey
Party	Candidate	Votes	%	±%
Conservative	Dawn Seary	4,609	56.5	+15.1
Labour	Mark Sewards	2,567	31.4	−6.2
Green	Suzanne Ward	419	5.1	−2.1
Yorkshire	Dan Woodlock	265	3.2	N/A
Liberal Democrats	Cynthia Dowling	248	3.0	−0.8
SDP	Daniel Walker	15	0.2	+0.2
Majority		2,042	25.0	+21.2
Turnout		8,164	42.6	+8.1
Conservative hold		Swing	+10.7	

=== Rothwell ===
Rothwell
Party	Candidate	Votes	%	±%
Liberal Democrats	Conrad Hart-Brooke	2,313	34.4	−7.6
Labour	Karen Bruce	2,212	32.9	+0.0
Conservative	Joe Boycott	1,543	23.0	+11.1
Yorkshire	Sean McDonald	359	5.3	N/A
Green	Ali Aliremzioglu	235	3.5	−2.0
SDP	Christopher Dudley	16	0.0	N/A
Majority		101	1.5	−7.6
Turnout		6,716	41.7	+8.6
Liberal Democrats hold		Swing	-3.8	

=== Roundhay ===
A casual vacancy was contested alongside the regular election following the resignation of Eleanor Tunnicliffe (Labour Party) in March 2021. The highest-placed candidate, Lisa Martin, received the full term and the second-placed candidate, Zara Hussain, filled the vacancy to complete Tunnicliffe's term of office until 2022.

Roundhay (2)
Party	Candidate	Votes	%	±%
Labour	Lisa Martin	4,357	58.2	+14.3
Labour	Zara Hussain	4,198	56.1	+12.2
Conservative	Elayna Cohen	1,583	21.2	+8.5
Conservative	Spencer Weiner	1,486	19.9	+7.2
Green	Richard Miles Wilson	1,225	16.4	+4.7
Liberal Democrats	Tony Quinn	941	12.6	−1.1
Liberal Democrats	Kavi Norris	575	7.7	−0.7
Alliance for Green Socialism	Malcolm Christie	363	4.9	+3.7
SDP	Max Partington	106	1.4	N/A
Freedom Alliance. No Lockdowns. No Curfews.	Darryl Bickler	98	1.3	N/A
SDP	Paul Whetstone	30	0.4	N/A
Majority		2,774	37.1	+6.9
Turnout		7,481	47.5	+7.8
Labour hold		Swing		
Labour hold		Swing		

=== Temple Newsam ===
Temple Newsam
Party	Candidate	Votes	%	±%
Labour	Helen Hayden*	2,785	44.5	+5.8
Conservative	Jonathan Firth	2,773	44.3	+13.5
Liberal Democrats	Keith Norman	338	5.4	−1.2
Green	Shahab Saqib Adris	320	5.1	−2.3
Majority		12	0.0	−7.9
Turnout		6,256	37.4	+6.7
Labour hold		Swing	-3.9	

=== Weetwood ===
Weetwood
Party	Candidate	Votes	%	±%
Labour Co-op	Emma Flint	3,540	47.2	+11.0
Liberal Democrats	Sharon Slinger	2,207	29.4	−12.0
Conservative	Angelo Basu	943	12.6	+6.6
Green	Christopher Foren	758	10.1	+1.7
Majority		1,333	17.8	+14.6
Turnout		7,496	45.9	+4.4
Labour hold		Swing	-11.5	

=== Wetherby ===
Wetherby
Party	Candidate	Votes	%	±%
Conservative	Alan Lamb*	4,563	58.0	+1.1
Green	Penny Stables	1,753	22.3	+12.8
Labour Co-op	Steve Clapcote	991	12.6	+2.9
Liberal Democrats	James Clark	527	6.7	−17.1
Majority		2,810	35.7	+3.6
Turnout		7,874	47.8	+9.2
Conservative hold		Swing	-5.9	
