= Kippax and Methley (ward) =

Electoral ward in Leeds, England

- Kippax and Methley highlighted within Leeds
- Population: 17,509 (2023 electorate)
- Metropolitan borough: City of Leeds
- Metropolitan county: West Yorkshire
- Region: Yorkshire and the Humber
- Country: England
- Sovereign state: United Kingdom
- UK Parliament: Selby
- Councillors: Mary Harland (Labour); James Lewis (Labour); Michael Millar (Labour)

Kippax and Methley is an electoral ward of Leeds City Council in south east Leeds, West Yorkshire, including the villages and civil parishes of Allerton Bywater, Kippax and Methley.

== Boundaries ==
The Kippax and Methley ward includes the following civil parishes of:

- Allerton Bywater
- Kippax
- Ledsham
- Ledston (Ledston with Ledston Luck Parish Council)
- Micklefield

== Councillors ==
Election	Councillor	Councillor	Councillor
2004	Keith Parker (Lab) (Note: Parker had previously represented Barwick and Kippax ward since 1986.)	James Lewis (Lab) (Note: Lewis had been a Barwick and Kippax ward councillor since 2003.)	Keith Wakefield (Lab) (Note: Wakefield had been a Barwick and Kippax ward councillor since 1988.)
2006	Keith Parker (Lab)	James Lewis (Lab)	Keith Wakefield (Lab)
2007	Keith Parker (Lab)	James Lewis (Lab)	Keith Wakefield (Lab)
2008	Keith Parker (Lab)	James Lewis (Lab)	Keith Wakefield (Lab)
2010	Keith Parker (Lab)	James Lewis (Lab)	Keith Wakefield (Lab)
2011	Keith Parker (Lab)	James Lewis (Lab)	Keith Wakefield (Lab)
2012	Mary Harland (Lab)	James Lewis (Lab)	Keith Wakefield (Lab)
2014	Mary Harland (Lab)	James Lewis (Lab)	Keith Wakefield (Lab)
2015	Mary Harland (Lab)	James Lewis (Lab)	Keith Wakefield (Lab)
2016	Mary Harland (Lab)	James Lewis (Lab)	Keith Wakefield OBE (Lab) (Note: Wakefield was awarded an OBE in the 2016 New Year Honours.)
2018	Mary Harland (Lab)	James Lewis (Lab)	Keith Wakefield OBE (Lab)
2019	Mary Harland (Lab)	James Lewis (Lab)	Mirelle Midgley (Lab)
2021	Mary Harland (Lab)	James Lewis (Lab)	Mirelle Midgley (Lab)
2022	Mary Harland (Lab)	James Lewis (Lab)	Mirelle Midgley (Lab)
2023	Mary Harland (Lab)	James Lewis (Lab)	Michael Millar (Lab)
2024	Mary Harland (Lab)	James Lewis (Lab)	Michael Millar (Lab)
2026	Mary Harland* (Lab)	James Lewis* (Lab)	Michael Millar* (Lab)

indicates seat up for re-election. * indicates incumbent councillor.

== Elections since 2010 ==
=== May 2026 ===
2026
Party	Candidate	Votes	%	±%
Labour	Mary Elizabeth Harland*	3,336	41.8	▼23.3
Reform	Chris Weightman	3,038	38.1	New
Conservative	Connor Mulhall	717	9.0	▼10.5
Green	Andy Phillips	674	8.5	▲0.3
Liberal Democrats	Thomas Leadley	208	2.6	▼4.7
Turnout			44.4	
Rejected ballots		18		
Registered electors		18,002		
Labour hold		Swing		

=== May 2024 ===
2024
Party	Candidate	Votes	%	±%
Labour	James Lewis*	3,570	65.1	+5.0
Conservative	Connor Mulhall	1,067	19.5	−6.4
Green	Angela Oldershaw	449	8.2	+0.5
Liberal Democrats	Greg Holden	401	7.3	+1.6
Majority		2,503	45.6	+11.4
Turnout		5,563	31.6	+1.5
Labour hold		Swing	+5.7	

=== May 2023 ===
2023
Party	Candidate	Votes	%	±%
Labour	Michael Millar	3,163	60.1	−3.0
Conservative	Connor Mulhall	1,362	25.9	−0.7
Green	Alan Martin	406	7.7	+2.0
Liberal Democrats	Lesley McIntee	301	5.7	+1.6
Majority		1,801	34.2	−2.4
Turnout		5,263	30.1	−3.6
Labour hold		Swing		

=== May 2022 ===
2022
Party	Candidate	Votes	%	±%
Labour	Mary Harland*	3,673	63.1	+10.9
Conservative	Connor Mulhall	1,545	26.6	−9.0
Green	Keith Hale	330	5.7	−2.7
Liberal Democrats	Christine Golton	243	4.1	+2.0
Majority		2,128	36.6	+20.0
Turnout		5,819	33.7%	−5.7
Labour hold		Swing		

=== May 2021 ===
2021
Party	Candidate	Votes	%	±%
Labour	James Lewis*	3,500	52.2	+4.8
Conservative	Connor Mulhall	2,388	35.6	+10.1
Green	Dylan Brown	512	7.6	−13.4
Liberal Democrats	Sara Howell	143	2.1	−4.1
Reform	Kristian Wilkinson	116	0.2	N/A
SDP	Thomas Foster	22	0.0	N/A
Majority		1,112	16.6	−5.3
Turnout		6,711	39.4	+11.1
Labour hold		Swing		

=== May 2019 ===
2019
Party	Candidate	Votes	%	±%
Labour	Mirelle Midgley	2,149	47.4	−7.3
Conservative	James Egan	1,155	25.5	+1.8
Green	Dylan Brown	950	21.0	+7.8
Liberal Democrats	Conrad Hart-Brooke	280	6.2	+6.1
Majority		994	21.9	−9.1
Turnout		4,658	28.3	−4.57
Labour hold		Swing	-4.6	

=== May 2018 ===
2018
Party	Candidate	Votes	%	±%
Labour	Mary Harland*	3,135	54.7	−1.1
Labour	James Lewis*	3,027		
Labour	Keith Wakefield*	2,856		
Conservative	Chris Calvert	1,355	23.7	+6.2
Conservative	Nicholas Fawcett	1,348		
Conservative	Tess Wheldon	1,049		
Green	Dylan Brown	758	13.2	+10.0
UKIP	Tina Smith	474	8.3	−20.0
UKIP	Paul Spivey	439		
UKIP	Sheila Shippey	323		
Liberal Democrats	Mitchell Galdas	5	0.08	−3.28
Majority		1,780	31.0	−4.5
Turnout		16,398	32.87	−1.63
Labour hold		Swing		
Labour hold		Swing		
Labour hold		Swing		

=== May 2016 ===
2016
Party	Candidate	Votes	%	±%
Labour	Mary Harland*	3,122	55.8	+6.3
UKIP	Paul Spivey	1,138	20.3	+3.3
Conservative	Ines Newell	978	17.5	7.8
Liberal Democrats	Elizabeth Hindley	181	3.2	+0.2
Green	Stephen Paul Terry	180	3.2	−2.0
Majority		1,984	35.5	+11.2
Turnout		5,599	35.0	
Labour hold		Swing		

=== May 2015 ===
2015
Party	Candidate	Votes	%	±%
Labour	James Lewis*	5,639	49.5	−13.8
Conservative	Thomas Crosfill	2,878	25.3	+3.6
UKIP	Tina Smith	1,934	17.0	+7.7
Green	Emma Dobson	590	5.2	+5.2
Liberal Democrats	Carmel Harrison	344	3.0	−2.7
Majority		2,761	24.3	−17.2
Turnout		11,385	69.5	
Labour hold		Swing	-8.7	

=== May 2014 ===
2014
Party	Candidate	Votes	%	±%
Labour	Keith Wakefield*	2,868		
UKIP	Tina Smith	1,599		
Conservative	James Langley	867		
Green	David Webb	237		
Liberal Democrats	John Hills	141		
Majority		1,269		
Turnout			35.63	
Labour hold		Swing		

=== May 2012 ===
2012
Party	Candidate	Votes	%	±%
Labour	Mary Harland	3,543	63.8	+0.6
UKIP	Paul Spivey	889	16.0	+6.7
Conservative	James Langley	871	15.7	−6.1
Liberal Democrats	Audrey Brown	247	4.5	−1.2
Majority		2,654	47.8	+6.3
Turnout		5,550		
Labour hold		Swing	-3.0	

=== May 2011 ===
2011
Party	Candidate	Votes	%	±%
Labour	James Lewis*	4,156	63.3	+12.0
Conservative	James Langley	1,428	21.7	−3.1
UKIP	Paul Spivey	609	9.3	+4.2
Liberal Democrats	Anne Bagnall	374	5.7	−7.6
Majority		2,728	41.5	+15.0
Turnout		6,567	41	
Labour hold		Swing	+7.5	

=== May 2010 ===
2010
Party	Candidate	Votes	%	±%
Labour	Keith Wakefield*	5,748	51.3	+0.7
Conservative	Tina Phillips	2,782	24.8	−3.7
Liberal Democrats	Matthew Coleman	1,487	13.3	+4.9
BNP	Shaun Fitzpatrick	624	5.6	−6.9
UKIP	Paul Spivey	571	5.1	+5.1
Majority		2,966	26.5	+4.5
Turnout		11,212	68.9	+31.1
Labour hold		Swing	+2.2	
