= Morley Borough Independents =

- Abbreviation: MBI
- Leader: Robert Finnigan
- Founded: 7 January 2004; 22 years ago
- Headquarters: Springfield House; 1 Church Street; Gildersome; Leeds; LS27 7AE
- Ideology: Independent politics Localism
- Colours: Green
- Leeds City Council (Morley seats): 3 / 6
- Morley Town Council: 22 / 26

Website
- morleyindependent.blogspot.com

The Morley Borough Independents (MBI) are a local political party in Leeds, West Yorkshire, founded in 2004.

Their stated aim is to represent the interests of the residents of Morley and the former Municipal Borough of Morley on Leeds City Council, arguing they "are not effected by having to toe the party line laid down in Westminster" by national political parties including the Conservative Party, Labour Party and Liberal Democrats.

== History ==
Founded in January 2004, prior to the upcoming Leeds City Council election in May, the creation of the Morley Borough Independents formalised an informal grouping of independent council candidates who had stood in the Morley North and Morley South wards since 2002 as well as elected Morley Town Councillors since the Town Council's creation in 2000. They had successfully coordinated the elections of two independent Morley North councillors in 2002 (Robert Finnigan) and 2003 (Thomas Leadley).

A number of MBI candidates and councillors had previously stood as candidates for other political parties. Finnigan had been a Labour councillor for Middleton ward from 1995 to 1999 and Leadley had stood as the Liberal Democrat candidate for Morley South in consecutive elections from 1988 to 1996. Subsequent Morley South councillor, Judith Elliott, had previously stood as the Conservative candidate in the ward in 2003.

In the 2004 election, the party won all six of the council seats it contested across the two Morley wards. In particular, Morley South had been a traditional Labour ward, returning Labour councillors at 22 of the 23 previous elections since 1973. The only exception had been the election of one Conservative councillor in 1983.

One of their Morley North ward councillors, Stewart McArdle, later resigned from the party in May 2005 to sit as an independent member of the council, citing being "cheesed off... [with an] utter lack of communication" in the party but confirmed there was no animosity between him and his former party colleagues. McArdle remained a councillor until he lost his seat at the 2007 election. He then stood as an independent again in Ardsley and Robin Hood ward in 2008 and the Conservative candidate in the same ward in 2010.

At the 2006 election, a 10.1% swing away from the MBIs saw the first and only British National Party (BNP) councillor, Chris Beverley, elected in Leeds. When Beverley's seat was up for re-election in 2010, the party won the seat back after Shirley Varley defeated him.

In 2009, Judith Elliott was elected as the first Lord Mayor of Leeds from outside of the three major UK parties on Leeds City Council since the creation of the City of Leeds Metropolitan District Council in the Local Government Act 1972.

The party stood an official MBI candidate in Ardsley and Robin Hood ward for the first and only time in 2012 election. Wyn Kidger came last out of the four candidates who stood in the ward, receiving 13.6% of the vote. She stood again in 2014 as an independent candidate although supported by the party. She received 9.3% of all of the votes cast, coming out of six candidates. Kidger was later elected as a Morley South ward councillor in 2018.

Finnigan was the founding leader of the MBI's Council Group from 2004 until he lost his bid for re-election in 2018. Having represented Morley North ward since 2002, he chose not to stand again for the ward at the 2018 election and chose to stand as one of the party's three candidates in Morley South instead. Finnigan came third out of the three MBI candidates who stood but, as incumbent Labour councillor Neil Dawson received finished second out of all of the candidates, he was not re-elected.

At the 2019 election, the MBIs retained both of their seats in Morley North and South wards. Finnigan was re-elected as a councillor for Morley North after replacing Tom Leadley as the MBI candidate in the ward. With the party's support, Leadley stood unsuccessfully for Ardsley and Robin Hood as an independent. He therefore became the party's council group leader again, having Judith Elliott taken over the role for the year during Finnigan's absence.

Dawson announced his retirement from the council ahead of the 2021 and Jane Senior went on to gain the final Morley South seat from Labour. For the first time in a decade since 2011, the party then held all six of the town's city council seats, until Wyn Kidger and Bob Gettings left the party to sit as independents.

Both before and after the May 2026 elections, the party held three city council seats.

== Electoral results ==
Election	Total votes		Leeds City Council seats					
Election	#	% city-wide	Morley North	±	Morley South	±	Ardsley & Robin Hood	±
2004	17,292	2.6	3 / 3	Steady	3 / 3	Steady	did not stand	
2006	4,749	2.4	2 / 3	▼1 (Note: Stewart McArdle resigned from the MBI council group in May 2005.)	2 / 3	▼1 (Note: The MBIs lost a Morley South seat to the BNP.)	did not stand	
2007	5,454	2.7	3 / 3	▲1 (Note: The MBIs defeated McArdle at the 2007 election.)	2 / 3	Steady	did not stand	
2008	6,379	3.3	3 / 3	Steady	2 / 3	Steady	did not stand	
2010	6,900	2.0	3 / 3	Steady	3 / 3	▲1	did not stand	
2011	5,718	2.7	3 / 3	Steady	2 / 3	▼1	did not stand	
2012	6,833 (Note: Wyn Kidger stood as an MBI candidate in Ardsley and Robin Hood ward.)	3.9	3 / 3	Steady	2 / 3	Steady	0 / 3	Steady
2014	4,726 (Note: With MBI support, Wyn Kidger stood as an independent candidate in Ardsley and Robin Hood ward.)	2.5	3 / 3	Steady	2 / 3	Steady	0 / 3	Steady
2015	6,794	1.9	3 / 3	Steady	2 / 3	Steady	did not stand	
2016	5,079	2.8	3 / 3	Steady	2 / 3	Steady	did not stand	
2018	15,822	2.9	3 / 3	Steady	2 / 3	Steady	did not stand	
2019	6,439 (Note: With MBI support, incumbent Morley North councillor, Tom Leadley, did not stand again in his ward, standing as an independent candidate in Ardsley and Robin Hood ward instead.)	3.3	3 / 3	Steady	2 / 3	Steady	0 / 3	Steady
2021	5,049	2.3	3 / 3	Steady	3 / 3	▲1	did not stand	
2022	5,422	2.6	3 / 3	Steady	3 / 3	Steady	did not stand	
2023	4,542	2.5	3 / 3	Steady	3 / 3	Steady	did not stand	
2024	4,538	2.3	2 / 3	▼1	2 / 3	▼1	did not stand	
2026	7,364	3.1	1 / 2	Steady	0 / 1	▼1	did not stand	
