= 2007 Leeds City Council election =

- 3 May 2007

33 of the 99 seats on Leeds City Council 50 seats needed for a majority
- Turnout: 37.52% (▲1.62%)
	First party	Second party	Third party
Leader	Keith Wakefield	Mark Harris	Andrew Carter
Party	Labour	Liberal Democrats	Conservative
Last election	16 seats, 31.6%	8 seats, 21.4%	7 seats, 27.0%
Seats won	15	8	7
Seats after	43	24	22
Seat change	▲3	▼1	▼2
Popular vote	65,260	39,529	53,829
Percentage	32.5%	19.7%	27.0%
	Fourth party	Fifth party	Sixth party
Party	Morley Borough Independents	Green	BNP
Last election	1 seat, 2.4%	1 seat, 4.6%	1 seats, 11.4%
Seats won	2	1	0
Seats after	5	3	1
Seat change	▲1	Steady	Steady
Popular vote	5,454	7,857	22,407
Percentage	2.7%	3.9%	11.2%
- Labour in red (15), Liberal Democrats in yellow (8), Conservatives in blue (7), Morley Borough Independents in dark green (2) and Greens in green (1).
Council control before election
Coalition
Liberal Democrats and Conservatives
Council control after election
Coalition
Liberal Democrats and Conservatives

The 2007 Leeds City Council election took place on Thursday 3 May 2007 to elect members of Leeds City Council in England.

As per the election cycle, one third of the council's 99 seats were contested. Those seats up for election were those of the second-placed candidate elected for every ward at the 2004 all-out election, who had been granted a three-year term to expire in 2007.

Despite Labour gaining three council seats, the council remained in no overall control as no political party had an overall majority of councillors. In coalition since 2004, the Liberal Democrat and Conservative council administration continued.

== Election result ==
Leeds local election result 2007
Party	Seats	Gains	Losses	Net gain/loss	Seats %	Votes %	Votes	+/−
Labour	15	3	0	▲3	45.4	32.5	65,260	+0.9
Conservative	7	0	2	▼2	21.2	27.0	53,829	-0.2
Liberal Democrats	8	0	1	▼1	24.2	19.7	39,529	-1.7
BNP	0	0	0	0	0.0	11.2	22,407	-0.2
Green	1	0	0	0	3.0	3.9	7,857	-0.7
Morley Borough Independent	2	0	0	0	6.1	2.7	5,454	+0.3
UKIP	0	0	0	0	0.0	0.9	1,816	+0.9
Alliance for Green Socialism	0	0	0	0	0.0	0.9	1,717	-0.1
Independent	0	0	0	0	0.0	0.8	1,680	+0.7
English Democrat	0	0	0	0	0.0	0.3	523	0.0
Respect	0	0	0	0	0.0	0.1	520	+0.1
CPA	0	0	0	0	0.0	0.1	129	0.0

This result had the following consequences for the total number of seats on the council after the elections:

Party	2006 election	Prior to election	New council
Labour	40	40	43
Liberal Democrat	26	25 (Note: Brian Jennings (Weetwood) left the Liberal Democrats after the 2006 election to sit as an independent.)	24
Conservative	24	24	22
Morley Borough Independent	4	4	5
Green	3	3	3
BNP	1	1	1
Independent	1 (Note: Former Morley Borough Independent Stewart McArdle (Morley North) resigned from the party in May 2005 to sit as an independent.)	2	1
Total	99	99	99
Working majority	-19	-19	-13

== Councillors who did not stand for re-election ==
Councillor/s who did not stand for re-election (1)
Councillor	Ward	First elected	Party	Reason	Successor
Andrew Millard	Wetherby	2003	Conservative	stood down	Alan Lamb (Conservative)

== Ward results ==
Adel & Wharfedale
Party	Candidate	Votes	%	±%
Conservative	Les Carter*	3,897	51.7	−1.8
Liberal Democrats	Christina Shaw	2,265	30.0	+3.0
Labour	Rosemary Pickard	909	12.1	−0.1
BNP	Jason Harland	272	3.6	+3.6
English Democrat	Stephen Elliott	197	2.6	−4.7
Majority		1,632	21.6	−4.9
Turnout		7,540	47.7	−0.3
Conservative hold		Swing	-2.4	

Alwoodley
Party	Candidate	Votes	%	±%
Conservative	Ruth Feldman*	3,873	52.3	+1.9
Labour	Richard Masterton	1,599	21.6	+1.7
Liberal Democrats	John Clay	1,148	15.5	−10.5
UKIP	Warren Hendon	326	4.4	+4.4
BNP	Christine Whitaker	261	3.5	+3.5
Alliance for Green Socialism	Brian Jackson	204	2.8	−1.0
Majority		2,274	30.7	+6.3
Turnout		7,411	42.7	+0.9
Conservative hold		Swing	+0.1	

Ardsley & Robin Hood
Party	Candidate	Votes	%	±%
Labour	Jack Dunn*	1,967	35.3	−0.6
BNP	Joanna Beverley	1,538	27.6	+5.1
Conservative	David Boynton	1,181	21.2	−4.9
Liberal Democrats	Philip Moore	567	10.2	−5.4
UKIP	David Daniel	325	5.8	+5.8
Majority		429	7.7	−2.0
Turnout		5,578	35.9	+2.4
Labour hold		Swing	-2.8	

Armley
Party	Candidate	Votes	%	±%
Labour	James McKenna*	2,287	46.1	+4.0
Conservative	Glenn Broadbent	737	14.8	+1.3
Liberal Democrats	Alistair Bradley	676	13.6	+0.8
BNP	Sean Fitzpatrick	656	13.2	−4.3
Green	Yvonne Clarke	610	12.3	−1.8
Majority		1,550	31.2	+6.6
Turnout		4,966	28.8	−1.7
Labour hold		Swing	+1.3	

Beeston & Holbeck
Party	Candidate	Votes	%	±%
Labour	Adam Ogilvie*	2,079	44.1	+4.5
Conservative	Robert Winfield	889	18.9	+5.0
BNP	Dean Taylor	703	14.9	−3.0
Liberal Democrats	James Fuller	591	12.5	−10.9
Green	Andrea Binns	269	5.7	+0.6
UKIP	Darren Oddy	181	3.8	+3.8
Majority		1,190	25.3	+9.2
Turnout		4,712	30.6	−1.0
Labour hold		Swing	-0.2	

Bramley & Stanningley
Party	Candidate	Votes	%	±%
Labour	Ted Hanley*	2,123	41.1	+0.6
BNP	Gary Roberts	971	18.8	+1.0
Conservative	Michael Best	820	15.9	+0.1
Liberal Democrats	Adam Slack	599	11.6	−4.6
English Democrat	Dean Locke	326	6.3	+6.3
Green	Pamela Brown	325	6.3	−0.7
Majority		1,152	22.3	−0.4
Turnout		5,164	32.1	+1.9
Labour hold		Swing	-0.2	

Burmantofts & Richmond Hill
Party	Candidate	Votes	%	±%
Liberal Democrats	Richard Brett*	2,331	48.1	+5.8
Labour	Ronald Grahame	1,450	29.9	−1.8
BNP	Mark Collett	898	18.5	−3.3
Conservative	Elliott Burton	164	3.4	−0.8
Majority		881	18.2	+7.6
Turnout		4,843	32.1	−1.7
Liberal Democrats hold		Swing	+3.8	

Calverley & Farsley
Party	Candidate	Votes	%	±%
Conservative	Amanda Carter*	3,775	53.5	+6.6
Labour	Andrew Jarosz	1,635	23.2	−2.3
BNP	Robert Leary	872	12.4	−1.8
Liberal Democrats	Kathryn Gagen	778	11.0	−2.5
Majority		2,140	30.3	+8.8
Turnout		7,060	41.7	+1.2
Conservative hold		Swing	+4.4	

Chapel Allerton
Party	Candidate	Votes	%	±%
Labour	Mohammed Rafique*	2,967	51.8	+4.8
Liberal Democrats	Aqila Choudhry	833	14.6	−13.2
Conservative	Simon Baker	774	13.5	+3.1
Alliance for Green Socialism	Beverley Samuels	535	9.3	+0.3
Green	Mark Elliot	432	7.5	+1.9
BNP	David Whitaker	183	3.2	+3.2
Majority		2,134	37.3	+18.0
Turnout		5,724	33.7	−2.8
Labour hold		Swing	+9.0	

City & Hunslet
Party	Candidate	Votes	%	±%
Labour	Patrick Davey*	1,647	43.6	−3.3
Liberal Democrats	Paul Swain	552	14.6	−13.8
Respect	Muserat Sujawal	520	13.8	+7.5
BNP	John Atkinson	440	11.6	+11.6
Conservative	Syed Hassan-Shah	361	9.6	−1.3
Green	Michael Northfield	215	5.7	−1.8
Alliance for Green Socialism	Allan House	42	1.1	+1.1
Majority		1,095	29.0	+10.5
Turnout		3,777	22.4	−4.3
Labour hold		Swing	+5.2	

Cross Gates & Whinmoor
Party	Candidate	Votes	%	±%
Labour	Pauleen Grahame*	2,619	41.7	+2.7
Conservative	Liz Hayes	1,984	31.6	+0.2
BNP	Helen Foster	894	14.2	−0.5
Liberal Democrats	Ann Norman	779	12.4	+3.1
Majority		635	10.1	+2.4
Turnout		6,276	37.8	+0.7
Labour hold		Swing	+1.2	

Farnley & Wortley
Party	Candidate	Votes	%	±%
Green	Ann Blackburn*	2,284	39.7	+0.9
Labour	Stephen Towler	1,607	27.9	+0.3
BNP	Sheree Smith	760	13.2	−3.3
Conservative	George Firth	649	11.3	+0.8
Liberal Democrats	Michael Taylor	268	4.7	
UKIP	Syd Hobson	165	2.9	+2.9
Alliance for Green Socialism	Declan Normaschild	23	0.4	−0.3
Majority		677	11.8	+0.7
Turnout		5,756	33.5	−0.8
Green hold		Swing	+0.3	

Garforth & Swillington
Party	Candidate	Votes	%	±%
Labour	Mark Dobson	4,196	54.3	+12.8
Conservative	Mark Phillips*	2,482	32.1	−6.0
BNP	Peter Lee	574	7.4	−4.9
Liberal Democrats	Robert Jacques	479	6.2	−1.9
Majority		1,714	22.2	+18.8
Turnout		7,731	49.1	−1.4
Labour gain from Conservative		Swing	+9.4	

Gipton & Harehills
Party	Candidate	Votes	%	±%
Labour	Arif Hussain	3,432	50.8	+2.9
Liberal Democrats	Javaid Akhtar*	2,563	37.9	−6.7
BNP	Peter Maverick	381	5.6	+5.6
Conservative	Beatrice Greenwood	222	3.3	−1.3
Green	Andrew Parnham	106	1.6	+1.6
Alliance for Green Socialism	Azar Iqbal	54	0.8	−2.1
Majority		869	12.9	+9.6
Turnout		6,758	43.0	+5.8
Labour gain from Liberal Democrats		Swing	+4.8	

Guiseley & Rawdon
Party	Candidate	Votes	%	±%
Conservative	Stuart Andrew*	3,207	47.4	+5.2
Labour	Mike King	1,943	28.7	+2.3
Liberal Democrats	Cindy Cleasby	838	12.4	−3.3
BNP	Wayne Taylor	398	5.9	−3.1
Green	Colin Avison	339	5.0	−1.0
Alliance for Green Socialism	Gareth Christie	43	0.6	−0.2
Majority		1,264	18.7	+2.9
Turnout		6,768	40.7	−0.6
Conservative hold		Swing	+1.4	

Harewood
Party	Candidate	Votes	%	±%
Conservative	Rachel Procter*	4,614	68.1	+5.8
Labour	Danial Adilypour	891	13.2	+0.3
Liberal Democrats	Aoife Maher	468	6.9	−2.7
BNP	Martin Gibson	443	6.5	−4.3
Green	Kate Bisson	304	4.5	+0.6
Alliance for Green Socialism	Fiona Christie	53	0.8	+0.3
Majority		3,723	55.0	+5.5
Turnout		6,773	46.5	−1.6
Conservative hold		Swing	+2.7	

Headingley
Party	Candidate	Votes	%	±%
Liberal Democrats	James Monaghan*	1,203	47.8	+6.1
Labour	Katherine Mitchell	577	22.9	−2.1
Green	Lesley Jeffries	378	15.0	−3.3
Conservative	Christopher Wales	238	9.4	−2.2
Alliance for Green Socialism	Sequoyah de Souza Vigneswaren	79	3.1	−0.1
BNP	Lawrence Hansard	44	1.7	+1.7
Majority		626	24.9	+8.3
Turnout		2,519	17.8	−1.1
Liberal Democrats hold		Swing	+4.1	

Horsforth
Party	Candidate	Votes	%	±%
Liberal Democrats	Andrew Barker*	2,626	37.0	−1.4
Conservative	Richard Hardcastle	2,599	36.7	−0.3
Labour	Nigel Gill	828	11.7	−2.5
Green	Stuart Thornton	344	4.9	−3.6
BNP	Ian Asquith	323	4.6	+4.6
Independent	Douglas Holmes	178	2.5	+2.5
UKIP	Sandi Crabtree	127	1.8	+1.8
CPA	Paul Hellyer	65	0.9	−1.2
Majority		27	0.4	−1.0
Turnout		7,090	41.3	+2.0
Liberal Democrats hold		Swing	-0.5	

Hyde Park & Woodhouse
Party	Candidate	Votes	%	±%
Liberal Democrats	Kabeer Hussain*	1,390	43.8	+5.0
Labour	Kamila Maqsood	1,037	32.7	−5.2
Green	Tim Sunderland	333	10.5	−7.2
Conservative	Syprian Pitkin	200	6.3	+6.3
BNP	Bernard Allen	101	3.2	+3.2
Alliance for Green Socialism	Hatan Aslam	58	1.8	−1.0
Independent	Sairab Shah	51	1.6	−1.2
Majority		353	11.1	+10.1
Turnout		3,170	21.4	+2.9
Liberal Democrats hold		Swing	+5.1	

Killingbeck & Seacroft
Party	Candidate	Votes	%	±%
Labour	Vonnie Morgan*	2,789	54.2	+2.1
BNP	John Powell	862	16.7	−2.9
Liberal Democrats	Sadie Fisher	799	15.5	−1.3
Conservative	Donald Townsley	698	13.6	+2.1
Majority		1,927	37.4	+4.9
Turnout		5,148	32.0	+16.2
Labour hold		Swing	+2.5	

Kippax & Methley
Party	Candidate	Votes	%	±%
Labour	James Lewis*	3,403	55.8	+3.0
Conservative	Tina Phillips	1,422	23.3	+3.4
BNP	Mark Powell	754	12.4	−5.0
Liberal Democrats	Geoffrey Warrington	515	8.5	−1.4
Majority		1,981	32.5	−0.5
Turnout		6,094	38.8	−2.4
Labour hold		Swing	-0.2	

Kirkstall
Party	Candidate	Votes	%	±%
Labour	John Illingworth*	2,236	43.7	−1.8
Liberal Democrats	Ruth Coleman	1,743	34.1	+1.4
BNP	Sandra Cockayne	380	7.4	+7.4
Green	Martin Reed	378	7.4	−4.0
Conservative	Jeremy Kapp	374	7.3	−3.0
Majority		493	9.6	−3.2
Turnout		5,111	32.0	+2.8
Labour hold		Swing	-1.6	

Middleton Park
Party	Candidate	Votes	%	±%
Labour	Judith Blake*	2,467	46.7	+4.1
BNP	Kevin Meeson	1,817	34.4	+5.8
Liberal Democrats	Benedict Chastney	537	10.2	−1.4
Conservative	Abdul Kotia	467	8.8	−8.4
Majority		650	12.3	−1.7
Turnout		5,288	31.9	+2.5
Labour hold		Swing	-0.8	

Moortown
Party	Candidate	Votes	%	±%
Liberal Democrats	Brenda Lancaster*	3,061	40.1	+6.3
Labour	Gerry Harper	2,383	31.2	−0.5
Conservative	Lyn Buckley	1,600	21.0	−8.2
Alliance for Green Socialism	Michael Davies	254	3.3	−2.1
BNP	Peter Cliff	240	3.1	+3.1
UKIP	Jeff Miles	99	1.3	+1.3
Majority		678	8.9	+6.8
Turnout		7,637	44.9	+3.8
Liberal Democrats hold		Swing	+3.4	

Morley North
Party	Candidate	Votes	%	±%
Morley Borough Independent	Bob Gettings	3,069	41.0	−1.4
BNP	Tom Redmond	1,328	17.7	−3.6
Independent	Stewart McArdle*	1,163	15.5	+15.5
Labour	Paul Mullen	1,018	13.6	−6.0
Conservative	Jason Aldiss	674	9.0	−2.5
Liberal Democrats	Christopher Lovell	231	3.1	−1.9
Majority		1,741	23.3	+2.3
Turnout		7,483	43.3	+3.4
Morley Borough Independent hold		Swing	+1.1	

Morley South
Party	Candidate	Votes	%	±%
Morley Borough Independent	Terry Grayshon*	2,385	35.9	+7.6
BNP	Mike Mee	1,928	29.0	−3.9
Labour	David Langham	1,385	20.8	−1.4
Conservative	Keely Jamieson	539	8.1	−0.6
Independent	Charles Slingsby	206	3.1	+0.3
Liberal Democrats	Jamie Saddler	201	3.0	−2.0
Majority		457	6.9	+2.3
Turnout		6,644	41.7	+2.6
Morley Borough Independent hold		Swing	+5.7	

Otley & Yeadon
Party	Candidate	Votes	%	±%
Liberal Democrats	Colin Campbell*	3,464	44.1	+5.4
Labour	John Eveleigh	1,833	23.3	+1.5
Conservative	John Sharples	1,799	22.9	−5.1
BNP	Richard Warrington	361	4.6	−2.2
Green	David Webb	263	3.3	−0.3
Alliance for Green Socialism	Simon Fearn	68	0.9	−0.2
CPA	Theresa Hellyer	64	0.8	+0.8
Majority		1,631	20.8	+10.2
Turnout		7,852	45.6	−1.5
Liberal Democrats hold		Swing	+1.9	

Pudsey
Party	Candidate	Votes	%	±%
Labour	Richard Lewis*	2,917	41.8	+5.0
Conservative	Joseph Marjoram	2,257	32.4	+1.1
BNP	John Hirst	816	11.7	−4.7
Liberal Democrats	John Skinner	471	6.8	−3.2
UKIP	Phil Banks	261	3.7	+3.7
Green	Irene Dracup	250	3.6	−2.0
Majority		660	9.5	+3.9
Turnout		6,972	41.1	+1.0
Labour hold		Swing	+1.9	

Rothwell
Party	Candidate	Votes	%	±%
Liberal Democrats	Steve Smith*	2,453	41.4	+0.8
Labour	Karen Bruce	2,166	36.6	+2.4
BNP	Tracy Andrews	664	11.2	−3.2
Conservative	Matthew Robinson	639	10.8	+0.1
Majority		287	4.8	−1.7
Turnout		5,922	38.5	+1.3
Liberal Democrats hold		Swing	-0.8	

Roundhay
Party	Candidate	Votes	%	±%
Conservative	Valerie Kendall*	2,976	40.2	+0.7
Labour	Alex Sobel	2,409	32.5	−0.5
Liberal Democrats	Altaf Hussein	931	12.6	−3.8
Green	Paul Ellis	601	8.1	+0.1
BNP	Mark Ferguson	268	3.6	+3.6
Alliance for Green Socialism	Malcolm Christie	219	3.0	−0.1
Majority		567	7.7	+1.3
Turnout		7,404	43.7	+0.6
Conservative hold		Swing	+0.6	

Temple Newsam
Party	Candidate	Votes	%	±%
Labour	Jacqueline Langdale	2,388	34.0	−1.7
Conservative	David Schofield*	2,294	32.6	+3.3
BNP	Peter Hollings	1,642	23.4	+1.2
Liberal Democrats	Keith Norman	707	10.1	−2.9
Majority		94	1.3	−5.1
Turnout		7,031	44.1	+2.2
Labour gain from Conservative		Swing	-2.5	

Weetwood
Party	Candidate	Votes	%	±%
Liberal Democrats	Sue Bentley*	2,784	47.5	+3.8
Conservative	Martin West	1,413	24.1	+1.3
Labour	Mohammed Azam	808	13.8	−4.9
Green	Martin Hemingway	426	7.3	+0.0
BNP	Gillian Leake	265	4.5	−1.8
Alliance for Green Socialism	Daniel Kennedy	85	1.4	+0.1
Independent	Cat Procter	82	1.4	+1.4
Majority		1,371	23.4	+2.6
Turnout		5,863	35.2	+1.4
Liberal Democrats hold		Swing	+1.2	

Wetherby
Party	Candidate	Votes	%	±%
Conservative	Alan Lamb	4,011	60.3	+3.2
Labour	Jolene Cassell	1,265	19.0	+3.1
Liberal Democrats	James Matthews	678	10.2	−4.0
BNP	David Craven	370	5.6	−7.4
UKIP	Tony Robson	332	5.0	+5.0
Majority		2,746	41.3	+0.2
Turnout		6,656	43.3	−0.7
Conservative hold		Swing	+0.0	
