= 2010 Leeds City Council election =

- 6 May 2010

33 of the 99 seats on Leeds City Council 50 seats needed for a majority
	First party	Second party	Third party
Leader	Keith Wakefield	Andrew Carter	Richard Brett
Party	Labour	Conservative	Liberal Democrats
Last election	13 seats, 28.8%	9 seats, 30.7%	9 seats, 19.1%
Seats won	20	6	5
Seats after	48	22	21
Seat change	▲5	▼1	▼3
Popular vote	124,847	92,987	85,905
Percentage	35.7%	26.6%	24.5%
	Fourth party	Fifth party	Sixth party
Party	Morley Borough Independents	Green	BNP
Last election	2 seats, 3.2%	1 seats, 3.7%	0 seats, 11.4%
Seats won	2	0	0
Seats after	6	2	0
Seat change	▲1	▼1	▼1
Popular vote	6,900	8,525	23,759
Percentage	2.0%	2.4%	6.8%
- Labour in red (20), Conservatives in blue (6), Liberal Democrats in yellow (5) and Morley Borough Independents in dark green (2).
Council control before election
Coalition
Liberal Democrats and Conservatives
Council control after election
Minority administration
Labour

The 2010 Leeds City Council election took place on Thursday 6 May 2010 to elect members of Leeds City Council in England. It was held on the same day as the 2010 general election and other local elections across the UK.

As per the election cycle, one third of the council's seats were up for election. The subsequently elected councillors replaced those elected when their individual seats were previously contested in 2006.

The result of the election saw the Labour Party gain five council seats and take minority control of the council. They held 48 of the 99 total seats and negotiated a confidence-and-supply agreement with the two Green Party councillors to achieve a majority. It replaced a six-year coalition between the Liberal Democrats and the Conservatives, which had also been supported by the three Green councillors before the election.

== Election result ==
Leeds local election result 2010
Party	Seats	Gains	Losses	Net gain/loss	Seats %	Votes %	Votes	+/−
Labour	20	5	0	▲5	60.6	35.7	124,847	+6.9
Conservative	6	0	1	▼1	18.2	26.6	92,987	-4.1
Liberal Democrats	5	0	3	▼3	15.1	24.5	85,905	+5.4
BNP	0	0	1	▼1	0.0	6.8	23,759	-4.6
Green	0	0	1	▼1	0.0	2.4	8,525	-1.4
Morley Borough Independent	2	1	0	▲1	6.1	2.0	6,900	-1.3
UKIP	0	0	0	Steady	0.0	0.9	2,993	-0.0
Alliance for Green Socialism	0	0	0	Steady	0.0	0.7	2,550	-0.3
Independent	0	0	0	Steady	0.0	0.4	1,465	-0.4

This result had the following consequences for the total number of seats on the council after the elections:

Party	2008 election	May 2009	Prior to election	New council
Labour	43	42 (Note: Temple Newsam ward councillor, Jacqueline Langdale, resigned for personal reasons and triggered an April 2009 by-election. The Conservative candidate, former councillor David Schofield, had lost his council seat to Langdale in 2007. In October 2008, the Daily Express had reported Langdale had been involved in an extramarital affair with the 2008 Labour candidate for Temple Newsam, Jeff Coupar. Coupar was also married to Langdale's colleague and Middleton Park councillor Debra Coupar.)	43	48
Conservative	22	23	23	22
Liberal Democrat	24	25 (Note: Kabeer Hussain (Hyde Park and Woodhouse) re-joined the Liberal Democrats in March 2009. He had previously defected to the Labour Party in October 2007, before leaving less than six months later to sit as an independent.)	24 (Note: Hyde Park and Woodhouse councillor Kabeer Hussain died in office on 29 December 2009 and the Labour candidate, former University ward councillor Gerry Harper, won the subsequent February 2010 by-election.)	21
Morley Borough Independent	5	5	5	6
Green	3	3 (Note: Green Party councillor, Luke Russell, resigned and triggered a September 2008 by-election. The party retained his Farnley and Wortley council seat.)	3	2
BNP	1	1	1	0
Independent	1	0	0	0
Total	99	99	99	99
Working majority	-13	-14	-13	-2

== Councillors who did not stand for re-election ==
Councillor/s who did not stand for re-election (6)
Councillor	Ward	First elected	Party	Reason	Successor
John Bale	Guiseley & Rawdon	2004	Conservative	stood down	Pat Latty (Conservative)
Linda Rhodes-Clayton	Hyde Park & Woodhouse	2004	Liberal Democrats	stood down	Javaid Akhtar (Labour)
Debra Coupar	Middleton Park	2003, 2006 (Note: Coupar was later elected as a councillor for Cross Gates and Whinmoor in a 2013 by-election and Temple Newsam in 2016.)	Labour	stood down	Kim Groves (Labour)
Roger Harington	Gipton & Harehills	2002 (Note: Harington was later elected again for Gipton and Harehills in 2012.)	Labour	stood down	Kamila Maqsood (Labour)
Frank Robinson	Calverley & Farsley	1998	Conservative	stood down	Rod Wood (Conservative)
Alec Shelbrooke	Harewood	2004	Conservative	stood down	Matthew Robinson (Conservative)

== Ward results ==
Adel & Wharfedale
Party	Candidate	Votes	%	±%
Conservative	Clive Fox*	5,292	43.2	−14.4
Liberal Democrats	Christina Shaw	4,508	36.8	+10.2
Labour	Nigel Gill	1,822	14.9	+5.3
BNP	Doreen Dawson	332	2.7	−0.8
Green	Paul Marchant	291	2.4	−0.3
Majority		784	6.4	−24.6
Turnout		12,245	77.2	+29.6
Conservative hold		Swing	-12.3	

Alwoodley
Party	Candidate	Votes	%	±%
Conservative	Peter Harrand*	6,225	49.4	−7.4
Labour	Rosie Pickard	3,426	27.2	+7.7
Liberal Democrats	Sue Knights	2,207	17.5	+2.9
UKIP	Warren Hendon	343	2.7	−0.8
BNP	Wayne Taylor	246	2.0	−1.2
Alliance for Green Socialism	Brian Jackson	152	1.2	−1.2
Majority		2,799	22.2	−15.2
Turnout		12,599	72.1	+31.4
Conservative hold		Swing	-7.5	

Ardsley & Robin Hood
Party	Candidate	Votes	%	±%
Labour	Lisa Mulherin*	4,437	41.2	+11.4
Conservative	Stewart McArdle	2,671	24.8	+2.0
Liberal Democrats	Katherine Bavage	1,742	16.2	+9.2
BNP	Joanna Beverley	1,490	13.8	−15.7
UKIP	David Daniel	424	3.9	+0.4
Majority		1,766	16.4	+16.2
Turnout		10,764	63.2	+27.7
Labour hold		Swing	+4.7	

Armley
Party	Candidate	Votes	%	±%
Labour	Janet Harper*	4,475	46.2	+3.2
Liberal Democrats	Elizabeth Arnott	2,186	22.5	+12.1
Conservative	Gregory Rodwell	1,478	15.2	−3.4
BNP		921	9.5	−5.9
Green	Robert Simpson	635	6.5	−6.0
Majority		2,289	23.6	−0.7
Turnout		9,695	57.1	+29.1
Labour hold		Swing	-4.4	

Beeston & Holbeck
Party	Candidate	Votes	%	±%
Labour	David Congreve*	3,934	47.4	+5.7
Conservative	Robert Winfield	1,632	19.7	−3.0
Liberal Democrats	Alex Tyson	1,283	15.5	+5.0
BNP	Dean Taylor	902	10.9	−4.2
UKIP	Wilfred Woodhouse	355	4.3	−0.4
Green	Colin Johnston	192	2.3	−3.1
Majority		2,302	27.7	+8.7
Turnout		8,298	57.0	+28.5
Labour hold		Swing	+4.3	

Bramley & Stanningley
Party	Candidate	Votes	%	±%
Labour	Neil Taggart*	3,846	41.0	−1.2
Liberal Democrats	Elizabeth Bee	2,242	23.9	+12.6
Conservative	Philip Smith	1,790	19.1	−3.3
BNP	Sharon Knight	812	8.7	−4.5
UKIP	Jeff Miles	379	4.0	+4.0
Green	Kate Bisson	302	3.2	−2.0
Majority		1,604	17.1	−2.8
Turnout		9,371	56.8	+27.9
Labour hold		Swing	-6.9	

Burmantofts & Richmond Hill
Party	Candidate	Votes	%	±%
Labour	Ron Grahame	3,375	43.8	+13.8
Liberal Democrats	David Hollingsworth*	2,605	33.8	−7.9
BNP	Jason Harland	888	11.5	−9.2
Conservative	Michael Wheeler	640	8.3	+2.9
Green	Peter Exley	191	2.5	+2.5
Majority		770	10.0	−1.8
Turnout		7,699	53.1	+23.7
Labour gain from Liberal Democrats		Swing	+10.8	

Calverley & Farsley
Party	Candidate	Votes	%	±%
Conservative	Rod Wood	4,964	39.8	−20.4
Labour	Andrew Jarosz	4,318	34.6	+16.0
Liberal Democrats	Kate Arbuckle	2,403	19.3	+7.5
BNP	Robert Leary	790	6.3	−3.0
Majority		646	5.2	−36.4
Turnout		12,475	71.2	+34.2
Conservative hold		Swing	-18.2	

Chapel Allerton
Party	Candidate	Votes	%	±%
Labour	Jane Dowson*	5,796	55.3	+11.1
Liberal Democrats	Adam Slack	2,154	20.6	−1.8
Conservative	Daniel Paterson	1,471	14.0	−0.5
Alliance for Green Socialism	John Frankland	825	7.9	−1.2
BNP	Dean Marshall	230	2.2	−1.0
Majority		3,642	34.8	+13.0
Turnout		10,476	62.9	+31.3
Labour hold		Swing	+6.4	

City & Hunslet
Party	Candidate	Votes	%	±%
Labour	Mohammed Iqbal*	3,879	41.5	−5.3
Liberal Democrats	Jahangir Aziz	2,717	29.1	+15.6
Conservative	Nina Rosen	1,621	17.3	+2.5
BNP	Laura Meeson	638	6.8	−5.2
Green	Melanie Welsh	493	5.3	−0.1
Majority		1,162	12.4	−19.6
Turnout		9,348	49.1	+29.4
Labour hold		Swing	-10.4	

Cross Gates & Whinmoor
Party	Candidate	Votes	%	±%
Labour	Peter Gruen*	4,921	46.1	+9.2
Conservative	Caroline Anderson	2,955	27.7	−7.1
Liberal Democrats	Keith Norman	1,915	17.9	+9.0
BNP	Michael Mee	895	8.4	−6.8
Majority		1,966	18.4	+16.3
Turnout		10,686	62.1	+24.1
Labour hold		Swing	+8.1	

Farnley & Wortley
Party	Candidate	Votes	%	±%
Labour	John Hardy	3,488	33.1	+11.0
Green	Andy Parnham*	2,563	24.3	−20.3
Conservative	Michael Best	1,817	17.2	+2.3
Liberal Democrats	Philip Moore	1,590	15.1	+11.0
BNP	Helen Foster	1,084	10.3	−3.5
Majority		925	8.8	−13.7
Turnout		10,542	58.7	+26.2
Labour gain from Green		Swing	+15.6	

Garforth & Swillington
Party	Candidate	Votes	%	±%
Labour	Thomas Murray*	5,007	43.8	+1.2
Conservative	Ryan Stephenson	3,955	34.6	−4.6
Liberal Democrats	Simon Dowling	1,811	15.8	+8.3
BNP	Graham Misson	668	5.8	−4.8
Majority		1,052	9.2	+5.9
Turnout		11,441	71.8	+27.1
Labour hold		Swing	+2.9	

Gipton & Harehills
Party	Candidate	Votes	%	±%
Labour	Kamila Maqsood	5,179	60.3	+18.0
Liberal Democrats	Tasadaq Hussain	2,105	24.5	−18.3
Conservative	Beatrice Greenwood	642	7.5	+3.9
BNP	Anthony Wall	503	5.9	−0.6
Alliance for Green Socialism	Azar Iqbal	153	1.8	+0.4
Majority		3,074	35.8	+35.3
Turnout		8,582	57.5	+19.3
Labour hold		Swing	+18.1	

Guiseley & Rawdon
Party	Candidate	Votes	%	±%
Conservative	Pat Latty	5,090	40.2	−10.6
Labour	Mike King	3,574	28.2	+3.7
Liberal Democrats	Cindy Cleasby	2,921	23.1	+10.8
BNP	Andrew Gallagher	647	5.1	−1.3
Green	Colin Avison	432	3.4	−1.7
Majority		1,516	12.0	−14.4
Turnout		12,664	72.4	+32.1
Conservative hold		Swing	-7.1	

Harewood
Party	Candidate	Votes	%	±%
Conservative	Matthew Robinson	6,910	59.6	−13.7
Labour	Stuart McKenna	2,038	17.6	+6.7
Liberal Democrats	Richard Pearcey	1,990	17.2	+10.8
BNP	Martin Gibson	382	3.3	−2.3
Green	Patricia Capstick	275	2.4	−0.7
Majority		4,872	42.0	−20.4
Turnout		11,595	78.4	+32.5
Conservative hold		Swing	-10.2	

Headingley
Party	Candidate	Votes	%	±%
Liberal Democrats	Martin Hamilton*	3,993	50.9	+9.7
Labour	Asghar Khan	2,066	26.4	−3.1
Conservative	Andrea Taylor	981	12.5	−0.3
Green	Christopher Foren	710	9.1	−4.8
Alliance for Green Socialism	Declan Normaschild	89	1.1	+0.1
Majority		1,927	24.6	+12.9
Turnout		7,839	53.0	+33.3
Liberal Democrats hold		Swing	+6.4	

Horsforth
Party	Candidate	Votes	%	±%
Liberal Democrats	Brian Cleasby*	5,959	47.9	+2.0
Conservative	Dawn Collins	3,138	25.2	−12.7
Labour	Rebecca Brady	2,356	18.9	+11.1
BNP	Ian Asquith	358	2.9	−1.8
UKIP	Paul Hellyer	326	2.6	+2.6
Green	Andrea Binns	316	2.5	−1.2
Majority		2,821	22.7	+14.8
Turnout		12,453	71.2	+29.3
Liberal Democrats hold		Swing	+7.3	

Hyde Park & Woodhouse
Party	Candidate	Votes	%	±%
Labour	Javaid Akhtar	2,901	39.8	+1.3
Liberal Democrats	Mick Taylor	2,779	38.1	−2.5
Conservative	Yasser Khalid	751	10.3	+2.9
Green	Eliot Hollier	574	7.9	−2.2
Independent	Andrew Coley	155	2.1	+2.1
Independent	Adele Beeson	132	1.8	+1.8
Majority		122	1.7	−0.5
Turnout		7,292	48.8	+28.9
Labour gain from Liberal Democrats		Swing	+1.9	

Killingbeck & Seacroft
Party	Candidate	Votes	%	±%
Labour	Brian Selby*	4,711	54.0	+4.2
Liberal Democrats	Joanne Binns	1,459	16.7	+6.5
Conservative	Billy Flynn	1,450	16.6	+1.8
BNP	Bernard Allen	962	11.0	−3.0
Alliance for Green Socialism	Simon Fearn	147	1.7	−0.7
Majority		3,252	37.3	+2.3
Turnout		8,729	52.8	+21.4
Labour hold		Swing	+1.1	

Kippax & Methley
Party	Candidate	Votes	%	±%
Labour	Keith Wakefield*	5,748	51.3	+0.7
Conservative	Tina Phillips	2,782	24.8	−3.7
Liberal Democrats	Matthew Coleman	1,487	13.3	+4.9
BNP	Shaun Fitzpatrick	624	5.6	−6.9
UKIP	Paul Spivey	571	5.1	+5.1
Majority		2,966	26.5	+4.5
Turnout		11,212	68.9	+31.1
Labour hold		Swing	+2.2	

Kirkstall
Party	Candidate	Votes	%	±%
Labour	Bernard Atha*	4,012	42.4	+3.0
Liberal Democrats	Ruth Coleman	3,125	33.0	−3.6
Conservative	Matthew Wharton	1,420	15.0	+5.2
Green	Morgan Tatchell-Evans	469	5.0	−1.7
BNP	Keven Nicholson	447	4.7	−2.8
Majority		887	9.4	+6.7
Turnout		9,473	60.0	+29.9
Labour hold		Swing	+3.3	

Middleton Park
Party	Candidate	Votes	%	±%
Labour	Kim Groves	4,477	49.2	+10.9
BNP	Kevin Meeson	1,875	20.6	−16.8
Conservative	James McFarland	1,292	14.2	+0.0
Liberal Democrats	Beth Fisher	1,222	13.4	+3.3
Green	James Fell	231	2.5	+2.5
Majority		2,602	28.6	+27.6
Turnout		9,097	50.9	+21.5
Labour hold		Swing	+13.8	

Moortown
Party	Candidate	Votes	%	±%
Labour	Sharon Hamilton	4,362	35.3	+9.5
Liberal Democrats	Richard Harker*	4,247	34.3	−7.0
Conservative	Dan Cohen	3,133	25.3	+1.9
BNP	Leslie Howells	327	2.6	−1.3
Alliance for Green Socialism	Michael Davies	301	2.4	−1.1
Majority		115	0.9	−14.6
Turnout		12,370	72.3	+32.7
Labour gain from Liberal Democrats		Swing	+8.2	

Morley North
Party	Candidate	Votes	%	±%
Morley Borough Independent	Thomas Leadley*	4,063	33.4	−18.3
Labour	David Nagle	2,767	22.7	+9.3
Conservative	Robin Ghosh	2,571	21.1	+9.0
Liberal Democrats	Chris Lovell	1,397	11.5	+8.3
BNP	Tom Redmond	1,378	11.3	−8.3
Majority		1,296	10.6	−21.5
Turnout		12,176	68.2	+28.0
Morley Borough Independent hold		Swing	-13.8	

Morley South
Party	Candidate	Votes	%	±%
Morley Borough Independent	Shirley Varley	2,837	26.7	−17.0
Labour	Rob Wilkinson	2,497	23.5	+10.1
BNP	Chris Beverley*	2,246	21.2	−7.5
Conservative	Andrew Haigh	1,880	17.7	+9.4
Liberal Democrats	Rowena Skinner	1,149	10.8	+7.6
Majority		340	3.2	−11.9
Turnout		10,609	64.2	+26.5
Morley Borough Independent gain from BNP		Swing	-13.5	

Otley & Yeadon
Party	Candidate	Votes	%	±%
Liberal Democrats	Ryk Downes*	5,647	44.9	+6.1
Conservative	Nigel Francis	3,159	25.1	−3.0
Labour	John Eveleigh	3,011	23.9	+1.4
BNP	Geoffrey Bulmer	527	4.2	−0.8
Alliance for Green Socialism	Francis Denning	233	1.9	−0.5
Majority		2,488	19.8	+9.1
Turnout		12,577	72.0	+27.8
Liberal Democrats hold		Swing	+4.5	

Pudsey
Party	Candidate	Votes	%	±%
Labour	Mick Coulson*	4,861	42.3	+3.3
Conservative	Jason Aldiss	3,356	29.2	−5.0
Liberal Democrats	Brendan Stubbs	2,081	18.1	+9.2
BNP	Winifred Misson	901	7.8	−5.4
Green	Irene Dracup	292	2.5	−2.1
Majority		1,505	13.1	+8.3
Turnout		11,491	66.6	+28.8
Labour hold		Swing	+4.1	

Rothwell
Party	Candidate	Votes	%	±%
Liberal Democrats	Stewart Golton*	3,938	37.7	−5.9
Labour	Alec Hudson	3,756	35.9	+2.4
Conservative	Caroline Oldfield	2,018	19.3	+7.2
BNP	Robert Peel	736	7.0	−3.7
Majority		182	1.7	−8.3
Turnout		10,448	67.1	+29.5
Liberal Democrats hold		Swing	-4.1	

Roundhay
Party	Candidate	Votes	%	±%
Labour	Ghulam Hussain	4,769	38.7	+8.5
Conservative	Paul Wadsworth*	4,134	33.6	−13.4
Liberal Democrats	Adam Douglas	2,647	21.5	+10.0
Alliance for Green Socialism	Malcolm Christie	446	3.6	−0.3
BNP	Bernadette Herbert	320	2.6	−0.6
Majority		635	5.2	−11.6
Turnout		12,316	72.3	+30.9
Labour gain from Conservative		Swing	+10.9	

Temple Newsam
Party	Candidate	Votes	%	±%
Labour	Mick Lyons*	4,098	37.6	+8.0
Conservative	Elizabeth Hayes	3,032	27.8	−6.1
Liberal Democrats	Ian Dowling	1,538	14.1	+6.7
Independent	David Gale	1,072	9.8	+2.9
BNP	Ian Gibson	1,041	9.5	−12.6
Alliance for Green Socialism	Gareth Christie	126	1.2	+1.2
Majority		1,066	9.8	+5.5
Turnout		10,907	67.9	+23.9
Labour hold		Swing	+7.0	

Weetwood
Party	Candidate	Votes	%	±%
Liberal Democrats	Judith Chapman*	4,716	43.2	+2.0
Conservative	Matt Baker	2,622	24.0	−5.0
Labour	Carol Hughes	2,537	23.3	+7.1
Green	Martin Hemingway	559	5.1	−0.1
BNP	Peter Askins	287	2.6	−2.5
Independent	Alan Procter	106	1.0	−0.1
Alliance for Green Socialism	Keith Nathan	78	0.7	−1.1
Majority		2,094	19.2	+7.0
Turnout		10,905	64.5	+29.6
Liberal Democrats hold		Swing	+3.5	

Wetherby
Party	Candidate	Votes	%	±%
Conservative	John Procter*	6,115	52.9	−11.7
Labour	Ashley Walsh	2,403	20.8	+4.4
Liberal Democrats	Jonathan Bentley	2,142	18.5	+8.8
UKIP	David Macey	595	5.1	+0.7
BNP	Sam Clayton	302	2.6	−2.2
Majority		3,712	32.1	−16.1
Turnout		11,557	75.0	+32.8
Conservative hold		Swing	-8.0	

== By-elections between 2010 and 2011 ==
Guiseley & Rawdon by-election 14 October 2010 replacing Stuart Andrew (resigned)
Party	Candidate	Votes	%	±%
Conservative	Paul Wadsworth	2,075	45.1	+4.9
Labour	Mike King	1,708	37.1	+8.9
Liberal Democrats	Cindy Cleasby	818	17.8	−5.3
Majority		367	8.0	−4.0
Turnout		4,601	25.0	−47.4
Conservative hold		Swing	-2.0	
