= 2016 Leeds City Council election =

- 5 May 2016

33 of the 99 seats on Leeds City Council 50 seats needed for a majority
- Turnout: 34.7% (▼29.39%)
| | First party | Second party | Third party |
|---|---|---|---|
| Leader | Judith Blake | Andrew Carter |
| Party | Labour | Conservative | Liberal Democrats |
| Last election | 22 seats, 39.8% | 6 seats, 27.4% | 2 seats, 8.4% |
| Seats before | 63 | 19 | 9 |
| Seats won | 21 | 6 | 3 |
| Seats after | 63 | 19 | 9 |
| Seat change | Steady | Steady | Steady |
| Popular vote | 79,442 | 42,465 | 18,525 |
| Percentage | 43.0% | 23.0% | 10.0% |
| Swing | ▲3.2pp | ▼4.4pp | ▲1.6pp |
| | Fourth party | Fifth party | Sixth party |
| Party | Morley Borough Independents | Green | UKIP |
| Last election | 1 seats, 1.9% | 1 seats, 8.9% | 0 seats, 12.9% |
| Seats before | 5 | 3 | 0 |
| Seats won | 2 | 1 | 0 |
| Seats after | 5 | 3 | 0 |
| Seat change | Steady | ▼1 | Steady |
| Popular vote | 5,079 | 13,021 | 23,166 |
| Percentage | 2.8% | 7.1% | 12.5% |
| Swing | ▲0.9pp | ▼1.8pp | ▼0.4pp |
- Labour in red (21), Conservatives in blue (6), Liberal Democrats in yellow (3), Morley Borough Independents in dark green (2) and Greens in light green (1).
Council control before election
Majority administration
Labour
Council control after election
Majority administration
Labour

The 2016 Leeds City Council election took place on Thursday 5 May 2016 to elect members of Leeds City Council in England. It was on the same day as other local elections.

As per the election cycle, one third of the council's seats were up for election. The councillors subsequently elected replaced those elected when their individual seats were previously contested in 2012.

The Labour Party retained all 21 of their contested council seats, maintaining their majority control of the council with a total of 63 of the 99 elected councillors. It was the second election in a row in which no party gained or lost any seats.

== Election summary ==
Leeds City Council Election Result 2016
| Party | Seats | Gains | Losses | Net gain/loss | Seats % | Votes % | Votes | +/− |
|---|---|---|---|---|---|---|---|---|
| Labour | 21 | 0 | 0 | Steady | 63.6 | 43.0 | 79,442 | +3.2 |
| Conservative | 6 | 0 | 0 | Steady | 18.2 | 23.0 | 42,465 | -4.4 |
| UKIP | 0 | 0 | 0 | Steady | 0.0 | 12.5 | 23,166 | -0.4 |
| Liberal Democrats | 3 | 0 | 0 | Steady | 9.1 | 10.0 | 18,525 | +1.6 |
| Green | 1 | 0 | 0 | Steady | 3.0 | 7.1 | 13,021 | -1.8 |
| Morley Borough Independent | 2 | 0 | 0 | Steady | 6.1 | 2.8 | 5,079 | +0.9 |
| Yorkshire First | 0 | 0 | 0 | Steady | 0.0 | 0.6 | 1,063 | +0.6 |
| Independent | 0 | 0 | 0 | Steady | 0.0 | 0.5 | 987 | +0.5 |
| Alliance for Green Socialism | 0 | 0 | 0 | Steady | 0.0 | 0.3 | 541 | ±0.0 |
| TUSC | 0 | 0 | 0 | Steady | 0.0 | 0.2 | 387 | -0.2 |
| 'Total' | 99 | Steady | Steady | Steady | 100.0 | 100.0 | 184,676 | |

This result had the following consequences for the total number of seats on the council after the elections:

| Party | 2015 election | New council |
|---|---|---|
| Labour | 63 | 63 |
| Conservative | 19 | 19 |
| Liberal Democrat | 9 | 9 |
| Morley Borough Independent | 5 | 5 |
| Green | 3 | 3 |
| Total | 99 | 99 |
| Working majority | 27 | 27 |

== Councillors who did not stand for re-election ==
Councillor/s who did not stand for re-election (5)
| Councillor | Ward | First elected | Party | Reason | Successor |
|---|---|---|---|---|---|
| Ann Castle | Harewood | 1988, 2000 | Conservative | stood down | Ryan Stephenson (Conservative) |
| Judith Cummins | Temple Newsam | 2012 | Labour | stood down | Debra Coupar (Labour) |
| Maureen Ingham | Armley | 2012 | Labour | stood down | Denise Ragan (Labour) |
| Andrea McKenna | Garforth & Swillington | 2003 | Labour | stood down | Sarah Field (Labour) |
| Bill Urry | Roundhay | 2012 | Labour | stood down | Eleanor Tunnicliffe (Labour) |

Incumbent Labour councillors, Debra Coupar (Cross Gates & Whinmoor), Roger Harington (Gipton & Harehills) and Janette Walker (Headingley), all stood for new wards. Coupar was elected to represent Temple Newsam and Walker replaced Coupar as a councillor for Cross Gates & Whinmoor. Harington lost to the Liberal Democrats in Weetwood.

== Ward results ==
Adel & Wharfedale
| Party | Candidate | Votes | % | ±% |
|---|---|---|---|---|
| Conservative | Barry Anderson* | 4,125 | 58.4 | +12.3 |
| Labour | Paul Wray | 1,270 | 18.0 | −0.6 |
| Liberal Democrats | Cheryl Kebede | 948 | 13.4 | −8.4 |
| UKIP | Glenn Morley | 440 | 6.2 | −1.5 |
| Green | Emma Louise Carter | 281 | 4.0 | −1.8 |
| Majority | | 2,855 | 40.4 | +16.0 |
| Turnout | | 7,064 | 45.5 | |
| Conservative hold | | Swing | | |

Alwoodley
| Party | Candidate | Votes | % | ±% |
|---|---|---|---|---|
| Conservative | Neil Buckley* | 3,443 | 52.1 | +0.7 |
| Labour | Keith White | 1,982 | 30.0 | −1.0 |
| UKIP | Warren Hendon | 534 | 8.1 | +0.6 |
| Liberal Democrats | Roderic Parker | 348 | 5.3 | −0.2 |
| Green | Miriam Moss | 223 | 3.4 | +0.3 |
| Alliance for Green Socialism | Brian Jackson | 83 | 1.3 | +0.5 |
| Majority | | 1,461 | 22.1 | +1.7 |
| Turnout | | 6,613 | 38.1 | |
| Conservative hold | | Swing | | |

Ardsley & Robin Hood
| Party | Candidate | Votes | % | ±% |
|---|---|---|---|---|
| Labour | Karen Renshaw* | 2,248 | 46.1 | +6.6 |
| Conservative | Tim Atkin | 1,161 | 23.8 | −9.1 |
| UKIP | Lindon Dove | 1,096 | 22.5 | +2.0 |
| Liberal Democrats | Benjamin Lloyd Ward | 225 | 4.6 | +1.2 |
| Green | Lyssie Page | 143 | 2.9 | +0.8 |
| Majority | | 1,087 | 22.3 | +15.7 |
| Turnout | | 4,873 | 28.5 | |
| Labour hold | | Swing | | |

Armley
| Party | Candidate | Votes | % | ±% |
|---|---|---|---|---|
| Labour | Alison Lowe* | 2,726 | 55.7 | +7.4 |
| UKIP | David Caldwell | 1,104 | 22.6 | +1.3 |
| Green | David Michael Smith | 453 | 9.3 | −2.3 |
| Conservative | Shane Morgan | 380 | 7.8 | +4.9 |
| Liberal Democrats | Christine Glover | 181 | 3.7 | −0.3 |
| TUSC | Beth Sutcliffe | 47 | 1.0 | −0.1 |
| Majority | | 1,622 | 33.1 | +6.2 |
| Turnout | | 4,891 | 29.1 | |
| Labour hold | | Swing | | |

Beeston & Holbeck
| Party | Candidate | Votes | % | ±% |
|---|---|---|---|---|
| Labour | Angela Gabriel* | 2,547 | 61.4 | +8.3 |
| UKIP | Luke Senior | 833 | 20.1 | −2.9 |
| Conservative | Robert Winfield | 429 | 10.3 | −3.9 |
| Green | Adam Dent | 232 | 5.6 | −0.3 |
| Liberal Democrats | Kathryn Gagen | 84 | 2.0 | −0.4 |
| TUSC | Kevin Pattison | 26 | 0.6 | −0.9 |
| Majority | | 1,714 | 40.3 | +10.2 |
| Turnout | | 4,151 | 28.3 | |
| Labour hold | | Swing | | |

Bramley & Stanningley
| Party | Candidate | Votes | % | ±% |
|---|---|---|---|---|
| Labour | Caroline Gruen* | 2,370 | 51.2 | +5.4 |
| UKIP | Anne Murgatroyd | 1,152 | 24.9 | +2.3 |
| Conservative | Alex Nancolas | 484 | 10.5 | +7.8 |
| Green | Kate Bisson | 453 | 9.8 | −1.3 |
| Liberal Democrats | Serena Glover | 171 | 3.7 | +0.5 |
| Majority | | 1,218 | 26.3 | +3.1 |
| Turnout | | 4,630 | 29.2 | |
| Labour hold | | Swing | | |

Burmantofts & Richmond Hill
| Party | Candidate | Votes | % | ±% |
|---|---|---|---|---|
| Labour | Denise Ragan | 2,279 | 57.4 | +3.6 |
| UKIP | Geoff Holloran | 766 | 19.3 | −1.4 |
| Liberal Democrats | David Hollingsworth | 464 | 11.7 | +2.3 |
| Green | Penny Gilg | 223 | 5.6 | +0.5 |
| Conservative | Peter Lord | 189 | 4.8 | +4.3 |
| TUSC | James Ellis | 47 | 1.2 | +0.7 |
| Majority | | 1,513 | 38.1 | +5.0 |
| Turnout | | 3,968 | 27.2 | |
| Labour hold | | Swing | | |

Calverley & Farsley
| Party | Candidate | Votes | % | ±% |
|---|---|---|---|---|
| Conservative | Andrew Carter* | 3,674 | 52.9 | +5.9 |
| Labour | Peter Carlill | 2,269 | 32.7 | +3.7 |
| UKIP | Malcolm Steele | 596 | 8.6 | −0.2 |
| Liberal Democrats | Kate Arbuckle | 249 | 3.6 | +0.2 |
| Green | Clive Lord | 161 | 2.3 | +2.1 |
| Majority | | 1,405 | 20.2 | +9.6 |
| Turnout | | 6,949 | 39.6 | |
| Conservative hold | | Swing | | |

Chapel Allerton
| Party | Candidate | Votes | % | ±% |
|---|---|---|---|---|
| Labour | Eileen Taylor* | 4,169 | 69.5 | +11.5 |
| Conservative | David Myers | 541 | 9.0 | +6.2 |
| Green | Keith Mollison | 464 | 7.7 | +6.4 |
| UKIP | Sheila Valerie Store | 290 | 4.8 | +4.8 |
| Liberal Democrats | Darren Finlay | 275 | 4.6 | +3.3 |
| Alliance for Green Socialism | Mike Davies | 262 | 4.4 | −0.6 |
| Majority | | 3,628 | 60.5 | +17.7 |
| Turnout | | 6,001 | 36.0 | |
| Labour hold | | Swing | | |

City & Hunslet
| Party | Candidate | Votes | % | ±% |
|---|---|---|---|---|
| Labour | Elizabeth Nash* | 2,483 | 49.1 | +4.2 |
| Green | Ed Carlisle | 1,397 | 27.6 | +4.8 |
| Conservative | Amy Green | 443 | 8.8 | 10.8 |
| UKIP | Brian Weatherill | 425 | 8.4 | +1.5 |
| Liberal Democrats | Jahangir Aziz | 252 | 4.9 | +0 |
| TUSC | Mary Rosamund Finch | 54 | 1.2 | +1.2 |
| Majority | | 1,086 | 21.5 | −0.5 |
| Turnout | | 5,054 | 25.9 | |
| Labour hold | | Swing | | |

Cross Gates & Whinmoor
| Party | Candidate | Votes | % | ±% |
|---|---|---|---|---|
| Labour | Janette Walker | 2,789 | 48.6 | +2.8 |
| UKIP | Mark Maniatt | 1,446 | 25.2 | +3.6 |
| Conservative | Matthew Gale | 1,088 | 18.8 | −5.6 |
| Liberal Democrats | Kate Langwick | 245 | 4.3 | +0.6 |
| Green | Florence Scott | 165 | 3.1 | −1.4 |
| Majority | | 1,343 | 23.4 | +2.0 |
| Turnout | | 5,733 | 32.4 | |
| Labour hold | | Swing | | |

Farnley & Wortley
| Party | Candidate | Votes | % | ±% |
|---|---|---|---|---|
| Green | David Blackburn* | 2,517 | 47.6 | +10.8 |
| Labour | John Hardy | 1,576 | 29.8 | −0.8 |
| UKIP | Tony Roberts | 751 | 14.2 | −4.8 |
| Conservative | Hayley Nancolas | 380 | 7.2 | −3.8 |
| Liberal Democrats | Rob Jacques | 60 | 1.2 | −0.8 |
| Majority | | 941 | 17.8 | +11.7 |
| Turnout | | 5,284 | 30.4 | |
| Green hold | | Swing | | |

Garforth & Swillington
| Party | Candidate | Votes | % | ±% |
|---|---|---|---|---|
| Labour | Sarah Field | 3,582 | 55.2 | −2.0 |
| Conservative | Daniel Farrell | 1,726 | 26.6 | −0.1 |
| UKIP | Terry Harkin | 862 | 13.3 | +2.3 |
| Green | Kieran White | 175 | 2.7 | −0.1 |
| Liberal Democrats | Mitchell Galdas | 147 | 2.3 | +0 |
| Majority | | 1,856 | 28.6 | −4.0 |
| Turnout | | 6,492 | 40.6 | |
| Labour hold | | Swing | | |

Gipton & Harehills
| Party | Candidate | Votes | % | ±% |
|---|---|---|---|---|
| Labour | Salma Arif | 3,972 | 79.0 | +5.1 |
| UKIP | Khalil Kungulilo | 360 | 7.2 | −3.6 |
| Conservative | Beatrice Greenwood | 263 | 5.2 | −1.4 |
| Liberal Democrats | Margaret Tait | 245 | 4.9 | +0.0 |
| Green | Rhian Williams | 130 | 2.6 | −1.2 |
| TUSC | Tanis Belsham-Wray | 60 | 1.2 | +1.2 |
| Majority | | 3,612 | 71.8 | +8.7 |
| Turnout | | 5,030 | 32.6 | |
| Labour hold | | Swing | | |

Guiseley & Rawdon
| Party | Candidate | Votes | % | ±% |
|---|---|---|---|---|
| Conservative | Graham Latty* | 3,177 | 44.0 | −2.6 |
| Labour | David Bowe | 2,114 | 29.3 | −2.0 |
| Yorkshire First | Bob Buxton | 741 | 10.3 | +10.3 |
| UKIP | Lynn Parker | 571 | 7.9 | 3.3 |
| Liberal Democrats | Simon Dowling | 367 | 5.1 | −3.9 |
| Green | Lesley Jeffries | 255 | 3.5 | −2.4 |
| Majority | | 1,063 | 14.7 | −4.6 |
| Turnout | | 7,225 | 40.2 | |
| Conservative hold | | Swing | | |

Harewood
| Party | Candidate | Votes | % | ±% |
|---|---|---|---|---|
| Conservative | Ryan Stephenson | 3,295 | 57.8 | −3.0 |
| Labour | Leo Verity | 946 | 16.6 | −0.8 |
| UKIP | Rosemary O'Dea | 706 | 12.4 | +1.4 |
| Green | David Corry | 382 | 6.7 | +1.4 |
| Liberal Democrats | Sara Howell | 371 | 6.5 | +1.0 |
| Majority | | 2,349 | 41.2 | −2.2 |
| Turnout | | 5,700 | 38.7 | |
| Conservative hold | | Swing | | |

Headingley
| Party | Candidate | Votes | % | ±% |
|---|---|---|---|---|
| Labour | Al Garthwaite | 1,516 | 50.1 | +10.1 |
| Green | Joe Salmon | 705 | 23.7 | −7.9 |
| Liberal Democrats | Penny Goodman | 556 | 18.7 | +6.3 |
| Conservative | Diane Elaine Fox | 113 | 3.8 | −8.6 |
| UKIP | Paul William Thomas Denner | 73 | 2.5 | +0.6 |
| TUSC | Jack Andrew Niddrie | 14 | 0.5 | −0.4 |
| Majority | | 811 | 26.4 | +18.0 |
| Turnout | | 2,922 | 28.2 | |
| Labour hold | | Swing | | |

Horsforth
| Party | Candidate | Votes | % | ±% |
|---|---|---|---|---|
| Liberal Democrats | Chris Townsley* | 2,329 | 32.9 | +13.4 |
| Labour Co-op | Ian McCargo | 1,945 | 27.5 | +3.2 |
| Conservative | Richard John O'Callaghan | 1,923 | 27.2 | −12.9 |
| UKIP | Roger Facer Tattersall | 462 | 6.5 | −1.8 |
| Green | Ben Hall | 421 | 5.9 | −1.0 |
| Majority | | 384 | 5.4 | −10.4 |
| Turnout | | 7,080 | 42.2 | |
| Liberal Democrats hold | | Swing | | |

Hyde Park & Woodhouse
| Party | Candidate | Votes | % | ±% |
|---|---|---|---|---|
| Labour | Christine Towler* | 2,075 | 65.0 | +15.3 |
| Green | Christopher Mark Foren | 509 | 15.9 | −10.4 |
| Conservative | Constance Mary Campbell | 215 | 6.7 | −6.6 |
| UKIP | Joe Murgatroyd | 179 | 5.6 | +1.3 |
| Liberal Democrats | Ian Dowling | 163 | 5.1 | ±0 |
| TUSC | Ben Mayor | 52 | 1.6 | +0.3 |
| Majority | | 1,566 | 49.1 | +25.6 |
| Turnout | | 3,193 | 23.6 | |
| Labour hold | | Swing | | |

Killingbeck & Seacroft
| Party | Candidate | Votes | % | ±% |
|---|---|---|---|---|
| Labour | Graham Hyde* | 2,811 | 62.3 | +7.5 |
| UKIP | Steve Leak | 828 | 18.3 | −5.3 |
| Conservative | Elizabeth Hayes | 431 | 9.5 | −4.6 |
| Liberal Democrats | Adam Douglas | 166 | 3.7 | +0.2 |
| Green | Jaimes Moran | 124 | 2.7 | −1.3 |
| Yorkshire First | John Otley | 111 | 2.5 | +2.5 |
| TUSC | Iain Alaistair Dalton | 44 | 1.0 | +1.0 |
| Majority | | 1983 | 44.0 | +12.8 |
| Turnout | | 4,515 | 27.8 | |
| Labour hold | | Swing | | |

Kippax & Methley
| Party | Candidate | Votes | % | ±% |
|---|---|---|---|---|
| Labour | Mary Harland* | 3,122 | 55.8 | +6.3 |
| UKIP | Paul Spivey | 1,138 | 20.3 | +3.3 |
| Conservative | Ines Newell | 978 | 17.5 | 7.8 |
| Liberal Democrats | Elizabeth Hindley | 181 | 3.2 | +0.2 |
| Green | Stephen Paul Terry | 180 | 3.2 | −2.0 |
| Majority | | 1,984 | 35.5 | +11.2 |
| Turnout | | 5,599 | 35.0 | |
| Labour hold | | Swing | | |

Kirkstall
| Party | Candidate | Votes | % | ±% |
|---|---|---|---|---|
| Labour | Lucinda Yeadon* | 3,453 | 68.5 | +16.8 |
| UKIP | Cain Weber | 547 | 10.9 | +0.3 |
| Green | Morgan Tatchell-Evans | 420 | 8.3 | −10.0 |
| Conservative | George Rear | 313 | 6.2 | −6.1 |
| Liberal Democrats | Martin Hughes | 212 | 4.2 | −1.5 |
| Independent | Stuart William Long | 53 | 1.1 | +1.1 |
| TUSC | Maddy Steeds | 43 | 0.9 | −0.5 |
| Majority | | 5,040 | 57.6 | +24.2 |
| Turnout | | 5041 | 34.5 | |
| Labour hold | | Swing | | |

Middleton Park
| Party | Candidate | Votes | % | ±% |
|---|---|---|---|---|
| Labour | Paul Truswell* | 2,285 | 48.9 | −1.3 |
| UKIP | Craig Sweaton | 1,278 | 27.4 | −2.7 |
| Independent | Wayne Dixon | 605 | 13.0 | +13.0 |
| Conservative | Hugh Findlay | 300 | 6.4 | −5.9 |
| Green | Fiona Love | 104 | 2.2 | −0.7 |
| Liberal Democrats | Sadie Fisher | 99 | 2.1 | −0.3 |
| Majority | | 1007 | 21.6 | −0.5 |
| Turnout | | 4,671 | 25.3 | +4.2 |
| Labour hold | | Swing | | |

Moortown
| Party | Candidate | Votes | % | ±% |
|---|---|---|---|---|
| Labour Co-op | Alex Sobel* | 3,517 | 53.5 | +8.8 |
| Conservative | Mark Dodsworth | 1,349 | 20.5 | −7.4 |
| Liberal Democrats | Chris Howley | 692 | 10.5 | +0.6 |
| UKIP | Harvey Alexander | 565 | 8.3 | +0.4 |
| Green | Tim Goodall | 455 | 6.7 | +1.2 |
| Majority | | 2,168 | 33.0 | +16.2 |
| Turnout | | 6,578 | 38.7 | |
| Labour hold | | Swing | | |

Morley North
| Party | Candidate | Votes | % | ±% |
|---|---|---|---|---|
| Morley Borough Independent | Robert Finnigan* | 2,891 | 50.6 | +13.3 |
| Labour | Andrew Scopes | 1,245 | 21.8 | −0.1 |
| Conservative | Jason Aldiss | 816 | 14.3 | −7.5 |
| UKIP | Peter Morgan | 537 | 9.4 | +3.6 |
| Green | Mickayla Ireland | 122 | 2.1 | −1.0 |
| Liberal Democrats | Peter Andrews | 108 | 1.9 | −0.4 |
| Majority | | 1,646 | 28.8 | +13.4 |
| Turnout | | 5,719 | 32.8 | |
| Morley Borough Independent hold | | Swing | | |

Morley South
| Party | Candidate | Votes | % | ±% |
|---|---|---|---|---|
| Morley Borough Independent | Judith Elliott* | 2,188 | 43.2 | +18.0 |
| Labour | Sarah Keig | 1,445 | 28.5 | +2.0 |
| UKIP | David Michael Kent | 687 | 13.6 | −3.3 |
| Conservative | Jane Eastwood | 547 | 10.8 | +10.0 |
| Green | Christopher James Bell | 145 | 2.9 | −0.8 |
| Liberal Democrats | Aqila Choudhry | 55 | 1.1 | −0.9 |
| Majority | | 743 | 14.7 | +9.3 |
| Turnout | | 5.067 | 30.8 | |
| Morley Borough Independent hold | | Swing | | |

Otley & Yeadon
| Party | Candidate | Votes | % | ±% |
|---|---|---|---|---|
| Liberal Democrats | Sandy Lay* | 3,737 | 48.1 | +12.6 |
| Labour | Nik Rutherford | 1,825 | 23.5 | −2.6 |
| Conservative | Jonathon David Taylor | 702 | 9.0 | −9.0 |
| UKIP | Tom Hollings | 675 | 8.7 | −2.7 |
| Green | Mick Bradley | 501 | 6.5 | −2.5 |
| Independent | Jackie Brown | 323 | 4.1 | +4.1 |
| Majority | | 1,912 | 24.6 | +15.2 |
| Turnout | | 7,763 | 45.1 | |
| Liberal Democrats hold | | Swing | | |

Pudsey
| Party | Candidate | Votes | % | ±% |
|---|---|---|---|---|
| Labour Co-op | Josie Jarosz* | 2,884 | 45.4 | +3.8 |
| Conservative | Simon Seary | 2,120 | 33.3 | −2.6 |
| UKIP | Kath Tattersall | 751 | 11.8 | −1.8 |
| Green | Laura Rosemary Johnson | 220 | 3.5 | −1.8 |
| Yorkshire First | Conor Andrew O'Neill | 211 | 3.3 | +3.3 |
| Liberal Democrats | Jude Patrick Arbuckle | 167 | 2.6 | −0.4 |
| Majority | | 764 | 12.3 | +6.7 |
| Turnout | | 6,353 | 36.9 | |
| Labour hold | | Swing | | |

Rothwell
| Party | Candidate | Votes | % | ±% |
|---|---|---|---|---|
| Labour | David Nagle* | 2,026 | 36.1 | −2.5 |
| Liberal Democrats | Carmel Harrison | 1,728 | 30.1 | +10.5 |
| Conservative | Steve Ellis | 912 | 16.2 | −8.7 |
| UKIP | David Daniel | 750 | 13.3 | ±0 |
| Green | Emma Dobson | 203 | 3.6 | −0.1 |
| Majority | | 298 | 6.0 | −7.7 |
| Turnout | | 5,619 | 36.4 | |
| Labour hold | | Swing | | |

Roundhay
| Party | Candidate | Votes | % | ±% |
|---|---|---|---|---|
| Labour | Eleanor Tunnicliffe | 4,161 | 57.7 | +8.1 |
| Conservative | Michael Lowry | 1,584 | 22.0 | −6.1 |
| Green | Paul Charles Ellis | 461 | 6.4 | +1.8 |
| Liberal Democrats | Najeeb Iqbal | 417 | 5.8 | +0.2 |
| UKIP | Steven Leslie Benjamin Bell | 395 | 5.5 | +0.7 |
| Alliance for Green Socialism | Malcolm Christie | 196 | 2.7 | +0.5 |
| Majority | | 2,577 | 35.7 | +14.3 |
| Turnout | | 7,214 | 41.8 | |
| Labour hold | | Swing | | |

Temple Newsam
| Party | Candidate | Votes | % | ±% |
|---|---|---|---|---|
| Labour | Debra Coupar | 2,690 | 46.6 | +3.7 |
| Conservative | David Schofield | 1,430 | 24.8 | −4.4 |
| UKIP | Phil Moore | 1,259 | 21.8 | +1.8 |
| Liberal Democrats | Keith Norman | 216 | 3.7 | −0.3 |
| Green | Sarah Ann Crossland | 179 | 3.1 | −0.7 |
| Majority | | 1,260 | 21.8 | +8.1 |
| Turnout | | 5,774 | 36.0 | |
| Labour hold | | Swing | | |

Weetwood
| Party | Candidate | Votes | % | ±% |
|---|---|---|---|---|
| Liberal Democrats | Jonathan Bentley* | 2,701 | 44.3 | +9.0 |
| Labour | Roger Harington | 1,982 | 32.5 | +5.5 |
| Conservative | Angelo Basu | 597 | 9.8 | −6.9 |
| Green | Martin Hemingway | 415 | 6.8 | −6.2 |
| UKIP | Mike Cullen | 398 | 6.5 | −1.0 |
| Majority | | 719 | 11.8 | +3.5 |
| Turnout | | 6,093 | 41.3 | |
| Liberal Democrats hold | | Swing | | |

Wetherby
| Party | Candidate | Votes | % | ±% |
|---|---|---|---|---|
| Conservative | Gerald Wilkinson* | 3,387 | 58.3 | −0.1 |
| Labour | Adam Ferhani | 1,141 | 19.6 | −1.6 |
| UKIP | Tina Smith | 712 | 12.3 | +3.2 |
| Liberal Democrats | Christine Golton | 366 | 6.3 | +0.3 |
| Green | Vasco Santos | 203 | 3.5 | −1.8 |
| Majority | | 2,246 | 38.7 | +1.6 |
| Turnout | | 5,809 | 37.5 | |
| Conservative hold | | Swing | | |
