= Roundhay (ward) =

Electoral ward in Leeds, England

- Roundhay highlighted within Leeds
- Population: 17,684 (2023 electorate)
- Metropolitan borough: City of Leeds
- Metropolitan county: West Yorkshire
- Region: Yorkshire and the Humber
- Country: England
- Sovereign state: United Kingdom
- UK Parliament: Leeds North East
- Councillors: Jordan Bowden (Labour); Kathleen Johnstone (Labour); Lisa Martin (Labour)

Roundhay is an electoral ward of Leeds City Council in north east Leeds, West Yorkshire, covering the suburb of the same name, Gledhow and Oakwood.

The ward's boundaries run the A6120 Leeds Outer Ring Road to the north and the A58 Wetherby Road to the south and east. The boundary also follows Gledhow Valley Road to the west before heading north-east to the A6120.

== Councillors since 1980 ==
Election	Councillor	Councillor	Councillor
1980	Patrick Crotty OBE (Con) (Note: Crotty was previously a councillor for Harehills ward between 1949 and 1954 and again from 1959 until then serving Harehills and Roundhay ward from 1973 to 1980. He was awarded an OBE in 1972.)	J. Challenor (Con) (Note: Challenor was previously a councillor for the Roundhay ward from 1970 and then Harehills and Roundhay ward from 1973 to 1980.)	Peggy White CBE (Con) (Note: White was previously a councillor for Whinmoor ward from 1968 to 1972 and then Harehills and Roundhay ward from 1973 to 1980. She was awarded a CBE in 1978.)
1982	Patrick Crotty OBE (Con)	J. Challenor (Con)	Peggy White CBE (Con)
1983	Patrick Crotty OBE KCSG (Con) (Note: Crotty was created a Knight Commander of the Order of St Gregory the Great (KCSG) by the Holy See in 1982.)	Peter Gruen (Con)	Peggy White CBE (Con)
1984	Patrick Crotty OBE KCSG (Con)	Peter Gruen (Con)	Peggy White CBE (Con)
1986	Patrick Crotty OBE KCSG (Con)	Peter Gruen (Con)	Peggy White CBE (Con)
1987	Patrick Crotty OBE KCSG (Con)	Peter Gruen (Con)	Peggy White CBE (Con)
1988	Patrick Crotty OBE KCSG (Con)	Peter Gruen (Con)	Peggy White CBE (Con)
1990	Patrick Crotty OBE KCSG (Con)	Peter Gruen (Con)	Peggy White CBE (Con)
1991	Patrick Crotty OBE KCSG (Con)	Peter Gruen (Con)	Peggy White CBE (Con)
1992	Patrick Crotty OBE KCSG (Con)	Peter Gruen (Con)	Peggy White CBE (Con)
1994	Patrick Crotty OBE KCSG (Con) (Note: Paddy Crotty died in office in January 1995.)	Peter Gruen (Con) (Note: Gruen stepped down at the next election in 1995 and, after leaving the Conservatives to join Labour, was elected for Whinmoor ward in an August 1997 by-election. He currently serves as a Cross Gates and Whinmoor ward councillor.)	Peggy White CBE (Con)
1995	Jean White (Lab)	Doreen Lewis (Lab)	Peggy White CBE (Con)
1996	Jean White (Lab)	Doreen Lewis (Lab)	Peggy White CBE (Con)
1998	Jean White (Lab)	Doreen Lewis (Lab)	Peter Harrand (Con) (Note: Harrand had previously been a councillor for North ward from 1990 until losing his seat in 1996.)
1999	Jean White (Lab)	Michael Fox (Lab)	Peter Harrand (Con)
2000	Ann Castle (Con) (Note: Castle had previously been a councillor for Weetwood ward from 1988 until losing her seat in 1996.)	Michael Fox (Lab)	Peter Harrand (Con)
2002	Ann Castle (Con)	Michael Fox (Lab)	Peter Harrand (Con)
2003	Ann Castle (Con) (Note: Castle stood successfully for Harewood ward at the next election in 2004.)	Matthew Lobley (Con)	Peter Harrand (Con) (Note: Harrand stood successfully for Alwoodley ward at the next election in 2004.)
2004	Valerie Kendall (Con)	Matthew Lobley (Con)	Paul Wadsworth (Con)
2006	Valerie Kendall (Con)	Matthew Lobley (Con)	Paul Wadsworth (Con)
2007	Valerie Kendall (Con)	Matthew Lobley (Con)	Paul Wadsworth (Con)
2008	Valerie Kendall (Con)	Matthew Lobley (Con)	Paul Wadsworth (Con) (Note: Wadsworth lost his seat at the next election in 2010 and then won the October 2010 by-election to fill the vacancy for Guiseley and Rawdon ward following the resignation of Stuart Andrew.)
2010	Valerie Kendall (Con) (Note: Kendall lost her seat at the next election in 2011 and is now an Eden District Councillor.)	Matthew Lobley (Con)	Ghulam Hussain (Lab)
2011	Christine MacNiven (Lab)	Matthew Lobley (Con)	Ghulam Hussain (Lab)
2012	Christine MacNiven (Lab)	Bill Urry (Lab)	Ghulam Hussain (Lab)
2014	Christine MacNiven (Lab)	Bill Urry (Lab)	Ghulam Hussain (Lab)
2015	Christine MacNiven (Lab)	Bill Urry (Lab)	Ghulam Hussain (Lab)
2016	Christine MacNiven (Lab)	Eleanor Tunnicliffe (Lab)	Ghulam Hussain (Lab)
2018	Angela Wenham (Lab)	Eleanor Tunnicliffe (Lab)	Jacob Goddard (Lab)
2019	Angela Wenham (Lab) (Note: The Yorkshire Evening Post reported both Eleanor Tunnicliffe and Angela Wenham resigned from their offices "over the weekend" of 20 and 21 March 2021. Tunnicliffe's term was due to expire in 2022, whereas Wenham resigned prior to the expiry of her term at the 2021 council election. In October 2019, Zara Hussain had previously been selected over Wenham by the Leeds North East Constituency Labour Party and Wenham was also unable to recontest her seat as the Labour candidate in 2021.)	Eleanor Tunnicliffe (Lab)	Jacob Goddard (Lab)
2021	Lisa Martin (Lab)	Zara Hussain (Lab)	Jacob Goddard (Lab)
2022	Lisa Martin (Lab)	Zara Hussain (Lab)	Jordan Bowden (Lab)
2023	Lisa Martin (Lab)	Zara Hussain (Lab)	Jordan Bowden (Lab)
2024	Lisa Martin (Lab)	Zara Hussain (Lab)	Jordan Bowden (Lab)
September 2025	Lisa Martin (Lab)	Zara Hussain (Ind) (Note: From September 2025, Hussain sat as an independent councillor.)	Jordan Bowden (Lab)
2026	Lisa Martin* (Lab)	Kathleen Johnstone* (Lab)	Jordan Bowden* (Lab)

indicates seat up for re-election. indicates seat up for election following resignation or death of sitting councillor. indicates change of party allegiance. * indicates incumbent councillor.

== Elections since 2010 ==
=== May 2026 ===
2026
Party	Candidate	Votes	%	±%
Labour	Kathleen Johnstone	3,316	38.1	▼17.3
Green	Brannoc Stevenson	3,242	37.3	▲10.6
Conservative	Rachel Lynda Cohen	918	10.6	▼0.9
Reform	Steven Michael Robinson	851	9.8	New
Liberal Democrats	Najeeb Iqbal	316	3.6	▼1.1
SDP	Carl Clements Richman	56	0.6	▼1.2
Turnout			50.2	
Rejected ballots		23		
Registered electors		17,405		
Labour gain from Independent		Swing		

=== May 2024 ===
2024
Party	Candidate	Votes	%	±%
Labour	Lisa Martin*	4,040	55.4	−0.3
Green	Alan Anthoney	1,946	26.7	+4.8
Conservative	Shazar Ahad	840	11.5	−3.2
Liberal Democrats	Najeeb Iqbal	340	4.7	−2.4
SDP	Carl Richman	132	1.8	New
Majority		2,094	28.7	−5.1
Turnout		7,349	42.0	+3.9
Labour hold		Swing	-2.6	

=== May 2023 ===
2023
Party	Candidate	Votes	%	±%
Labour Co-op	Jordan Bowden*	3,758	55.7	−5.0
Green	Paul Ellis	1,475	21.9	−2.2
Conservative	Shazar Ahad	992	14.7	−6.0
Liberal Democrats	Darren Finlay	482	7.1	−6.6
Majority		2,283	33.9	−2.8
Turnout		6,742	38.1	−1.1
Labour hold		Swing		

=== May 2022 ===
2022
Party	Candidate	Votes	%	±%
Labour	Zara Hussain*	4,165	60.7	+4.6
Labour	Jordan Bowden	3,898	56.8	−1.4
Green	Paul Ellis	1,650	24.1	+7.7
Conservative	Elayna Cohen	1,418	20.7	−0.5
Conservative	Spencer Weiner	1,261	18.4	−1.5
Liberal Democrats	Jon Hannah	942	13.7	+1.1
Alliance for Green Socialism	Malcolm Christie	400	5.8	+0.9
Majority		2,515	36.7	−0.4
Turnout		6,859	39.2	−8.3
Labour hold		Swing		
Labour hold		Swing		

=== May 2021 ===
2021 (2)
Party	Candidate	Votes	%	±%
Labour	Lisa Martin	4,357	58.2	+14.3
Labour	Zara Hussain	4,198	56.1	+12.2
Conservative	Elayna Cohen	1,583	21.2	+8.5
Conservative	Spencer Weiner	1,486	19.9	+7.2
Green	Richard Miles Wilson	1,225	16.4	+4.7
Liberal Democrats	Tony Quinn	941	12.6	−1.1
Liberal Democrats	Kavi Norris	575	7.7	−0.7
Alliance for Green Socialism	Malcolm Christie	363	4.9	+3.7
SDP	Max Partington	106	1.4	N/A
Freedom Alliance. No Lockdowns. No Curfews.	Darryl Bickler	98	1.3	N/A
SDP	Paul Whetstone	30	0.4	N/A
Majority		2,774	37.1	+6.9
Turnout		7,481	47.5	+7.8
Labour hold		Swing		
Labour hold		Swing		

=== May 2019 ===
2019
Party	Candidate	Votes	%	±%
Labour	Jacob Goddard*	3,021	43.9	−0.4
Independent	Tony Quinn	945	13.7	−0.5
Conservative	Elayna Cohen	876	12.7	−4.8
Green	Paul Ellis	807	11.7	+1.1
Liberal Democrats	Jon Hannah	575	8.4	−1.0
Women's Equality	Hannah Barham-Brown	365	5.3	+5.3
UKIP	Tony Roberts	212	3.0	+3.0
Alliance for Green Socialism	Malcolm Christie	80	1.2	−2.9
Majority		2,076	30.2	−2.2
Turnout		6,900	39.7	−5.4
Labour hold		Swing	-0.1	

=== May 2018 ===
2018
Party	Candidate	Votes	%	±%
Labour	Eleanor Tunnicliffe*	4,203	44.3	−13.4
Labour	Angela Wenham	4,165		
Labour	Jacob Goddard	4,131		
Conservative	Elayna Cohen	1,661	17.5	−4.5
Conservative	Farzana Arif	1,612		
Independent	Tony Quinn	1,348	14.2	N/A
Conservative	Aftab Khan	1,318		
Green	Paul Ellis	1,007	10.6	+4.2
Liberal Democrats	Jon Hannah	888	9.4	+3.6
Liberal Democrats	Rory Mason	621		
Liberal Democrats	Najeeb Iqbal	598		
Alliance for Green Socialism	Malcolm Christie	390	4.1	+1.4
Majority		2,542	32.4	−3.3
Turnout		7,849	45.1	+3.3
Labour hold		Swing		
Labour hold		Swing		
Labour hold		Swing		

=== May 2016 ===
2016
Party	Candidate	Votes	%	±%
Labour	Eleanor Tunnicliffe	4,161	57.7	+8.1
Conservative	Michael Lowry	1,584	22.0	−6.1
Green	Paul Ellis	461	6.4	+1.8
Liberal Democrats	Najeeb Iqbal	417	5.8	+0.2
UKIP	Steven Leslie Benjamin Bell	395	5.5	+0.7
Alliance for Green Socialism	Malcolm Christie	196	2.7	+0.5
Majority		2,577	35.7	+14.3
Turnout		7,214	41.8	
Labour hold		Swing		

=== May 2015 ===
2015
Party	Candidate	Votes	%	±%
Labour	Christine MacNiven*	6,178	49.6	−0.7
Conservative	Andy Paraskos	3,506	28.1	−5.2
Green	Paul Ellis	1,021	8.2	+1.5
UKIP	Warren Hendon	773	6.2	+6.2
Liberal Democrats	Najeeb Iqbal	702	5.6	−1.1
Alliance for Green Socialism	Malcolm Christie	277	2.2	−1.0
Majority		2,672	21.4	+4.4
Turnout		12,457	71.5	
Labour hold		Swing	+2.3	

=== May 2014 ===
2014
Party	Candidate	Votes	%	±%
Labour	Ghulam Hussain*	3,229		
Conservative	Andy Paraskos	1,952		
Liberal Democrats	Richard Whelan	528		
Green	Paul Ellis	820		
Alliance for Green Socialism	Malcolm Christie	355		
Majority		1,277		
Turnout			40.96	
Labour hold		Swing		

=== May 2012 ===
2012
Party	Candidate	Votes	%	±%
Labour	Bill Urry	3,556	52.4	+2.2
Conservative	Andy Paraskos	1,965	29.0	−4.3
Liberal Democrats	Michael Hurley	487	7.2	+0.4
Green	Paul Ellis	486	7.2	+0.6
Alliance for Green Socialism	Malcolm Scott	288	4.2	+1.1
Majority		1,591	23.5	+6.5
Turnout		6,782		
Labour gain from Conservative		Swing	+3.2	

=== May 2011 ===
2011
Party	Candidate	Votes	%	±%
Labour	Christine MacNiven	4,307	50.3	+11.6
Conservative	Valerie Kendall*	2,850	33.3	−0.3
Liberal Democrats	Adam Douglas	578	6.7	−14.7
Green	Paul Ellis	559	6.5	+6.5
Alliance for Green Socialism	Malcolm Scott	273	3.2	−0.4
Majority		1,457	17.0	+11.8
Turnout		8,567	49	
Labour gain from Conservative		Swing	+5.9	

=== May 2010 ===
2010
Party	Candidate	Votes	%	±%
Labour	Ghulam Hussain	4,769	38.7	+8.5
Conservative	Paul Wadsworth*	4,134	33.6	−13.4
Liberal Democrats	Adam Douglas	2,647	21.5	+10.0
Alliance for Green Socialism	Malcolm Christie	446	3.6	−0.3
BNP	Bernadette Herbert	320	2.6	−0.6
Majority		635	5.2	−11.6
Turnout		12,316	72.3	+30.9
Labour gain from Conservative		Swing	+10.9	

== See also ==
- Listed buildings in Leeds (Roundhay Ward)
