= Burmantofts and Richmond Hill (ward) =

Electoral ward in Leeds, England

- Burmantofts and Richmond Hill highlighted within Leeds
- Population: 17,023 (2023 electorate)
- Metropolitan borough: City of Leeds
- Metropolitan county: West Yorkshire
- Region: Yorkshire and the Humber
- Country: England
- Sovereign state: United Kingdom
- UK Parliament: Leeds South
- Councillors: Luke Farley (Labour); Asghar Khan (Labour); Nkele Manaka (Labour)

Burmantofts and Richmond Hill is an electoral ward of Leeds City Council in east Leeds, West Yorkshire, covering the former industrial and now largely residential areas of Burmantofts and Richmond Hill.

== Councillors ==
Election	Councillor	Councillor	Councillor
2004	Ralph Pryke (LD) (Note: Pryke had served as a councillor for Burmantofts ward for a year since 2003.)	Richard Brett (LD)	David Hollingsworth (LD)
2006	Ralph Pryke (LD)	Richard Brett (LD)	David Hollingsworth (LD)
2007	Ralph Pryke (LD)	Richard Brett (LD)	David Hollingsworth (LD)
2008	Ralph Pryke (LD)	Richard Brett (LD)	David Hollingsworth (LD)
2010	Ralph Pryke (LD)	Richard Brett (LD)	Ronald Grahame (Lab) (Note: Grahame (né Blower) served as a ward councillor for Whinmoor ward from 1982, then Burmantofts ward between 1991 and not being elected for the new seat of Burmantofts and Richmond Hill in 2004.)
2011	Ralph Pryke (LD)	Asghar Khan (Lab)	Ronald Grahame (Lab)
2012	Maureen Ingham (Lab)	Asghar Khan (Lab)	Ronald Grahame (Lab)
2014	Maureen Ingham (Lab)	Asghar Khan (Lab)	Ronald Grahame (Lab)
2015	Maureen Ingham (Lab)	Asghar Khan (Lab)	Ronald Grahame (Lab)
2016	Denise Ragan (Lab)	Asghar Khan (Lab)	Ronald Grahame (Lab)
2018	Denise Ragan (Lab)	Asghar Khan (Lab)	Ronald Grahame (Lab)
2019	Denise Ragan (Lab)	Asghar Khan (Lab)	Ronald Grahame (Lab)
December 2020	Denise Ragan (Lab)	Asghar Khan (Lab)	Ronald Grahame (Ind) (Note: Grahame was charged with historic child sex offences and "suspended from the Labour party pending the outcome of the case.")
2021	Denise Ragan (Lab)	Asghar Khan (Lab)	Ronald Grahame (Ind)
2022	Denise Ragan (Lab)	Asghar Khan (Lab)	Luke Farley (Lab)
2023	Nkele Manaka (Lab)	Asghar Khan (Lab)	Luke Farley (Lab)
2024	Nkele Manaka (Lab)	Asghar Khan (Lab)	Luke Farley (Lab)
2026	Nkele Manaka* (Lab)	Asghar Khan* (Lab)	Luke Farley* (Lab)

indicates seat up for re-election. indicates councillor defection or change in party affiliation. * indicates incumbent councillor.

== Elections since 2010 ==
=== May 2026 ===
2026
Party	Candidate	Votes	%	±%
Labour	Luke Anthony Farley	1,957	39.2	▼26.3
Reform	Leo Doherty	1,393	27.9	New
Green	Shahab Saqib Adris	1,123	22.5	▲13.9
Liberal Democrats	David Ewan Hollingsworth	252	5.0	▼2.5
Conservative	Zoe Metcalfe	183	3.7	▼4.1
TUSC	Richard Chaves-Sanderson	34	0.7	▼1.2
SDP	Daniel Paul Whetstone	19	0.4	▼0.3
Majority		564	11.3	▼45.6
Turnout		4,974	29.9	▲5.0
Rejected ballots		13	0.3	
Registered electors		16,628		
Labour hold		Swing	▼27.1	

=== May 2024 ===
2024
Party	Candidate	Votes	%	±%
Labour Co-op	Asghar Khan*	2,752	65.5	−1.3
Green	Robert Wolff	363	8.6	−2.2
Yorkshire	Rob Lees	329	7.8	New
Conservative	Taiwo Adeyemi	328	7.8	+0.1
Liberal Democrats	David Hollingsworth	317	7.5	−2.8
TUSC	Richard Chaves-Sanderson	81	1.9	−0.4
SDP	Paul Whetstone	30	0.7	−0.8
Majority		2,389	56.9	+0.8
Turnout		4,231	24.9	+2.5
Labour hold		Swing	+0.5	

=== May 2023 ===
2023
Party	Candidate	Votes	%	±%
Labour	Nkele Manaka	2,547	66.8	+0.2
Green	Rebwar Sharazur	410	10.8	+4.2
Liberal Democrats	David Hollingsworth	392	10.3	+3.0
Conservative	Taiwo Adeyemi	294	7.7	−2.8
TUSC	Richard Chaves-Sanderson	88	2.3	N/A
SDP	Paul Whetstone	59	1.5	N/A
Majority		2,137	56.1	±0.0
Turnout		3,811	22.4	−1.0
Labour hold		Swing		

=== May 2022 ===
2022
Party	Candidate	Votes	%	±%
Labour	Luke Farley	2,674	66.6	+6.2
Conservative	Brian Berry	422	10.5	−2.0
Independent	Geoff Holloran	340	8.5	−2.7
Liberal Democrats	David Hollingsworth	295	7.3	−0.4
Green	Richard Wilson	263	6.6	−0.7
Majority		2,252	56.1	+8.2
Turnout		4,015	23.4%	−5.6
Labour hold		Swing		

=== May 2021 ===
2021
Party	Candidate	Votes	%	±%
Labour	Asghar Khan*	2,984	60.4	+3.9
Conservative	Dawn Payne	619	12.5	+6.7
Independent	Geoff Holloran	554	11.2	−8.6
Liberal Democrats	David Hollingsworth	378	7.7	−3.1
Green	Karen Peters	361	7.3	+0.1
Majority		2,365	47.9	+11.2
Turnout		4,937	29.0	+6.2
Labour hold		Swing		

=== May 2019 ===
2019
Party	Candidate	Votes	%	±%
Labour	Denise Ragan*	2,052	56.5	−0.5
East Leeds Independents	Geoff Holloran	718	19.8	+5.8
Liberal Democrats	David Hollingsworth	392	10.8	−1.9
Green	John Barlow	261	7.2	−1.6
Conservative	Louisa Singh	211	5.8	−1.7
Majority		1,334	36.7	−6.3
Turnout		3,672	22.8	−2.0
Labour hold		Swing	-3.2	

=== May 2018 ===
2018
Party	Candidate	Votes	%	±%
Labour	Ron Grahame*	2,756	57.0	−0.4
Labour	Asghar Khan*	2,577		
Labour	Denise Ragan*	2,442		
East Leeds Independents	Geoff Holloran	678	14.0	N/A
Liberal Democrats	David Hollingsworth	613	12.7	+1.0
Green	Paul Marchant	428	8.8	+2.2
Conservative	Alexander Passingham	363	7.5	+2.7
Conservative	Peter Lord	327		
Conservative	Robin Rogers	294		
Majority		2,078	43.0	+4.9
Turnout		16,291	24.8	−2.5
Labour hold		Swing		
Labour hold		Swing		
Labour hold		Swing		

=== May 2016 ===
2016
Party	Candidate	Votes	%	±%
Labour	Denise Ragan	2,279	57.4	+3.6
UKIP	Geoff Holloran	766	19.3	−1.4
Liberal Democrats	David Hollingsworth	464	11.7	+2.3
Green	Penny Ellen Gilg	223	5.6	+0.5
Conservative	Peter Cavendish Lord	189	4.8	+4.3
TUSC	James Alan Ellis	47	1.2	+0.7
Majority		1,513	38.1	+5.0
Turnout		3,968	27.2	
Labour hold		Swing		

=== May 2015 ===
2015
Party	Candidate	Votes	%	±%
Labour	Asghar Khan*	4,222	53.8	+2.2
UKIP	Geoff Holloran	1,622	20.7	+20.7
Liberal Democrats	David Hollingsworth	737	9.4	−27.1
Conservative	Hayley Nancolas	715	9.1	+4.5
Green	Neil Seepujak	400	5.1	−2.2
TUSC	James Ellis	150	1.9	+1.9
Majority		2,600	33.1	+18.0
Turnout		7,846	50.9	
Labour hold		Swing	-9.3	

=== May 2014 ===
2014
Party	Candidate	Votes	%	±%
Labour	Ronald Grahame*	1,864	43.0	
UKIP	Geoff Holloran	1,150	26.6	
Liberal Democrats	David Hollingsworth	843	19.5	
Green	Pete Exley	318	7.3	
Conservative	Hayley Laura	156	3.6	
Majority		714		
Turnout		4,331	28.5	
Labour hold		Swing		

=== May 2012 ===
2012
Party	Candidate	Votes	%	±%
Labour	Maureen Ingham	2,107	52.8	+1.2
Liberal Democrats	Ralph Pryke*	1,426	35.7	−0.8
Green	Peter Exley	312	7.8	+0.5
Conservative	Michael Wheeler	149	3.7	−0.9
Majority		681	17.1	+2.0
Turnout		3,994		
Labour gain from Liberal Democrats		Swing	+1.0	

=== May 2011 ===
2011
Party	Candidate	Votes	%	±%
Labour	Asghar Khan	2,515	51.6	+7.7
Liberal Democrats	David Hollingsworth	1,779	36.5	+2.6
Green	Peter Exley	356	7.3	+4.8
Conservative	Michael Wheeler	226	4.6	−3.7
Majority		736	15.1	+5.1
Turnout		4,876	32	
Labour gain from Liberal Democrats		Swing	+2.5	

=== May 2010 ===
2010
Party	Candidate	Votes	%	±%
Labour	Ronald Grahame	3,375	43.8	+13.8
Liberal Democrats	David Hollingsworth*	2,605	33.8	−7.9
BNP	Jason Harland	888	11.5	−9.2
Conservative	Michael Wheeler	640	8.3	+2.9
Green	Peter Exley	191	2.5	+2.5
Majority		770	10.0	−1.8
Turnout		7,699	53.1	+23.7
Labour gain from Liberal Democrats		Swing	+10.8	

== See also ==
- Listed buildings in Leeds (Burmantofts and Richmond Hill Ward)
