= Beeston and Holbeck (ward) =

Electoral ward in Leeds, England

- Beeston and Holbeck highlighted within Leeds
- Population: 18,712 (2023 electorate)
- Metropolitan borough: City of Leeds
- Metropolitan county: West Yorkshire
- Region: Yorkshire and the Humber
- Country: England
- Sovereign state: United Kingdom
- UK Parliament: Leeds South
- Councillors: Shaf Ali (Labour); Matt Rogan (Green); Andrew Scopes (Labour)

Beeston and Holbeck is an electoral ward of Leeds City Council in Leeds, West Yorkshire, covering the inner city areas and urban suburbs of Beeston, Cottingley and Holbeck to the south of the city centre.

== Councillors ==
Election	Councillor	Councillor	Councillor
2004	Angela Gabriel (Lab) (Note: Gabriel had been a Beeston ward councillor since the by-election held in November 1996 to replace Jon Trickett following his election as Member of Parliament for Hemsworth.)	Adam Ogilvie (Lab) (Note: Ogilvie had served as a Beeston ward councillor since 1999.)	David Congreve (Lab) (Note: Congreve had been a Beeston ward councillor since 1990.)
2006	Angela Gabriel (Lab)	Adam Ogilvie (Lab)	David Congreve (Lab)
2007	Angela Gabriel (Lab)	Adam Ogilvie (Lab)	David Congreve (Lab)
2008	Angela Gabriel (Lab)	Adam Ogilvie (Lab)	David Congreve (Lab)
2010	Angela Gabriel (Lab)	Adam Ogilvie (Lab)	David Congreve (Lab)
2011	Angela Gabriel (Lab)	Adam Ogilvie (Lab)	David Congreve (Lab)
2012	Angela Gabriel (Lab)	Adam Ogilvie (Lab)	David Congreve (Lab)
2014	Angela Gabriel (Lab)	Adam Ogilvie (Lab)	David Congreve (Lab)
2015	Angela Gabriel (Lab)	Adam Ogilvie (Lab)	David Congreve (Lab)
2016	Angela Gabriel (Lab)	Adam Ogilvie (Lab)	David Congreve (Lab)
2018	Angela Gabriel (Lab)	Gohar Almass (Lab)	Andrew Scopes (Lab)
2019	Angela Gabriel (Lab)	Gohar Almass (Lab)	Andrew Scopes (Lab)
2021	Angela Gabriel (Lab) (Note: In December 2021, Gabriel was deselected by her local Constituency Labour Party and not allowed to stand as the Labour candidate for the next council election. Annie Maloney was chosen as the party's candidate instead and elected in May 2022.)	Gohar Almass (Lab)	Andrew Scopes (Lab)
2022	Annie Maloney (Lab)	Gohar Almass (Lab)	Andrew Scopes (Lab)
2023	Annie Maloney (Lab)	Gohar Almass (Lab)	Andrew Scopes (Lab)
2024	Annie Maloney (Lab)	Shaf Ali (Lab)	Andrew Scopes (Lab)
2026	Matt Rogan* (GPEW)	Shaf Ali* (Lab)	Andrew Scopes* (Lab)

indicates seat up for re-election. * indicates incumbent councillor.

== Elections since 2010 ==
=== May 2026 ===
2026
Party	Candidate	Votes	%	±%
Green	Matt Rogan	1,978	34.6	▲11.8
Labour	Al Garthwaite	1,725	30.2	▼22.8
Reform	Loreen Nix	1,245	21.8	New
SDP	Sasha Watson	284	5.0	▼0.2
Conservative	Alex Kettle	280	4.9	▼7.1
Liberal Democrats	Christopher Howden	159	2.8	▼1.9
Monster Raving Loony	Nick The Duck Guy	43	0.8	New
Majority		253	4.4	▼25.8
Turnout		5,731	31.2	▲5.3
Rejected ballots		17	0.3	
Registered electors		18,361		
Green gain from Labour		Swing	▲17.3	

=== May 2024 ===
2024
Party	Candidate	Votes	%	±%
Labour	Shaf Ali	2,533	53.0	−9.9
Green	Matt Rogan	1,092	22.8	+6.1
Conservative	Bradley Chandler	572	12.0	+0.7
SDP	Sasha Watson	247	5.2	+2.5
Liberal Democrats	George Sykes	226	4.7	−0.6
TUSC	Louie Fulton	113	2.4	+1.3
Majority		1,441	30.2	−16.0
Turnout		4,783	25.9	+4.5
Labour hold		Swing	-8.0	

=== May 2023 ===
2023
Party	Candidate	Votes	%	±%
Labour	Andrew Scopes*	2,494	62.9	+15.7
Green	Mariana Polucciu	662	16.7	−5.5
Conservative	Muhammad Azeem	450	11.3	−5.6
Liberal Democrats	Peter Andrews	209	5.3	+1.2
SDP	Nigel Perry	107	2.7	−3.0
TUSC	Katherine Gwyther	44	1.1	N/A
Majority		1,832	46.2	+21.1
Turnout		3,996	21.4	−2.6
Labour hold		Swing		

=== May 2022 ===
2022
Party	Candidate	Votes	%	±%
Labour	Annie Maloney	2,070	47.2	−5.6
Green	Mariana Polucciu	971	22.2	+8.0
Conservative	Natalia Armitage	740	16.9	−2.0
SDP	Nigel Perry	250	5.7	N/A
Liberal Democrats	Peter Andrews	179	4.1	+1.9
NIP	Emily Reaney	147	3.4	N/A
Majority		1,099	25.1	−8.8
Turnout		4,382	24.0	−5.4
Labour hold		Swing		

=== May 2021 ===
2021
Party	Candidate	Votes	%	±%
Labour	Gohar Almass*	2,777	52.8	+5.3
Conservative	Andrew Martin	996	18.9	+11.3
Green	Becky Kellett	748	14.2	+7.1
Save Our Beeston and Holbeck Independents	Francesca Robinson	468	8.8	−16.4
Liberal Democrats	Robert Jaques	117	2.2	−2.2
Freedom Alliance. No Lockdowns. No Curfews.	Bill Palfreman	82	1.6	N/A
TUSC	Jay Slayton-Joslin	34	0.1	N/A
Majority		1,781	33.9	+11.6
Turnout		5,260	29.4	+4.2
Labour hold		Swing		

=== May 2019 ===
2019
Party	Candidate	Votes	%	±%
Labour	Andrew Scopes*	2,033	47.5	−5.8
Save Our Beeston and Holbeck Independents	Laura Walton	1,079	25.2	−1.1
UKIP	Bill Palfreman	349	8.2	+8.2
Conservative	Robert Winfield	326	7.6	−2.6
Green	Alaric Hall	302	7.1	+0.1
Liberal Democrats	Jarrod Gaines	187	4.4	+0.4
Majority		954	22.3	−4.7
Turnout		4,293	25.2	−3.6
Labour hold		Swing	-2.4	

=== May 2018 ===
2018
Party	Candidate	Votes	%	±%
Labour	Angela Gabriel*	2,593	53.3	−8.1
Labour	Gohar Almass	2,471		
Labour	Andrew Scopes	2,257		
Save Our Beeston and Holbeck Independents	Bill Birch	1,281	26.3	N/A
Save Our Beeston and Holbeck Independents	Laura Walton	1,269		
Save Our Beeston and Holbeck Independents	Sean Sturman	1,250		
Conservative	Robert Winfield	495	10.2	−0.1
Conservative	Lyn Buckley	464		
Conservative	Ian Robertson	395		
Green	Owen Brear	343	7.0	+1.4
Liberal Democrats	Jarrod Gaines	197	4.0	+2.0
Liberal Democrats	Robert Durdin	159		
Majority		1,312	27.0	−13.3
Turnout		16,927	28.8	+0.5
Labour hold		Swing		
Labour hold		Swing		
Labour hold		Swing		

=== May 2016 ===
2016
Party	Candidate	Votes	%	±%
Labour	Angela Gabriel*	2,547	61.4	+8.3
UKIP	Luke Barry Senior	833	20.1	−2.9
Conservative	Robert Winfield	429	10.3	−3.9
Green	Adam David John Dent	232	5.6	−0.3
Liberal Democrats	Kathryn Elizabeth Gagen	84	2.0	−0.4
TUSC	Kevin Michael Pattison	26	0.6	−0.9
Majority		1,714	+40.3	+10.2
Turnout		4,151	28.3	
Labour hold		Swing		

=== May 2015 ===
2015
Party	Candidate	Votes	%	±%
Labour	Adam Ogilvie*	4,335	53.1	−8.2
UKIP	Tony Roberts	1,876	23.0	+13.9
Conservative	Robert Winfield	1,158	14.2	−3.6
Green	Emma Jaynes	480	5.9	−0.7
Liberal Democrats	Kathryn Gagen	200	2.4	−2.8
TUSC	Amy Cousens	119	1.5	+1.5
Majority		2,459	30.1	−13.4
Turnout		8,168	53.7	
Labour hold		Swing	-11.1	

=== May 2014 ===
2014
Party	Candidate	Votes	%	±%
Labour	David Congreve*	2,063	48.4	
UKIP	Tony Roberts	1,288	30.2	
Conservative	Robert Winfield	499	11.7	
Green	David Smith	284	6.7	
Liberal Democrats	Victoria Bishop-Rowe	130	3.0	
Majority		775		
Turnout		4,264	28.72	
Labour hold		Swing		

=== May 2012 ===
2012
Party	Candidate	Votes	%	±%
Labour	Angela Gabriel*	2,389	62.1	+0.8
Conservative	Robert Winfield	443	11.5	−6.3
UKIP	Wilfred Woodhouse	349	9.1	+0.0
English Democrat	Ian Gibson	298	7.7	+7.7
Green	David Smith	256	6.7	+0.1
Liberal Democrats	Rory Laing	113	2.9	−2.3
Majority		1,946	50.6	+7.1
Turnout		3,848		
Labour hold		Swing	+3.5	

=== May 2011 ===
2011
Party	Candidate	Votes	%	±%
Labour	Adam Ogilvie*	2,880	61.3	+13.9
Conservative	Robert Winfield	838	17.8	−1.8
UKIP	Wilfred Woodhouse	425	9.1	+4.8
Green	David Smith	308	6.6	+4.2
Liberal Democrats	Paul Swain	245	5.2	−10.2
Majority		2,042	43.5	+15.8
Turnout		4,696	31	
Labour hold		Swing	+7.8	

=== May 2010 ===
2010
Party	Candidate	Votes	%	±%
Labour	David Congreve*	3,934	47.4	+5.7
Conservative	Robert Winfield	1,632	19.7	−3.0
Liberal Democrats	Alex Tyson	1,283	15.5	+5.0
BNP	Dean Taylor	902	10.9	−4.2
UKIP	Wilfred Woodhouse	355	4.3	−0.4
Green	Colin Johnston	192	2.3	−3.1
Majority		2,302	27.7	+8.7
Turnout		8,298	57.0	+28.5
Labour hold		Swing	+4.3	

== See also ==
- Listed buildings in Leeds (Beeston and Holbeck Ward)
