= Temple Newsam (ward) =

Electoral ward in Leeds, England

- Temple Newsam highlighted within Leeds
- Population: 16,730 (2023 electorate)
- Metropolitan borough: City of Leeds
- Metropolitan county: West Yorkshire
- Region: Yorkshire and the Humber
- Country: England
- Sovereign state: United Kingdom
- UK Parliament: Leeds East Leeds South
- Councillors: Richard Barker (Reform UK); Helen Hayden (Labour); Kieran White (Reform UK)

Temple Newsam is an electoral ward of Leeds City Council in east Leeds, West Yorkshire, covering the outer city suburbs of Colton, Halton, Halton Moor and Whitkirk. Austhorpe is also shared with Cross Gates and Whinmoor ward, whilst the current civil parish boundaries of Austhorpe see its eastern half lie in the western tip of Garforth and Swillington ward.

The ward population at the 2011 Census was 21,543 and ward itself is named after the Temple Newsam estate.

== Boundaries ==
The Temple Newsam ward includes the civil parish of Austhorpe (west half).

== Councillors since 1973 ==
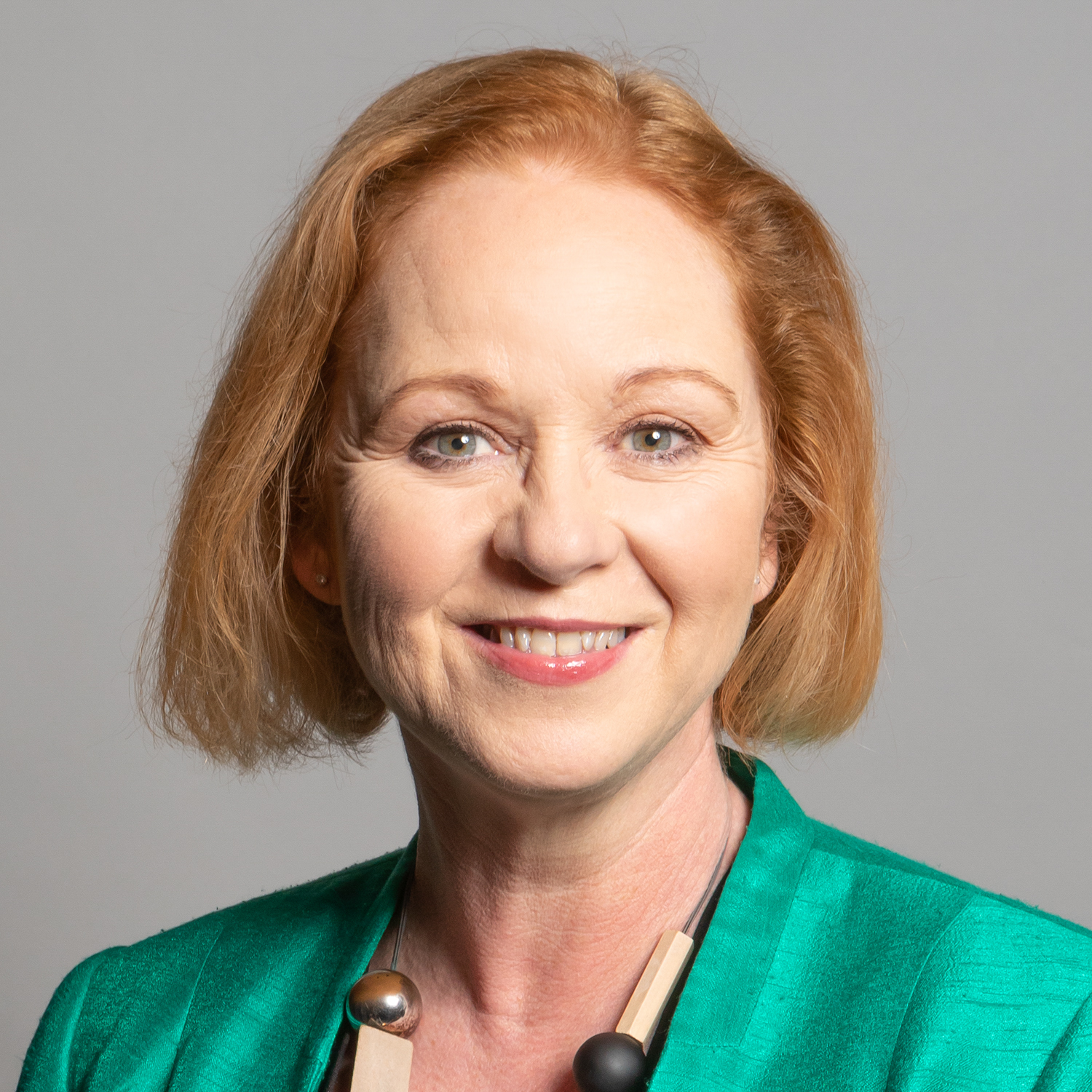
Judith Cummins represented Temple Newsam ward (2012-2016). Member of Parliament for Bradford South since 2015.

Election	Councillor	Councillor	Councillor
Halton (1951 to 2004)
1973	Martin Dodgson (Con) (Note: Dodgson had served as a Halton councillor since 1968.)	Bill Hyde (Con) (Note: Hyde had served as a Halton councillor since 1973.)	Doreen Wood (Con) (Note: Wood had represented Osmondthorpe ward between 1968 and 1973.)
1975	Martin Dodgson (Con)	Bill Hyde (Con)	Doreen Wood (Con)
1976	Martin Dodgson (Con)	Bill Hyde (Con)	Doreen Wood (Con)
1978	Martin Dodgson (Con)	Bill Hyde (Con)	Doreen Wood (Con)
1979	Martin Dodgson (Con)	Bill Hyde (Con)	Doreen Wood (Con)
1980	Martin Dodgson (Con)	Bill Hyde (Con)	Doreen Wood (Con)
1982	Martin Dodgson (Con)	Bill Hyde (Con)	Doreen Wood (Con)
1983	Martin Dodgson (Con)	Bill Hyde (Con)	Doreen Wood (Con)
1984	Martin Dodgson (Con)	Bill Hyde (Con)	Doreen Wood (Con)
1986	David Schofield (Con) (Note: Schofield previously represented Garforth and Swillington ward between 1982 and 1986.)	Bill Hyde (Con)	Doreen Wood (Con)
1987	David Schofield (Con)	Bill Hyde (Con)	Doreen Wood (Con)
1988	Donald Townsley (Con)	Bill Hyde (Con)	Doreen Wood (Con)
1990	Donald Townsley (Con)	Bill Hyde (Con)	John Sully (Lab) (Note: Sully represented Burley ward between 1971 and 1973.)
1991	Donald Townsley (Con)	Bill Hyde (Con)	John Sully (Lab)
1992	David Schofield (Con)	Bill Hyde (Con)	John Sully (Lab) (Note: Sully stood unsuccessfully for North ward in 1994. He was later elected to represent the ward between 1995 and 1999.)
1994	David Schofield (Con)	Bill Hyde (Con)	Lee Benson (Lab)
1995	David Schofield (Con)	Doris McGee (Lab)	Lee Benson (Lab)
1996	Randolph Haggerty (Lab)	Doris McGee (Lab)	Lee Benson (Lab)
1998	Randolph Haggerty (Lab)	Doris McGee (Lab)	Lee Benson (Lab)
1999	Randolph Haggerty (Lab)	Doris McGee (Lab)	Lee Benson (Lab)
2000	Bill Hyde (Con)	Doris McGee (Lab)	Lee Benson (Lab)
2002	Bill Hyde (Con)	Doris McGee (Lab)	Lee Benson (Lab)
2003	Bill Hyde (Con)	Doris McGee (Lab)	Lee Benson (Lab)
Temple Newsam (2004 to present)
2004	Bill Hyde (Con)	David Schofield (Con)	Michael Lyons OBE (Lab) (Note: Lyons, previously a councillor for Richmond Hill ward from 1980, was awarded an OBE in the 2003 Birthday Honours.)
2006	Bill Hyde (Con)	David Schofield (Con)	Michael Lyons OBE (Lab)
2007	Bill Hyde (Con)	Jacqueline Langdale (Lab)	Michael Lyons OBE (Lab)
2008	Bill Hyde (Con)	Jacqueline Langdale (Lab) (Note: Langdale resigned from the council for personal reasons in February 2009, triggering an April 2009 by-election. It was subsequently won by the Conservatives. In October 2008, the Daily Express had reported Langdale had been involved in an extramarital affair with the 2008 Labour candidate for Temple Newsam, Jeff Coupar. Coupar was also married to Middleton Park and later Temple Newsam ward councillor, Debra Coupar.)	Michael Lyons OBE (Lab)
2009 by-election	Bill Hyde (Con)	David Schofield (Con)	Michael Lyons OBE (Lab)
2010	Bill Hyde (Con)	David Schofield (Con)	Michael Lyons OBE (Lab)
2011	Bill Hyde (Con)	Katherine Mitchell (Lab)	Michael Lyons OBE (Lab)
2012	Judith Cummins (Lab) (Note: Cummins was previously a Bradford City Councillor for Royds ward from 2004 to 2007.)	Katherine Mitchell (Lab)	Michael Lyons OBE (Lab)
2014	Judith Cummins (Lab)	Katherine Mitchell (Lab)	Michael Lyons OBE (Lab)
2015	Judith Cummins (Lab) (Note: Cummins was elected as Member of Parliament for Bradford South on the same day as the 2015 council election. She stood down from the council at the 2016 council election.)	Helen Hayden (Lab)	Michael Lyons OBE (Lab)
2016	Debra Coupar (Lab) (Note: Cross Gates and Whinmoor ward councillor Coupar replaced Judith Cummins. She had previously represented Morley South ward from 2003 to 2004, Middleton Park ward between 2006 and 2010 and Cross Gates and Whinmoor since 2013.)	Helen Hayden (Lab)	Michael Lyons OBE (Lab)
2018	Debra Coupar (Lab)	Helen Hayden (Lab)	Michael Lyons OBE (Lab)
2019	Debra Coupar (Lab)	Helen Hayden (Lab)	Nicole Sharpe (Lab)
2021	Debra Coupar (Lab)	Helen Hayden (Lab)	Nicole Sharpe (Lab)
2022	Debra Coupar (Lab)	Helen Hayden (Lab)	Nicole Sharpe (Lab)
2023	Debra Coupar (Lab)	Helen Hayden (Lab)	Nicole Sharpe (Lab)
2024	Debra Coupar (Lab)	Helen Hayden (Lab)	Nicole Sharpe (Lab) (Note: Subsequently changed name to Nicole Lloyd.)
2026	Richard Barker* (RUK)	Helen Hayden* (Lab)	Kieran White* (RUK)

indicates seat up for re-election. indicates seat up for election following resignation or death of sitting councillor. * indicates incumbent councillor.

== Elections since 2010 ==
=== May 2026 ===
2026
Party	Candidate	Votes	%	±%
Reform	Richard Barker	2,456		
Reform	Kieran Richard Thomas White	2,253		
Labour Co-op	Julia Almond	1,990		
Labour Co-op	Tim Dowd	1,809		
Conservative	Maggie Taylor	1,172		
Conservative	Max Holley	992		
Green	Joshua Benjamin Alston	813		
Green	Keely Bannister	768		
Liberal Democrats	Keith Cecil Norman	355		
Liberal Democrats	Noah Allerton	317		
SDP	Kimberley Ruth Reid	60		
SDP	Rajiv Kumar Thukral	49		
Turnout			41.8	
Rejected ballots		10		
Registered electors		16,650		
Reform gain from Labour		Swing		
Reform gain from Labour		Swing		

=== May 2024 ===
2024
Party	Candidate	Votes	%	±%
Labour Co-op	Helen Hayden*	2,760	52.4	+0.6
Conservative	Cormac Trigg	1,237	23.5	−8.9
Reform	David Dresser	543	10.3	New
Green	Nicola Dos Santos	379	7.2	+0.7
Liberal Democrats	Keith Norman	319	6.1	−1.3
SDP	Wendy Whetstone	33	0.6	−0.6
Majority		1,523	28.9	+9.5
Turnout		5,317	31.8	+1.5
Labour hold		Swing	+4.8	

=== May 2023 ===
2023
Party	Candidate	Votes	%	±%
Labour	Nicole Sharpe*	2,632	51.8	+2.2
Conservative	Cormac Trigg	1,647	32.4	−7.5
Liberal Democrats	Keith Norman	376	7.4	+2.2
Green	Geraldine Turver	331	6.5	+1.7
SDP	Wendy Whetstone	61	1.2	N/A
Majority		985	19.4	+9.7
Turnout		5,077	30.3	−5.0
Labour hold		Swing		

=== May 2022 ===
2022
Party	Candidate	Votes	%	±%
Labour	Debra Coupar*	2,920	49.6	+5.1
Conservative	Jonathan Firth	2,350	39.9	−4.4
Liberal Democrats	Keith Norman	305	5.2	−0.2
Green	Shahab Adris	281	4.8	−0.3
Majority		570	9.7	+9.7
Turnout		5,885	35.3	−2.1
Labour hold		Swing		

=== May 2021 ===
2021
Party	Candidate	Votes	%	±%
Labour	Helen Hayden*	2,785	44.5	+5.8
Conservative	Jonathan Firth	2,773	44.3	+13.5
Liberal Democrats	Keith Norman	338	5.4	−1.2
Green	Shahab Saqib Adris	320	5.1	−2.3
Majority		12	0.0	−7.9
Turnout		6,256	37.4	+6.7
Labour hold		Swing		

=== May 2019 ===
2019
Party	Candidate	Votes	%	±%
Labour	Nicole Sharpe	1,947	38.7	−5.3
Conservative	Liz Hayes	1,549	30.8	−4.4
UKIP	Ian Greenberg	702	14.0	+14.0
Green	Shahab Saqib Adris	373	7.4	−2.8
Liberal Democrats	Keith Norman	330	6.6	−1.4
For Britain	Billy Baldwin	126	2.5	+2.5
Majority		398	7.9	0.9
Turnout		5,068	30.7	−4.5
Labour hold		Swing	-1.0	

=== May 2018 ===
2018
Party	Candidate	Votes	%	±%
Labour	Debra Coupar*	2,641	44.0	−2.6
Labour	Helen Hayden*	2,603		
Labour	Mick Lyons*	2,482		
Conservative	Elizabeth Hayes	2,113	35.2	+10.4
Conservative	Neale Deacon	2,062		
Conservative	Robert Hayes	1,739		
Green	Fiona Love	610	10.2	+7.1
Liberal Democrats	Keith Norman	478	8.0	+4.3
Majority		528	8.8	−13.0
Turnout		6,002	36.2	+0.2
Labour hold		Swing		
Labour hold		Swing		
Labour hold		Swing		

=== May 2016 ===
2016
Party	Candidate	Votes	%	±%
Labour	Debra Coupar	2,690	46.6	+3.7
Conservative	David Schofield	1,430	24.8	−4.4
UKIP	Phil Moore	1,259	21.8	+1.8
Liberal Democrats	Keith Cecil Norman	216	3.7	−0.3
Green	Sarah Ann Crossland	179	3.1	−0.7
Majority		1,260	21.8	+8.1
Turnout		5,774	36.0	
Labour hold		Swing		

=== May 2015 ===
2015
Party	Candidate	Votes	%	±%
Labour	Helen Hayden	4,493	42.9	−11.5
Conservative	Elizabeth Hayes	3,059	29.2	−9.6
UKIP	Bruce Naylor	2,097	20.0	+20.0
Liberal Democrats	Keith Norman	420	4.0	−2.8
Green	Nathan Allen	401	3.8	+3.8
Majority		1,434	13.7	−1.8
Turnout		10,470	63.6	
Labour hold		Swing	-1.0	

=== May 2014 ===
2014
Party	Candidate	Votes	%	±%
Labour	Mick Lyons*	2,294		
UKIP	Bruce Naylor	1,599		
Conservative	David Schofield	1,377		
Green	Nathan Allen	335		
Liberal Democrats	Keith Norman	148		
Majority		695		
Turnout			35.38	
Labour hold		Swing		

=== May 2012 ===
2012
Party	Candidate	Votes	%	±%
Labour	Judith Cummins	3,137	53.6	−0.8
Conservative	Bill Hyde*	1,505	25.7	−13.1
Independent	David Rudge	654	11.2	+11.2
English Democrat	Jordan Fawcett	370	6.3	+6.3
Liberal Democrats	Ian Dowling	192	3.3	−3.5
Majority		1,632	27.9	+12.4
Turnout		5,858		
Labour gain from Conservative		Swing	+6.1	

=== May 2011 ===
2011
Party	Candidate	Votes	%	±%
Labour	Katherine Mitchell	3,707	54.4	+16.8
Conservative	David Schofield*	2,648	38.8	+11.0
Liberal Democrats	Ian Dowling	464	6.8	−7.3
Majority		1,059	15.5	+5.7
Turnout		6,819	42	
Labour gain from Conservative		Swing	+2.9	

=== May 2010 ===
2010
Party	Candidate	Votes	%	±%
Labour	Mick Lyons*	4,098	37.6	+8.0
Conservative	Elizabeth Hayes	3,032	27.8	−6.1
Liberal Democrats	Ian Dowling	1,538	14.1	+6.7
Independent	David Gale	1,072	9.8	+2.9
BNP	Ian Gibson	1,041	9.5	−12.6
Alliance for Green Socialism	Gareth Christie	126	1.2	+1.2
Majority		1,066	9.8	+5.5
Turnout		10,907	67.9	+23.9
Labour hold		Swing	+7.0	

== See also ==
- Listed buildings in Leeds (Temple Newsam Ward)
