= 2012 Leeds City Council election =

- 3 May 2012

33 of the 99 seats on Leeds City Council 50 seats needed for a majority
	First party	Second party	Third party
Leader	Keith Wakefield	Andrew Carter	Stewart Golton
Party	Labour	Conservative	Liberal Democrats
Last election	22 seats, 46.8%	7 seats, 27.1%	2 seats, 13.6%
Seats won	21	6	3
Seats after	63	19	10
Seat change	▲8	▼2	▼6
Popular vote	80,312	38,376	22,619
Percentage	46.0%	22.0%	13.0%
	Fourth party	Fifth party	Sixth party
Party	Morley Borough Independents	Green	UKIP
Last election	1 seats, 2.7%	1 seats, 4.8%	0 seats, 2.0%
Seats won	2	1	0
Seats after	5	2	0
Seat change	Steady	Steady	Steady
Popular vote	6,833	9,390	8,064
Percentage	3.9%	5.4%	4.6%
- Labour in red (21), Conservatives in blue (6), Liberal Democrats in yellow (3), Morley Borough Independents in dark green (2) and Greens in light green (1).
Council control before election
Majority administration
Labour
Council control after election
Majority administration
Labour

The 2012 Leeds City Council election took place on Thursday 3 May 2012 to elect members to Leeds City Council in England. It was held on the same day as other local elections across the UK.

As per the election cycle, one third of the council's seats were up for election. The councillors subsequently elected replaced those elected when their individual seats were previously contested in 2008.

Since taking majority control of the council in 2011, the Labour council administration increased their total number of councillors from 55 to 63. They won eight more seats at the election, including six from the Liberal Democrats.

== Election result ==
Leeds City Council Election Result 2012
Party	Seats	Gains	Losses	Net gain/loss	Seats %	Votes %	Votes	+/−
Labour	21	8	0	▲8	63.6	46.0	80,312	-0.8
Conservative	6	0	2	▼2	18.2	22.0	38,376	-5.1
Liberal Democrats	3	0	6	▼6	9.1	13.0	22,619	-0.6
Green	1	0	0	Steady	3.0	5.4	9,390	+0.6
UKIP	0	0	0	Steady	0.0	4.6	8,064	+2.6
Morley Borough Independent	2	0	0	Steady	6.1	3.9	6,833	+1.2
English Democrat	0	0	0	Steady	0.0	2.6	4,594	+1.3
Alliance for Green Socialism	0	0	0	Steady	0.0	1.1	1,865	+0.3
Independent	0	0	0	Steady	0.0	0.6	1,028	+0.3
BNP	0	0	0	Steady	0.0	0.5	893	+0.0
TUSC	0	0	0	Steady	0.0	0.3	564	+0.2

This result had the following consequences for the total number of seats on the council after the elections:

Party	2011 election	New council
Labour	55	63
Conservative	21	19
Liberal Democrat	16	10
Morley Borough Independent	5	5
Green	2	2
Total	99	99
Working majority	11	27

== Councillors who did not stand for re-election ==
Councillor/s who did not stand for re-election (9)
Councillor	Ward	First elected	Party	Reason	Successor
Denise Atkinson MBE	Bramley & Stanningley	1980	Labour	stood down	Caroline Gruen (Labour)
Ben Chastney	Weetwood	2008	Liberal Democrats	stood down	Jonathan Bentley (Liberal Democrats)
Geoff Driver	Middleton Park	1978	Labour	stood down	Paul Truswell (Labour)
Penny Ewens	Hyde Park & Woodhouse	2008	Liberal Democrats	stood down	Christine Towler (Labour)
Ronald Feldman	Alwoodley	1971	Conservative	stood down	Neil Buckley (Conservative)
Graham Kirkland	Otley & Yeadon	1973, 1980, 2004	Liberal Democrats	stood down	Sandy Lay (Liberal Democrats)
Matthew Lobley	Roundhay	2003	Conservative	stood down	Bill Urry (Labour)
Keith Parker	Kippax & Methley	1986	Labour	stood down	Mary Harland (Labour)
Alan Taylor	Gipton & Harehills	1999	Liberal Democrats	stood down	Roger Harington (Labour)

== Ward results ==
Adel & Wharfedale
Party	Candidate	Votes	%	±%
Conservative	Barry Anderson*	3,674	52.9	+2.7
Labour	Nigel Gill	1,301	18.7	−1.9
Liberal Democrats	Christina Shaw	1,202	17.3	−4.0
UKIP	Claire Wilson-Sharp	486	7.0	+3.2
Green	Paul Marchant	217	3.1	−1.0
Alliance for Green Socialism	Gareth Christie	71	1.0	+1.0
Majority		2,373	34.1	+5.2
Turnout		6,951		
Conservative hold		Swing	+2.3	

Alwoodley
Party	Candidate	Votes	%	±%
Conservative	Neil Buckley	3,079	48.3	−5.0
Labour	Alison Garthwaite	2,121	33.3	−2.2
UKIP	Warren Hendon	558	8.8	+1.9
Liberal Democrats	Richard Whelan	401	6.3	+6.3
Alliance for Green Socialism	Brian Jackson	217	3.4	−1.0
Majority		958	15.0	−2.9
Turnout		6,376		
Conservative hold		Swing	-1.4	

Ardsley & Robin Hood
Party	Candidate	Votes	%	±%
Labour	Karen Renshaw*	2,318	50.2	+1.5
Conservative	Sophie Tempest	884	19.2	−4.4
English Democrat	Joanna Beverley	787	17.1	+2.0
Morley Borough Independent	Wyn Kidger	626	13.6	+13.6
Majority		1,434	31.1	+6.0
Turnout		4,615		
Labour hold		Swing	+2.9	

Armley
Party	Candidate	Votes	%	±%
Labour	Alison Lowe*	2,686	61.2	−1.6
Green	Jane Morrison	596	13.6	−0.1
Conservative	Ross Burgham	554	12.6	−3.9
Liberal Democrats	Elizabeth Arnott	326	7.4	+0.4
TUSC	Stephen Hobson	229	5.2	+5.2
Majority		2,090	47.6	+1.3
Turnout		4,391		
Labour hold		Swing	-0.7	

Beeston and Holbeck
Party	Candidate	Votes	%	±%
Labour	Angela Gabriel*	2,389	62.1	+0.8
Conservative	Robert Winfield	443	11.5	−6.3
UKIP	Wilfred Woodhouse	349	9.1	+0.0
English Democrat	Ian Gibson	298	7.7	+7.7
Green	David Smith	256	6.7	+0.1
Liberal Democrats	Rory Laing	113	2.9	−2.3
Majority		1,946	50.6	+7.1
Turnout		3,848		
Labour hold		Swing	+3.5	

Bramley & Stanningley
Party	Candidate	Votes	%	±%
Labour	Caroline Gruen	2,343	55.1	−5.7
UKIP	Anne Murgatroyd	655	15.4	+15.4
Conservative	Mohammed Rahman	323	7.6	−12.7
Liberal Democrats	Nathan Fossey	323	7.6	−1.4
English Democrat	Dean Loke	307	7.2	+7.2
Green	Kate Bisson	304	7.1	−2.9
Majority		1,688	39.7	−0.8
Turnout		4,255		
Labour hold		Swing	-10.5	

Burmantofts & Richmond Hill
Party	Candidate	Votes	%	±%
Labour	Maureen Ingham	2,107	52.8	+1.2
Liberal Democrats	Ralph Pryke*	1,426	35.7	−0.8
Green	Peter Exley	312	7.8	+0.5
Conservative	Michael Wheeler	149	3.7	−0.9
Majority		681	17.1	+2.0
Turnout		3,994		
Labour gain from Liberal Democrats		Swing	+1.0	

Calverley & Farsley
Party	Candidate	Votes	%	±%
Conservative	Andrew Carter*	3,436	52.7	+4.5
Labour	Rachel Seabright	2,142	32.8	−9.8
UKIP	Alistair McDowall	433	6.6	+6.6
Green	Clive Lord	297	4.6	+4.6
Liberal Democrats	Kate Arbuckle	218	3.3	−5.9
Majority		1,294	19.8	+14.3
Turnout		6,526		
Conservative hold		Swing	+7.1	

Chapel Allerton
Party	Candidate	Votes	%	±%
Labour	Eileen Taylor*	3,588	67.4	+3.7
Conservative	David Myers	550	10.3	−3.1
Alliance for Green Socialism	Mike Davies	483	9.1	+1.3
Green	Colin Noble	409	7.7	+0.2
Liberal Democrats	Adam Slack	297	5.6	−2.2
Majority		3,038	57.0	+6.8
Turnout		5,327		
Labour hold		Swing	+3.4	

City & Hunslet
Party	Candidate	Votes	%	±%
Labour	Elizabeth Nash*	2,402	67.4	+4.7
Conservative	Matthew Wharton	473	13.3	−3.7
Liberal Democrats	Jahangir Aziz	357	10.0	−10.3
Green	Neil Seepujak	331	9.3	+9.3
Majority		1,929	54.1	+11.7
Turnout		3,563		
Labour hold		Swing	+4.2	

Cross Gates & Whinmoor
Party	Candidate	Votes	%	±%
Labour	Suzi Armitage*	3,597	69.8	+12.9
UKIP	Darren Oddy	619	12.0	+4.1
Conservative	Dorothy Flynn	323	6.3	−16.7
Green	Ben Goldthorp	243	4.7	+0.8
Liberal Democrats	Keith Norman	195	3.8	−0.4
English Democrat	John Ashton	176	3.4	+3.4
Majority		2,978	57.8	+23.8
Turnout		5,153		
Labour hold		Swing	+4.4	

Farnley & Wortley
Party	Candidate	Votes	%	±%
Green	David Blackburn*	2,516	48.9	+1.5
Labour	David Dresser	1,608	31.2	−6.0
UKIP	Mark Thackray	541	10.5	+10.5
Conservative	Ryan Stephenson	295	5.7	−6.4
Liberal Democrats	Elizabeth Bee	118	2.3	−0.9
Independent	William Croke	69	1.3	+1.3
Majority		908	17.6	+7.4
Turnout		5,147		
Green hold		Swing	+3.7	

Garforth & Swillington
Party	Candidate	Votes	%	±%
Labour	Andrea McKenna*	3,499	58.0	−6.2
Conservative	Louise Turner	1,785	29.6	−2.8
English Democrat	Stephen Elliot	544	9.0	+9.0
Liberal Democrats	Christine Golton	208	3.4	+0.0
Majority		1,714	28.4	−3.3
Turnout		6,036		
Labour hold		Swing	-1.7	

Gipton & Harehills
Party	Candidate	Votes	%	±%
Labour	Roger Harington	3,900	71.7	−8.5
Liberal Democrats	Abdul Abedin	997	18.3	+9.9
Conservative	Beatrice Greenwood	325	6.0	−1.7
Alliance for Green Socialism	Azar Iqbal	217	4.0	+0.3
Majority		2,903	53.4	−18.3
Turnout		5,439		
Labour gain from Liberal Democrats		Swing	-9.2	

Guiseley & Rawdon
Party	Candidate	Votes	%	±%
Conservative	Graham Latty*	2,750	43.7	+0.9
Labour	Mike King	2,526	40.1	+2.8
Green	Colin Avison	621	9.9	+3.0
Liberal Democrats	Robert Jacques	397	6.3	−3.9
Majority		224	3.6	−1.9
Turnout		6,294		
Conservative hold		Swing	-0.9	

Harewood
Party	Candidate	Votes	%	±%
Conservative	Ann Castle*	3,555	60.0	−7.1
Labour	Richard Beacham	1,156	19.5	−1.7
UKIP	Peter Morgan	636	10.7	+10.7
Liberal Democrats	Sara Howell	312	5.3	−1.1
Green	Patricia Capstick	262	4.4	−0.9
Majority		2,399	40.5	−5.4
Turnout		5,921		
Conservative hold		Swing	-2.7	

Headingley
Party	Candidate	Votes	%	±%
Labour	Janette Walker	1,053	38.2	−1.4
Liberal Democrats	Jamie Matthews*	1,021	37.0	+8.7
Green	Christopher Foren	457	16.6	−1.0
Conservative	Diane Fox	147	5.3	−4.2
TUSC	Iain Dalton	82	3.0	+0.7
Majority		32	1.2	−10.1
Turnout		2,760		
Labour gain from Liberal Democrats		Swing	-5.0	

Horsforth
Party	Candidate	Votes	%	±%
Liberal Democrats	Chris Townsley*	2,636	40.0	+9.0
Conservative	Richard Hardcastle	1,725	26.2	−7.6
Labour	Gary Kaye	1,381	21.0	−6.9
UKIP	Paul Hellyer	453	6.9	+1.6
Green	Andrea Binns	317	4.8	+4.8
TUSC	Andrew Smith	77	1.2	−0.9
Majority		911	13.8	+11.1
Turnout		6,589		
Liberal Democrats hold		Swing	+8.3	

Hyde Park & Woodhouse
Party	Candidate	Votes	%	±%
Labour	Christine Towler	1,686	63.0	+5.7
Green	David Webb	387	14.5	−2.5
Liberal Democrats	Lance Ibiador-Moses	212	7.9	−9.0
Conservative	Thomas Martin	183	6.8	−1.9
Independent	Ghaffar Karim	132	4.9	+4.9
Alliance for Green Socialism	Dil Nawaz	75	2.8	+2.8
Majority		1,299	48.6	+8.2
Turnout		2,675		
Labour gain from Liberal Democrats		Swing	+4.1	

Killingbeck & Seacroft
Party	Candidate	Votes	%	±%
Labour	Graham Hyde*	3,240	73.8	+0.3
English Democrat	Sam Kelly	487	11.1	+11.1
Conservative	Elizabeth Hayes	439	10.0	−6.6
Liberal Democrats	Harriet Chapman	223	5.1	−4.8
Majority		2,753	62.7	+5.7
Turnout		4,389		
Labour hold		Swing	+3.4	

Kippax & Methley
Party	Candidate	Votes	%	±%
Labour	Mary Harland	3,543	63.8	+0.6
UKIP	Paul Spivey	889	16.0	+6.7
Conservative	James Langley	871	15.7	−6.1
Liberal Democrats	Audrey Brown	247	4.5	−1.2
Majority		2,654	47.8	+6.3
Turnout		5,550		
Labour hold		Swing	-3.0	

Kirkstall
Party	Candidate	Votes	%	±%
Labour	Lucinda Yeadon*	3,006	67.7	+3.2
Green	Morgan Tatchell-Evans	437	9.8	+0.5
Conservative	Annabel Gooch	398	9.0	−3.1
Liberal Democrats	Tom Mead	293	6.6	−4.7
Independent	Stuart Long	173	3.9	+1.1
Alliance for Green Socialism	Simon Fearn	136	3.1	+3.1
Majority		2,569	57.8	+5.4
Turnout		4,443		
Labour hold		Swing	+1.3	

Middleton Park
Party	Candidate	Votes	%	±%
Labour	Paul Truswell	2,696	64.3	−0.2
BNP	Kevin Meeson	893	21.3	+3.9
Conservative	James McFarland	412	9.8	−3.4
Liberal Democrats	Sadie Fisher	191	4.6	−0.4
Majority		1,803	43.0	−4.1
Turnout		4,192		
Labour hold		Swing	-2.0	

Moortown
Party	Candidate	Votes	%	±%
Labour Co-op	Alex Sobel	3,045	44.6	+0.0
Liberal Democrats	Mark Harris*	2,265	33.1	−1.1
Conservative	Mark Rowlinson	804	11.8	−4.9
UKIP	Jeff Miles	430	6.3	+6.3
Alliance for Green Socialism	Allan House	290	4.2	−0.4
Majority		780	11.4	+1.1
Turnout		6,834		
Labour gain from Liberal Democrats		Swing	+0.5	

Morley North
Party	Candidate	Votes	%	±%
Morley Borough Independent	Robert Finnigan*	3,517	61.3	+8.5
Labour	Margaret Foster	1,240	21.6	−1.6
Conservative	David Schofield	519	9.1	−3.6
English Democrat	Tom Redmond	458	8.0	−0.3
Majority		2,277	39.7	+10.0
Turnout		5,734		
Morley Borough Independent hold		Swing	+5.0	

Morley South
Party	Candidate	Votes	%	±%
Morley Borough Independent	Judith Elliott*	2,690	50.0	+17.4
Labour	Kathryn Rose	1,507	28.0	−5.5
English Democrat	Chris Beverley	811	15.1	−4.5
Conservative	John McKee	376	7.0	−4.6
Majority		1,183	22.0	+21.2
Turnout		5,384		
Morley Borough Independent hold		Swing	+11.4	

Otley & Yeadon
Party	Candidate	Votes	%	±%
Liberal Democrats	Sandy Lay	3,259	43.6	+5.0
Labour	John Eveleigh	2,615	35.0	−1.7
Conservative	Makhan Thakur	947	12.7	−12.0
Green	Steven Crossan	474	6.3	+6.3
TUSC	Ryan Preston	176	2.4	+2.4
Majority		644	8.6	+6.7
Turnout		7,471		
Liberal Democrats hold		Swing	+3.3	

Pudsey
Party	Candidate	Votes	%	±%
Labour Co-op	Josie Jarosz*	3,312	59.2	+5.9
Conservative	Jason Aldiss	1,147	20.5	−8.4
UKIP	Paul Denner	811	14.5	+5.3
Liberal Democrats	Jude Arbuckle	320	5.7	+1.9
Majority		2,165	38.7	+14.2
Turnout		5,590		
Labour hold		Swing	+7.1	

Rothwell
Party	Candidate	Votes	%	±%
Labour	David Nagle	2,564	47.7	+1.6
Liberal Democrats	Don Wilson*	1,926	35.8	−1.9
Conservative	Daniel Farrell	399	7.4	−8.8
UKIP	David Daniel	366	6.8	+6.8
English Democrat	Bernie Allen	120	2.2	+2.2
Majority		638	11.9	+3.5
Turnout		5,375		
Labour gain from Liberal Democrats		Swing	+1.7	

Roundhay
Party	Candidate	Votes	%	±%
Labour	Bill Urry	3,556	52.4	+2.2
Conservative	Andy Paraskos	1,965	29.0	−4.3
Liberal Democrats	Michael Hurley	487	7.2	+0.4
Green	Paul Ellis	486	7.2	+0.6
Alliance for Green Socialism	Malcolm Scott	288	4.2	+1.1
Majority		1,591	23.5	+6.5
Turnout		6,782		
Labour gain from Conservative		Swing	+3.2	

Temple Newsam
Party	Candidate	Votes	%	±%
Labour	Judith Cummins	3,137	53.6	−0.8
Conservative	Bill Hyde*	1,505	25.7	−13.1
Independent	David Rudge	654	11.2	+11.2
English Democrat	Jordan Fawcett	370	6.3	+6.3
Liberal Democrats	Ian Dowling	192	3.3	−3.5
Majority		1,632	27.9	+12.4
Turnout		5,858		
Labour gain from Conservative		Swing	+6.1	

Weetwood
Party	Candidate	Votes	%	±%
Liberal Democrats	Jonathan Bentley	2,119	38.6	−0.6
Labour	Doreen Illingworth	1,762	32.1	+0.9
Conservative	Billy Flynn	818	14.9	−4.4
Green	Martin Hemingway	468	8.5	−0.4
English Democrat	Alan Procter	236	4.3	+4.3
Alliance for Green Socialism	Declan Normaschild	88	1.6	+1.6
Majority		357	6.5	−1.5
Turnout		5,491		
Liberal Democrats hold		Swing	-0.7	

Wetherby
Party	Candidate	Votes	%	±%
Conservative	Gerry Wilkinson*	3,123	55.9	−4.0
Labour	Scott Nicholson	1,286	23.0	−2.7
UKIP	David Macey	838	15.0	+8.4
Liberal Democrats	Benjamin Chapman	338	6.1	−1.7
Majority		1,837	32.9	−1.3
Turnout		5,585		
Conservative hold		Swing	-0.6	

== By-elections between 2012 and 2014 ==
Cross Gates & Whinmoor by-election 2 May 2013 replacing Suzi Armitage (deceased)
Party	Candidate	Votes	%	±%
Labour	Debra Coupar	2,481	49.4	−20.4
UKIP	Darren Oddy	1,582	31.5	+19.5
Conservative	Billy Flynn	587	11.7	+5.4
Green	Martin Hemingway	229	4.6	−0.1
Liberal Democrats	Keith Norman	145	2.9	−0.9
Majority		899	17.9	−39.9
Turnout		5,024		
Labour hold		Swing		
