= 2003 Leeds City Council election =

- 1 May 2003

33 of the 99 seats on Leeds City Council 50 seats needed for a majority
| | First party | Second party | Third party |
|---|---|---|---|
| Party | Labour | Conservative | Liberal Democrats |
| Last election | 19 seats, 41.4% | 7 seats, 29.2% | 5 seats, 22.3% |
| Seats won | 16 | 8 | 7 |
| Seats after | 52 | 22 | 20 |
| Seat change | ▼5 | ▲4 | Steady |
| Popular vote | 55,032 | 45,113 | 38,831 |
| Percentage | 35.5% | 29.1% | 25.0% |
| Swing | ▼5.9pp | ▼0.1pp | ▲2.7pp |
| | Fourth party |
| Party | Green |
| Last election | 1 seat, 4.5% |
| Seats won | 1 |
| Seats after | 3 |
| Seat change | Steady |
| Popular vote | 6,674 |
| Percentage | 4.3% |
| Swing | ▼0.2% |
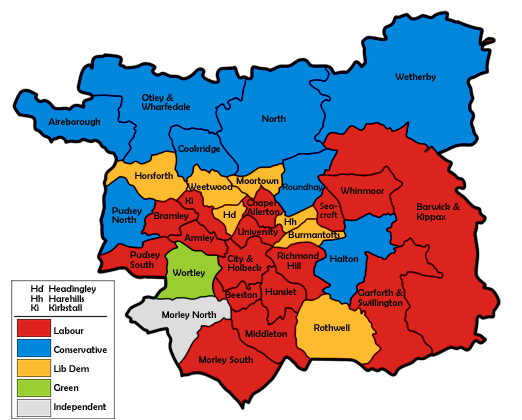
- Map of the results for the 2003 Leeds council election.

The 2003 Leeds City Council election took place on 1 May 2003 to elect members of City of Leeds Metropolitan Borough Council in West Yorkshire, England. One third of the council was up for election and the Labour Party stayed in overall control of the council.

== Election result ==
The results saw Labour just keep a majority on the council with 52 of the 99 seats. They suffered a net loss of 5 seats, including the leader of the council for the past 7 years, Brian Walker, who was defeated by the Liberal Democrats in Rothwell ward. The Conservatives gained the most seats to become the second largest party on the council with 22 seats, after making 4 gains in Aireborough, Halton, Otley and Wharfedale and Roundhay wards. As well as the gain in Rothwell, the Liberal Democrats also picked up a seat from Labour in Burmantofts but lost seats in Bramley and Otley and Wharfedale to Labour and Conservatives respectively.

Elsewhere independent Tom Leadley gained a seat from Labour in Morley North, while the Greens held their seat in Wortley. Turnout in the election dropped to just over 30% with some wards seeing under 20% voting, while the lowest turnout came in Headingley at only 15%.

Following the election the deputy leader of the council, Keith Wakefield, became leader unopposed after a meeting of the Labour group on the council.

Leeds local election result 2003
| Party | Seats | Gains | Losses | Net gain/loss | Seats % | Votes % | Votes | +/− |
|---|---|---|---|---|---|---|---|---|
| Labour | 16 | 1 | 6 | -5 | 48.5 | 35.5 | 55,032 | -5.9 |
| Conservative | 8 | 4 | 0 | +4 | 24.2 | 29.1 | 45,113 | -0.1 |
| Liberal Democrats | 7 | 2 | 2 | 0 | 21.2 | 25.0 | 38,831 | +2.7 |
| Green | 1 | 0 | 0 | 0 | 3.0 | 4.3 | 6,674 | -0.2 |
| Independent | 1 | 1 | 0 | +1 | 3.0 | 1.9 | 2,875 | +0.5 |
| BNP | 0 | 0 | 0 | 0 | 0.0 | 2.8 | 4,310 | +2.7 |
| Alliance for Green Socialism | 0 | 0 | 0 | 0 | 0.0 | 1.1 | 1,633 | +0.3 |
| Socialist Alliance | 0 | 0 | 0 | 0 | 0.0 | 0.3 | 428 | +0.1 |
| Socialist | 0 | 0 | 0 | 0 | 0.0 | 0.2 | 234 | +0.1 |

This result had the following consequences for the total number of seats on the council after the elections:

| Party | Previous council | New council |
|---|---|---|
| Labour | 57 | 52 |
| Conservative | 18 | 22 |
| Liberal Democrat | 20 | 20 |
| Green | 3 | 3 |
| Independent | 1 | 2 |
| Total | 99 | 99 |
| Working majority | 15 | 5 |

== Ward results ==
Aireborough
| Party | Candidate | Votes | % | ±% |
|---|---|---|---|---|
| Conservative | Stuart Andrew | 2,899 | 44.0 | −0.4 |
| Labour | Mike King | 2,652 | 40.2 | +2.5 |
| Liberal Democrats | Ian Hutton | 1,043 | 15.8 | −2.1 |
| Majority | | 247 | 3.8 | −2.9 |
| Turnout | | 6,594 | 34.0 | −3.9 |
| Conservative gain from Labour | | Swing | -1.4 | |

Armley
| Party | Candidate | Votes | % | ±% |
|---|---|---|---|---|
| Labour | Janet Harper | 1,676 | 49.3 | −6.7 |
| Conservative | Glenn Broadbent | 572 | 16.8 | −1.7 |
| Liberal Democrats | Stephen McBarron | 562 | 16.5 | +3.8 |
| Green | Luke Russell | 523 | 15.4 | +2.5 |
| Socialist Alliance | Isaac Lyne | 66 | 1.9 | +1.9 |
| Majority | | 1,104 | 32.5 | −5.0 |
| Turnout | | 3,399 | 23.0 | −0.8 |
| Labour hold | | Swing | -2.5 | |

Barwick & Kippax
| Party | Candidate | Votes | % | ±% |
|---|---|---|---|---|
| Labour | James Lewis | 2,950 | 44.2 | −11.6 |
| Conservative | Alec Shelbrooke | 2,364 | 35.4 | +3.8 |
| Liberal Democrats | Natasha De Vere | 622 | 9.3 | +0.6 |
| BNP | Christopher Andrews | 535 | 8.0 | +8.0 |
| Green | Elizabeth Holmes | 210 | 3.1 | +0.3 |
| Majority | | 586 | 8.8 | −15.4 |
| Turnout | | 6,681 | 36.0 | −2.3 |
| Labour hold | | Swing | -7.7 | |

Beeston
| Party | Candidate | Votes | % | ±% |
|---|---|---|---|---|
| Labour | Adam Ogilvie | 1,492 | 44.2 | −7.0 |
| Conservative | William Birch | 987 | 29.3 | −1.1 |
| BNP | Thomas Linden | 368 | 10.9 | +10.9 |
| Liberal Democrats | Kathleen Fenton | 366 | 10.9 | −1.6 |
| Green | Irene Draycup | 80 | 2.4 | −0.6 |
| Socialist Alliance | Philip Goodfield | 79 | 2.3 | −0.7 |
| Majority | | 505 | 14.9 | −5.9 |
| Turnout | | 3,372 | 28.5 | −0.4 |
| Labour hold | | Swing | -2.9 | |

Bramley
| Party | Candidate | Votes | % | ±% |
|---|---|---|---|---|
| Labour | Ted Hanley | 1,763 | 45.9 | −6.8 |
| Liberal Democrats | Julian Cummins | 1,520 | 39.5 | +5.8 |
| Conservative | Michael Best | 394 | 10.2 | +0.7 |
| Green | Francis Gray | 167 | 4.3 | +0.2 |
| Majority | | 243 | 6.4 | −12.6 |
| Turnout | | 3,844 | 23.5 | −0.4 |
| Labour gain from Liberal Democrats | | Swing | -6.3 | |

Burmantofts
| Party | Candidate | Votes | % | ±% |
|---|---|---|---|---|
| Liberal Democrats | Ralph Pryke | 1,706 | 49.6 | +5.6 |
| Labour | Geoffrey Holloran | 1,530 | 44.5 | −2.3 |
| Conservative | Patricia Hyde | 203 | 5.9 | −0.2 |
| Majority | | 176 | 5.1 | +2.3 |
| Turnout | | 3,439 | 28.3 | +0.9 |
| Liberal Democrats gain from Labour | | Swing | +3.9 | |

Chapel Allerton
| Party | Candidate | Votes | % | ±% |
|---|---|---|---|---|
| Labour | Norma Hutchinson | 1,697 | 41.9 | −10.7 |
| Alliance for Green Socialism | Garth Frankland | 947 | 23.4 | +2.0 |
| Liberal Democrats | Sitara Khan | 816 | 20.1 | +8.3 |
| Conservative | Roger Illingworth | 590 | 14.6 | +0.4 |
| Majority | | 750 | 18.5 | −12.7 |
| Turnout | | 4,050 | 28.1 | −3.3 |
| Labour hold | | Swing | -5.3 | |

City & Holbeck
| Party | Candidate | Votes | % | ±% |
|---|---|---|---|---|
| Labour | Mohammed Iqbal | 1,292 | 48.1 | −13.5 |
| Liberal Democrats | Eric Scott | 525 | 19.5 | +9.0 |
| Conservative | Michael Wheeler | 421 | 15.7 | −5.5 |
| Socialist | David Jones | 234 | 8.7 | +2.0 |
| Green | Janet Pritchard | 216 | 8.0 | +8.0 |
| Majority | | 767 | 28.6 | −11.8 |
| Turnout | | 2,688 | 18.0 | −2.0 |
| Labour hold | | Swing | -11.2 | |

Cookridge
| Party | Candidate | Votes | % | ±% |
|---|---|---|---|---|
| Conservative | Barry Anderson | 3,336 | 52.8 | −1.0 |
| Liberal Democrats | Sue Bentley | 1,903 | 30.1 | +10.4 |
| Labour | Patrick Hennigan | 1,083 | 17.1 | −5.7 |
| Majority | | 1,433 | 22.7 | −8.3 |
| Turnout | | 6,322 | 38.0 | +1.0 |
| Conservative hold | | Swing | -5.7 | |

Garforth & Swillington
| Party | Candidate | Votes | % | ±% |
|---|---|---|---|---|
| Labour | Andrea Harrison | 2,876 | 46.0 | −5.6 |
| Conservative | Robert Semple | 1,631 | 26.1 | −4.8 |
| Liberal Democrats | Ian Dowling | 1,095 | 17.5 | −0.1 |
| BNP | Tracy Andrews | 656 | 10.5 | +10.5 |
| Majority | | 1,245 | 19.9 | −0.8 |
| Turnout | | 6,258 | 33.0 | −0.8 |
| Labour hold | | Swing | -0.4 | |

Halton
| Party | Candidate | Votes | % | ±% |
|---|---|---|---|---|
| Conservative | David Schofield | 2,902 | 48.2 | +7.1 |
| Labour | Doris McGee | 2,134 | 35.4 | −8.0 |
| Liberal Democrats | David Hollingsworth | 989 | 16.4 | +4.4 |
| Majority | | 768 | 12.8 | +10.5 |
| Turnout | | 6,025 | 34.0 | +0.1 |
| Conservative gain from Labour | | Swing | +7.5 | |

Harehills
| Party | Candidate | Votes | % | ±% |
|---|---|---|---|---|
| Liberal Democrats | Alan Taylor | 2,683 | 59.9 | +20.3 |
| Labour | John Clare | 1,491 | 33.3 | −18.5 |
| Conservative | Karl Steenson | 174 | 3.9 | +0.9 |
| Alliance for Green Socialism | Azar Iqbal | 128 | 2.9 | +2.9 |
| Majority | | 1,192 | 26.6 | +14.4 |
| Turnout | | 4,476 | 33.4 | −7.1 |
| Liberal Democrats hold | | Swing | +19.4 | |

Headingley
| Party | Candidate | Votes | % | ±% |
|---|---|---|---|---|
| Liberal Democrats | Gregory Mulholland | 1,668 | 52.4 | +3.7 |
| Labour | Safdar Hussain | 764 | 24.0 | −5.8 |
| Green | Lesley Jeffries | 351 | 11.0 | +0.9 |
| Conservative | Richard Smith | 241 | 7.6 | +0.1 |
| Socialist Alliance | Katherine Owen | 158 | 5.0 | +1.0 |
| Majority | | 904 | 28.4 | +9.5 |
| Turnout | | 3,182 | 15.5 | −3.3 |
| Liberal Democrats hold | | Swing | +4.7 | |

Horsforth
| Party | Candidate | Votes | % | ±% |
|---|---|---|---|---|
| Liberal Democrats | Brian Cleasby | 2,404 | 43.2 | −1.0 |
| Conservative | Neil Hunt | 1,997 | 35.9 | +1.6 |
| Labour | Tony Addison | 884 | 15.9 | −1.9 |
| Green | Andrea Binns | 280 | 5.0 | +1.3 |
| Majority | | 407 | 7.3 | −2.6 |
| Turnout | | 5,565 | 33.1 | −2.9 |
| Liberal Democrats hold | | Swing | -1.3 | |

Hunslet
| Party | Candidate | Votes | % | ±% |
|---|---|---|---|---|
| Labour | John Erskine | 1,264 | 63.3 | −4.9 |
| Liberal Democrats | Ann Norman | 320 | 16.0 | +2.5 |
| Conservative | Anthony Larvin | 290 | 14.5 | +2.1 |
| Green | Catherine Harmer | 122 | 6.1 | +2.3 |
| Majority | | 944 | 47.3 | −7.4 |
| Turnout | | 1,996 | 18.6 | −2.0 |
| Labour hold | | Swing | -3.7 | |

Kirkstall
| Party | Candidate | Votes | % | ±% |
|---|---|---|---|---|
| Labour | John Illingworth | 1,580 | 45.7 | −11.9 |
| Liberal Democrats | Toby Fursdon | 1,080 | 31.2 | +15.4 |
| Conservative | Charles Moore | 406 | 11.7 | −2.0 |
| Green | Martin Reed | 391 | 11.3 | −1.6 |
| Majority | | 500 | 14.5 | −27.4 |
| Turnout | | 3,457 | 22.9 | −2.1 |
| Labour hold | | Swing | -13.6 | |

Middleton
| Party | Candidate | Votes | % | ±% |
|---|---|---|---|---|
| Labour | Stuart Bruce | 1,630 | 55.0 | −8.6 |
| Conservative | David Boynton | 697 | 23.5 | +5.9 |
| Liberal Democrats | Sadie Fisher | 445 | 15.0 | +1.9 |
| Green | Patricia Capstick | 191 | 6.4 | +0.7 |
| Majority | | 933 | 31.5 | −14.5 |
| Turnout | | 2,963 | 19.9 | −1.8 |
| Labour hold | | Swing | -7.2 | |

Moortown
| Party | Candidate | Votes | % | ±% |
|---|---|---|---|---|
| Liberal Democrats | Richard Harker | 2,637 | 51.8 | −3.4 |
| Labour | David Dresser | 1,303 | 25.6 | −0.9 |
| Conservative | Peter Knowles | 936 | 18.4 | +2.4 |
| Alliance for Green Socialism | Michael Davies | 215 | 4.2 | +0.9 |
| Majority | | 1,334 | 26.2 | −2.5 |
| Turnout | | 5,091 | 31.6 | −3.7 |
| Liberal Democrats hold | | Swing | -1.2 | |

Morley North
| Party | Candidate | Votes | % | ±% |
|---|---|---|---|---|
| Independent | Thomas Leadley | 2,473 | 42.3 | +4.5 |
| Labour | Alex Sobel | 1,809 | 30.9 | +1.0 |
| Conservative | Stephen Kearns | 1,126 | 19.2 | −3.7 |
| Liberal Democrats | Christine Golton | 442 | 7.6 | +0.7 |
| Majority | | 664 | 11.4 | +3.5 |
| Turnout | | 5,850 | 30.3 | −0.2 |
| Independent gain from Labour | | Swing | +1.7 | |

Morley South
| Party | Candidate | Votes | % | ±% |
|---|---|---|---|---|
| Labour | Debra Coupar | 2,033 | 36.3 | −16.9 |
| Conservative | Judith Elliott | 1,484 | 26.5 | −2.5 |
| BNP | Christopher Beverley | 1,064 | 19.0 | +19.0 |
| Liberal Democrats | Rochelle Harris | 621 | 11.1 | −6.7 |
| Independent | Charles Slingsby | 402 | 7.2 | +7.2 |
| Majority | | 549 | 9.8 | −14.4 |
| Turnout | | 5,604 | 25.1 | +2.7 |
| Labour hold | | Swing | -7.2 | |

North
| Party | Candidate | Votes | % | ±% |
|---|---|---|---|---|
| Conservative | Ruth Feldman | 2,561 | 43.5 | −2.2 |
| Liberal Democrats | Judith Chapman | 2,272 | 38.6 | +3.3 |
| Labour | Doreen Illingworth | 957 | 16.3 | −1.9 |
| Alliance for Green Socialism | Brian Jackson | 95 | 1.6 | +0.8 |
| Majority | | 289 | 4.9 | −5.5 |
| Turnout | | 5,885 | 35.0 | −3.8 |
| Conservative hold | | Swing | -2.7 | |

Otley & Wharfedale
| Party | Candidate | Votes | % | ±% |
|---|---|---|---|---|
| Conservative | Gerard Francis | 2,790 | 38.1 | −6.1 |
| Liberal Democrats | Graham Kirkland | 2,581 | 35.2 | +12.0 |
| Labour | John Eveleigh | 1,615 | 22.1 | −7.2 |
| Green | Paul Marchant | 338 | 4.6 | +1.2 |
| Majority | | 209 | 2.9 | −12.0 |
| Turnout | | 7,324 | 38.4 | −2.4 |
| Conservative gain from Liberal Democrats | | Swing | -9.0 | |

Pudsey North
| Party | Candidate | Votes | % | ±% |
|---|---|---|---|---|
| Conservative | Amanda Carter | 3,827 | 63.2 | +11.1 |
| Labour | Tina Davy | 1,383 | 22.8 | −9.4 |
| Liberal Democrats | Christine Glover | 850 | 14.0 | +1.6 |
| Majority | | 2,444 | 40.4 | +20.5 |
| Turnout | | 6,060 | 34.0 | −3.7 |
| Conservative hold | | Swing | +10.2 | |

Pudsey South
| Party | Candidate | Votes | % | ±% |
|---|---|---|---|---|
| Labour | Josephine Jarosz | 2,270 | 42.9 | −5.2 |
| Conservative | Jason Aldiss | 1,768 | 33.4 | −2.8 |
| Liberal Democrats | John Burke | 637 | 12.0 | +0.4 |
| BNP | Richard Warrington | 437 | 8.3 | +8.3 |
| Green | Yvonne Clarke | 179 | 3.4 | −0.8 |
| Majority | | 502 | 9.5 | −2.4 |
| Turnout | | 5,291 | 31.8 | −1.5 |
| Labour hold | | Swing | -1.2 | |

Richmond Hill
| Party | Candidate | Votes | % | ±% |
|---|---|---|---|---|
| Labour | Marlene Lyons | 1,509 | 54.5 | −16.6 |
| BNP | Mark Collett | 550 | 19.9 | +19.9 |
| Liberal Democrats | Keith Norman | 483 | 17.5 | +1.8 |
| Conservative | Simon Church | 225 | 8.1 | −1.8 |
| Majority | | 959 | 44.6 | −10.8 |
| Turnout | | 2,767 | 23.3 | −3.6 |
| Labour hold | | Swing | -18.2 | |

Rothwell
| Party | Candidate | Votes | % | ±% |
|---|---|---|---|---|
| Liberal Democrats | Steve Smith | 2,495 | 49.4 | +1.2 |
| Labour | Brian Walker | 2,109 | 41.7 | +0.9 |
| Conservative | Caroline Judge | 451 | 8.9 | −2.1 |
| Majority | | 386 | 7.7 | +0.3 |
| Turnout | | 5,055 | 31.5 | −2.6 |
| Liberal Democrats gain from Labour | | Swing | +0.1 | |

Roundhay
| Party | Candidate | Votes | % | ±% |
|---|---|---|---|---|
| Conservative | Matthew Lobley | 2,417 | 39.6 | −1.4 |
| Labour | Michael Fox | 2,347 | 38.4 | −1.3 |
| Liberal Democrats | John Skinner | 901 | 14.8 | +1.0 |
| Green | Paul Ellis | 260 | 4.3 | +0.7 |
| Alliance for Green Socialism | Malcolm Christie | 180 | 2.9 | +1.0 |
| Majority | | 70 | 1.1 | −0.2 |
| Turnout | | 6,105 | 37.2 | −2.1 |
| Conservative gain from Labour | | Swing | -0.0 | |

Seacroft
| Party | Candidate | Votes | % | ±% |
|---|---|---|---|---|
| Labour | Brian Selby | 2,003 | 66.3 | −13.9 |
| Liberal Democrats | Pauline Davies | 403 | 13.3 | −5.0 |
| BNP | Alistair Ingham | 356 | 11.8 | +11.8 |
| Conservative | Donald Townsley | 261 | 8.6 | +7.1 |
| Majority | | 1,600 | 52.9 | −9.0 |
| Turnout | | 3,023 | 26.0 | +2.5 |
| Labour hold | | Swing | -4.4 | |

University
| Party | Candidate | Votes | % | ±% |
|---|---|---|---|---|
| Labour | Gerald Harper | 1,000 | 41.8 | −15.1 |
| Liberal Democrats | Joan Ewens | 930 | 38.9 | +18.7 |
| Conservative | Robert Winfield | 185 | 7.7 | −5.9 |
| Green | Bluebell Eikonoklastes | 153 | 6.4 | −2.8 |
| Socialist Alliance | Steven Skinner | 125 | 5.2 | +5.2 |
| Majority | | 70 | 2.9 | −33.8 |
| Turnout | | 2,393 | 15.3 | −1.3 |
| Labour hold | | Swing | -16.9 | |

Weetwood
| Party | Candidate | Votes | % | ±% |
|---|---|---|---|---|
| Liberal Democrats | Brian Jennings | 2,196 | 45.5 | +0.8 |
| Labour | Dudley Parker | 1,336 | 27.7 | −4.0 |
| Conservative | Timothy Metcalfe | 922 | 19.1 | +1.6 |
| Green | David Webb | 370 | 7.7 | +1.6 |
| Majority | | 860 | 17.8 | +4.8 |
| Turnout | | 4,824 | 29.5 | −4.9 |
| Liberal Democrats hold | | Swing | +2.4 | |

Wetherby
| Party | Candidate | Votes | % | ±% |
|---|---|---|---|---|
| Conservative | Andrew Millard | 4,644 | 66.0 | +0.0 |
| Labour | Reginald Steel | 1,493 | 21.2 | +0.1 |
| Liberal Democrats | Edmund Conybeare | 899 | 12.8 | +0.0 |
| Majority | | 3,151 | 44.8 | −0.1 |
| Turnout | | 7,036 | 34.3 | −2.3 |
| Conservative hold | | Swing | -0.0 | |

Whinmoor
| Party | Candidate | Votes | % | ±% |
|---|---|---|---|---|
| Labour | Peter Gruen | 1,868 | 49.7 | −4.8 |
| Conservative | Graeme Shaw | 989 | 26.3 | −7.5 |
| Liberal Democrats | Colin Campbell | 486 | 12.9 | +1.2 |
| BNP | Marten Gibson | 344 | 9.2 | +9.2 |
| Alliance for Green Socialism | Amanda Munro | 68 | 1.8 | +1.8 |
| Majority | | 879 | 23.4 | +2.7 |
| Turnout | | 3,755 | 30.2 | −2.1 |
| Labour hold | | Swing | +1.3 | |

Wortley
| Party | Candidate | Votes | % | ±% |
|---|---|---|---|---|
| Green | David Blackburn | 2,843 | 59.8 | +5.8 |
| Labour | Jane Dowson | 1,239 | 26.1 | −5.7 |
| Conservative | Victoria Richmond | 423 | 8.9 | −1.0 |
| Liberal Democrats | Leanne Winfield | 251 | 5.3 | +1.0 |
| Majority | | 1,604 | 33.7 | +11.5 |
| Turnout | | 4,756 | 27.9 | −1.8 |
| Green hold | | Swing | +5.7 | |
