= 2018 Leeds City Council election =

- 3 May 2018

All 99 seats on Leeds City Council 50 seats needed for a majority
- Turnout: 34.5% (▼0.2%) (Note: Turnout has been calculated based on the published full results for 32 of the 33 Leeds City Council wards, with the turnout in Wetherby ward still to be published.)
	First party	Second party	Third party
Leader	Judith Blake	Andrew Carter
Party	Labour	Conservative	Liberal Democrats
Last election	21 seats, 43.0%	6 seats, 27.4%	3 seats, 10.0%
Seats before	58	19	9
Seats won	61	22	6
Seat change	▼2	▲3	▼3
Popular vote	250,241	152,316	52,235
Percentage	46.4%	28.2%	9.6%
Swing	▲3.4pp	▲5.2pp	▼0.4pp
	Fourth party	Fifth party	Sixth party
Party	Morley Borough Independents	Garforth and Swillington Independents	Green
Last election	2 seats, 2.8%	New party	1 seats, 7.1%
Seats before	5	2	3
Seats won	5	3	2
Seat change	Steady	▲3	▼1
Popular vote	15,822	14,476	32,955
Percentage	2.9%	2.6%	6.1%
Swing	▲0.1pp	N/A	▼1.0pp
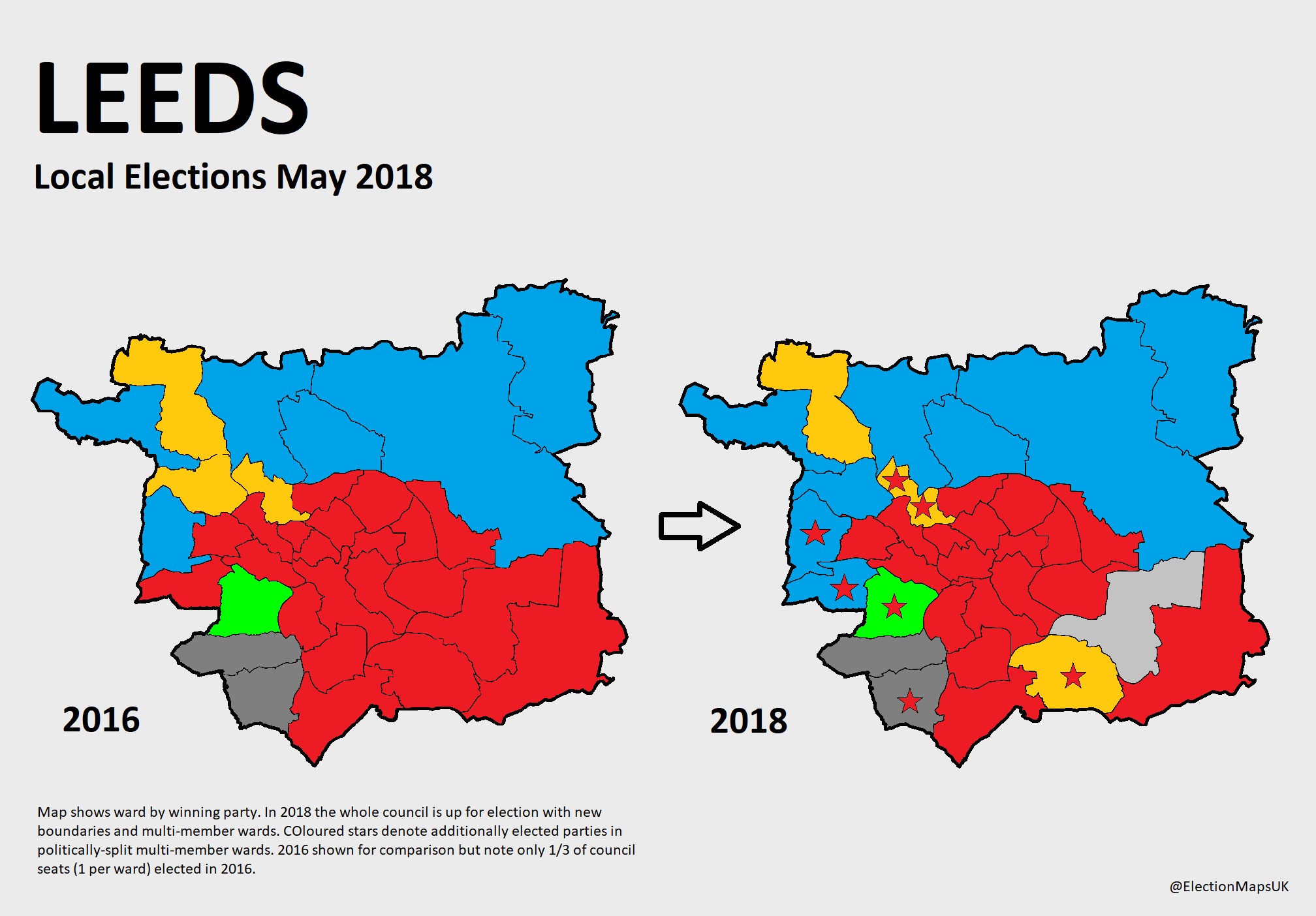
- Labour in red (61), Conservatives in blue (22), Liberal Democrats in yellow (6), Morley Borough Independents in dark grey (5), Garforth & Swillington Independents in light grey (3) and Greens in bright green (2).
Council control before election
Majority administration
Labour
Council control after election
Majority administration
Labour

The 2018 Leeds City Council election took place on Thursday 3 May 2018 to elect members of Leeds City Council in England. It was held on the same day as other UK local elections across England.

Following a full boundary review of Leeds' 33 electoral wards by the Local Government Boundary Commission, the all-out election saw all of the council's 99 available council seats contested based on the new ward boundaries. Three of the previous wards were abolished and replaced (City & Hunslet, Headingley, and Hyde Park & Woodhouse for Headingley & Hyde Park, Hunslet & Riverside and Little London & Woodhouse). The last all-out election in Leeds was in 2004 after the previous full ward boundary review in 2003.

With three seats available for each ward, electors were able to cast up to three votes for three different candidates. The first three candidates past the post in each ward won a council seat.

The Labour Party won the election with 61 of the 99 council seats.

== Election summary ==
Leeds City Council Election Result 2018
Party	Candidates						Votes		
Party	Stood	Elected	Gained	Unseated	Net	% of total	%	No.	Net %
Labour	99	61	4	6	▼2	61.6	46.4	250,241	+3.4
Conservative	98	22	4	1	▲3	22.2	28.2	152,316	+5.2
Liberal Democrats	56	6	1	4	▼3	6.1	9.6	52,235	-0.4
Green	37	2	0	1	▼1	2.0	6.1	32,955	-1.0
Morley Borough Independent	6	5	0	0	0	5.1	2.9	15,822	+0.1
Garforth and Swillington Independents	3	3	3	0	▲3	3.0	2.6	14,476	New
Save Our Beeston and Holbeck Independents	3	0	0	0	0	0.0	0.7	3,800	New
Independent	4	0	0	0	0	0.0	0.7	3,651	+0.3
East Leeds Independents	3	0	0	0	0	0.0	0.5	3,208	New
Yorkshire	3	0	0	0	0	0.0	0.4	2,638	-0.2
UKIP	7	0	0	0	0	0.0	0.4	2,458	-12.1
For Britain	6	0	0	0	0	0.0	0.2	1,559	New
SDP	1	0	0	0	0	0.0	0.2	1,232	New
Alliance for Green Socialism	3	0	0	0	0	0.0	0.1	963	-0.2
TUSC	3	0	0	0	0	0.0	0.1	610	-0.1
Democrats and Veterans	2	0	0	0	0	0.0	0.0	445	New
Women's Equality	1	0	0	0	0	0.0	0.0	394	New
Total	335	99	12	12	0	100.0	100.0	539,003	▲354,327

This result had the following consequences for the total number of seats on the council after the elections:

Party	2016 election	Prior to election	New council
Labour	63	58	61
Conservative	19	19	22
Liberal Democrat	9	9	6
Morley Borough Independents	5	5	5
Green	3	3	2
Garforth and Swillington Independents	0	2	3
East Leeds Independents	0	2	0
Independent	0	1	0
Total	99	99	99
Working majority	25	17	23

== Councillors who did not stand for re-election ==
Councillor/s who did not stand for re-election (20)
Councillor	Ward	First elected	Party	Reason	Successor
David Congreve	Beeston & Holbeck	1990	Labour	stood down	Andrew Scopes (Labour)
Adam Ogilvie	Beeston & Holbeck	1999	Labour	stood down	Gohar Almass (Labour)
Terry Wilford	Farnley & Wortley	2014	Green	stood down	Matt Gibson (Labour)
Stuart McKenna	Garforth & Swillington	2014	Labour	stood down	Suzanne McCormack (Garforth and Swillington Independents)
Rachael Procter	Harewood	2004	Conservative	deselected	Samuel Firth (Conservative)
Christopher Townsley	Horsforth	1991, 1994	Liberal Democrats	stood down	Jackie Shemilt (Conservative)
Brian Cleasby	Horsforth	1995	Liberal Democrats	stood down	Jonathon Taylor (Conservative)
Patrick Davey	City & Holbeck (ward abolished)	2002	Labour	lost selection for new ward	Paul Wray (Labour)
Graham Hyde	Killingbeck & Seacroft	1992	Labour	stood down	Paul Drinkwater (Labour)
Brian Selby	Killingbeck & Seacroft	1999	Labour	stood down	Katie Dye (Labour)
Lucinda Yeadon	Kirkstall	2008	Labour	stood down	Hannah Bithell (Labour)
Christine Towler	Hyde Park & Woodhouse (ward abolished)	2012	Labour	stood down	Kayleigh Brooks (Labour)
Alex Sobel	Moortown	2012	Labour	stood down	Mohammed Shahzad (Labour)
Shirley Varley	Morley South	2010	Morley Borough Independents	stood down	Wyn Kidger (Morley Borough Independents)
Josephine Jarosz	Pudsey	1995	Labour	stood down	Simon Seary (Conservative)
Ghulam Hussain	Roundhay	2010	Labour	stood down	Jacob Goddard (Labour)
Christine MacNiven	Roundhay	2011	Labour	stood down	Angela Wenham (Labour)
Sue Bentley	Weetwood	2004	Liberal Democrats	stood down	Christine Knight (Labour)
Judith Chapman	Weetwood	2006	Liberal Democrats	stood down	James Gibson (Labour)
John Procter	Wetherby	1992	Conservative	deselected	Norma Harrington (Conservative)

Incumbent Morley Borough Independent councillor, Robert Finnigan, did not stand in the ward he represented, Morley North. Instead, he stood in the neighbouring ward of Morley South Ward. However, Finnigan was subsequently not elected at the election for the ward.

== Ward results ==
Three councillors were elected for each of the wards.

An asterisk (*) denotes an incumbent councillor who stood again at the election, having 21 sitting councillors not stood again for their seats.

The percentage vote share (%) is calculated by counting only the highest-scoring candidate for each party and individual independent candidates. For example, the total number of votes cast by electors in the Adel & Wharfedale ward for Barry Anderson (the highest-scoring Conservative candidate), Nigel Gill (Labour), Peter Jackson (Liberal Democrat) and Liddy Swales (sole Green candidate) was 7,980. As Anderson gained 4,856 votes, he took 61.5% of the 7,980 total possible ballots cast, whilst Gill gained 1,556 votes and 19.7% of the total votes cast.

The percentage change (±) is the proportion by which the individual party and/or candidate's vote share increased or decreased from the previous council election in 2016.

The turnout is the amount of registered electors who voted in the ward at the time of the election. The turnout percentage (%) is the proportion of registered electors in the ward who voted on the day of the election.

=== Adel & Wharfedale ===
Adel & Wharfedale (3)
Party	Candidate	Votes	%	±%
Conservative	Barry Anderson*	4,856	67.3	
Conservative	Caroline Anderson*	4,269	59.2	
Conservative	Billy Flynn*	3,881	53.8	
Labour	Nigel Gill	1,556	21.6	
Labour	Geraldine Montgomerie	1,435	19.9	
Labour	Andy Rontree	1,264	17.5	
Liberal Democrats	Peter Jackson	977	13.5	
Liberal Democrats	Jane Trewhella	883	12.2	
Liberal Democrats	Ed Thornley	715	9.9	
Green	Liddy Swales	591	8.2	
Majority		3,300		
Turnout		7,211	45.2	−0.3
Conservative hold		Swing		
Conservative hold		Swing		
Conservative hold		Swing		

=== Alwoodley ===
Alwoodley (3)
Party	Candidate	Votes	%	±%
Conservative	Dan Cohen*	4,209	57.6	
Conservative	Neil Buckley*	4,111	56.3	
Conservative	Peter Harrand*	3,896	53.3	
Labour	Keith White	2,389	32.7	
Labour	Claude Hendrickson	2,141	29.3	
Labour	Mumtaz Khan	2,019	27.6	
Green	Miriam Moss	639	8.7	
Liberal Democrats	Roderic Parker	633	8.7	
Alliance for Green Socialism	Brian Jackson	194	2.7	
Majority		1,722		
Turnout		7,306	41.5	+3.4
Conservative hold		Swing		
Conservative hold		Swing		
Conservative hold		Swing		

=== Ardsley & Robin Hood ===
Labour councillor Ben Garner replaced independent Councillor Jack Dunn, who had resigned the Labour Whip and left the Labour Group on the council in January 2018.

Ardsley & Robin Hood (3)
Party	Candidate	Votes	%	±%
Labour Co-op	Karen Renshaw*	2,371	43.9	
Labour Co-op	Ben Garner	2,074	38.4	
Labour Co-op	Lisa Mulherin*	2,013	37.2	
Conservative	Mike Foster	1,897	35.1	
Independent	Jack Dunn*	1,694	31.3	
Conservative	Kirsty Baldwin	1,686	31.2	
Conservative	Cameron Stephenson	1,610	29.8	
Green	Emma Carter	503	9.3	
Liberal Democrats	George Hall	332	6.1	
Majority		474		
Turnout		5,406	30.9	+2.4
Labour Co-op hold		Swing		
Labour Co-op hold		Swing		
Labour Co-op hold		Swing		

=== Armley ===
Armley (3)
Party	Candidate	Votes	%	±%
Labour	Alice Smart*	2,747	61.4	
Labour	James McKenna*	2,632	58.8	
Labour	Alison Lowe*	2,447	54.7	
Green	Andrea Binns	732	16.4	
Conservative	Matthew Leech	657	14.7	
Conservative	Nicola Tinsley	565	12.6	
Green	Gideon Jones	545	12.2	
Conservative	Robert Murphy-Fell	522	11.7	
Liberal Democrats	Dan Walker	387	8.7	
For Britain	James Miller	261	5.8	
Democrats and Veterans	John Withill	184	4.1	
TUSC	Rob Hooper	175	3.9	
Majority		2,015		
Turnout		4,473	26.8	−2.3
Labour hold		Swing		
Labour hold		Swing		
Labour hold		Swing		

=== Beeston & Holbeck ===
Beeston & Holbeck (3)
Party	Candidate	Votes	%	±%
Labour	Angela Gabriel*	2,593	53.3	
Labour	Gohar Almass	2,471	50.8	
Labour	Andrew Scopes	2,257	46.4	
Save Our Beeston and Holbeck Independents	Bill Birch	1,281	26.3	
Save Our Beeston and Holbeck Independents	Laura Walton	1,269	26.1	
Save Our Beeston and Holbeck Independents	Sean Sturman	1,250	25.7	
Conservative	Robert Winfield	495	10.2	
Conservative	Lyn Buckley	464	9.5	
Conservative	Ian Robertson	395	8.1	
Green	Owen Brear	343	7.1	
Liberal Democrats	Jarrod Gaines	197	4.1	
Liberal Democrats	Robert Durdin	159	3.3	
Majority		1,312		
Turnout		4,862	28.8	+0.5
Labour hold		Swing		
Labour hold		Swing		
Labour hold		Swing		

=== Bramley & Stanningley ===
Bramley & Stanningley (3)
Party	Candidate	Votes	%	±%
Labour	Kevin Ritchie*	2,905	65.6	
Labour	Caroline Gruen*	2,560	57.9	
Labour	Julie Heselwood*	2,529	57.2	
Conservative	Ovidiu Caprariu	772	17.4	
Conservative	Alexander Nancolas	710	16.0	
Conservative	Neil Hunt	692	15.6	
Green	Clive Lord	573	12.9	
Liberal Democrats	Elizabeth Bee	528	11.9	
For Britain	Anne Murgatroyd	489	11.1	
Majority		2,133		
Turnout		4,425	26.2	−3.0
Labour hold		Swing		
Labour hold		Swing		
Labour hold		Swing		

=== Burmantofts & Richmond Hill ===
Burmantofts & Richmond Hill (3)
Party	Candidate	Votes	%	±%
Labour	Ron Grahame*	2,756	68.2	
Labour	Asghar Khan*	2,577	63.8	
Labour	Denise Ragan*	2,442	60.5	
East Leeds Independents	Geoff Holloran	678	16.8	
Liberal Democrats	David Hollingsworth	613	15.2	
Green	Paul Marchant	428	10.6	
Conservative	Alexander Passingham	363	9.0	
Conservative	Peter Lord	327	8.1	
Conservative	Robin Rogers	294	7.3	
Majority		2,078		
Turnout		4,039	24.8	−2.5
Labour hold		Swing		
Labour hold		Swing		
Labour hold		Swing		

=== Calverley & Farsley ===
Former Joint Leader of the Council and long-standing Leader of the Conservative Group, Andrew Carter CBE, and his wife, Amanda Carter, were re-elected. Their fellow incumbent, Rod Wood, lost out to Peter Carlill of Labour by 47 votes.

Calverley & Farsley (3)
Party	Candidate	Votes	%	±%
Conservative	Andrew Carter*	3,972	53.8	
Conservative	Amanda Carter*	3,716	50.3	
Labour	Peter Carlill	3,086	41.8	
Conservative	Roderic Wood*	3,039	41.1	
Labour	Nicole Sharpe	2,597	35.2	
Labour	Naheem Alam	2,483	33.6	
Green	Ellen Graham	733	9.9	
Liberal Democrats	Kate Arbuckle	387	5.2	
Liberal Democrats	Robert Jacques	220	3.0	
Liberal Democrats	Benedict Chastney	190	2.6	
Majority		886		
Turnout		7,386	40.6	+1.0
Conservative hold		Swing		
Conservative hold		Swing		
Labour gain from Conservative		Swing		

=== Chapel Allerton ===
All three incumbent Labour councillors were re-elected, including incumbent Lord Mayor of Leeds Jane Dowson.

Chapel Allerton (3)
Party	Candidate	Votes	%	±%
Labour	Eileen Taylor*	4,809	70.6	
Labour	Mohammed Rafique*	4,728	69.5	
Labour	Jane Dowson*	4,708	69.2	
Green	Justine Merton-Scott	907	13.3	
Green	Bobak Walker	703	10.3	
Conservative	Kevin Black	672	9.9	
Liberal Democrats	Susan Harris	608	8.9	
Conservative	Linda Feldman	604	8.9	
Conservative	David Myers	565	8.3	
Alliance for Green Socialism	Mike Davies	379	5.6	
Majority		3,902		
Turnout		6,807	38.1	+2.1
Labour hold		Swing		
Labour hold		Swing		
Labour hold		Swing		

=== Cross Gates & Whinmoor ===
Jessica Lennox (Labour) defeated independent Janette Walker. Walker had been a Labour councillor since her first election in 2012 and left the Labour Group on the council in early 2017 to run as an independent.

Cross Gates & Whinmoor (3)
Party	Candidate	Votes	%	±%
Labour	Pauline Grahame*	2,815	48.6	
Labour	Peter Gruen*	2,501	43.2	
Labour	Jessica Lennox	2,175	37.6	
East Leeds Independents	Janette Walker*	1,525	26.3	
Conservative	Dorothy Schofield	1,485	25.6	
Conservative	Paula Hayes	1,340	23.1	
Conservative	Andrew Martin	1,142	19.7	
Green	Elizabeth Fellows	557	9.6	
UKIP	Harvey Alexander	519	9.0	
UKIP	Peter Morgan	414	7.2	
Liberal Democrats	Thomas Shakespeare	340	5.9	
Democrats and Veterans	Mark Maniatt	261	4.5	
For Britain	Stuart Nicholson	238	4.1	
Majority		1,290		
Turnout		5,790	31.8	−0.6
Labour hold		Swing		
Labour hold		Swing		
Labour hold		Swing		

=== Farnley & Wortley ===
Farnley & Wortley (3)
Party	Candidate	Votes	%	±%
Green	Ann Blackburn*	2,461	45.4	
Green	David Blackburn*	2,424	44.7	
Labour	Matt Gibson	2,151	39.7	
Labour	Andrea McKenna	1,991	36.7	
Labour	Andy Parnham	1,989	36.7	
Green	Stuart Haley	1,984	36.6	
Conservative	Hayley Nancolas	685	12.6	
Conservative	Dorothy Flynn	643	11.9	
Conservative	John Hardcastle	615	11.3	
For Britain	Sam Melia	162	3.0	
Liberal Democrats	Rosemary Spencer	160	3.0	
Majority		310		
Turnout		5,423	30.2	−0.2
Green hold		Swing		
Green hold		Swing		
Labour gain from Green		Swing		

=== Garforth & Swillington ===
Both Independent incumbents, Mark Dobson and Sarah Field, were elected to the council alongside fellow independent, Suzanne McCormack, who replaced retiring Labour Councillor Stuart McKenna. Both Dobson and Field had been elected as Labour Councillors but resigned from the Labour Council Group in February 2017 to stand as independents.

Garforth & Swillington (3)
Party	Candidate	Votes	%	±%
Garforth and Swillington Independents	Mark Dobson*	5,377	66.9	
Garforth and Swillington Independents	Sarah Field*	4,738	58.9	
Garforth and Swillington Independents	Suzanne McCormack	4,361	54.3	
Labour	Annie Maloney	1,512	18.8	
Labour	Mark Pratt	1,505	18.7	
Conservative	Joseph Blunt	1,358	16.9	
Labour	Mirelle Midgley	1,354	16.8	
Conservative	Linda Richards	1,311	16.3	
Conservative	Jordan Young	1,181	14.7	
Liberal Democrats	Christine Golton	190	2.4	
For Britain	Michael Bolton	168	2.1	
Majority		3,865		
Turnout		8,038	49.7	+9.1
Garforth and Swillington Independents gain from Labour				
Garforth and Swillington Independents gain from Labour				
Garforth and Swillington Independents gain from Labour				

=== Gipton & Harehills ===
Gipton & Harehills (3)
Party	Candidate	Votes	%	±%
Labour	Salma Arif*	4,020	77.8	
Labour	Arif Hussain*	3,797	73.5	
Labour	Kamila Maqsood*	3,524	68.2	
Conservative	Robert Harris	411	8.0	
Green	Colin Noble	394	7.6	
Liberal Democrats	Heidi Farrar	370	7.2	
TUSC	Iain Dalton	357	6.9	
Conservative	Matthew Labbee	323	6.2	
Independent	Shaff Sheikh	269	5.2	
Conservative	Vajinder Singh	218	4.2	
Majority		3,609		
Turnout		5,169	31.3	−1.3
Labour hold		Swing		
Labour hold		Swing		
Labour hold		Swing		

=== Guiseley & Rawdon ===
All three incumbent Conservative councillors were re-elected, including Lord Mayor of Leeds-elect Graham Latty.

Guiseley & Rawdon (3)
Party	Candidate	Votes	%	±%
Conservative	Graham Latty*	3,714	47.5	
Conservative	Pat Latty*	3,483	44.5	
Conservative	Paul Wadsworth*	3,286	42.0	
Labour Co-op	Kirsty McKay	2,693	34.4	
Labour Co-op	Andrew Thomson	2,597	33.2	
Labour Co-op	Ian McCargo	2,395	30.6	
Yorkshire	Bob Buxton	1,530	19.6	
Green Party - Save Our Green Space	Mark Rollinson	1,326	16.9	
Liberal Democrats	Cynthia Dowling	401	5.1	
Liberal Democrats	Michael Edwards	396	5.1	
Liberal Democrats	Katherine Bavage	350	4.5	
Majority		1,021		
Turnout		7,825	42.3	+2.1
Conservative hold		Swing		
Conservative hold		Swing		
Conservative hold		Swing		

=== Harewood ===
The two Conservatives re-standing for election were successful, with fellow Conservative Councillor Rachael Procter, who was deselected, replaced by Samuel Firth.

Harewood (3)
Party	Candidate	Votes	%	±%
Conservative	Matthew Robinson*	4,461	71.9	
Conservative	Samuel Firth	4,039	65.1	
Conservative	Ryan Stephenson*	4,003	64.5	
Labour	Adrian Duthie	1,126	18.1	
Green	David Corry	918	14.8	
Labour	Kathryn Stainburn	912	14.7	
Liberal Democrats	Dan Cook	852	13.7	
Labour	Zahid Noor	757	12.2	
Majority		3,335		
Turnout		6,207	41.6	+2.9
Conservative hold		Swing		
Conservative hold		Swing		
Conservative hold		Swing		

=== Headingley & Hyde Park ===
The three incumbent Labour councillors for Headingley ward stood and won the three council seats to represent the new and enlarged ward of Headingley & Hyde Park.

Headingley & Hyde Park (3)
Party	Candidate	Votes	%	±%
Labour	Jonathan Pryor*	3,126	67.8	
Labour	Al Garthwaite*	2,999	65.0	
Labour	Neil Walshaw*	2,694	58.4	
Green	Tim Goodall	1,270	27.5	
Green	Liberty Anstead	643	13.9	
Green	Ann Forsaith	576	12.5	
Liberal Democrats	Penny Goodman	488	10.6	
Women's Equality	Louise Jennings	394	8.5	
Liberal Democrats	Peter Andrews	351	7.6	
Liberal Democrats	Murray Hawthorne	276	6.0	
Conservative	Michael Gledhill	205	4.4	
Conservative	Justin Earley	201	4.4	
Conservative	Kyle Green	191	4.1	
TUSC	James Ellis	78	1.7	
Majority		1,856		
Turnout		4,612	23.0	N/A
Labour win (new seat)				
Labour win (new seat)				
Labour win (new seat)				

=== Horsforth ===
Horsforth (3)
Party	Candidate	Votes	%	±%
Conservative	Dawn Collins*	3,195	41.7	
Conservative	Jonathon Taylor	2,770	36.2	
Conservative	Jackie Shemilt	2,660	34.7	
Labour	John Garvani	2,453	32.0	
Labour	Briony Sloan	2,380	31.1	
Labour	Nathalie Bethesda	2,208	28.8	
Liberal Democrats	Simon Dowling	1,976	25.8	
Liberal Democrats	Becky Heaviside	1,903	24.8	
Liberal Democrats	Christopher Read	1,288	16.8	
Green Party - Save Our Green Space	Caroline Tomes	1,132	14.8	
Majority		742		
Turnout		7,659	43.8	+1.6
Conservative hold		Swing		
Conservative gain from Liberal Democrats		Swing		
Conservative gain from Liberal Democrats		Swing		

=== Hunslet & Riverside ===
The two incumbent Labour councillors of the previous City & Hunslet ward were re-elected for the new ward alongside Paul Wray. Wray replaced the deselected City & Hunslet Councillor Patrick Davey as the third Labour candidate.

Hunslet & Riverside (3)
Party	Candidate	Votes	%	±%
Labour	Elizabeth Nash*	2,399	52.5	
Labour	Mohammed Iqbal*	2,391	52.3	
Labour	Paul Wray	2,132	46.7	
Green	Ed Carlisle	1,740	38.1	
Green	Eunice Goncalves	1,024	22.4	
Green	Alaric Hall	931	20.4	
Conservative	Richard Salt	409	9.0	
Conservative	Scott Smith	384	8.4	
Conservative	Michael Wheeler	342	7.5	
Independent	Kenny Saunders	340	7.4	
Liberal Democrats	James Spencer	176	3.9	
Majority		659		
Turnout		4,569	27.4	N/A
Labour win (new seat)				
Labour win (new seat)				
Labour win (new seat)				

=== Killingbeck & Seacroft ===
Three new Labour councillors were elected, defeating the incumbent independent Councillor Catherine Dobson. Elected originally as a Labour councillor, Dobson resigned from the Labour Group in October 2017. The two remaining Labour incumbents, Graham Hyde and Brian Selby, retired at the election and did not restand.

Killingbeck & Seacroft (3)
Party	Candidate	Votes	%	±%
Labour	Paul Drinkwater	2,718	62.4	
Labour	David Jenkins	2,602	59.8	
Labour	Katie Dye	2,585	59.4	
East Leeds Independents	Catherine Dobson*	1,005	23.1	
Conservative	Marilyn Coen	619	14.2	
Yorkshire	John Otley	538	12.4	
Conservative	Anne Palmer	478	11.0	
Conservative	Fiona Robertson	445	10.2	
Liberal Democrats	Kate Langwick	389	8.9	
Majority		1,713		
Turnout		4,354	25.7	−2.1
Labour hold		Swing		
Labour hold		Swing		
Labour hold		Swing		

=== Kippax & Methley ===
The three incumbent Labour councillors were re-elected, including the current Joint Deputy Leader of the Council, James Lewis, and former Leader of the Council, Keith Wakefield.

Kippax & Methley (3)
Party	Candidate	Votes	%	±%
Labour	Mary Harland*	3,135	57.0	
Labour	James Lewis*	3,027	55.0	
Labour	Keith Wakefield*	2,856	51.9	
Conservative	Chris Calvert	1,355	24.6	
Conservative	Nicholas Fawcett	1,348	24.5	
Conservative	Tess Wheldon	1,049	19.1	
Green	Dylan Brown	758	13.8	
UKIP	Tina Smith	474	8.6	
UKIP	Paul Spivey	439	8.0	
Liberal Democrats	Mitchell Galdas	382	6.9	
UKIP	Sheila Shippey	323	5.9	
Majority		1,780		
Turnout		5,503	32.87	−1.63
Labour hold		Swing		
Labour hold		Swing		
Labour hold		Swing		

=== Kirkstall ===
New Labour candidate Hannah Bithell topped the poll, elected alongside incumbent Councillors Fiona Venner and John Illingworth. Bithell replaced the retiring Joint Deputy Leader of the Council, Lucinda Yeadon, as the third Labour candidate.

Kirkstall (3)
Party	Candidate	Votes	%	±%
Labour	Hannah Bithell	3,977	74.5	
Labour	Fiona Venner*	3,850	72.1	
Labour	John Illingworth*	3,634	68.0	
Green	Ben Goldthorp	978	18.3	
Conservative	Liam Kenrick-Bailey	645	12.1	
Conservative	Amaad Amin	471	8.8	
Conservative	Eleni Nicolaou	454	8.5	
Liberal Democrats	Maria Frank	445	8.3	
Majority		2,999		
Turnout		5,341	32.2	−2.3
Labour hold		Swing		
Labour hold		Swing		
Labour hold		Swing		

=== Little London & Woodhouse ===
Labour Councillor for Hyde Park & Woodhouse Christine Towler retired whilst her two ward colleagues, Javaid Akhtar and Gerry Harper, stood successfully for the new ward of Little London & Woodhouse, following boundary changes. They were joined by new Labour candidate Kayleigh Brooks.

Little London & Woodhouse (3)
Party	Candidate	Votes	%	±%
Labour	Kayleigh Brooks	2,425	81.1	
Labour	Javaid Akhtar*	2,415	80.8	
Labour	Gerry Harper*	2,126	71.1	
Green	Christopher Foren	530	17.7	
Liberal Democrats	Lorna Campbell	268	9.0	
Conservative	Brandon Ashford	249	8.3	
Conservative	Stewart Harper	166	5.6	
Majority		1,895		
Turnout		2,990	15.6	N/A
Labour win (new seat)				
Labour win (new seat)				
Labour win (new seat)				

=== Middleton Park ===
Middleton Park (3)
Party	Candidate	Votes	%	±%
Labour	Kim Groves*	3,373	73.7	
Labour	Judith Blake*	2,747	60.0	
Labour	Paul Truswell*	2,366	51.7	
SDP	Wayne Dixon	1,232	26.9	
Conservative	David Herdson	621	13.6	
Conservative	Rita Jessop	613	13.4	
Conservative	Gareth Lamb	451	9.9	
Liberal Democrats	Kathryn Gagen	293	6.4	
Majority		2,141		
Turnout		4,577	23.6	+1.3
Labour hold		Swing		
Labour hold		Swing		
Labour hold		Swing		

=== Moortown ===
The two Labour councillors re-standing for election were successful. Mohammed Shahzad replaced retiring Councillor Alex Sobel (also MP for Leeds North West) as the third Labour candidate.

Moortown (3)
Party	Candidate	Votes	%	±%
Labour	Rebecca Charlwood*	4,248	56.8	
Labour	Sharon Hamilton*	3,730	49.8	
Labour	Mohammed Shahzad	3,527	47.1	
Conservative	Ross Cunliffe	1,719	23.0	
Conservative	Rob Speed	1,643	22.0	
Conservative	Liam Pearce	1,527	20.4	
Liberal Democrats	Ian Dowling	1,287	17.2	
Green	Gavin Andrews	1,188	15.9	
Liberal Democrats	David Dresser	996	13.3	
Liberal Democrats	Chris Howley	874	11.7	
UKIP	Ian Greenberg	155	2.1	
UKIP	Jeff Miles	134	1.8	
Majority		2,529		
Turnout		7,485	43.3	+4.6
Labour hold		Swing		
Labour hold		Swing		
Labour hold		Swing		

=== Morley North ===
The Morley Borough Independents won all three available council seats again, with new candidate Andy Hutchinson replacing Robert Finnigan. Finnigan, also the Leader of the MBI Group on the council, chose to stand for Morley South ward instead.

Morley North (3)
Party	Candidate	Votes	%	±%
Morley Borough Independent	Bob Gettings*	3,480	58.0	
Morley Borough Independent	Andy Hutchison	2,945	49.0	
Morley Borough Independent	Thomas Leadley*	2,767	46.1	
Labour Co-op	Pete Compton	1,701	28.3	
Labour Co-op	Steve Clapcote	1,345	22.4	
Labour Co-op	Jonathan Leng	1,269	21.1	
Conservative	Jason Aldiss	1,149	19.1	
Conservative	Christopher Dilworth	1,146	19.1	
Conservative	Louisa Singh	695	11.6	
Liberal Democrats	Philip Mellor	284	4.7	
Majority		2,529		
Turnout		6,005	33.5	+0.7
Morley Borough Independent hold		Swing		
Morley Borough Independent hold		Swing		
Morley Borough Independent hold		Swing		

=== Morley South ===
Morley South (3)
Party	Candidate	Votes	%	±%
Morley Borough Independent	Judith Elliott*	2,500	47.3	
Labour Co-op	Neil Dawson*	2,102	39.8	
Morley Borough Independent	Wyn Kidger	2,082	39.4	
Morley Borough Independent	Robert Finnigan	2,028	38.4	
Labour Co-op	Charlotte Hill	1,799	34.1	
Labour Co-op	Luke Mitchell	1,712	32.4	
Conservative	Rachel Oldham	848	16.1	
Conservative	Jermaine Sanwoolu	698	13.2	
Green	Chris Bell	583	11.0	
Conservative	Jas Singh	547	10.4	
Liberal Democrats	Raymond Smith	148	2.8	
Majority		398		
Turnout		5,283	30.7	−0.1
Morley Borough Independent hold		Swing		
Labour Co-op hold		Swing		
Morley Borough Independent hold		Swing		

=== Otley & Yeadon ===
Otley & Yeadon (3)
Party	Candidate	Votes	%	±%
Liberal Democrats	Colin Campbell*	3,768	49.1	
Liberal Democrats	Sandy Lay*	3,757	49.0	
Liberal Democrats	Ryk Downes*	3,663	47.7	
Labour	Sian Gregory	2,340	30.5	
Labour	Elliot Nathan	2,200	28.7	
Labour	James Ranson	1,703	22.2	
Green	Mick Bradley	1,245	16.2	
Conservative	Kenneth Creek	1,094	14.3	
Conservative	Diane Fox	978	12.7	
Conservative	Philip Rees	974	12.7	
For Britain	Tom Hollings	241	3.1	
Majority		1,428		
Turnout		7,673	43.4	−1.7
Liberal Democrats hold		Swing		
Liberal Democrats hold		Swing		
Liberal Democrats hold		Swing		

=== Pudsey ===
The Conservatives gained two seats whilst Labour Councillor Richard Lewis was re-elected by 75 votes over the third Conservative candidate. Labour Councillor Mick Coulson was the only incumbent to lose their bid for re-election as his fellow Labour colleague Josephine Jarosz retired.

Pudsey (3)
Party	Candidate	Votes	%	±%
Conservative	Simon Seary	3,324	46.2	
Conservative	Mark Harrison	3,099	43.1	
Labour	Richard Lewis*	2,976	41.4	
Conservative	Mark Neve	2,901	40.3	
Labour	Mick Coulson*	2,731	38.0	
Labour	Lou Cunningham	2,698	37.5	
Yorkshire	Conor O'Neill	570	7.9	
Green	Helen Hart	545	7.6	
Liberal Democrats	Christine Glover	460	6.4	
Liberal Democrats	Jude Arbuckle	247	3.4	
Liberal Democrats	Martin Hughes	190	2.6	
Majority		423		
Turnout		7,191	38.2	+1.3
Conservative gain from Labour		Swing		
Conservative gain from Labour		Swing		
Labour hold		Swing		

=== Rothwell ===
Rothwell (3)
Party	Candidate	Votes	%	±%
Liberal Democrats	Stewart Golton*	3,167	52.3	
Liberal Democrats	Carmel Harrison	2,338	38.6	
Labour	Karen Bruce*	2,326	38.4	
Liberal Democrats	Patricia Yates	2,157	35.6	
Labour	David Nagle*	1,857	30.7	
Labour	Sharon Burke	1,645	27.2	
Conservative	Joe Boycott	1,254	20.7	
Conservative	Melieha Long	855	14.1	
Conservative	Shazar Ahad	686	11.3	
Green	Ali Aliremzioglu	358	5.9	
Majority		841		
Turnout		6,052	37.7	+1.3
Liberal Democrats hold		Swing		
Liberal Democrats gain from Labour		Swing		
Labour hold		Swing		

=== Roundhay ===
Roundhay (3)
Party	Candidate	Votes	%	±%
Labour	Eleanor Tunnicliffe*	4,203	53.7	
Labour	Angela Wenham	4,165	53.2	
Labour	Jacob Goddard	4,131	52.7	
Conservative	Elayna Cohen	1,661	21.2	
Conservative	Farzana Arif	1,612	20.6	
Independent	Tony Quinn	1,348	17.2	
Conservative	Aftab Khan	1,318	16.8	
Green	Paul Ellis	1,007	12.9	
Liberal Democrats	Jon Hannah	888	11.3	
Liberal Democrats	Rory Mason	621	7.9	
Liberal Democrats	Najeeb Iqbal	598	7.6	
Alliance for Green Socialism	Malcolm Christie	390	5.0	
Majority		2,542		
Turnout		7,834	45.1	+3.3
Labour hold		Swing		
Labour hold		Swing		
Labour hold		Swing		

=== Temple Newsam ===
All three Labour incumbent councillors won re-election. After the election, Debra Coupar replaced former Kirkstall ward councillor, Lucinda Yeadon, as Joint Deputy Leader of the Council.

Temple Newsam (3)
Party	Candidate	Votes	%	±%
Labour	Debra Coupar*	2,641	49.1	
Labour	Helen Hayden*	2,603	48.4	
Labour	Mick Lyons*	2,482	46.1	
Conservative	Elizabeth Hayes	2,113	39.3	
Conservative	Neale Deacon	2,062	38.3	
Conservative	Robert Hayes	1,739	32.3	
Green	Fiona Love	610	11.3	
Liberal Democrats	Keith Norman	478	8.9	
Majority		528		
Turnout		5,380	36.2	+0.2
Labour hold		Swing		
Labour hold		Swing		
Labour hold		Swing		

=== Weetwood ===
Weetwood (3)
Party	Candidate	Votes	%	±%
Liberal Democrats	Jonathan Bentley*	2,934	45.3	
Labour	Christine Knight	2,717	42.0	
Labour	James Gibson	2,699	41.7	
Liberal Democrats	Brian Jennings	2,488	38.4	
Labour	John McMahon	2,418	37.4	
Liberal Democrats	Lynda Sebire	2,241	34.6	
Green	Martin Hemingway	955	14.8	
Conservative	Angelo Basu	695	10.7	
Conservative	David Jessop	694	10.7	
Conservative	Howard Kiernan	674	10.4	
Majority		217		
Turnout		6,471	40.8	−0.5
Liberal Democrats hold		Swing		
Labour gain from Liberal Democrats		Swing		
Labour gain from Liberal Democrats		Swing		

=== Wetherby ===
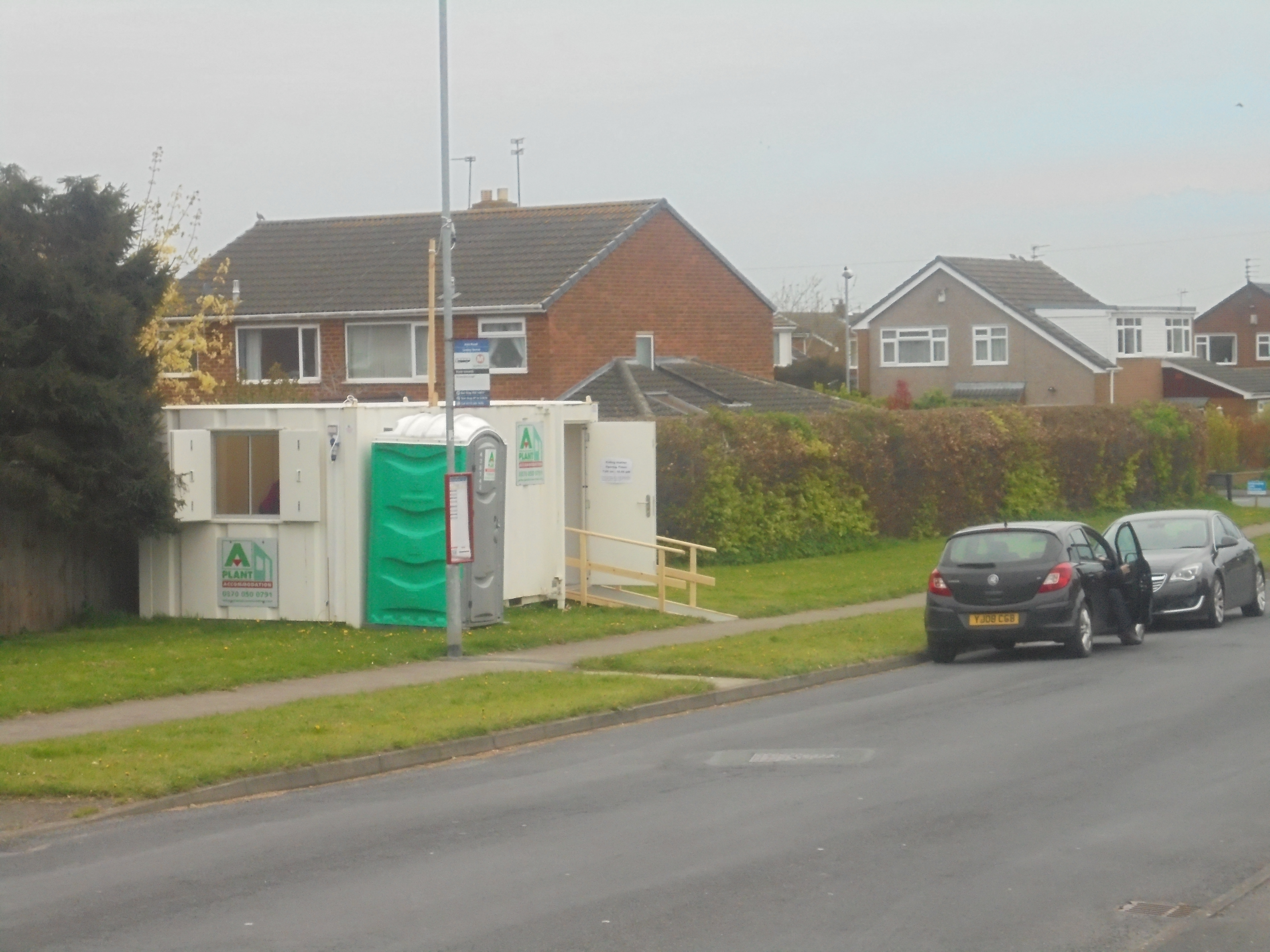
A polling station on Aire Road, Wetherby, on the day of the election.

New Conservative candidate and Mayor of Wetherby Norma Harrington topped the poll, elected with the two Conservative incumbents who were re-standing for election. Harrington was chosen as the third Conservative candidate instead of current Councillor John Procter (also MEP for Yorkshire and the Humber).

Wetherby (3)
Party	Candidate	Votes	%	±%
Conservative	Norma Harrington	4,160	65.5	
Conservative	Alan Lamb*	4,126	64.9	
Conservative	Gerald Wilkinson*	4,067	64.0	
Labour	John Lynch	1,308	20.6	
Liberal Democrats	David Hopps	1,189	18.7	
Labour	Jan Egan	1,069	16.8	
Labour	Paul Ratcliffe	875	13.8	
Green	Martin Pearce	704	11.1	
Majority		2,852		
Turnout		6,354	39.9	
Conservative hold		Swing		
Conservative hold		Swing		
Conservative hold		Swing		
