= Wetherby (ward) =

Electoral ward in Leeds, England

- Wetherby highlighted within Leeds
- Population: 16,730 (2023 electorate)
- Metropolitan borough: City of Leeds
- Metropolitan county: West Yorkshire
- Region: Yorkshire and the Humber
- Country: England
- Sovereign state: United Kingdom
- UK Parliament: Wetherby and Easingwold
- Councillors: Norma Harrington (Conservative); Alan Lamb (Conservative); Penny Stables (Green)

Wetherby is an electoral ward of Leeds City Council in north east Leeds, West Yorkshire, covering the town of Wetherby and villages including Boston Spa, Bramham and Thorp Arch.

== Boundaries ==
The Wetherby ward includes the following civil parishes:

- Boston Spa
- Bramham cum Oglethorpe (Bramham Parish Council)
- Clifford
- Thorp Arch
- Walton
- Wetherby (Wetherby Town Council)

== Councillors ==
Election	Councillor	Councillor	Councillor
1973	David Hudson (Con)	Nick Brown (Con)	J. Rolston (Con)
1975	David Hudson (Con)	Nick Brown (Con)	W. Hill (Con)
1976	David Hudson (Con)	Nick Brown (Con) (Note: Brown resigned his seat before the next election in 1978. He would later become a Harrogate Borough Councillor in 2008.)	W. Hill (Con)
1978	David Hudson (Con)	J. Grange (Con)	W. Hill (Con)
1979	David Hudson (Con)	J. Grange (Con)	Heather Gardiner (Con)
1980	David Hudson (Con)	J. Gray (Con)	Heather Gardiner (Con)
1982	David Hudson (Con)	J. Gray (Con)	Heather Gardiner (Con)
1983	David Hudson (Con)	J. Gray (Con)	Heather Gardiner (Con)
1984	David Hudson (Con)	J. Gray (Con)	Heather Gardiner (Con)
1986	David Hudson (Con)	J. Gray (Con)	Heather Gardiner (Con)
1987	David Hudson (Con)	John Evans (Con)	Heather Gardiner (Con)
1988	David Hudson (Con)	John Evans (Con)	Heather Gardiner (Con)
1990	David Hudson (Con)	John Evans (Con)	Heather Gardiner (Con)
1991	David Hudson (Con)	John Evans (Con)	Heather Gardiner (Con)
1992	David Hudson (Con)	John Evans (Con)	Heather Gardiner (Con)
1992 by-election	David Hudson (Con)	John Procter (Con)	Heather Gardiner (Con)
1994	David Hudson (Con)	John Procter (Con)	Heather Gardiner (Con)
1995	David Hudson (Con)	John Procter (Con)	Heather Gardiner (Con)
1996	David Hudson (Con)	John Procter (Con)	David Clark (Con)
1998	David Hudson (Con)	John Procter (Con)	David Clark (Con)
1999	David Hudson (Con)	John Procter (Con)	Gerald Wilkinson (Con)
2000	David Hudson (Con)	John Procter (Con)	Gerald Wilkinson (Con)
2002	David Hudson (Con)	John Procter (Con)	Gerald Wilkinson (Con)
2003	Andrew Millard (Con)	John Procter (Con)	Gerald Wilkinson (Con)
2004	Andrew Millard (Con)	John Procter (Con)	Gerald Wilkinson (Con)
2006	Andrew Millard (Con)	John Procter (Con)	Gerald Wilkinson (Con)
2007	Alan Lamb (Con)	John Procter (Con)	Gerald Wilkinson (Con)
2008	Alan Lamb (Con)	John Procter (Con)	Gerald Wilkinson (Con)
2010	Alan Lamb (Con)	John Procter (Con)	Gerald Wilkinson (Con)
2011	Alan Lamb (Con)	John Procter (Con)	Gerald Wilkinson (Con)
2012	Alan Lamb (Con)	John Procter (Con)	Gerald Wilkinson (Con)
2014	Alan Lamb (Con)	John Procter (Con)	Gerald Wilkinson (Con)
2015	Alan Lamb (Con)	John Procter (Con)	Gerald Wilkinson (Con)
2016	Alan Lamb (Con)	John Procter (Con) (Note: Procter became a Member of the European Parliament for Yorkshire and the Humber in November 2016. In 2017, Procter was not re-selected as a Conservative candidate to stand in his council ward at the 2018 election.)	Gerald Wilkinson (Con)
2018	Alan Lamb (Con)	Norma Harrington (Con)	Gerald Wilkinson (Con)
2019	Alan Lamb (Con)	Norma Harrington (Con)	Gerald Wilkinson (Con)
2019 by-election	Alan Lamb (Con)	Norma Harrington (Con)	Linda Richards (Con) (Note: The by-election was called to find a successor to Gerald Wilkinson following his death in October 2019.)
2021	Alan Lamb (Con)	Norma Harrington (Con)	Linda Richards (Con)
2022	Alan Lamb (Con)	Norma Harrington (Con)	Linda Richards (Con)
2023	Alan Lamb (Con)	Norma Harrington (Con)	Penny Stables (GPEW)
2024	Alan Lamb (Con)	Norma Harrington (Con)	Penny Stables (GPEW)
2026	Alan Lamb* (Con)	Norma Harrington* (Con)	Penny Stables* (GPEW)

indicates seat up for re-election. indicates seat up for election following resignation or death of sitting councillor. * indicates incumbent councillor.

== Elections since 2010 ==
=== May 2026 ===
2026
Party	Candidate	Votes	%	±%
Conservative	Norma Harrington*	3,684	43.4	−5.8
Green	Fran Murphy	2,586	30.5	−7.0
Reform	Stuart Burdekin	1,464	17.3	New
Labour Co-op	Alex Riddell	549	6.5	−3.2
Liberal Democrats	Jonathan Levy	182	2.1	−0.9
Majority		1,098	12.9	+1.2
Turnout		8,465	51.5	+5.6
Conservative hold		Swing	+0.6	

=== May 2024 ===
2024
Party	Candidate	Votes	%	±%
Conservative	Alan Lamb*	3,727	49.2	+10.9
Green	Anna Jacobs	2,845	37.5	−15.4
Labour	David Bowgett	736	9.7	+3.2
Liberal Democrats	Lesley McIntee	229	3.0	+0.9
SDP	Ian Howell	43	0.6	New
Majority		882	11.7	−2.8
Turnout		7,603	45.9	−0.2
Conservative hold		Swing	+13.2	

=== May 2023 ===
2023
Party	Candidate	Votes	%	±%
Green	Penny Stables	4,079	52.9	+18.5
Conservative	Linda Richards*	2,958	38.3	−8.7
Labour Co-op	Lucy Nuttgens	498	6.5	−5.2
Liberal Democrats	James Prince	161	2.1	−4.4
Majority		1,121	14.5	+1.8
Turnout		7,714	46.1	+1.2
Green gain from Conservative		Swing		

=== May 2022 ===
2022
Party	Candidate	Votes	%	±%
Conservative	Norma Harrington*	3,514	47.0	−11.0
Green	Penny Stables	2,568	34.4	+12.1
Labour Co-op	Luke Dixon-Murrow	878	11.7	−0.9
Liberal Democrats	Lesley McIntee	484	6.5	−0.2
Majority		946	12.7	−23.0
Turnout		7,473	44.9	−2.9
Conservative hold		Swing		

=== May 2021 ===
2021
Party	Candidate	Votes	%	±%
Conservative	Alan Lamb*	4,563	58.0	+1.1
Green	Penny Stables	1,753	22.3	+12.8
Labour Co-op	Steve Clapcote	991	12.6	+2.9
Liberal Democrats	James Clark	527	6.7	−17.1
Majority		2,810	35.7	+3.6
Turnout		7,874	47.8	+9.2
Conservative hold		Swing		

=== December 2019 by-election ===
12 December 2019 replacing Gerald Wilkinson (deceased)
Party	Candidate	Votes	%	±%
Conservative	Linda Richards	7,181	57.7	+0.8
Liberal Democrats	David Hopps	2,373	19.1	−4.7
Labour	Michael Bailey	1,906	15.3	+5.6
Green	Judith Dahlgreen	916	7.4	−2.1
Majority		4,808	38.6	+6.5
Turnout		12,449	75.3	+36.7
Conservative hold		Swing		

=== May 2019 ===
2019
Party	Candidate	Votes	%	±%
Conservative	Gerald Wilkinson*	3,466	56.9	+0.4
Liberal Democrats	David Hopps	1,452	23.8	+7.6
Labour	Paul Ratcliffe	593	9.7	−8.1
Green	Ruth Corry	580	9.5	−0.1
Majority		2,014	32.1	−6.6
Turnout		6,198	38.6	TBC
Conservative hold		Swing	-3.6	

=== May 2018 ===
2018
Party	Candidate	Votes	%	±%
Conservative	Norma Harrington	4,160	56.5	−1.8
Conservative	Alan Lamb*	4,126		
Conservative	Gerald Wilkinson*	4,067		
Labour	John Lynch	1,308	17.8	−1.8
Liberal Democrats	David Hopps	1,189	16.2	+9.9
Labour	Jan Egan	1,069		
Labour	Paul Ratcliffe	875		
Green	Martin Pearce	704	9.6	+6.1
Majority		2,852	TBC	TBC
Turnout		TBC	TBC	TBC
Conservative hold		Swing		
Conservative hold		Swing		
Conservative hold		Swing		

=== May 2016 ===
2016
Party	Candidate	Votes	%	±%
Conservative	Gerald Wilkinson*	3,387	58.3	−0.1
Labour	Adam Ferhani	1,141	19.6	−1.6
UKIP	Tina Janette Smith	712	12.3	+3.2
Liberal Democrats	Christine Mavis Golton	366	6.3	+0.3
Green	Vasco Santos	203	3.5	−1.8
Majority		2,246	38.7	+1.6
Turnout		5,809	37.5	
Conservative hold		Swing		

=== May 2015 ===
2015
Party	Candidate	Votes	%	±%
Conservative	Alan Lamb*	6,924	58.4	−1.5
Labour	John Lynch	2,517	21.2	−4.6
UKIP	Bronwen Cole	1,085	9.1	+2.5
Liberal Democrats	Sara Howell	709	6.0	−1.7
Green	Sam Murrey	631	5.3	+5.3
Majority		4,407	37.1	+2.9
Turnout		11,866	75.3	
Conservative hold		Swing	+1.6	

=== May 2014 ===
2014
Party	Candidate	Votes	%	±%
Conservative	John Procter*	2,995	50.2	−5.7
UKIP	Paul Spivey	1,096	18.4	+3.4
Labour	Paul Drinkwater	1,023	17.2	−5.8
Green	Sam Murray	508	8.5	
Liberal Democrats	Sara Howell	340	5.7	−0.4
Majority		1,899	31.8	
Turnout			38.38	
Conservative hold		Swing		

=== May 2012 ===
2012
Party	Candidate	Votes	%	±%
Conservative	Gerry Wilkinson*	3,123	55.9	−4.0
Labour	Scott Nicholson	1,286	23.0	−2.7
UKIP	David Macey	838	15.0	+8.4
Liberal Democrats	Benjamin Chapman	338	6.1	−1.7
Majority		1,837	32.9	−1.3
Turnout		5,585		
Conservative hold		Swing	-0.6	

=== May 2011 ===
2011
Party	Candidate	Votes	%	±%
Conservative	Alan Lamb*	4,524	59.9	+7.0
Labour	James Barber	1,945	25.8	+5.0
Liberal Democrats	Jonathan Bentley	583	7.7	−10.8
UKIP	David Macey	497	6.6	+1.4
Majority		2,579	34.2	+2.1
Turnout		7,549	49	
Conservative hold		Swing	+1.0	

=== May 2010 ===
2010
Party	Candidate	Votes	%	±%
Conservative	John Procter*	6,115	52.9	−11.7
Labour	Ashley Walsh	2,403	20.8	+4.4
Liberal Democrats	Jonathan Bentley	2,142	18.5	+8.8
UKIP	David Macey	595	5.1	+0.7
BNP	Sam Clayton	302	2.6	−2.2
Majority		3,712	32.1	−16.1
Turnout		11,557	75.0	+32.8
Conservative hold		Swing	-8.0	
