= 1992 Leeds City Council election =

1992 UK local government election

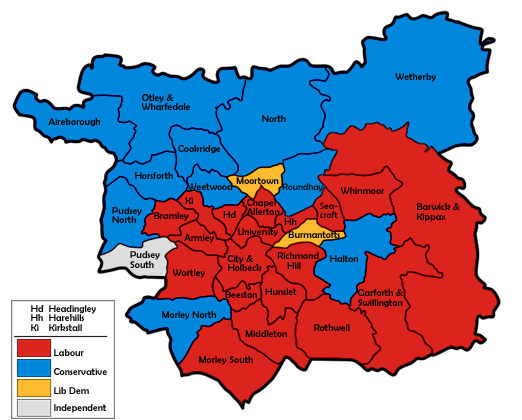
Map of the results for the 1992 Leeds council election.

The 1992 Leeds City Council elections were held on Thursday, 7 May 1992, with one third of the council's seats up for election.

Held one month after the 1992 general election where Conservatives won a surprise fourth term, the Conservatives in Leeds shared in that success, surpassing Labour's vote for the first time in a decade, and winning their greatest share since 1978. Despite these feats, their vote remained constant with recent elections - in stark contrast to the opposition parties, whose votes had seen dramatic falls, with the Liberal Democrat vote their lowest since 1978, and Labour's their lowest recorded since the council's creation in 1973.

The minor parties also saw disappointment, with the Liberal vote more than halved the previous year and comfortably their worst, whilst the Greens - in spite of a record number of candidates, up considerably from the year before - seen a decrease in their vote. All of which resulted in a record low in turnout, suggesting the Tory revival was driven more by their national result hurting opposition moral than any resurgence in their support.

The Conservatives were able to win their greatest number of wards since 1983, gaining a seat each from Labour and the Lib Dems in their respective marginals of Morley North and Horsforth. The Tory gain in Horsforth, as well as Labour's rise in Armley, left the Lib Dem victories confined to just two wards for the first time since 1979 (Burmantofts and Moortown), and their councillor total the lowest since 1980. The sole Independent standing, Peter Kersting, won his fourth term in Pudsey South with ease (with the first being won as Conservative).

== Election result ==
Leeds local election result 1992
Party	Seats	Gains	Losses	Net gain/loss	Seats %	Votes %	Votes	+/−
Labour	19	0	1	-1	57.6	38.4	65,813	-7.7
Conservative	11	2	0	+2	33.3	40.7	69,676	+10.5
Liberal Democrats	2	0	1	-1	6.1	16.1	27,507	-4.1
Independent	1	0	0	0	3.0	1.7	2,953	+1.6
Green	0	0	0	0	0.0	2.3	3,863	+0.4
Liberal	0	0	0	0	0.0	0.8	1,332	-0.7

This result had the following consequences for the total number of seats on the council after the elections:

Party	Previous council	New council
Labour	68	67
Conservative	21	23
Liberal Democrat	9	8
Independent	1	1
Total	99	99
Working majority	37	35

== Ward results ==
Aireborough
Party	Candidate	Votes	%	±%
Conservative	R. Hughes-Rowlands	3,851	51.3	+14.1
Labour	Gerry Harper	2,358	31.4	−0.9
Liberal Democrats	D. Gowland	1,161	15.5	−12.7
Green	A. Peterken	144	1.9	−0.4
Majority		1,493	19.9	+15.0
Turnout		7,514		
Conservative hold		Swing	+7.5	

Armley
Party	Candidate	Votes	%	±%
Labour	James McKenna	2,094	52.1	−4.9
Conservative	J. Mortimer	1,038	25.8	+8.6
Liberal	A. Gonzalez	450	11.2	+0.7
Liberal Democrats	A. Davies	315	7.8	−2.0
Green	M. Stroud	120	3.0	−2.3
Majority		1,056	26.3	−13.5
Turnout		4,017		
Labour hold		Swing	-6.7	

Barwick & Kippax
Party	Candidate	Votes	%	±%
Labour	Keith Wakefield	3,414	50.1	−5.1
Conservative	C. Ward	2,852	41.8	+12.1
Liberal Democrats	D. Lindley	551	8.1	−2.5
Majority		562	8.2	−17.2
Turnout		6,817		
Labour hold		Swing	-8.6	

Beeston
Party	Candidate	Votes	%	±%
Labour	David Congreve	1,861	55.6	−6.8
Conservative	H. Woodhead	1,105	33.0	+9.5
Liberal Democrats	T. Barton	384	11.5	−2.7
Majority		756	22.6	−16.3
Turnout		3,350		
Labour hold		Swing	-8.1	

Bramley
Party	Candidate	Votes	%	±%
Labour	C. Cliff	2,477	60.4	−0.8
Conservative	T. Cooper	956	23.3	+10.4
Liberal	A. St. Quintin	291	7.1	−14.8
Liberal Democrats	C. Ward	252	6.1	+2.1
Green	M. Chatwood	125	3.0	+3.0
Majority		1,521	37.1	−2.2
Turnout		4,101		
Labour hold		Swing	-5.6	

Burmantofts
Party	Candidate	Votes	%	±%
Liberal Democrats	N. Mackie	1,971	50.4	+13.3
Labour	T. Ayres	1,642	42.0	−15.4
Conservative	R. Jones	300	7.7	+2.0
Majority		329	8.4	−11.9
Turnout		3,913		
Liberal Democrats hold		Swing	+14.3	

Chapel Allerton
Party	Candidate	Votes	%	±%
Labour	J. Frankland	2,647	58.3	−4.0
Conservative	I. Baxter	1,310	28.8	+8.2
Liberal Democrats	J. Pullan	367	8.1	−3.1
Green	R. Mills	219	4.8	−1.0
Majority		1,337	29.4	−12.2
Turnout		4,543		
Labour hold		Swing	-6.1	

City & Holbeck
Party	Candidate	Votes	%	±%
Labour	Elizabeth Nash	2,001	66.0	−3.4
Conservative	D. Boynton	542	17.9	+7.1
Liberal Democrats	R. Mayne	326	10.8	−4.2
Green	D. Blakemore	163	5.4	+0.5
Majority		1,459	48.1	−6.4
Turnout		3,032		
Labour hold		Swing	-5.2	

Cookridge
Party	Candidate	Votes	%	±%
Conservative	Keith Loudon	3,989	63.7	+10.7
Labour	G. Greenley	1,132	18.1	−8.4
Liberal Democrats	G. Murly	1,024	16.3	−4.3
Green	P. Marchant	122	1.9	+1.9
Majority		2,857	45.6	+19.1
Turnout		6,267		
Conservative hold		Swing	+9.5	

Garforth & Swillington
Party	Candidate	Votes	%	±%
Labour	Thomas Murray	3,286	48.3	−8.4
Conservative	J. Stott	2,893	42.5	+13.1
Liberal Democrats	R. Hutchinson	623	9.2	−4.7
Majority		393	5.8	−21.5
Turnout		6,802		
Labour hold		Swing	-10.7	

Halton
Party	Candidate	Votes	%	±%
Conservative	David Schofield	3,451	58.7	+11.9
Labour	R. Haggerty	1,769	30.1	−8.0
Liberal Democrats	David Hollingsworth	491	8.4	−6.6
Green	D. Harbud	165	2.8	+2.8
Majority		1,682	28.6	+19.9
Turnout		5,876		
Conservative hold		Swing	+9.9	

Harehills
Party	Candidate	Votes	%	±%
Labour	L. Cohen	2,115	64.2	−3.1
Conservative	A. Wilson	652	19.8	+7.1
Liberal Democrats	R. Senior	342	10.4	+0.0
Green	Andrew Tear	186	5.6	−0.1
Majority		1,463	44.4	−10.2
Turnout		3,295		
Labour hold		Swing	-5.1	

Headingley
Party	Candidate	Votes	%	±%
Labour	S. Perrigo	2,611	47.8	−2.4
Conservative	G. King	1,463	26.8	+8.5
Liberal Democrats	D. Goodman	964	17.6	−14.0
Green	P. Alexander	428	7.8	+7.8
Majority		1,148	21.0	+2.5
Turnout		5,466		
Labour hold		Swing	-5.4	

Horsforth
Party	Candidate	Votes	%	±%
Conservative	M. Addison	3,843	50.7	+10.8
Liberal Democrats	Christopher Townsley	2,802	37.0	−5.1
Labour	C. Hooson	723	9.5	−8.6
Green	G. Williamson	211	2.8	+2.8
Majority		1,041	13.7	+11.5
Turnout		7,579		
Conservative gain from Liberal Democrats		Swing	+7.9	

Hunslet
Party	Candidate	Votes	%	±%
Labour	Geoffrey Driver	1,970	76.1	−8.3
Conservative	A. Larvin	454	17.5	+2.0
Liberal Democrats	Stephen Sadler	165	6.4	+6.4
Majority		1,516	58.6	−10.3
Turnout		2,589		
Labour hold		Swing	-5.1	

Kirkstall
Party	Candidate	Votes	%	±%
Labour	Elizabeth Minkin	2,528	58.4	−1.3
Conservative	S. McBarron	1,103	25.5	+7.5
Green	A. Mander	369	8.5	−1.8
Liberal	N. Nowosielski	327	7.6	−4.4
Majority		1,425	32.9	−8.9
Turnout		4,327		
Labour hold		Swing	-4.4	

Middleton
Party	Candidate	Votes	%	±%
Labour	F. Dignan	1,887	66.0	−6.1
Conservative	D. Jowett	687	24.0	+8.0
Liberal Democrats	G. Roberts	286	10.0	−1.9
Majority		1,200	42.0	−14.0
Turnout		2,860		
Labour hold		Swing	-7.0	

Moortown
Party	Candidate	Votes	%	±%
Liberal Democrats	Mark Harris	3,301	49.3	−0.9
Conservative	J. Dagwell	2,360	35.2	+7.0
Labour	M. Plenderleith	922	13.8	−7.7
Green	C. Wooding	113	1.7	+1.7
Majority		941	14.1	−7.8
Turnout		6,696		
Liberal Democrats hold		Swing	-3.9	

Morley North
Party	Candidate	Votes	%	±%
Conservative	A. Barraclough	3,218	52.5	+12.7
Labour	P. Jones	2,517	41.0	−7.1
Liberal Democrats	G. Smith	400	6.5	−5.6
Majority		701	11.4	+3.0
Turnout		6,135		
Conservative gain from Labour		Swing	+9.9	

Morley South
Party	Candidate	Votes	%	±%
Labour	Bryan North	2,631	49.3	−5.1
Conservative	J. Galek	1,887	35.3	+9.2
Liberal Democrats	Thomas Leadley	720	13.5	−6.0
Green	T. Sykes	103	1.9	+1.9
Majority		744	13.9	−14.3
Turnout		5,341		
Labour hold		Swing	-7.1	

North
Party	Candidate	Votes	%	±%
Conservative	Peter Harrand	3,403	57.4	+2.6
Liberal Democrats	W. Forshaw	1,631	27.5	+1.7
Labour	P. Moxon	899	15.2	−4.3
Majority		1,772	29.9	+0.9
Turnout		5,933		
Conservative hold		Swing	+0.4	

Otley & Wharfedale
Party	Candidate	Votes	%	±%
Conservative	C. Hindle	4,124	54.3	+19.2
Liberal Democrats	E. Diggle	2,103	27.7	−16.1
Labour	John Everleigh	1,365	18.0	−3.1
Majority		2,021	26.6	+12.5
Turnout		7,592		
Conservative hold		Swing	+17.6	

Pudsey North
Party	Candidate	Votes	%	±%
Conservative	Andrew Carter	4,154	61.3	+17.8
Labour	A. Procter	1,515	22.4	−9.9
Liberal Democrats	Christine Glover	970	14.3	−5.8
Green	R. Notley	139	2.1	−2.1
Majority		2,639	38.9	+27.6
Turnout		6,778		
Conservative hold		Swing	+13.8	

Pudsey South
Party	Candidate	Votes	%	±%
Independent	Peter Kersting	2,953	47.3	+47.3
Conservative	L. Fletcher	1,435	23.0	−4.9
Labour	Robert Finnigan	1,402	22.5	−24.2
Liberal Democrats	M. Booker	364	5.8	−19.5
Green	C. Dillon-Parkin	85	1.4	+1.4
Majority		1,518	24.3	+5.6
Turnout		6,239		
Independent hold		Swing	+26.1	

Richmond Hill
Party	Candidate	Votes	%	±%
Labour	Michael Lyons	2,295	71.4	−2.6
Conservative	J. Birch	510	15.9	+5.4
Liberal Democrats	Keith Norman	334	10.4	−5.0
Green	A. Beggs	74	2.3	+2.3
Majority		1,785	55.6	−3.0
Turnout		3,213		
Labour hold		Swing	-4.0	

Rothwell
Party	Candidate	Votes	%	±%
Labour	R. Lund	2,501	54.4	−1.1
Conservative	A. Heeson	1,273	27.7	+5.8
Liberal Democrats	A. Barber	820	17.8	−4.7
Majority		1,228	26.7	−6.3
Turnout		4,594		
Labour hold		Swing	-3.4	

Roundhay
Party	Candidate	Votes	%	±%
Conservative	Pat Crotty	3,726	57.9	+8.0
Labour	M. Davies	1,420	22.1	−5.4
Liberal Democrats	J. Sefton	1,059	16.4	−2.0
Green	P. Ellis	233	3.6	−0.5
Majority		2,306	35.8	+13.4
Turnout		6,438		
Conservative hold		Swing	+6.7	

Seacroft
Party	Candidate	Votes	%	±%
Labour	Graham Hyde	2,808	77.0	+0.9
Conservative	M. Collinson	607	16.6	+3.3
Liberal Democrats	Sadie Fisher	234	6.4	−4.2
Majority		2,201	60.3	−2.4
Turnout		3,649		
Labour hold		Swing	-1.2	

University
Party	Candidate	Votes	%	±%
Labour	A. Munro	2,019	61.2	−4.3
Conservative	Robert Winfield	581	17.6	+4.7
Liberal Democrats	A. Norman	358	10.9	−0.7
Green	J. Noble	340	10.3	+0.3
Majority		1,438	43.6	−9.0
Turnout		3,298		
Labour hold		Swing	-4.5	

Weetwood
Party	Candidate	Votes	%	±%
Conservative	M. Castle	2,744	46.1	+8.3
Labour	Brian Selby	1,636	27.5	−7.5
Liberal Democrats	Joan Ewens	1,393	23.4	−3.8
Green	Claire Nash	184	3.1	+3.1
Majority		1,108	18.6	+15.8
Turnout		5,957		
Conservative hold		Swing	+7.9	

Wetherby
Party	Candidate	Votes	%	±%
Conservative	H. Gardiner	5,967	74.4	+15.8
Labour	S. Molloy	1,161	14.5	−3.3
Liberal Democrats	T. Gittins	889	11.1	−8.8
Majority		4,806	59.9	+21.1
Turnout		8,017		
Conservative hold		Swing	+9.5	

Whinmoor
Party	Candidate	Votes	%	±%
Labour	Suzie Armitage	2,044	46.9	−9.0
Conservative	W. Hanbury	1,745	40.0	+9.7
Liberal Democrats	A. Beck	571	13.1	−0.7
Majority		299	6.9	−18.6
Turnout		4,360		
Labour hold		Swing	-9.3	

Wortley
Party	Candidate	Votes	%	±%
Labour	P. Towler	2,163	47.5	−9.0
Conservative	E. Ashton	1,453	31.9	+11.8
Green	David Blackburn	340	7.5	+2.5
Liberal Democrats	John McArthur	336	7.4	−1.4
Liberal	P. Williams	264	5.8	−3.8
Majority		710	15.6	−20.7
Turnout		4,556		
Labour hold		Swing	-10.4	

== By-elections between 1992 and 1994 ==
Wetherby by-election 23 July 1992 replacing John Evans
Party	Candidate	Votes	%	±%
Conservative	John Procter	3,379	71.3	−3.1
Liberal Democrats	Ann 'Paddy' Beck	772	16.3	+5.2
Labour	Stephen Molloy	586	12.4	−2.1
Majority		2,607	55.0	−4.9
Turnout		4,737		
Conservative hold		Swing	-4.1	
