= 2006 Leeds City Council election =

- 4 May 2006

33 of the 99 seats on Leeds City Council 50 seats needed for a majority
- Turnout: 35.9%
	First party	Second party	Third party
Leader	Keith Wakefield	Mark Harris	Andrew Carter
Party	Labour	Liberal Democrats	Conservative
Last election	40 seats, 29.1%	26 seats, %	24 seats, 26.9%
Seats won	16	8	7
Seats after	40	26	24
Seat change	Steady	Steady	Steady
Popular vote	62,957	42,554	53,693
Percentage	31.6%	21.4%	27.0%
Swing	▲2.5%	▼2.0%	▲0.1%
	Fourth party	Fifth party	Sixth party
Party	Morley Borough Independents	Green	BNP
Last election	6 seats, 2.6%	3 seats, 6.0%	0 seats, 7.7%
Seats won	1	1	1
Seats after	5	3	1
Seat change	▼1	Steady	▲1
Popular vote	4,749	9,118	22,642
Percentage	2.4%	4.6%	11.4%
Swing	▼0.2%	▼1.4%	▲3.7%
- Labour in red (16), Liberal Democrats in yellow (8), Conservatives in blue (7), BNP in dark blue, Greens in light green (1) and Morley Borough Independents in dark green (1).
Council control before election
Coalition
Liberal Democrats and Conservatives
Council control after election
Coalition
Liberal Democrats and Conservatives

The 2006 Leeds City Council election took place on Thursday, May 4, 2006 to elect members of Leeds City Council in England.

As per the election cycle, one third of the council's 99 seats were contested, plus an additional vacancy in Killingbeck & Seacroft ward. Those seats up for election were those of the third-placed candidate elected for every ward at the 2004 all-out election, who had been granted a two-year term to expire in 2006.

The only party to gain a seat was the British National Party, defeating the Morley Borough Independents in Morley South to elect their first and only councillor to date.

With the council remaining in no overall control, the election result saw the Liberal Democrat and Conservative coalition administration continue their control of the council.

== Election result ==
Leeds local election result 2006
Party	Seats	Gains	Losses	Net gain/loss	Seats %	Votes %	Votes	+/−
Labour	16	0	0	Steady	47.0	31.6	62,957	+2.5
Conservative	7	0	0	Steady	20.6	27.0	53,693	+0.1
Liberal Democrats	8	0	0	Steady	23.5	21.4	42,554	-2.0
BNP	1	1	0	▲1	2.9	11.4	22,642	+3.7
Green	1	0	0	Steady	2.9	4.6	9,118	-1.4
Morley Borough Independent	1	0	1	▼1	2.9	2.4	4,749	-0.2
Alliance for Green Socialism	0	0	0	Steady	0.0	1.0	2,067	-0.6
English Democrat	0	0	0	Steady	0.0	0.3	563	+0.3
Independent	0	0	0	Steady	0.0	0.1	254	-1.8
Respect	0	0	0	Steady	0.0	0.1	252	-0.1
CPA	0	0	0	Steady	0.0	0.1	140	+0.1
BPP	0	0	0	Steady	0.0	0.1	135	+0.1

This result had the following consequences for the total number of seats on the council after the elections:

Party	Previous council	New council
Labour	40	40
Liberal Democrat	26	26
Conservative	24	24
Morley Borough Independent	6	5
Green	3	3
BNP	0	1
Total	99	99
Working majority	-19	-19

== Councillors who did not stand for re-election ==
Councillor/s who did not stand for re-election (5)
Councillor	Ward	First elected	Party	Reason	Successor
Gareth Beevers	Morley South	2004	Morley Borough Independents	stood down	Christopher Beverley (British National Party)
Stuart Bruce	Middleton Park	1999	Labour	stood down	Debra Coupar (Labour)
Michael Davey	Killingbeck & Seacroft	2002	Labour	stood down	Vonnie Morgan (Labour)
Mitchell Galdas	Rothwell	2004	Liberal Democrats	stood down	Stewart Golton (Liberal Democrats)
Claire Nash	Farnley & Wortley	2000	Green	stood down	Luke Russell (Green)

Incumbent Liberal Democrat councillor, Stewart Golton (Weetwood), was elected to represent a new ward, succeeding Mitchell Galdas in Rothwell.

== Ward results ==
Adel & Wharfedale
Party	Candidate	Votes	%	±%
Conservative	Clive Fox*	4,128	53.5	−0.6
Liberal Democrats	Christina Shaw	2,085	27.0	+3.2
Labour	John Garvani	941	12.2	−3.6
English Democrat	Stephen Elliott	563	7.3	+7.3
Majority		2,042	26.5	−3.8
Turnout		7,718	48.0	−6.4
Conservative hold		Swing	-1.8	

Alwoodley
Party	Candidate	Votes	%	±%
Conservative	Peter Harrand*	3,693	50.4	+5.2
Liberal Democrats	Jonathan Brown	1,902	26.0	−4.0
Labour	Doug Masterton	1,459	19.9	+2.2
Alliance for Green Socialism	Brian Jackson	275	3.8	+0.8
Majority		1,791	24.4	+9.2
Turnout		7,329	41.8	−11.4
Conservative hold		Swing	+4.6	

Ardsley & Robin Hood
Party	Candidate	Votes	%	±%
Labour	Lisa Mulherin*	1,884	35.8	+4.2
Conservative	David Boynton	1,372	26.1	+4.6
BNP	John Hirst	1,182	22.5	+4.1
Liberal Democrats	Philip Moore	821	15.6	+2.6
Majority		512	9.7	−0.4
Turnout		5,259	33.5	−5.6
Labour hold		Swing	-0.2	

Armley
Party	Candidate	Votes	%	±%
Labour	Janet Harper*	2,214	42.1	−0.3
BNP	Bernard Allen	921	17.5	+4.9
Green	Jacqueline Nelson	740	14.1	−1.8
Conservative	Glenn Broadbent	713	13.5	−3.7
Liberal Democrats	Christine Golton	677	12.9	+1.0
Majority		1,293	24.6	−0.5
Turnout		5,265	30.5	−5.2
Labour hold		Swing	-2.6	

Beeston & Holbeck
Party	Candidate	Votes	%	±%
Labour	David Congreve*	1,981	39.6	+8.5
Liberal Democrats	James Fuller	1,174	23.5	+6.8
BNP	Dean Taylor	899	18.0	+4.5
Conservative	Robert Winfield	695	13.9	−2.4
Green	Neil Green	254	5.1	−0.4
Majority		807	16.1	+1.7
Turnout		5,003	31.6	−6.0
Labour hold		Swing	+0.8	

Bramley & Stanningley
Party	Candidate	Votes	%	±%
Labour	Neil Taggart*	2,005	40.5	+0.8
BNP	Sandra Cockayne	882	17.8	+5.0
Liberal Democrats	Adam Slack	803	16.2	−7.9
Conservative	Michael Best	780	15.8	+0.7
Green	Pamela Brown	347	7.0	−1.4
BPP	Edmond Morrison	135	2.7	+2.7
Majority		1,123	22.7	+7.1
Turnout		4,952	30.2	−7.5
Labour hold		Swing	-2.1	

Burmantofts & Richmond Hill
Party	Candidate	Votes	%	±%
Liberal Democrats	David Hollingsworth*	2,182	42.3	+2.3
Labour	John Hardy	1,634	31.7	−0.1
BNP	Mark Collett	1,124	21.8	+6.0
Conservative	Simon O'Riordan	214	4.2	−0.8
Majority		548	10.6	+2.4
Turnout		5,154	33.8	−5.9
Liberal Democrats hold		Swing	+1.2	

Calverley & Farsley
Party	Candidate	Votes	%	±%
Conservative	Frank Robinson*	3,272	46.9	−6.2
Labour	Andrew Jarosz	1,773	25.4	+5.3
BNP	Robert Leary	987	14.1	+14.1
Liberal Democrats	Laura Harmes	944	13.5	−1.8
Majority		1,499	21.5	−11.5
Turnout		6,976	40.5	−6.4
Conservative hold		Swing	-5.7	

Chapel Allerton
Party	Candidate	Votes	%	±%
Labour	Jane Dowson*	2,914	47.1	+10.5
Liberal Democrats	Timothy Herberd	1,720	27.8	+2.1
Conservative	Simon Baker	647	10.5	+0.1
Alliance for Green Socialism	Garth Frankland	558	9.0	−8.2
Green	Mark Elliot	352	5.7	−4.4
Majority		1,194	19.3	+8.3
Turnout		6,191	36.5	−1.4
Labour hold		Swing	+4.2	

City & Hunslet
Party	Candidate	Votes	%	±%
Labour	Mohammed Iqbal*	1,884	46.9	+5.2
Liberal Democrats	Paul Swain	1,143	28.5	+6.3
Conservative	Simon Church	437	10.9	−3.3
Green	Michael Northfield	300	7.5	−2.8
Respect	Sally Kincaid	252	6.3	+6.3
Majority		741	18.5	−1.0
Turnout		4,016	26.7	−3.7
Labour hold		Swing	-0.5	

Cross Gates & Whinmoor
Party	Candidate	Votes	%	±%
Labour	Peter Gruen*	2,455	39.1	−2.0
Conservative	Margaret Schofield	1,972	31.4	−0.7
BNP	Martin Gibson	924	14.7	+4.0
Liberal Democrats	Aqila Choudhry	588	9.4	+0.9
Green	Lee Mortimer	347	5.5	+5.5
Majority		483	7.7	−1.3
Turnout		6,286	37.1	−0.7
Labour hold		Swing	-0.6	

Farnley & Wortley
Party	Candidate	Votes	%	±%
Green	Luke Russell	2,324	38.8	−12.2
Labour	Stephen Towler	1,657	27.6	+6.4
BNP	Peter Maverick	992	16.5	+4.5
Conservative	George Firth	630	10.5	−0.5
Liberal Democrats	Alistair Bradley	354	5.9	+1.2
Alliance for Green Socialism	Declan Normaschild	40	0.7	+0.7
Majority		667	11.1	−18.6
Turnout		5,997	34.3	−6.1
Green hold		Swing	-9.3	

Garforth & Swillington
Party	Candidate	Votes	%	±%
Labour	Thomas Murray*	3,311	41.5	+7.2
Conservative	Alan Lamb	3,043	38.1	+5.1
BNP	John Powell	988	12.4	−0.3
Liberal Democrats	Ann Norman	643	8.1	−12.0
Majority		268	3.4	+2.2
Turnout		7,985	50.5	+1.4
Labour hold		Swing	+1.0	

Gipton & Harehills
Party	Candidate	Votes	%	±%
Labour	Roger Harington*	2,766	47.9	+4.3
Liberal Democrats	Andrew Tear	2,577	44.7	−3.1
Conservative	Beatrice Greenwood	262	4.5	+0.1
Alliance for Green Socialism	Azar Iqbal	166	2.9	−1.4
Majority		189	3.3	−0.8
Turnout		5,771	37.2	−8.7
Labour hold		Swing	+3.7	

Guiseley & Rawdon
Party	Candidate	Votes	%	±%
Conservative	John Bale*	2,901	42.2	+0.3
Labour	Michael King	1,813	26.4	+4.6
Liberal Democrats	Lucinda Cleasby	1,080	15.7	−1.6
BNP	Wayne Taylor	617	9.0	+1.6
Green	Colin Avison	412	6.0	−3.2
Alliance for Green Socialism	Gareth Christie	55	0.8	−1.7
Majority		1,088	15.8	−4.4
Turnout		6,878	41.3	−6.3
Conservative hold		Swing	-2.1	

Harewood
Party	Candidate	Votes	%	±%
Conservative	Alec Shelbrooke*	4,409	62.3	−1.0
Labour	Hayley Johnson	907	12.8	−2.9
BNP	Joanna Beverley	767	10.8	+10.8
Liberal Democrats	Joanne Hall	680	9.6	−7.2
Green	Murray Ford	275	3.9	+3.9
Alliance for Green Socialism	Fiona Christie	36	0.5	−3.6
Majority		3,502	49.5	+3.0
Turnout		7,074	48.1	−4.5
Conservative hold		Swing	+0.5	

Headingley
Party	Candidate	Votes	%	±%
Liberal Democrats	Martin Hamilton*	1,067	41.7	−2.9
Labour	Katherine Mitchell	641	25.0	+5.9
Green	Lesley Jeffries	469	18.3	−1.2
Conservative	Christopher Wales	299	11.7	+2.5
Alliance for Green Socialism	Sequoyah de Souza Vigneswaren	84	3.3	−4.3
Majority		426	16.6	−8.5
Turnout		2,560	18.9	−3.2
Liberal Democrats hold		Swing	-4.4	

Horsforth
Party	Candidate	Votes	%	±%
Liberal Democrats	Brian Cleasby*	2,585	38.4	−2.7
Conservative	John Hardcastle	2,488	37.0	+10.0
Labour	Lucinda Yeadon	954	14.2	+1.8
Green	Andrea Binns	566	8.4	+1.0
CPA	Paul Hellyer	140	2.1	+2.1
Majority		97	1.4	−12.8
Turnout		6,733	39.3	−8.9
Liberal Democrats hold		Swing	-6.3	

Hyde Park & Woodhouse
Party	Candidate	Votes	%	±%
Liberal Democrats	Linda Rhodes-Clayton*	1,099	38.8	−8.9
Labour	Mina Kainyek	1,072	37.9	+8.4
Green	Tim Sunderland	501	17.7	+17.7
Alliance for Green Socialism	Muhammad Arfan	79	2.8	−9.8
Independent	Giles Neafcy	79	2.8	+2.8
Majority		27	1.0	−17.3
Turnout		2,830	18.5	−8.1
Liberal Democrats hold		Swing	-8.6	

Killingbeck & Seacroft
Party	Candidate	Votes	%	±%
Labour	Brian Selby*	2,696	52.1	+1.2
Labour	Vonnie Morgan	2,417		
BNP	George Geapin	1,017	19.6	+1.8
Liberal Democrats	Margaret Tait	872	16.8	−1.5
BNP	Richard Warrington	860		
Liberal Democrats	Sadie Fisher	848		
Conservative	Caroline Anderson	592	11.4	−1.5
Conservative	Donald Townsley	542		
Majority		1,679	32.5	−0.1
Turnout		5,177	15.8	−22.0
Labour hold		Swing		
Labour hold		Swing	-0.3	

Kippax & Methley
Party	Candidate	Votes	%	±%
Labour	Keith Wakefield*	3,422	52.9	−0.2
Conservative	Tina Phillips	1,287	19.9	−2.1
BNP	Lisa Crossley	1,126	17.4	+4.9
Liberal Democrats	Barbara Thompson	635	9.8	−2.6
Majority		2,135	33.0	+1.9
Turnout		6,470	41.2	−2.8
Labour hold		Swing	+0.9	

Kirkstall
Party	Candidate	Votes	%	±%
Labour	Bernard Atha*	2,149	45.5	+5.1
Liberal Democrats	Christine Coleman	1,546	32.7	+2.9
Green	Martin Reed	537	11.4	+0.0
Conservative	Benjamin Jackson	489	10.4	−1.3
Majority		603	12.8	+2.2
Turnout		4,721	29.2	−8.2
Labour hold		Swing	+1.1	

Middleton Park
Party	Candidate	Votes	%	±%
Labour	Debra Coupar	2,123	42.6	+1.7
BNP	Kevin Meeson	1,424	28.6	+7.5
Conservative	Richard Barker	860	17.3	−4.3
Liberal Democrats	Benedict Chastney	578	11.6	−4.9
Majority		699	14.0	−5.3
Turnout		4,985	29.4	−4.1
Labour hold		Swing	-2.9	

Moortown
Party	Candidate	Votes	%	±%
Liberal Democrats	Richard Harker*	2,385	33.8	−12.5
Labour	Gerald Harper	2,241	31.7	+9.8
Conservative	Lyn Buckley	2,060	29.2	+3.9
Alliance for Green Socialism	Michael Davies	380	5.4	−1.2
Majority		145	2.1	−18.9
Turnout		7,067	41.1	−6.5
Liberal Democrats hold		Swing	-11.1	

Morley North
Party	Candidate	Votes	%	±%
Morley Borough Independent	Thomas Leadley*	2,959	42.4	−3.9
BNP	Thomas Redmond	1,491	21.4	+8.4
Labour	Neil Dawson	1,370	19.7	+3.1
Conservative	William Flynn	802	11.5	−2.5
Liberal Democrats	Levent Akbulut	350	5.0	−0.3
Majority		1,468	21.0	−8.8
Turnout		6,972	39.9	−4.2
Morley Borough Independent hold		Swing	-6.1	

Morley South
Party	Candidate	Votes	%	±%
BNP	Christopher Beverley	2,083	32.9	+15.6
Morley Borough Independent	Michael Elliott	1,790	28.3	−4.7
Labour	Sherry Bradley	1,407	22.3	−3.8
Conservative	Keely Jamieson	550	8.7	−0.1
Liberal Democrats	John Skinner	317	5.0	−0.7
Independent	Charles Slingsby	175	2.8	−6.3
Majority		383	4.6	−2.4
Turnout		6,322	39.1	−1.4
BNP gain from Morley Borough Independent		Swing	+10.1	

Otley & Yeadon
Party	Candidate	Votes	%	±%
Liberal Democrats	Ryk Downes*	3,159	38.7	+7.5
Conservative	Nigel Francis	2,290	28.1	+5.0
Labour	John Eveleigh	1,782	21.8	+0.9
BNP	Mark Gates	551	6.7	+1.6
Green	David Webb	297	3.6	−13.8
Alliance for Green Socialism	Wendy Frankland	84	1.0	−1.2
Majority		869	10.6	+2.4
Turnout		8,163	47.1	−4.7
Liberal Democrats hold		Swing	+1.2	

Pudsey
Party	Candidate	Votes	%	±%
Labour	Mick Coulson*	2,499	36.8	−5.6
Conservative	Barry White	2,122	31.2	+0.9
BNP	Angela Day	1,115	16.4	+4.4
Liberal Democrats	Jason McCartney	678	10.0	−5.2
Green	Irene Dracup	377	5.6	+5.6
Majority		377	5.6	−6.5
Turnout		6,791	40.1	−5.5
Labour hold		Swing	-3.2	

Rothwell
Party	Candidate	Votes	%	±%
Liberal Democrats	Stewart Golton	2,323	40.7	−2.3
Labour	Karen Bruce	1,954	34.2	−0.2
BNP	Tracy Andrews	823	14.4	+3.0
Conservative	Dorothy Flynn	613	10.7	−0.5
Majority		369	6.5	−2.1
Turnout		5,713	37.2	−7.1
Liberal Democrats hold		Swing	-1.0	

Roundhay
Party	Candidate	Votes	%	±%
Conservative	Paul Wadsworth*	2,930	39.4	+5.7
Labour	Irene O'Grady	2,457	33.1	+6.2
Liberal Democrats	Carl Quilliam	1,213	16.3	−6.3
Green	Paul Ellis	598	8.1	−3.7
Alliance for Green Socialism	Malcolm Christie	230	3.1	−1.8
Majority		473	6.4	−0.5
Turnout		7,428	43.1	−11.1
Conservative hold		Swing	-0.2	

Temple Newsam
Party	Candidate	Votes	%	±%
Labour	Michael Lyons*	2,394	35.7	+1.1
Conservative	Elizabeth Hayes	1,967	29.3	−7.8
BNP	Peter Hollings	1,486	22.1	+10.4
Liberal Democrats	Keith Norman	867	12.9	−3.6
Majority		427	6.4	+3.9
Turnout		6,714	41.9	−3.8
Labour hold		Swing	+4.4	

Weetwood
Party	Candidate	Votes	%	±%
Liberal Democrats	Judith Chapman	2,550	43.6	+8.0
Conservative	Guy West	1,334	22.8	−4.3
Labour	Anne Cherry	1,089	18.6	−4.7
Green	Martin Hemingway	422	7.2	−6.7
BNP	Gillian Leake	370	6.3	+6.3
Alliance for Green Socialism	Daniel Kennedy	77	1.3	+1.3
Majority		1,216	20.8	+12.3
Turnout		5,842	33.8	−9.5
Liberal Democrats hold		Swing	+6.1	

Wetherby
Party	Candidate	Votes	%	±%
Conservative	John Procter*	3,842	57.0	−6.6
Labour	Andrew Robinson	1,069	15.9	−6.9
Liberal Democrats	James Matthews	955	14.2	+0.5
BNP	Ralph Nutter	873	13.0	+13.0
Majority		2,773	41.1	+0.3
Turnout		6,739	44.0	−5.7
Conservative hold		Swing	+0.1	
