= Garforth and Swillington (ward) =

Electoral ward in Leeds, England

- Garforth and Swillington highlighted within Leeds
- Population: 16,205 (2023 electorate)
- Metropolitan borough: City of Leeds
- Metropolitan county: West Yorkshire
- Region: Yorkshire and the Humber
- Country: England
- Sovereign state: United Kingdom
- UK Parliament: Leeds East
- Councillors: Mark Dobson (Garforth & Swillington Independents); Sarah Field (Garforth & Swillington Independents); Suzanne McCormack (Garforth & Swillington Independents)

Garforth and Swillington is an electoral ward of Leeds City Council in east Leeds, West Yorkshire, covering the town of Garforth as well as the villages of Great Preston and Swillington.

== Boundaries ==
The Garforth and Swillington ward includes the civil parishes of:

- Austhorpe (east half)
- Great and Little Preston
- Sturton Grange
- Swillington

== Councillors ==
Election	Councillor	Councillor	Councillor
1980	Greg Moakes (Lab) (Note: Moakes had been a Kippax and Swillington ward councillor since 1973.)	David Lambert (Lab)	Ernest Smith (Lab)
1982	Greg Moakes (Lab)	David Lambert (Lab)	David Schofield (Con)
1983	Greg Moakes (Lab)	David Lambert (Lab)	David Schofield (Con)
1984	Greg Moakes (Lab)	David Lambert (Lab)	David Schofield (Con) (Note: For the next election in 1986, Schofield successfully stood instead as the Conservative candidate for Halton ward and did not re-stand for Garforth and Swillington. He later represented Temple Newsam ward.)
1986	Greg Moakes (Lab)	David Lambert (Lab)	Alan Groves (Lab)
1987	Greg Moakes (Lab)	John Ratchford (Lab)	Alan Groves (Lab)
1988	Greg Moakes (Lab)	John Ratchford (Lab)	Alan Groves (Lab)
1990	Greg Moakes (Lab)	John Ratchford (Lab)	Alan Groves (Lab)
1991	Greg Moakes (Lab)	Shirley Haines (Lab)	Alan Groves (Lab)
1992	Thomas Murray (Lab)	Shirley Haines (Lab)	Alan Groves (Lab)
1994	Thomas Murray (Lab)	Shirley Haines (Lab)	Alan Groves (Lab)
1995	Thomas Murray (Lab)	Shirley Haines (Lab)	Alan Groves (Lab)
1996	Thomas Murray (Lab)	Shirley Haines (Lab)	Alan Groves (Lab)
1998	Thomas Murray (Lab)	Shirley Haines (Lab)	Karen Groves (Lab)
1999	Thomas Murray (Lab)	Alan Groves (Lab)	Karen Groves (Lab)
2000	Thomas Murray (Lab)	Alan Groves (Lab)	Karen Groves (Lab)
2002	Thomas Murray (Lab)	Alan Groves (Lab)	Karen Marshall (Lab) (Note: Groves stood under her new name of Karen Marshall. She lost her re-election bid at the 2004 election and, then Karen Bruce, was later elected for Rothwell ward in 2011.)
2003	Thomas Murray (Lab)	Andrea Harrison (Lab)	Karen Marshall (Lab)
2004	Thomas Murray (Lab)	Andrea Harrison (Lab)	Mark Phillips (Con)
2006	Thomas Murray (Lab)	Andrea Harrison (Lab)	Mark Phillips (Con)
2007	Thomas Murray (Lab)	Andrea Harrison (Lab)	Mark Dobson (Lab)
2008	Thomas Murray (Lab)	Andrea McKenna (Lab) (Note: Harrison had married Armley councillor James McKenna and taken his name since her last election.)	Mark Dobson (Lab)
2010	Thomas Murray (Lab)	Andrea McKenna (Lab)	Mark Dobson (Lab)
2011	Thomas Murray (Lab)	Andrea McKenna (Lab)	Mark Dobson (Lab)
2012	Thomas Murray (Lab)	Andrea McKenna (Lab)	Mark Dobson (Lab)
2014	Stuart McKenna (Lab)	Andrea McKenna (Lab)	Mark Dobson (Lab)
2015	Stuart McKenna (Lab)	Andrea McKenna (Lab)	Mark Dobson (Lab)
2016	Stuart McKenna (Lab)	Sarah Field (Lab)	Mark Dobson (Lab)
February 2017	Stuart McKenna (Lab)	Sarah Field (GSI)	Mark Dobson (GSI) (Note: Dobson resigned from the Labour council group to form and lead a new Garforth & Swillington Independents group on the council. He stated he was "increasingly uncomfortable with the direction and leadership of the Leeds Labour group." His ward colleague, Sarah Field, resigned the Labour whip three days later. She cited similar concerns to Dobson having "grown increasingly uneasy with the direction, priorities and manoeuvring of the Labour Group”.)
2018	Suzanne McCormack (GSI)	Sarah Field (GSI)	Mark Dobson (GSI)
2019	Suzanne McCormack (GSI)	Sarah Field (GSI)	Mark Dobson (GSI)
2021	Suzanne McCormack (GSI)	Sarah Field (GSI)	Mark Dobson (GSI)
2022	Suzanne McCormack (GSI)	Sarah Field (GSI)	Mark Dobson (GSI)
2023	Suzanne McCormack (GSI)	Sarah Field (GSI)	Mark Dobson (GSI)
2024	Suzanne McCormack (GSI)	Sarah Field (GSI)	Mark Dobson (GSI)
2026	Suzanne McCormack* (GSI)	Sarah Field* (GSI)	Mark Dobson* (GSI)

indicates seat up for re-election. indicates councillor defection. * indicates incumbent councillor.

== Elections since 2010 ==
=== May 2026 ===
2026
Party	Candidate	Votes	%	±%
Garforth and Swillington Independents	Mark Dobson*	5,007	62.4	▲8.1
Reform	David Ian Butterfield	1,582	19.7	▲14.4
Labour	David Patrick Nagle	542	6.8	▼12.4
Green	Alexander James Bull	433	5.4	▲1.2
Conservative	Peter Bentley	362	4.5	▼8.3
Liberal Democrats	Rebecca Cecilia Phillips	92	1.1	▼2.2
Majority		3,425	42.7	▲7.6
Turnout		8,034	48.8	▲8.9
Rejected ballots		16	0.2	
Registered electors		16,462		
Garforth and Swillington Independents hold		Swing	▲10.3	

=== May 2024 ===
2024
Party	Candidate	Votes	%	±%
Garforth and Swillington Independents	Sarah Field*	3,469	54.3	+0.3
Labour	Alex Rayment	1,223	19.2	−0.6
Conservative	Peter Bentley	778	12.8	−1.6
Reform	Kieran White	336	5.3	New
Green	Patrick Lynott	266	4.2	−1.9
Liberal Democrats	Jake Knox	209	3.3	+0.2
Independent	Tyler Wilson-Kerr	105	1.6	−0.8
Majority		2,246	35.1	+0.9
Turnout		6,424	39.9	+0.7
Garforth and Swillington Independents hold		Swing	+0.5	

=== May 2023 ===
2023
Party	Candidate	Votes	%	±%
Garforth and Swillington Independents	Suzanne McCormack*	3,428	54.0	−9.0
Labour	Luke Murrow	1,257	19.8	+4.3
Conservative	Peter Bentley	912	14.4	−1.5
Green	Stephen Beer	384	6.1	+2.5
Liberal Democrats	Jake Knox	195	3.1	+1.5
Independent	Tyler Wilson-Kerr	152	2.4	N/A
Majority		2,171	34.2	−12.9
Turnout		6,347	39.2	−4.7
Garforth and Swillington Independents hold		Swing		

=== May 2022 ===
2022
Party	Candidate	Votes	%	±%
Garforth and Swillington Independents	Mark Dobson*	4,488	63.0	+14.2
Conservative	Peter Youngs	1,133	15.9	−11.3
Labour	David Nagle	1,107	15.5	−1.5
Green	Stephen Beer	258	3.6	−1.9
Liberal Democrats	Jake Knox	117	1.6	+0.6
Majority		3,355	47.1	+25.5
Turnout		7,127	43.9%	−3.6
Garforth and Swillington Independents hold		Swing		

=== May 2021 ===
2021
Party	Candidate	Votes	%	±%
Garforth and Swillington Independents	Sarah Field*	3,780	48.8	−14.1
Conservative	Mark Barratt	2,105	27.2	+14.1
Labour	Michael Bailey	1,317	17.0	+0.1
Green	Steve Beer	420	5.5	N/A
Liberal Democrats	Jake Knox	79	1.0	−1.9
Majority		1,675	21.6	−24.4
Turnout		7,749	47.5	+7.8
Garforth and Swillington Independents hold		Swing		

=== May 2019 ===
2019
Party	Candidate	Votes	%	±%
Garforth and Swillington Independents	Suzanne McCormack*	4,007	62.9	+0.4
Labour	Mark Pratt	1,077	16.9	−0.7
Conservative	Linda Richards	837	13.1	−2.7
For Britain	Michael Bolton	265	4.2	+2.2
Liberal Democrats	Mitchell Galdas	186	2.9	+0.7
Majority		2,930	46.0	+1.1
Turnout		6,399	39.7	−10
Garforth and Swillington Independents hold		Swing	+0.6	

=== May 2018 ===
2018
Party	Candidate	Votes	%	±%
Garforth and Swillington Independents	Mark Dobson*	5,377	62.5	N/A
Garforth and Swillington Independents	Sarah Field*	4,738		
Garforth and Swillington Independents	Suzanne McCormack	4,361		
Labour	Annie Maloney	1,512	17.6	−37.6
Labour	Mark Pratt	1,505		
Conservative	Joseph Blunt	1,358	15.8	−10.8
Labour	Mirelle Midgley	1,354		
Conservative	Linda Richards	1,311		
Conservative	Jordan Young	1,181		
Liberal Democrats	Christine Golton	190	2.2	−0.1
For Britain	Michael Bolton	168	2.0	N/A
Majority		3,865	44.9	+16.3
Turnout		16,203	49.7	+9.1
Garforth and Swillington Independents gain from Labour				
Garforth and Swillington Independents gain from Labour				
Garforth and Swillington Independents gain from Labour				

=== May 2016 ===
2016
Party	Candidate	Votes	%	±%
Labour	Sarah Field	3,582	55.2	−2.0
Conservative	Daniel Farrell	1,726	26.6	−0.1
UKIP	Terry Harkin	862	13.3	+2.3
Green	Kieran White	175	2.7	−0.1
Liberal Democrats	Mitchell Galdas	147	2.3	+0
Majority		1,856	28.6	−4.0
Turnout		6,492	40.6	
Labour hold		Swing		

=== May 2015 ===
2015
Party	Candidate	Votes	%	±%
Labour	Mark Dobson*	6,737	57.2	−6.9
Conservative	Daniel Farrell	3,137	26.7	−5.7
UKIP	Mark Maniatt	1,297	11.0	+11.0
Green	Lesley Jeffries	327	2.8	+2.8
Liberal Democrats	Mitch Galdas	270	2.3	−1.1
Majority		3,600	30.6	−1.1
Turnout		11,768	72.4	
Labour hold		Swing	-0.6	

=== May 2014 ===
2014
Party	Candidate	Votes	%	±%
Labour	Stuart McKenna	3,172	51.7	
Conservative	Ryan Stephenson	2,027	33.0	
Green	Yvonne Murray	709	11.6	
Liberal Democrats	Mitch Gladas	227	3.7	
Majority		1,145		
Turnout		6,135	38.5	
Labour hold		Swing		

=== May 2012 ===
2012
Party	Candidate	Votes	%	±%
Labour	Andrea McKenna*	3,499	58.0	−6.2
Conservative	Louise Turner	1,785	29.6	−2.8
English Democrat	Stephen Elliot	544	9.0	+9.0
Liberal Democrats	Christine Golton	208	3.4	+0.0
Majority		1,714	28.4	−3.3
Turnout		6,036		
Labour hold		Swing	-1.7	

=== May 2011 ===
2011
Party	Candidate	Votes	%	±%
Labour	Mark Dobson*	4,906	64.1	+20.4
Conservative	Ryan Stephenson	2,479	32.4	−2.2
Liberal Democrats	Christine Golton	263	3.4	−12.4
Majority		2,427	31.7	+22.5
Turnout		7,648	48	
Labour hold		Swing	+11.3	

=== May 2010 ===
2010
Party	Candidate	Votes	%	±%
Labour	Thomas Murray*	5,007	43.8	+1.2
Conservative	Ryan Stephenson	3,955	34.6	−4.6
Liberal Democrats	Simon Dowling	1,811	15.8	+8.3
BNP	Graham Misson	668	5.8	−4.8
Majority		1,052	9.2	+5.9
Turnout		11,441	71.8	+27.1
Labour hold		Swing	+2.9	
