= John Procter (politician) =

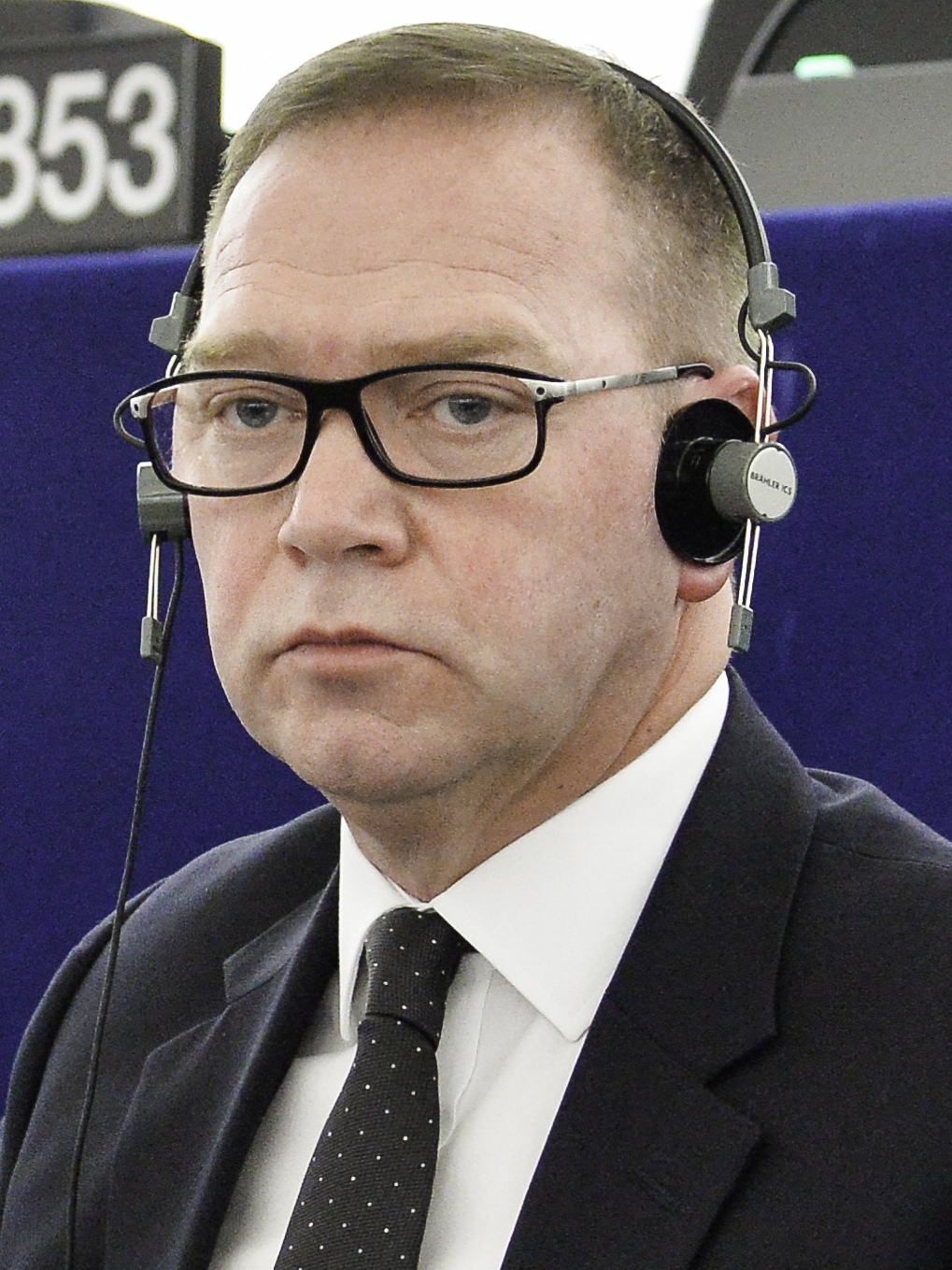
- Procter in 2017

Chair of Royal Armouries
- Incumbent
- Assumed office 2 November 2019
- Preceded by: The Lord Dannatt; Hemant Patel (Interim)

Member of the European Parliament for Yorkshire and the Humber
- In office 17 November 2016 – 1 July 2019
- Preceded by: Timothy Kirkhope
- Succeeded by: Shaffaq Mohammed

Leeds City Councillor for Wetherby Ward
- In office 24 July 1992 – 2018
- Preceded by: John Evans
- Succeeded by: Norma Harrington

Personal details
- Born: 7 November 1966 (age 59) Leeds, England
- Party: Conservative
- Spouse: Rachael Procter
- Children: 2
- Website: https://www.johnprocter.co.uk

John Michael Procter (born 7 November 1966) is the current Chair of the Royal Armouries and a former Conservative Member of the European Parliament (MEP). His term as Chair ended on 1 November 2023.

== Political career ==
Procter was first elected to Leeds City Council for Wetherby ward in a July 1992 by-election and served until 2018, following his deselection by Conservative Party members in September 2017. He had previously stood for Barwick and Kippax ward in 1990 and 1991.

During his time as a Leeds City Councillor for over 25 years, Procter served as Chief Whip of the council between 2004 and 2010 and Deputy Leader of the council's Conservative Group from 2015 to 2018.

He unsuccessfully contested Barnsley East in the 1992 general election and Pudsey in 2001.

=== Member of the European Parliament ===
Procter was placed third on the Conservative Party's closed list of candidates for the Yorkshire and the Humber constituency in the 2014 European Parliament election. Only the first Conservative candidate, incumbent Timothy Kirkhope, was elected as a Member of the European Parliament following the election.

In November 2017, he was nominated by the Conservatives to replace Kirkhope after his appointment to the House of Lords in 2016 Prime Minister's Resignation Honours. The party chose Procter rather than Alex Story, who had been second on the party's closed list in 2014.

== Personal life ==
Procter is married to Rachael, a Leeds City Councillor for Harewood ward from 2004 to 2018.

He ran a facilities management company before being appointed as Managing Director of an optical supplier, Dunelm Optical, in 2019. Procter was a Board Member of Leeds Grand Theatre between 2007 and 2017, including three years as Chair between 2007 and 2010. Since 2008, Procter has also been a Board Member of the Northern Ballet.
