= 1995 Leeds City Council election =

Local Government Election

- 4 May 1995

33 of the 99 seats on Leeds City Council 50 seats needed for a majority
	First party	Second party	Third party
Party	Labour	Conservative	Liberal Democrats
Last election	27 seats, 51.3%	4 seats, 22.0%	3 seats, 24.1%
Seats won	30	1	3
Seats after	75	15	8
Seat change	▲8	▼8	Steady
Popular vote	103,585	34,137	32,340
Percentage	59.0%	19.4%	18.4%
Swing	▲7.7pp	▼2.6pp	▼5.7pp
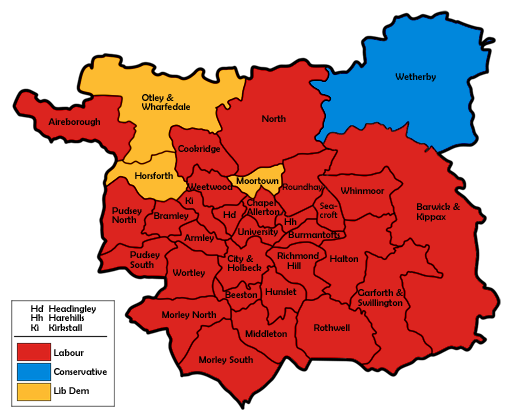
- Map of the results for the 1995 Leeds council election.

The 1995 Leeds City Council elections were held on Thursday, 4 May 1995, with one third of the council up for election, alongside a vacancy in Roundhay.

Labour won another victory over the opposition parties, winning a record number of wards as the Labour gains extended further into Conservative heartland. A disastrous result for the Tories saw them fall even further from the record lows they set the year before, losing Cookridge, North and Roundhay for the first time - with Wetherby their sole defence. Labour gained eight in total, securing second councillors in the previously reliable Conservative wards of Aireborough, Halton, Pudsey North and Weetwood. As a result, Labour represented over three-quarters of the council with a formidable majority of 51.

Having overtaken the Conservative vote the previous year, the Lib Dems fell behind again, but unlike the Conservatives were able to defend their three seats. As such, the holding up of the Labour's vote from strong figure achieved the year before was enough to win them their greatest share, amidst a poor turnout of 32.5%.

Elsewhere, the Greens firmed up their second place in Wortley and increased their slate to cover half of the wards, whilst the Liberals fielded one fewer to match the number of Independents - all three of which making little impact. The leftist splinters from Labour, Militant Labour, and the now-defunct CPGB, Communist Party of Britain also fielded a first candidate each.

== Election result ==
Leeds local election result 1995
Party	Seats	Gains	Losses	Net gain/loss	Seats %	Votes %	Votes	+/−
Labour	30	8	0	+8	88.2	59.0	103,585	+7.7
Liberal Democrats	3	0	0	0	8.8	18.4	32,340	-5.7
Conservative	1	0	8	-8	2.9	19.4	34,137	-2.6
Green	0	0	0	0	0.0	2.3	3,964	+0.4
Liberal	0	0	0	0	0.0	0.4	739	-0.3
Militant Labour	0	0	0	0	0.0	0.2	368	+0.2
Independent	0	0	0	0	0.0	0.2	354	+0.2
Communist	0	0	0	0	0.0	0.0	57	+0.0

This result has the following consequences for the total number of seats on the council after the elections:

Party	Previous council	New council
Labour	67	75
Conservative	23	15
Liberal Democrat	8	8
Independent	1	1
Total	99	99
Working majority	35	51

== Ward results ==
Aireborough
Party	Candidate	Votes	%	±%
Labour	M. Dunn	3,939	50.5	+3.2
Conservative	M. Atkinson	2,971	38.1	+8.7
Liberal Democrats	D. Gowland	896	11.5	−11.9
Majority		968	12.4	−5.4
Turnout		7,806		
Labour gain from Conservative		Swing	-2.7	

Armley
Party	Candidate	Votes	%	±%
Labour	P. Paley	3,085	70.3	+9.3
Conservative	Glenn Broadbent	429	9.8	−1.9
Liberal	George Lawson	426	9.7	−5.2
Liberal Democrats	Andrew Davies	285	6.5	−5.9
Green	Quentin Cooper	164	3.7	+3.7
Majority		2,656	60.5	+14.4
Turnout		4,389		
Labour hold		Swing	+5.6	

Barwick & Kippax
Party	Candidate	Votes	%	±%
Labour	M. Monks	4,742	71.2	+7.0
Conservative	Christopher Ward	1,267	19.0	−3.3
Liberal Democrats	David Lindley	650	9.8	−3.7
Majority		3,475	52.2	+10.3
Turnout		6,659		
Labour hold		Swing	+5.1	

Beeston
Party	Candidate	Votes	%	±%
Labour	P. Bellwood	2,654	77.1	+7.0
Conservative	H. Woodhead	412	12.0	−3.7
Liberal Democrats	Stephen Sadler	328	9.5	−4.7
Green	Tania Jackson	50	1.5	+1.5
Majority		2,242	65.1	+10.7
Turnout		3,444		
Labour hold		Swing	+5.3	

Bramley
Party	Candidate	Votes	%	±%
Labour	A. Ross	3,335	79.1	+6.7
Conservative	R. Netzel	340	8.1	−1.3
Liberal Democrats	Nigel Amor	306	7.3	−4.9
Liberal	Elizabeth Bee	234	5.6	−0.6
Majority		2,995	71.1	+10.8
Turnout		4,215		
Labour hold		Swing	+4.0	

Burmantofts
Party	Candidate	Votes	%	±%
Labour	Patrick Hennigan	2,878	64.9	+10.1
Liberal Democrats	Alan Kimber	1,392	31.4	−10.5
Conservative	Graham Castle	164	3.7	+0.4
Majority		1,486	33.5	+20.6
Turnout		4,434		
Labour hold		Swing	+10.3	

Chapel Allerton
Party	Candidate	Votes	%	±%
Labour	Norma Hutchinson	3,500	73.6	+7.6
Conservative	I. Baxter	621	13.1	−2.6
Liberal Democrats	Ian Findlay	430	9.0	−2.9
Green	C. Ni Bhean	147	3.1	−3.3
Communist	S. Nolan	57	1.2	+1.2
Majority		2,879	60.5	+10.2
Turnout		4,755		
Labour hold		Swing	+5.1	

City & Holbeck
Party	Candidate	Votes	%	±%
Labour	I. Coulthard	2,735	77.0	+2.8
Liberal Democrats	Pauline Bardon	363	10.2	+2.3
Conservative	David Boynton	254	7.1	−1.9
Green	D. Blakemore	201	5.7	+1.4
Majority		2,372	66.8	+1.6
Turnout		3,553		
Labour hold		Swing	+0.2	

Cookridge
Party	Candidate	Votes	%	±%
Labour	A. Procter	2,551	40.8	+11.1
Conservative	A. Wheatley	2,484	39.7	−1.3
Liberal Democrats	David Pratt	1,218	19.5	−9.7
Majority		67	1.1	−10.2
Turnout		6,253		
Labour gain from Conservative		Swing	+6.2	

Garforth & Swillington
Party	Candidate	Votes	%	±%
Labour	S. Haines	5,056	72.9	+7.2
Liberal Democrats	Ian Dowling	984	14.2	−1.8
Conservative	Jack Stott	895	12.9	−5.4
Majority		4,072	58.7	+11.3
Turnout		6,935		
Labour hold		Swing	+4.5	

Halton
Party	Candidate	Votes	%	±%
Labour	D. McGee	3,734	57.8	+7.5
Conservative	William Hyde	1,995	30.9	−2.4
Liberal Democrats	Andrew Appleyard	568	8.8	−7.6
Green	David Harbud	162	2.5	+2.5
Majority		1,739	26.9	+9.8
Turnout		6,459		
Labour gain from Conservative		Swing	+4.9	

Harehills
Party	Candidate	Votes	%	±%
Labour	J. Clare	3,070	81.0	+13.1
Conservative	T. Gerrard	293	7.7	−4.3
Liberal Democrats	R. Senior	286	7.5	−7.9
Green	M. Elliot	140	3.7	−0.9
Majority		2,777	73.3	+20.8
Turnout		3,789		
Labour hold		Swing	+8.7	

Headingley
Party	Candidate	Votes	%	±%
Labour	P. Moxon	3,071	68.8	+9.1
Liberal Democrats	B. Thompson	621	13.9	−6.6
Conservative	A. Hainsworth	464	10.4	−2.0
Green	P. Alexander	306	6.9	−0.6
Majority		2,450	54.9	+15.7
Turnout		4,462		
Labour hold		Swing	+7.8	

Horsforth
Party	Candidate	Votes	%	±%
Liberal Democrats	B. Cleasby	2,794	43.6	−11.6
Labour	R. Haggerty	1,977	30.9	+12.2
Conservative	R. Whitehead	1,558	24.3	−1.8
Independent	A. Gale	79	1.2	+1.2
Majority		817	12.7	−16.4
Turnout		6,408		
Liberal Democrats hold		Swing	-11.9	

Hunslet
Party	Candidate	Votes	%	±%
Labour	J. Erskine	2,708	85.7	+4.0
Liberal Democrats	G. Melnick	191	6.0	−3.7
Conservative	J. Eastwood	170	5.4	−3.2
Green	G. Duncan	91	2.9	+2.9
Majority		2,517	79.7	+7.8
Turnout		3,160		
Labour hold		Swing	+3.8	

Kirkstall
Party	Candidate	Votes	%	±%
Labour	J. Illingworth	3,400	77.3	+7.8
Green	A. Mander	416	9.5	+9.5
Liberal Democrats	D. Freeman	256	5.8	−6.6
Conservative	F. McKimmings	248	5.6	−2.0
Liberal	N. Nowosielski	79	1.8	+1.8
Majority		2,984	67.8	+10.7
Turnout		4,399		
Labour hold		Swing	-0.8	

Middleton
Party	Candidate	Votes	%	±%
Labour	R. Finnigan	3,162	83.3	+5.7
Conservative	S. McBarron	302	8.0	−2.4
Liberal Democrats	Q. Brown	227	6.0	−6.1
Green	A. Blackburn	107	2.8	+2.8
Majority		2,860	75.3	+9.8
Turnout		3,798		
Labour hold		Swing	+4.0	

Moortown
Party	Candidate	Votes	%	±%
Liberal Democrats	C. Brett	2,932	49.6	−8.2
Labour	M. Hughes	1,871	31.6	+10.7
Conservative	J. Dagwell	989	16.7	−4.6
Independent	H. Alexander	123	2.1	+2.1
Majority		1,061	17.9	−18.6
Turnout		5,915		
Liberal Democrats hold		Swing	-9.4	

Morley North
Party	Candidate	Votes	%	±%
Labour	P. Jones	3,782	66.4	+9.0
Conservative	J. Galek	1,142	20.0	−8.4
Liberal Democrats	M. Betteridge	509	8.9	−5.2
Green	T. Sykes	264	4.6	+4.6
Majority		2,640	46.3	+17.4
Turnout		5,697		
Labour hold		Swing	+8.7	

Morley South
Party	Candidate	Votes	%	±%
Labour	R. Mitchell	3,509	63.4	+5.4
Liberal Democrats	T. Leadley	1,283	23.2	−4.5
Conservative	A. Grayson	741	13.4	−0.9
Majority		2,226	40.2	+9.9
Turnout		5,533		
Labour hold		Swing	+4.9	

North
Party	Candidate	Votes	%	±%
Labour	J. Sully	2,047	35.2	+8.2
Conservative	R. Feldman	1,956	33.6	−5.2
Liberal Democrats	S. Umpleby	1,721	29.6	−2.4
Green	P. Harris	90	1.5	−0.6
Majority		91	1.6	−5.2
Turnout		5,814		
Labour gain from Conservative		Swing	+6.7	

Otley & Wharfedale
Party	Candidate	Votes	%	±%
Liberal Democrats	G. Kirkland	3,295	40.8	+1.6
Labour	J. Eveleigh	2,753	34.1	+6.1
Conservative	J. Bird	2,022	25.1	−6.4
Majority		542	6.7	−1.1
Turnout		8,070		
Liberal Democrats hold		Swing	-2.2	

Pudsey North
Party	Candidate	Votes	%	±%
Labour	T. Spamer	3,601	51.3	+8.6
Conservative	I. Favell	2,391	34.1	+3.4
Liberal Democrats	R. Cam	1,029	14.7	−12.0
Majority		1,210	17.2	+5.1
Turnout		7,021		
Labour gain from Conservative		Swing	+2.6	

Pudsey South
Party	Candidate	Votes	%	±%
Labour	J. Jarosz	3,397	56.5	+9.8
Liberal Democrats	R. Keighley	1,821	30.3	−9.7
Conservative	G. Winnard	797	13.3	−0.1
Majority		1,576	26.2	+19.5
Turnout		6,015		
Labour hold		Swing	+9.7	

Richmond Hill
Party	Candidate	Votes	%	±%
Labour	M. Simmons	3,095	84.7	+6.9
Liberal Democrats	K. Norman	385	10.5	−3.9
Conservative	W. Birch	176	4.8	−3.0
Majority		2,710	74.1	+10.8
Turnout		3,656		
Labour hold		Swing	+5.4	

Rothwell
Party	Candidate	Votes	%	±%
Labour	B. Walker	3,481	72.8	+7.8
Liberal Democrats	M. Galdas	780	16.3	−3.0
Conservative	R. Heeson	521	10.9	−4.9
Majority		2,701	56.5	+10.8
Turnout		4,782		
Labour hold		Swing	+5.4	

Roundhay
Party	Candidate	Votes	%	±%
Labour	D. Lewis	2,839	43.8	+12.1
Labour	J. White	2,765		
Conservative	M. Burnell	2,186	33.7	−5.3
Conservative	J. Suttenstall	2,148		
Liberal Democrats	J. Sefton	1,193	18.4	−8.1
Liberal Democrats	W. Pickard	1,057		
Green	A. Ketchin	260	4.0	+1.3
Majority		653	10.1	+2.8
Turnout		6,478		
Labour gain from Conservative		Swing		
Labour gain from Conservative		Swing	+8.7	

Seacroft
Party	Candidate	Votes	%	±%
Labour	D. Gabb	3,298	85.4	+1.8
Liberal Democrats	S. Fisher	299	7.7	−1.4
Conservative	R. Jones	266	6.9	−0.4
Majority		2,999	77.6	+3.1
Turnout		3,863		
Labour hold		Swing	+1.6	

University
Party	Candidate	Votes	%	±%
Labour	G. Harper	2,522	69.8	+6.2
Militant Labour	C. Hill	368	10.2	+10.2
Liberal Democrats	A. Norman	279	7.7	−6.4
Conservative	R. Winfield	241	6.7	−2.5
Green	A. Begg	205	5.7	−7.5
Majority		2,154	63.5	+14.1
Turnout		3,615		
Labour hold		Swing	-2.0	

Weetwood
Party	Candidate	Votes	%	±%
Labour	G. Platt	2,837	42.8	+2.4
Liberal Democrats	J. Ewens	2,500	37.7	+3.0
Conservative	D. Boulton	1,134	17.1	−7.7
Green	C. Nash	153	2.3	+2.3
Majority		337	5.1	−0.5
Turnout		6,624		
Labour gain from Conservative		Swing	-0.3	

Wetherby
Party	Candidate	Votes	%	±%
Conservative	D. Hudson	3,518	46.4	−3.8
Labour	R. Steel	2,407	31.7	+11.3
Liberal Democrats	P. Boughton	1,662	21.9	−7.5
Majority		1,111	14.6	−6.2
Turnout		7,587		
Conservative hold		Swing	-7.5	

Whinmoor
Party	Candidate	Votes	%	±%
Labour	E. Pickard	3,149	71.0	+7.2
Conservative	W. Hanbury	728	16.4	−5.0
Liberal Democrats	G. Roberts	405	9.1	−5.6
Independent	A. Thorpe	152	3.4	+3.4
Majority		2,421	54.6	+12.2
Turnout		4,434		
Labour hold		Swing	+6.1	

Wortley
Party	Candidate	Votes	%	±%
Labour	F. Hamilton	3,400	61.6	+4.1
Green	D. Blackburn	1,208	21.9	+2.1
Conservative	M. Best	462	8.4	−3.2
Liberal Democrats	D. Brayshaw	452	8.2	−3.0
Majority		2,192	39.7	+2.0
Turnout		5,522		
Labour hold		Swing	+1.0	

== By-elections between 1995 and 1996 ==
Richmond Hill by-election 26 October 1995
Party	Candidate	Votes	%	±%
Labour	Michael Lyons	1,792	84.2	−0.5
Liberal Democrats		233	10.9	+0.4
Conservative		103	4.8	+0.0
Majority		1,559	73.3	−0.8
Turnout		2,128	15.0	−10.8
Labour hold		Swing	-0.4	
