= 1991 Leeds City Council election =

Leeds City council elections 1991

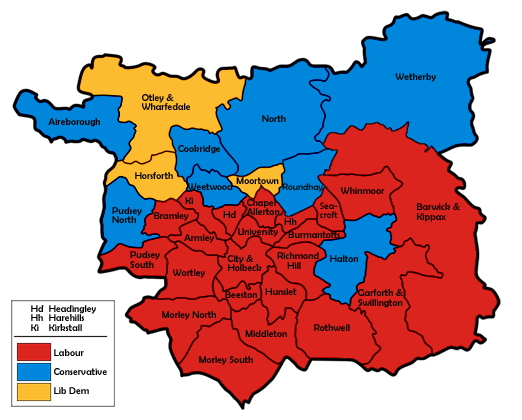
Map of the results for the 1991 Leeds council election.

The 1991 Leeds City Council elections were held on Thursday, 2 May 1991, with one third of the council and a vacancy in Horsforth to be elected.

The upsurge in Labour support recorded the previous year mostly unwound, allowing the Conservatives and the renamed Liberal Democrats a more successful election - although the latter also looked to be recovering from their disastrous merger, fielding a more convincing slate and gaining a moderate rise in their vote. The surprise Conservative losses of 1990 election were all defended this time round - although only narrowly in the case of Weetwood, with Halton and Pudsey North being much safer and Aireborough actually a gain from the Lib Dems. Labour managed a gain a seat apiece from the main opposition parties, with a comfortable win in Burmantofts from the Lib Dems and snatching the last Conservative seat in Morley North to further extend their record majority.

Meanwhile, the Greens stood in over a third of the wards - their strongest slate in over a decade, and the Liberals won third place in each of the handful of wards they stood in. Notably absent were the enduring CPGB and David Owen's Social Democrats, both parties having chosen to dissolve themselves by the time of election.

== Election result ==
Leeds local election result 1991
Party	Seats	Gains	Losses	Net gain/loss	Seats %	Votes %	Votes	+/−
Labour	22	2	0	+2	64.7	46.1	102,103	-10.0
Conservative	8	1	1	0	23.5	30.2	66,860	+3.5
Liberal Democrats	4	0	2	-2	11.8	20.2	44,631	+5.8
Green	0	0	0	0	0.0	1.9	4,219	+0.5
Liberal	0	0	0	0	0.0	1.5	3,265	+0.5
Independent	0	0	0	0	0.0	0.1	208	-0.1

This result has the following consequences for the total number of seats on the council after the elections:

Party	Previous council	New council
Labour	66	68
Conservative	21	21
Liberal Democrat	11	9
Independent	1	1
Total	99	99
Working majority	33	37

== Ward results ==
Aireborough
Party	Candidate	Votes	%	±%
Conservative	M. Atkinson	3,539	37.2	−0.8
Labour	Gerry Harper	3,073	32.3	−13.0
Liberal Democrats	Janet Brown	2,681	28.2	+11.4
Green	A. Ross	222	2.3	+2.3
Majority		466	4.9	−2.5
Turnout		9,515		
Conservative gain from Liberal Democrats		Swing	+6.1	

Armley
Party	Candidate	Votes	%	±%
Labour	P. Paley	3,384	57.1	−10.0
Conservative	W. Hanbury	1,024	17.3	+1.9
Liberal	A. Gonzalez	625	10.5	+10.5
Liberal Democrats	Andrew Davies	581	9.8	−7.8
Green	M. Stroud	315	5.3	+5.3
Majority		2,360	39.8	−9.6
Turnout		5,929		
Labour hold		Swing	-5.9	

Barwick & Kippax
Party	Candidate	Votes	%	±%
Labour	M. Monks	4,594	55.2	−7.5
Conservative	John Procter	2,476	29.7	+3.3
Liberal Democrats	D. Lindley	879	10.6	+4.3
Green	D. Fullerton	374	4.5	−0.1
Majority		2,118	25.4	−10.9
Turnout		8,323		
Labour hold		Swing	-5.4	

Beeston
Party	Candidate	Votes	%	±%
Labour	P. Bellwood	2,887	62.3	−10.0
Conservative	H. Woodhead	1,087	23.5	+6.0
Liberal Democrats	Pam Davies	657	14.2	+14.2
Majority		1,800	38.9	−16.0
Turnout		4,631		
Labour hold		Swing	-8.0	

Bramley
Party	Candidate	Votes	%	±%
Labour	A. Miller	3,628	61.2	−4.7
Liberal	Michael Meadowcroft	1,299	21.9	−2.9
Conservative	T. Cooper	765	12.9	+3.6
Liberal Democrats	M. Ewens	238	4.0	+4.0
Majority		2,329	39.3	−1.8
Turnout		5,930		
Labour hold		Swing	-0.9	

Burmantofts
Party	Candidate	Votes	%	±%
Labour	Ron Blower	3,103	57.3	−6.4
Liberal Democrats	T. Ineson	2,005	37.0	+6.7
Conservative	C. Wilson	305	5.6	−0.3
Majority		1,098	20.3	−13.1
Turnout		5,413		
Labour gain from Liberal Democrats		Swing	-6.5	

Chapel Allerton
Party	Candidate	Votes	%	±%
Labour	Norma Hutchinson	3,732	62.3	−10.4
Conservative	F. Yarnold	1,239	20.7	+2.2
Liberal Democrats	J. Levy	672	11.2	+2.4
Green	R. Mills	350	5.8	+5.8
Majority		2,493	41.6	−12.6
Turnout		5,993		
Labour hold		Swing	-6.3	

City & Holbeck
Party	Candidate	Votes	%	±%
Labour	John Erskine	3,413	69.4	−9.7
Liberal Democrats	R. Mayne	734	14.9	+3.5
Conservative	D. Boynton	532	10.8	+1.4
Green	D. Blakemore	240	4.9	+4.9
Majority		2,679	54.5	−13.2
Turnout		4,919		
Labour hold		Swing	-6.6	

Cookridge
Party	Candidate	Votes	%	±%
Conservative	A. Wheatley	3,905	52.9	+4.1
Labour	Alan Procter	1,951	26.5	−9.6
Liberal Democrats	John Macarthur	1519	20.6	+5.5
Majority		1,954	26.5	+13.8
Turnout		7,375		
Conservative hold		Swing	+6.8	

Garforth & Swillington
Party	Candidate	Votes	%	±%
Labour	Shirley Haines	4,747	56.7	−10.4
Conservative	J. Scott	2,464	29.4	+6.5
Liberal Democrats	R. Hutchinson	1,156	13.8	+3.9
Majority		2,283	27.3	−16.9
Turnout		8,367		
Labour hold		Swing	-8.4	

Halton
Party	Candidate	Votes	%	±%
Conservative	William Hyde	3,692	46.9	+5.2
Labour	N. Clarkson	3,003	38.1	−6.7
Liberal Democrats	David Hollingsworth	1,182	15.0	+1.6
Majority		689	8.7	+5.5
Turnout		7,877		
Conservative hold		Swing	+5.9	

Harehills
Party	Candidate	Votes	%	±%
Labour	J. Clare	3,571	67.3	+2.6
Conservative	A. Wilson	672	12.7	+0.9
Liberal Democrats	A. Appleyard	549	10.3	+10.3
Green	Andrew Tear	305	5.7	+5.7
Independent	D. Talbot	208	3.9	+1.0
Majority		2,899	54.6	+3.0
Turnout		5,305		
Labour hold		Swing	+0.8	

Headingley
Party	Candidate	Votes	%	±%
Labour	Keith Nathan	3,243	50.1	−5.0
Liberal Democrats	Christina Shaw	2,044	31.6	+14.2
Conservative	B. King	1,180	18.2	+3.5
Majority		1,199	18.5	−19.3
Turnout		6,467		
Labour hold		Swing	-9.6	

Horsforth
Party	Candidate	Votes	%	±%
Liberal Democrats	J. Meade	3,353	42.0	−0.4
Liberal Democrats	Christopher Townsley	3,249		
Conservative	M. Addison	3,180	39.9	+5.6
Conservative	E. Robinson	2,505		
Labour	C. Hooson	1,445	18.1	−5.3
Labour	A. Walker	1,240		
Majority		69	2.2	−6.0
Turnout		7,978		
Liberal Democrats hold		Swing		
Liberal Democrats hold		Swing	-3.0	

Hunslet
Party	Candidate	Votes	%	±%
Labour	I. Hugill	3,256	84.4	−6.5
Conservative	A. Larvin	600	15.6	+6.5
Majority		2,656	68.9	−13.1
Turnout		3,856		
Labour hold		Swing	-6.5	

Kirkstall
Party	Candidate	Votes	%	±%
Labour	John Illingworth	3,488	59.8	−22.0
Conservative	S. McBarron	1,049	18.0	−0.3
Liberal	N. Nowosielski	699	12.0	+12.0
Green	A. Mander	601	10.3	+10.3
Majority		2,439	41.8	−21.7
Turnout		5,837		
Labour hold		Swing	-10.8	

Middleton
Party	Candidate	Votes	%	±%
Labour	J. Taylor	3,273	72.0	−13.5
Conservative	C. Walker	730	16.1	+1.6
Liberal Democrats	C. Ward	541	11.9	+11.9
Majority		2,543	56.0	−15.1
Turnout		4,544		
Labour hold		Swing	-7.5	

Moortown
Party	Candidate	Votes	%	±%
Liberal Democrats	Miles Crompton	3,897	50.2	+5.4
Conservative	C. Thompson	2,195	28.3	−0.9
Labour	A. Hollas	1,666	21.5	−4.5
Majority		1,702	21.9	+6.2
Turnout		7,758		
Liberal Democrats hold		Swing	+3.1	

Morley North
Party	Candidate	Votes	%	±%
Labour	G. Morrison	3,539	48.1	−17.9
Conservative	A. Bloom	2,919	39.7	+5.8
Liberal Democrats	C. Hardcastle	892	12.1	+12.1
Majority		620	8.4	−23.7
Turnout		7,350		
Labour gain from Conservative		Swing	-11.8	

Morley South
Party	Candidate	Votes	%	±%
Labour	R. Mitchell	3,827	54.4	−13.5
Conservative	J. Galek	1,842	26.2	+4.6
Liberal Democrats	Thomas Leadley	1,370	19.5	+10.2
Majority		1,985	28.2	−18.2
Turnout		7,039		
Labour hold		Swing	-9.0	

North
Party	Candidate	Votes	%	±%
Conservative	Ronald Feldman	3,874	54.7	+4.8
Liberal Democrats	W. Forshaw	1,823	25.8	+11.1
Labour	B. Brady	1,379	19.5	−12.5
Majority		2,051	29.0	+11.1
Turnout		7,076		
Conservative hold		Swing	-3.1	

Otley & Wharfedale
Party	Candidate	Votes	%	±%
Liberal Democrats	Graham Kirkland	4,329	43.8	+7.9
Conservative	Graham Latty	3,473	35.1	+0.4
Labour	Susan Egan	2,083	21.1	−8.3
Majority		1,390	14.1	+12.9
Turnout		9,885		
Liberal Democrats hold		Swing	+3.7	

Pudsey North
Party	Candidate	Votes	%	±%
Conservative	I. Favell	3,733	43.5	+8.8
Labour	S. Pollard	2,767	32.3	−13.1
Liberal Democrats	J. Heppell	1,721	20.1	+0.1
Green	R. Notley	354	4.1	+4.1
Majority		966	11.3	+0.7
Turnout		8,575		
Conservative hold		Swing	+10.9	

Pudsey South
Party	Candidate	Votes	%	±%
Labour	A. Hickinson	3,314	46.7	−9.7
Conservative	R. Cam	1,983	27.9	+2.3
Liberal Democrats	A. Fleet	1,802	25.4	+7.4
Majority		1,331	18.7	−12.1
Turnout		7,099		
Labour hold		Swing	-6.0	

Richmond Hill
Party	Candidate	Votes	%	±%
Labour	M. Simmons	3,814	74.1	−6.0
Liberal Democrats	Keith Norman	795	15.4	+3.2
Conservative	W. Birch	541	10.5	+2.9
Majority		3,019	58.6	−9.2
Turnout		5,150		
Labour hold		Swing	-4.6	

Rothwell
Party	Candidate	Votes	%	±%
Labour	Brian Walker	3,587	55.6	−7.6
Liberal Democrats	A. Barber	1,453	22.5	+5.3
Conservative	A. Heeson	1,417	21.9	+2.3
Majority		2,134	33.0	−10.5
Turnout		6,457		
Labour hold		Swing	-6.4	

Roundhay
Party	Candidate	Votes	%	±%
Conservative	Peter Gruen	3,767	49.9	+3.1
Labour	Thomas Murray	2,075	27.5	−7.3
Liberal Democrats	J. Pullan	1,392	18.4	+7.9
Green	P. Ellis	313	4.1	−3.7
Majority		1,692	22.4	+10.4
Turnout		7,547		
Conservative hold		Swing	+5.2	

Seacroft
Party	Candidate	Votes	%	±%
Labour	D. Gabb	3,790	76.1	−6.3
Conservative	M. Collinson	665	13.3	+3.1
Liberal Democrats	Sadie Fisher	527	10.6	+3.2
Majority		3,125	62.7	−9.4
Turnout		4,982		
Labour hold		Swing	-4.7	

University
Party	Candidate	Votes	%	±%
Labour	N. Sloane	3,107	65.5	−7.3
Conservative	Robert Winfield	614	12.9	+2.6
Liberal Democrats	A. Norman	549	11.6	+4.0
Green	C. Lindsey	473	10.0	+0.8
Majority		2,493	52.6	−9.9
Turnout		4,743		
Labour hold		Swing	-4.9	

Weetwood
Party	Candidate	Votes	%	±%
Conservative	S. Gill	2,854	37.8	+3.2
Labour	J. Eveleigh	2,643	35.0	−6.0
Liberal Democrats	J. Ewens	2,055	27.2	+8.6
Majority		211	2.8	−3.6
Turnout		7,552		
Conservative hold		Swing	+4.6	

Wetherby
Party	Candidate	Votes	%	±%
Conservative	David Hudson	5,401	58.7	−1.7
Liberal Democrats	A. Beck	1,828	19.9	+6.9
Labour	S. Molloy	1,640	17.8	−8.9
Green	D. Corry	338	3.7	+3.7
Majority		3,573	38.8	+5.2
Turnout		9,207		
Conservative hold		Swing	-4.3	

Whinmoor
Party	Candidate	Votes	%	±%
Labour	E. Pickard	3,319	55.9	−9.5
Conservative	C. Jones	1,802	30.3	+4.8
Liberal Democrats	G. Roberts	820	13.8	+4.7
Majority		1,517	25.5	−14.3
Turnout		5,941		
Labour hold		Swing	-7.1	

Wortley
Party	Candidate	Votes	%	±%
Labour	Fabian Hamilton	3,762	56.4	−11.1
Conservative	B. Nicol	1,341	20.1	+2.1
Liberal	P. Williams	642	9.6	+9.6
Liberal Democrats	W. Moss	587	8.8	−5.7
Green	David Blackburn	334	5.0	+5.0
Majority		2,421	36.3	−13.2
Turnout		6,666		
Labour hold		Swing	-6.6	
