= Listed buildings in West Yorkshire =

There are a number of listed buildings in West Yorkshire. The term "listed building", in the United Kingdom, refers to a building or structure designated as being of special architectural, historical, or cultural significance. Details of all the listed buildings are contained in the National Heritage List for England. They are categorised in three grades: Grade I consists of buildings of outstanding architectural or historical interest, Grade II* includes significant buildings of more than local interest and Grade II consists of buildings of special architectural or historical interest. Buildings in England are listed by the Secretary of State for Culture, Media and Sport on recommendations provided by English Heritage, which also determines the grading.

Some listed buildings are looked after by the National Trust or English Heritage while others are in private ownership or administered by trusts.

== Listed buildings by grade ==
- Grade I listed buildings in West Yorkshire
- Grade II* listed buildings in Bradford
- Grade II* listed buildings in Calderdale
- Grade II* listed buildings in Kirklees
- Grade II* listed buildings in Leeds
- Grade II* listed buildings in Wakefield

== Listed buildings by civil parish or unparished area ==
=== City of Bradford ===
- Listed buildings in Addingham
- Listed buildings in Baildon
- Listed buildings in Bingley
- Listed buildings in Bradford (Bolton and Undercliffe Ward)
- Listed buildings in Bradford (Bowling and Barkerend Ward)
- Listed buildings in Bradford (Bradford Moor Ward)
- Listed buildings in Bradford (City Ward)
- Listed buildings in Bradford (Eccleshill Ward)
- Listed buildings in Bradford (Great Horton Ward)
- Listed buildings in Bradford (Heaton Ward)
- Listed buildings in Bradford (Little Horton Ward)
- Listed buildings in Bradford (Manningham Ward)
- Listed buildings in Bradford (Royds Ward)
- Listed buildings in Bradford (Toller Ward)
- Listed buildings in Bradford (Tong Ward)
- Listed buildings in Bradford (Trident Parish)
- Listed buildings in Bradford (Wibsey Ward)
- Listed buildings in Burley in Wharfedale
- Listed buildings in Clayton, West Yorkshire
- Listed buildings in Cullingworth
- Listed buildings in Denholme
- Listed buildings in Harden, West Yorkshire
- Listed buildings in Haworth, Cross Roads and Stanbury
- Listed buildings in Idle and Thackley
- Listed buildings in Ilkley
- Listed buildings in Keighley
- Listed buildings in Menston
- Listed buildings in Oxenhope
- Listed buildings in Queensbury, West Yorkshire
- Listed buildings in Saltaire
- Listed buildings in Sandy Lane, West Yorkshire
- Listed buildings in Shipley, West Yorkshire
- Listed buildings in Silsden
- Listed buildings in Steeton with Eastburn
- Listed buildings in Thornton and Allerton, West Yorkshire
- Listed buildings in Wilsden
- Listed buildings in Windhill and Wrose
- Listed buildings in Wyke

=== Calderdale ===
- Listed buildings in Blackshaw
- Listed buildings in Brighouse
- Listed buildings in Elland
- Listed buildings in Erringden
- Listed buildings in Greetland and Stainland
- Listed buildings in Halifax, West Yorkshire
- Listed buildings in Hebden Royd
- Listed buildings in Heptonstall
- Listed buildings in Hipperholme and Lightcliffe
- Listed buildings in Illingworth, West Yorkshire and Mixenden
- Listed buildings in Luddendenfoot
- Listed buildings in Northowram
- Listed buildings in Ovenden
- Listed buildings in Rastrick
- Listed buildings in Ripponden
- Listed buildings in Ryburn
- Listed buildings in Shelf, West Yorkshire
- Listed buildings in Sowerby Bridge
- Listed buildings in Todmorden (inner area)
- Listed buildings in Todmorden (outer areas)
- Listed buildings in Wadsworth, West Yorkshire
- Listed buildings in Warley, West Yorkshire

=== Kirklees ===
- Listed buildings in Almondbury
- Listed buildings in Batley
- Listed buildings in Cleckheaton
- Listed buildings in Colne Valley (central area)
- Listed buildings in Colne Valley (eastern area)
- Listed buildings in Colne Valley (western area)
- Listed buildings in Crosland Moor and Netherton
- Listed buildings in Denby Dale
- Listed buildings in Dewsbury
- Listed buildings in Golcar
- Listed buildings in Heckmondwike
- Listed buildings in Holme Valley (central area)
- Listed buildings in Holme Valley (outer areas)
- Listed buildings in Huddersfield (Ashbrow Ward)
- Listed buildings in Huddersfield (Dalton Ward)
- Listed buildings in Huddersfield (Greenhead Ward)
- Listed buildings in Huddersfield (Lindley Ward)
- Listed buildings in Huddersfield (Newsome Ward - central area)
- Listed buildings in Huddersfield (Newsome Ward - outer areas)
- Listed buildings in Kirkburton
- Listed buildings in Liversedge and Gomersal
- Listed buildings in Meltham
- Listed buildings in Mirfield

=== City of Leeds ===
- Listed buildings in Aberford and Lotherton
- Listed buildings in Alwoodley
- Listed buildings in Arthington
- Listed buildings in Bardsey cum Rigton
- Listed buildings in Barwick in Elmet and Scholes
- Listed buildings in Boston Spa
- Listed buildings in Bramham cum Oglethorpe
- Listed buildings in Bramhope
- Listed buildings in Calverley and Farsley
- Listed buildings in Carlton, Wharfedale
- Listed buildings in Clifford, West Yorkshire
- Listed buildings in Collingham, West Yorkshire
- Listed buildings in Drighlington
- Listed buildings in East Keswick
- Listed buildings in Garforth and Swillington
- Listed buildings in Gildersome
- Listed buildings in Great and Little Preston
- Listed buildings in Guiseley and Rawdon
- Listed buildings in Harewood, West Yorkshire
- Listed buildings in Horsforth
- Listed buildings in Kippax, West Yorkshire
- Listed buildings in Ledsham, West Yorkshire
- Listed buildings in Ledston
- Listed buildings in Leeds
- Listed buildings in Leeds (Adel and Wharfedale Ward)
- Listed buildings in Leeds (Ardsley and Robin Hood Ward)
- Listed buildings in Leeds (Armley Ward)
- Listed buildings in Leeds (Beeston and Holbeck Ward)
- Listed buildings in Leeds (Bramley and Stanningley Ward)
- Listed buildings in Leeds (Burmantofts and Richmond Hill Ward)
- Listed buildings in Leeds (Chapel Allerton Ward)
- Listed buildings in Leeds (City and Hunslet Ward - northern area)
- Listed buildings in Leeds (City and Hunslet Ward - southern area)
- Listed buildings in Leeds (Cross Gates and Whinmoor Ward)
- Listed buildings in Leeds (Farnley and Wortley Ward)
- Listed buildings in Leeds (Gipton and Harehills Ward)
- Listed buildings in Leeds (Headingley Ward)
- Listed buildings in Leeds (Hyde Park and Woodhouse)
- Listed buildings in Leeds (Kirkstall Ward)
- Listed buildings in Leeds (Middleton Park Ward)
- Listed buildings in Leeds (Moortown Ward)
- Listed buildings in Leeds (Roundhay Ward)
- Listed buildings in Leeds (Temple Newsam Ward)
- Listed buildings in Leeds (Weetwood Ward)
- Listed buildings in Methley
- Listed buildings in Micklefield
- Listed buildings in Morley, West Yorkshire
- Listed buildings in Otley
- Listed buildings in Parlington
- Listed buildings in Pool-in-Wharfedale
- Listed buildings in Pudsey
- Listed buildings in Rothwell, West Yorkshire
- Listed buildings in Seacroft and Killingbeck
- Listed buildings in Scarcroft
- Listed buildings in Shadwell, West Yorkshire
- Listed buildings in Sturton Grange
- Listed buildings in Thorner and Wothersome
- Listed buildings in Thorp Arch
- Listed buildings in Walton, Leeds
- Listed buildings in Wetherby

=== City of Wakefield ===
- Listed buildings in Ackworth, West Yorkshire
- Listed buildings in Badsworth
- Listed buildings in Castleford
- Listed buildings in Chevet, West Yorkshire
- Listed buildings in Crigglestone
- Listed buildings in Crofton, West Yorkshire
- Listed buildings in Darrington, West Yorkshire
- Listed buildings in East Hardwick
- Listed buildings in Featherstone
- Listed buildings in Hemsworth
- Listed buildings in Hessle and Hill Top
- Listed buildings in Horbury and South Ossett
- Listed buildings in Huntwick with Foulby and Nostell
- Listed buildings in Knottingley and Ferrybridge
- Listed buildings in Normanton, West Yorkshire
- Listed buildings in North Elmsall
- Listed buildings in Notton
- Listed buildings in Ossett
- Listed buildings in Pontefract
- Listed buildings in Ryhill
- Listed buildings in Sharlston
- Listed buildings in Sitlington
- Listed buildings in South Elmsall
- Listed buildings in South Hiendley
- Listed buildings in South Kirkby and Moorthorpe
- Listed buildings in Stanley and Outwood East
- Listed buildings in Thorpe Audlin
- Listed buildings in Upton, West Yorkshire
- Listed buildings in Wakefield
- Listed buildings in Walton, Wakefield
- Listed buildings in Warmfield cum Heath
- Listed buildings in West Bretton
- Listed buildings in Woolley, West Yorkshire
- Listed buildings in Wrenthorpe and Outwood West
