= Sandy Lane, West Yorkshire =

Village and civil parish in West Yorkshire, England

Coordinates: 53.81°N 1.84°W

Sandy Lane
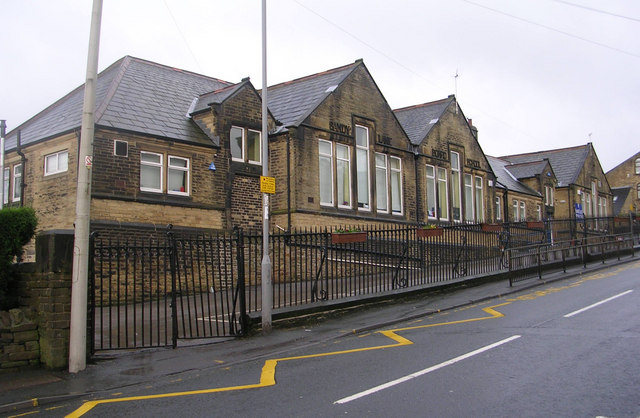
- Sandy Lane Primary School

- Location within West Yorkshire
- Population: 2,646 (2011)
- OS grid reference: SE1035
- Civil parish: Sandy Lane
- Metropolitan borough: City of Bradford
- Metropolitan county: West Yorkshire
- Region: Yorkshire and the Humber
- Country: England
- Sovereign state: United Kingdom
- Post town: Bradford
- Postcode district: BD15
- Dialling code: 01274
- Police: West Yorkshire
- Fire: West Yorkshire
- Ambulance: Yorkshire

Sandy Lane is a village and civil parish to the north of Bradford, West Yorkshire, England. The population of the civil parish as of the 2011 census was 2,646.

It is situated between Wilsden, Allerton and Nab Wood.

== History ==
Sandy Lane has been a small village since it was founded until the 1990s when a series of new developments were built to accommodate the burgeoning Bradford population. However residents in the village were upset with the plans and formed their own opposition group and subsequently voted for a parish council in 2003.

It is a traditional English village including a primary school, church, pub and park.

== Sport ==
Sandy Lane has a football and a cricket team.

The football team has played in a variety of nearby places including Bingley and Keighley. Their current ground is at Marley Stadium, Keighley. The team currently plays in West Yorkshire League Division One. There are also junior teams with children from five to 16 years old. The football team colours are red and blue stripes.

The cricket side currently play in Greenwood Park within the village.

== See also ==
- Listed buildings in Sandy Lane, West Yorkshire
