= Carlton, Wharfedale =

Civil parish in West Yorkshire, England

Coordinates: 53.884°N 1.668°W

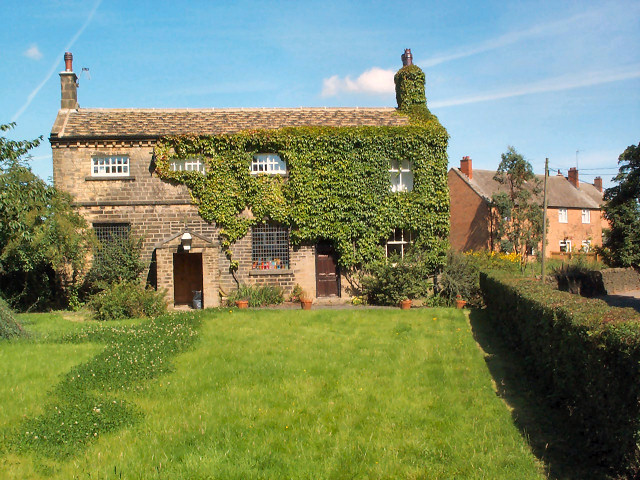
Former church in East Carlton

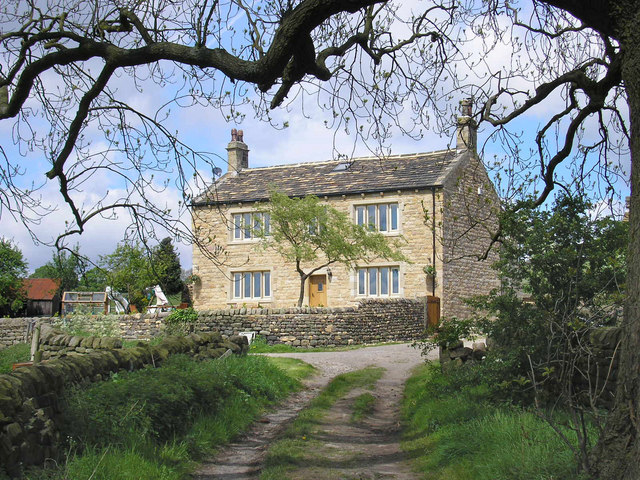
Farmhouse in West Carlton

Carlton is a civil parish in the City of Leeds in West Yorkshire, England. It consists of the villages of East Carlton and West Carlton, and in 2001 had a population of 169.

== Location ==
Carlton is located immediately to the north of Leeds Bradford Airport. It borders Guiseley in the west, Otley, Pool-in-Wharfedale, and Bramhope in the north, and Cookridge in the east. The Leeds Bradford Airport Industrial Estate is in the southern part of the parish, on the eastern side of the A658 road which traverses the parish roughly from south-west to north-east.

Carlton Moor lies north of East and West Carlton.

== Etymology ==
The name Carlton is first attested in the Domesday Book as Carleton, Carletun and Carletune. The name comes from the Old Norse word karla (genitive plural of karl 'commoner, churl') and the Old English word tūn ('estate'). Thus it once meant 'estate owned by commoners'. The Old Norse form karla may be based on an earlier Old English name *ceorla tūn, of the same meaning.

== See also ==
- Listed buildings in Carlton, Wharfedale
