= Listed buildings in Shipley, West Yorkshire =

Shipley is a ward in the metropolitan borough of the City of Bradford, West Yorkshire, England. Excluding the listed buildings in the model village of Saltaire, which are the subject of a separate list, it contains 14 listed buildings that are recorded in the National Heritage List for England. Of these, one is at Grade II*, the middle of the three grades, and the others are at Grade II, the lowest grade. The listed buildings consist of a farmhouse and a barn, houses, churches and associated structures, a canal bridge and a warehouse, mill buildings, including a chimney, and a war memorial.

== Key ==
Grade	Criteria
II*	Particularly important buildings of more than special interest
II	Buildings of national importance and special interest

== Buildings ==
Name and location	Photograph	Date	Notes	Grade
Barn, New Close Farm; 53.82867°N 1.81385°W	—	17th century (probable)	The barn is timber framed, later encased in stone, and has a stone slate roof. It has double aisles, seven bays, a small extension to the rear and a larger extension at the left end. The barn contains a central square-headed cart entry and a doorway.	II*
New Close Farmhouse; 53.82850°N 1.81402°W	—	Mid to late 17th century	The farmhouse is rendered, and has a stone slate roof with chamfered gable copings on moulded kneelers. There are two storeys, three bays, and extensions at each end. On the front is a porch, and the windows are mullioned, with some mullions removed. Over the ground floor openings is a continuous hood mould.	II
Shipley Conservative Club; 53.83382°N 1.77538°W		Late 17th century	A house, later used for other purposes, the oldest part is the left wing, the rest dating from about 1700. It is in stone with rusticated quoins, and stone slate roofs with coped gables and moulded kneelers. There are two storeys and a U-shaped plan, consisting of a central hall range and projecting gabled wings. The hall range has three bays, the central doorway, now blocked, with an architrave and a cornice, and the windows are cross windows. In the left wing are mullioned windows with the mullions removed, under a continuous hood mould in the upper floor. The right wing contains sash windows, in the gable is an oculus, and at the rear of the central range is a round-arched stair window.	II
Canal Bridge No. 208; 53.83620°N 1.76897°W		c. 1774	The bridge carries a footpath over the Leeds and Liverpool Canal. It is in stone, and consists of a single shallow segmental arch. The bridge is hump-backed, and has voussoirs and a parapet with round copings. The walkway is partly paved with setts, and is partly concreted, and the towpath passes under its north side.	II
5, 6 and 7 Jane Hills; 53.83746°N 1.78168°W		1796	A row of three stone houses with quoins, bracketed gutters, and a stone slate roof with coped gables and kneelers. There are two storeys and each house has one bay. There is one inserted doorway, the other doorways have plain surrounds, and above the middle door is a dated and initialled tablet. The windows are mullioned with three lights and six-pane casements. In the left gable end is a blocked taking-in door.	II
St Paul's Church; 53.83396°N 1.78281°W		1823–26	A Commissioners' church designed by John Oates in Perpendicular style, it is in stone with a Welsh slate roof. The church consists of a nave, north and south aisles, a chancel, and a west tower. The tower has three stages, a west doorway, a three-light west window, clock faces, a pierced embattled parapet with tall crocketed pinnacles, and flanking porches. The parapets on the body of the church are also embattled. At the east end of the chancel are octagonal corner towers, the east window is transomed and has 14 lights, and above it is a carved plaque.	II
Gates and gate piers, St Paul's Church; 53.83365°N 1.78272°W		c. 1823	The stone gate piers are square, with lancet panels and pyramidal caps, each surmounted by a stone statuette of a prophet. The double gates are in iron.	II
Canal warehouse, Wharf Street; 53.83551°N 1.77667°W		Mid 19th century	The warehouse is in stone with quoins and a Welsh slate roof. There are two storeys on the front, three at the rear, and four bays. On the Wharf Street front are segmental-headed loading doors with quoined jambs and a hoist. The canal front has a projecting bay on piers over the canal, on this front are loading doors and windows, and in the gable end is an oculus.	II
Manor Lane Wesleyan Reformed Church; 53.83356°N 1.77863°W		1863	The church and former caretaker's house are in stone with hipped Welsh slate roofs. The church is on a plinth, and has a symmetrical front of three bays, the middle bay projecting under an open pediment, and a moulded eaves cornice. Steps lead up to a central doorway with Doric columns and pilasters, a Doric entablature and a blocking course, over which is an oculus with a scrolled support and a cornice. In the outer bays are round-arched windows with sills on consoles and archivolts. The six bays along the sides contain round-arched windows above flat-headed basement windows, and at the rear is the house, which contain sash windows.	II
Northwest block, Victoria Works; 53.83810°N 1.77902°W	—	c. 1873	The block of the textile mill is in stone with a band, square stone gutter brackets, and a stone slate roof with moulded gable copings. There are four storeys and 16 bays, the central bay wider and containing loading doors and a dormer with a hoist. The windows are industrial casements, there are some round-arched openings in the ground floor, and in the left gable end is a three-light window, the middle light round-arched.	II
South blocks, Victoria Works; 53.83753°N 1.77857°W		1873	The blocks of the textile mill are in stone with moulded cornices on square brackets, deep parapets, and Welsh slate roofs. The blocks each have five storeys, the left block has sides of 15 and six bays, and the right block has 23 and six bays. On the corners are round-arched turrets with pedimented tops. The right bay of the left block projects and contains loading doors. The loading doors in the right block are in a near-central bay, and in both blocks the windows are industrial casements. Between the blocks is a small gabled building.	II
Mill Chimney, Victoria Works; 53.83774°N 1.77917°W		1873	The chimney is in stone, octagonal and tapering. At the top is a cornice, on long shaped brackets, with rounded caps.	II
Westcliffe Road Chapel; 53.83108°N 1.78050°W		1875	The chapel and manse are in stone with Welsh slate roofs. The chapel has two storeys and a three-bay front with a pedimented gable. In the centre is a gabled porch that has a round-arched entrance and a keystone, flanked by square-headed windows with shallow pediments on shaped brackets. The upper floor windows are round-arched with archivolts and keystones on a sill band, the central windows paired. In the tympanum is an inscribed and dated medallion. Along the sides are five bays with square-headed windows in the ground floor and round-arched windows above. The pedimented sixth bay forms the three-storey manse that contains casement windows.	II
War Memorial; 53.83431°N 1.78094°W		1921	The war memorial is in Crowgill Park. It is in Creetown granite, and consists of a Latin cross with capped terminals and a sword in relief. The cross has a slender tapering shaft, with a moulded capital and base, and stands on an octagonal plinth on three steps. On the plinth are an inscription and the dates of the World Wars.	II

== See also ==
- Listed buildings in Saltaire
