= Saltaire United Reformed Church =

- The western frontage of the church

- Location within West Yorkshire
- 53°50′20″N 1°47′27″W
- Location: Saltaire, West Yorkshire
- OS grid reference: SE 138 381

History
- Built: 1858–1859

Site notes
- Architect(s): Lockwood and Mawson
- Architectural style: Italianate Classical

Listed Building – Grade I
- Designated: 22 November 1966
- Reference no.: 1314229

Saltaire United Reformed Church (originally Saltaire Congregational Church) is a church at Saltaire, West Yorkshire, England. Commissioned and paid for by Titus Salt in the mid 19th century, the church is a Grade I listed building and sits within the Saltaire World Heritage Site.

== History ==
When Titus Salt, a devoted member of the Congregational church, commenced the design and construction of his model village at Saltaire, a Congregational church was the first public building commissioned. Salt donated the land and paid for the cost of the church himself, a cost of £16,000 (equivalent to £1,719,004 in 2025).

The church was designed, as was the rest of Saltaire, by the Bradford-based architect partnership of Lockwood and Mawson in the Italianate Classical style. Local firms were used for the works. The firm of John Ives did the woodwork and carvings while Moulton Brothers undertook the masonry work.

Since 1972 the church has been known as Saltaire United Reformed Church following the merger of Congregational Church in England and Wales and the Presbyterian Church of England.

The ceiling of the church was badly damaged and partially collapsed due to being affected by Storm Dennis in February 2020. In April 2021 the architects employed by the church reported that a contract for repairs to the plasterwork would be awarded by the insurers while grant aid for other building works and improved security was being sought. Repairs took until the end of 2022 to complete.

== Description ==
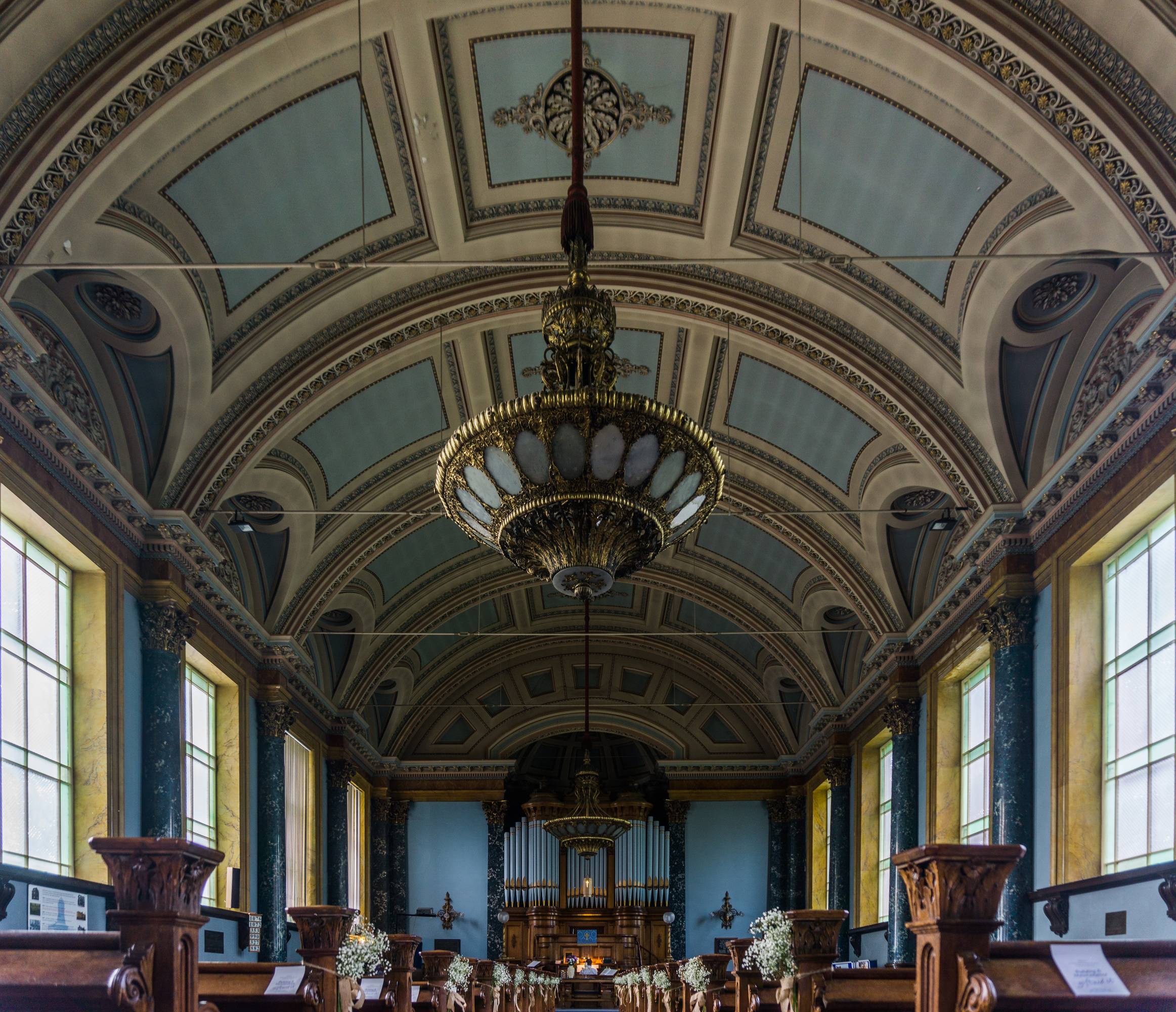
Interior view of the church (May 2018)

The foundation stone of the church was laid by Caroline Salt (wife of Titus) in 1856 and opened in 1859. Built from local stone with an ashlar finish. The nave has no aisle and on the western end has a semi-circular portico. The portico is topped by a round tower with a clock at each quarter and above that an octagonal array of columns with a dome. The main part of the church is roofed with Welsh slate and has large plain windows. The organ was an 1890 addition and was built by Huddersfield firm Conacher and Co and subsequently rebuilt twice. A pair of large chandeliers, originally gas lit, hang on the centre line of the nave ceiling. On the south side of the nave is the Salt family mausoleum where Sir Titus Salt was buried in 1877.

== See also ==
- Grade I listed buildings in West Yorkshire
- Listed buildings in Saltaire
