= Listed buildings in Sharlston =

Sharlston is a civil parish in the metropolitan borough of the City of Wakefield, West Yorkshire, England. The parish contains six listed buildings that are recorded in the National Heritage List for England. Of these, one is listed at Grade II*, the middle of the three grades, and the others are at Grade II, the lowest grade. The parish contains the village of Sharlston and the surrounding area. The most important building in the parish is Sharlston Hall, which is listed, together with associated structures, and the other listed building is a private house.

== Key ==
Grade	Criteria
II*	Particularly important buildings of more than special interest
II	Buildings of national importance and special interest

== Buildings ==
Name and location	Photograph	Date	Notes	Grade
Sharlston Hall; 53.66494°N 1.40295°W		c. 1475	A manor house that originated as a hall range, the west end was replaced by a cross-wing in about 1450, an east cross-wing was added in the late 15th century, and there have been further later additions. The hall has a timber framed core, it was later encased in stone and rendered. There are two storeys, and an attic in one wing. The south front has five unequal gables, one on a two-storey porch. The upper storey and the gable of the porch are jettied, and have exposed decorative timber framing, including a beam with an inscription and a date. In the front and rear of the hall range are large five-light mullioned and transomed windows, and there are two gabled dormers. Elsewhere, there are mullioned windows and casements.	II*
19 The Green; 53.66563°N 1.40690°W	—	17th century	A farmhouse, later a private house, it was extended in the 19th century, the older part being the rear wing. The house is in sandstone with some brick, and has roofs of Welsh slate and stone slate. There are two storeys and a T-shaped plan, with a front of two bays. The doorway has a plain surround, and some of the windows on the front are sliding sashes. In the rear wing are mullioned windows, some with hood moulds.	II
Dovecote, Sharlston Hall; 53.66419°N 1.40247°W		17th century (probable)	The dovecote is in sandstone with quoins, a continuous hood mould, and a pyramidal stone slate roof. There is a square plan, with a single storey and a single call. In the north front is a doorway with a plain surround, over which is a recessed panel flanked by vertical rectangular openings. Inside there are ties of nest holes.	II
Entrance gateway, Sharlston Hall; 53.66442°N 1.40357°W		17th century (probable)	Flanking the entrance to the drive are two pairs of sandstone piers, all with scrolled consoles. The inner pair are about 0.75 metres (2 ft 6 in) square and 4 metres (13 ft) high, and have moulded cornices, and prominent moulded caps with low moulded pyramidal pedestals and ball finials. The inner pair are about 0.5 metres (1 ft 8 in) square and 2.5 metres (8 ft 2 in) high, and have moulded caps and obelisk finials.	II
Forecourt wall and gate posts, Sharlston Hall; 53.66481°N 1.40284°W	—	17th century (probable)	Running along the forecourt of the hall is a sandstone with flat coping. In the centre is a gateway flanked by square gate posts with moulded caps and obelisk finials.	II
Gazebo and boundary wall, Sharlston Hall; 53.66479°N 1.40377°W	—	17th century (probable)	The wall encloses the garden on the south and west sides, and is in sandstone with shallow ridged coping. It is about 75 metres (246 ft) long on each side, and 2 metres (6 ft 7 in) high. In the centre of each side is a doorway, and the southwest corner is curved. In the northwest corner is a gazebo in brown brick with sandstone dressings and a pyramidal stone slate roof. There is a square plan and a single storey over a basement. Steps lead up to a doorway in the south side, and the east and west sides are open with pillars on the corners.	II
