= Listed buildings in Stanley and Outwood East =

Stanley and Outwood East is a former ward in the metropolitan borough of the City of Wakefield, West Yorkshire, England. The former ward contains twelve listed buildings that are recorded in the National Heritage List for England. Of these, one is listed at Grade II*, the middle of the three grades, and the others are at Grade II, the lowest grade. Most of the listed buildings are houses, cottages and associated structures. There are two listed buildings constructed by the Aire and Calder Navigation Company, and the other listed building is a milepost.

== Key ==
Grade	Criteria
II*	Particularly important buildings of more than special interest
II	Buildings of national importance and special interest

== Buildings ==
Name and location	Photograph	Date	Notes	Grade
Hatfeild Hall; 53.70665°N 1.48444°W		c. 1600	A large house, partly rendered, with quoins, sill bands, and a Welsh slate roof. There are two storeys and a symmetrical front of five bays, the middle three bays projecting slightly under a gable containing a shield. In the outer bays are two-storey canted bay windows. The ground floor openings, including the central doorway, have Gothic arches, and in the upper floor are windows with square heads and casements. In the right return are three gables, two with a quatrefoil in the apex.	II
420 Aberford Road; 53.71309°N 1.47077°W		17th century	A stone house, rendered on the front, it has a roof partly in stone slate and partly tiled, with coped gables and moulded kneelers. There are two storeys, a symmetrical front of three bays, and two gabled rear wings. The doorway has an ornamental lintel, and the windows are mullioned.	II
23 and 25 Finkin Lane; 53.70219°N 1.48398°W		17th century	A pair of cottages in painted stone, rendered at the rear, and with a pantile roof. There are two storeys and four bays. The doorway in the right cottage has a quoined surround, and an ogee-arched ornamental stone lintel, and the windows are replacement casements. The left cottage has a doorway with a plain surround, and the windows are horizontally-sliding sashes.	II
Barn north of Royds Hall; 53.72733°N 1.46198°W	—	17th century (probable)	The barn is timber framed, encased in red brick, and has a stone slate roof. There is a rectangular plan and five bays, and it contains square-headed wagon doors.	II
Clarke Hall; 53.69442°N 1.48347°W		c. 1680	The rear wing was added to the house in about 1700. The house is built in red brick on a plinth, with sandstone dressings, and quoins. There are two storeys, a symmetrical front of five bays, small side wings with canted corners, and a rear wing. The outer bays project and are gabled, and in the centre is a two-storey gabled porch with urn finials. The doorway has a flattened Tudor arch with a hollow chamfer, and the windows are mullioned and transomed with casements.	II*
Walls and mounting blocks, Clarke Hall; 53.69451°N 1.48370°W		17th or 18th century	The walls enclose the forecourt on the north side. The east part has red brick on the outside and stone inside, with flat coping. To the west it is taller, it is in stone, and contains a gateway with piers surmounted by urns, and wrought iron gates. The wall extends further to the west and there is another gateway. The forecourt is cobbled with a path flanked by mounting blocks.	II
Royds Hall; 53.72699°N 1.46177°W	—	Early 18th century	A farmhouse, later a private house, it is in red brick with sandstone dressings, chamfered quoins, a prominent hood mould, and a stone slate roof with coped gables. There are two storeys, cellars and attics, a double depth plan, and six bays. The doorway has a cornice and carved consoles, and the windows are rectangular with flat heads, with some windows blocked.	II
Gate piers and wall, Royds Hall; 53.72708°N 1.46213°W	—	Early 18th century	The wall encloses the garden on the north and west sides. It is in red brick and sandstone with flat stone coping. The two gate piers are square and rusticated, and each has a pulvinated frieze, scrolls, and a moulded cap.	II
12A, 14, 16, 18 and 20 Lake Yard and gate piers 53.71465°N 1.46617°W		1802	A row of cottages and workshops built by the Aire and Calder Navigation Company, and later converted into five dwellings. They are in stone with hipped roofs of slate and stone slate, and form a symmetrical row with two storeys. In the centre is a three-bay house flanked by six-bay cottages. Beyond these are recessed seven-bay workshops, and nine and seven bay cart sheds. Most of the windows are sashes, and some casements. In the former workshops are segmental-headed cart entries with a round-arched loading door above. Attached to the left cart shed is a pair of rusticated stone gate piers, each with a sunk panel containing a roundel, and a moulded cornice with guttae.	II
Stanley Hall; 53.69675°N 1.48295°W		1804–07	A large house, later used for other purposes, it is rendered, with a sill band, a moulded eaves cornice and blocking course, and a slate roof. There are two storeys, and a symmetrical entrance front of five bays. In the centre is a Tuscan portico with a pediment and a round-arched doorway, and the windows are sashes. The garden front is symmetrical with nine bays, the middle three bays forming a bow.	II
Aqueduct Cottage; 53.70210°N 1.46294°W		c. 1839	A cottage or office built by the Aire and Calder Navigation Company between the canal basin and the River Calder. It is in stone, with a small eaves cornice, and a Welsh slate roof, and is in Classical style. There is a single storey and three bays. In the centre is a tetrastyle Doric portico with square outer piers and inner fluted columns, supporting an architrave, a frieze and a triangular pediment. The doorway has an architrave, on the returns are pediments.	II
Milepost; 53.70488°N 1.47718°W		Mid to late 19th century	The milepost is on the southeast side of Aberford Road (A642 road). It is in stone with a cast iron overlay, a triangular plan and a rounded top. On the top is inscribed "WAKEFIELD & ABERFORD ROAD" and "STANLEY", and on the sides are the distances to Wakefield. Aberford, and Oulton.	II
