= Listed buildings in Carlton, Wharfedale =

Carlton, Wharfedale is a civil parish in the metropolitan borough of the City of Leeds, West Yorkshire, England. The parish contains three listed buildings that are recorded in the National Heritage List for England. All the listed buildings are designated at Grade II, the lowest of the three grades, which is applied to "buildings of national importance and special interest". The parish contains the small villages of East Carlton and West Carlton, and is otherwise rural. The listed buildings consist of a hall-house, a farmhouse, and a school later used as a church.

== Buildings ==
Name and location	Photograph	Date	Notes
Carlton Hall; 53.88510°N 1.66406°W	—	17th century	A hall-house in sandstone on a chamfered plinth that has a stone slate roof with coped gables, kneelers and finials. There are two storeys, and it consists of a central hall range flanked by gabled outer bays. The doorway has a moulded surround, a Tudor arch, and a fanlight with three square lights. The windows are mullioned or mullioned and transomed, some with hood moulds.
Grange Farm Cottage; 53.88260°N 1.68538°W	—	Late 17th century	A farmhouse in sandstone on a chamfered plinth with a stone slate roof. There are two storeys and a symmetrical front of two bays. In the centre is a modern porch and a doorway with a plain surround, over which is an inserted single-light window. The other windows are mullioned with four lights, and over the ground floor windows is a continuous hood mould.
Former St Bartholomew's Mission Church; 53.88480°N 1.66574°W		1818	Originally a school, and at one time used as a church, the building is in gritstone on a plinth, with a floor band, dentilled eaves, a stone slate roof with coped gables, and two storeys. To the left is a gabled porch flanked by large windows. To the right is a doorway with a fanlight, and further to the right a sash window. In the upper floor are four sash windows, three of them horizontally-sliding.
