= Listed buildings in Sandy Lane, West Yorkshire =

Sandy Lane is a civil parish in the metropolitan borough of the City of Bradford, West Yorkshire, England. It contains eight listed buildings that are recorded in the National Heritage List for England. All the listed buildings are designated at Grade II, the lowest of the three grades, which is applied to "buildings of national importance and special interest". The parish contains the village of Sandy Lane and the surrounding countryside. All the listed buildings are houses, cottages, farmhouses and farm buildings.

== Buildings ==
Name and location	Photograph	Date	Notes
Upper Swain Royd Farmhouse; 53.81577°N 1.84280°W	—	Late 18th century	The farm is in sandstone with quoins, and a stone slate roof with saddlestones and kneelers. There are two storeys and four bays. In the left bay is a gabled porch, the right bay contains a doorway with squared jambs, and the windows are mullioned with some lights blocked.
Bothy, Upper Swain Royd Farm; 53.81559°N 1.84276°W	—	Late 18th century	The building is in sandstone, and has a stone slate roof with kneelers at the gable ends. There are two storeys, the doorways have squared jambs, and the windows have either a single light, or two lights with a mullion.
Lower Swain Royd Farmhouse and barn 53.81408°N 1.83661°W		c. 1800	The farmhouse and barn are in sandstone, with a stone slate roof, and two storeys. The farmhouse has a gabled porch and a doorway with squared jambs, and in each floor are two four-light mullioned windows. The barn has an outshut on the front, and it contains a doorway with a large flat lintel.
Cliffe View; 53.80818°N 1.83445°W	—	c. 1820	A row of cottages in sandstone, with stone slate roofs, and two storeys. The doorways have squared jambs, and the windows have either a single light, or three lights with mullions; some mullions have been removed.
31–38 Prune Park Road; 53.80829°N 1.83348°W	—	c. 1820–30	A group of cottages in two ranges at right angles forming an L-shaped plan. They are in sandstone with stone slate roofs, and have two storeys. The doorways have squared jambs, and the windows have either a single light, or two lights with a mullion.
Barn and stable block, Gazeby Hall; 53.81310°N 1.84837°W	—	1828	The combined barn, stable and coach house are in sandstone, with bracketed eaves, and a stone slate roof. There are two storeys, and the central bay projects under a pediment. The openings in the ground floor have segmental arches, and there is a segmental-arched portal with voussoirs, a dated keystone, and panelled impost blocks. In the upper floor are lunettes, and the gable ends contain circular keyed openings.
111–127 Cottingley Road; 53.81666°N 1.83240°W	—	c. 1830	A row of cottages stepped down a hill, they are in sandstone with stone slate roofs. The cottages have two storeys, and one or two bays. The doorways have squared jambs, and the windows have either a single light, or two lights with a mullion.
41 Cottingley Road; 53.81498°N 1.83309°W	—	c. 1840	A stone house with a sill band, bracketed eaves, and a stone slate roof. There are two storeys and three bays. The doorway has a cornice on consoles, and the windows have either a single light, or two lights with a mullion.
