= Listed buildings in Methley =

Methley is a village in the ward of Kippax and Methley in the metropolitan borough of the City of Leeds, West Yorkshire, England. The village and surrounding area contain twelve listed buildings that are recorded in the National Heritage List for England. Of these, one is listed at Grade I, the highest of the three grades, and the others are at Grade II, the lowest grade. Most of the listed buildings are houses and associated structures, and the others include a church and memorials in the churchyard, a railway bridge, and a former school.

== Key ==
Grade	Criteria
I	Buildings of exceptional interest, sometimes considered to be internationally important
II	Buildings of national importance and special interest

== Buildings ==
Name and location	Photograph	Date	Notes	Grade
St Oswald's Church, Methley; 53.73455°N 1.40862°W		13th century	The oldest part of the church is in the north wall of the nave, and since then the church has been altered and extended, with restorations and rebuilding in 1874 and in 1900–01. It is built in sandstone, and consists of a nave with a clerestory, a south aisle, a south porch, a chancel with a south chapel and a north vestry, and a west tower. The tower, which is in Perpendicular style, has three stages, diagonal buttresses, two-light bell windows, clock faces, and a corbelled embattled parapet with crocketed corner pinnacles. Most of the windows in the body of the church have Perpendicular tracery, including the east window, which has five lights.	I
Old Pinder Green School; 53.73064°N 1.40379°W		1637	A house, later extended and divided, it is in sandstone with quoins and a stone slate roof. There are two storeys, an L-shaped plan, a front of three bays, and a rear wing. The doorway has an initialled and dated lintel, to the left are mullioned windows, and to the right are cross windows.	II
The Old Rectory and wall 53.74113°N 1.39467°W	—	c. 1700	The rectory, later a private house, is in brick on a plinth, with a moulded string course and a hipped two-span stone slate roof. There are two storeys and a cellar, a double-depth plan, and a symmetrical front of five bays, the middle bay projecting slightly. Steps flanked by a curving coped balustrade lead up to a central doorway. The windows on the front are sashes, at the rear is a sliding sash and a staircase window, and in the east gable is a mullioned window. The boundary of the garden is enclosed by a stone wall.	II
Stable block north of Hazel House; 53.72960°N 1.40805°W	—	18th century (probable)	The stable block, which has been converted for other uses, is in sandstone with quoins and a tile roof. There are two low storeys and a rectangular plan. The building contains doorways and windows, some of the latter with mullions.	II
Two chest tombs and three gravestones, St Oswald's Church, Methley; 53.73439°N 1.40877°W	—	1668	The memorials in the churchyard are arranged in an irregular line, and are dated between 1668 and 1767. They are in stone and have differing decoration, some with inscriptions that are illegible.	II
Church Side Farmhouse; 53.73491°N 1.41005°W		Late 17th century	A farmhouse, later a private house, it is in sandstone, with quoins, and a stone slate roof with coped gables and kneelers. There are two storeys and attics, a double-depth plan, and a front of three bays. The central doorway has a square head and a chamfered surround. Above the doorway is an inserted sash window, and the other windows are mullioned. In the attic are two large gabled dormers with three-light mullioned windows.	II
Tomb chest and gravestone, St Oswald's Church, Methley; 53.73442°N 1.40842°W	—	1714	The older of these is the gravestone, which has a ropework border, a scrolled foot, and a largely illegible inscription. The tomb chest is dated 1767, it has a bevelled edge, and is otherwise undecorated.	II
Shann House and Cottage; 53.74067°N 1.41253°W	—	Early 18th century	A house, later divided, that has an earlier timber framed core, the front is in rendered brick, with a band, the rear in sandstone, and the roof is tiled. There are two storeys and a T-shaped plan, with a front range of seven bays and a rear wing. In the centre is a doorway, and the windows are casements.	II
Dunford House; 53.73028°N 1.38234°W		Early to mid 18th century	A farmhouse, later a private house, it is in brick with stone dressings, a modillion cornice, and a stone slate roof with coped gables and kneelers. There are three storeys, a double-depth plan, and a symmetrical front of five bays. In the centre is a doorway with an architrave, pilaster jambs, a triglyph frieze, and a moulded cornice. Above it is a panel and a Venetian window with a Gibbs-style head, and Tuscan architraves to the ogee-headed side lights. Above this is a Diocletian window, and the other windows are sashes with keystones. At the rear is a round-arched stair window.	II
Dovecote, Dunford House; 53.73060°N 1.38262°W	—	Late 18th century	The dovecote is in brown brick with a saw-toothed eaves band and a pyramidal stone slate roof. There is a square plan, a single cell, and three storeys. The openings are doorways and windows, some with segmental heads.	II
Harrison's Bridge; 53.73525°N 1.40608°W	—	1835–40	The bridge carries a railway over a track. It was built by the North Midland Railway, the lower courses are in stone, rusticated on the facings, and the upper parts are in orange-red brick. The bridge consists of a single segmental arch with jambs and voussoirs, and on each side are splayed coped abutments. At the top is a concrete plinth and a parapet with railings.	II
Club House; 53.73364°N 1.40672°W		1847	A school and master's house, later used for other purposes, it is in sandstone with a stone slate roof, and is in Gothic style. There is an H-shaped plan, with a main range and cross-wings, the right cross-wing being the master's house with two storeys, and the rest with one storey. The main range has three bays with a lean-to in the centre. In the right angle is a buttressed porch with a moulded arched doorway and an ogival gable surmounted by a crocket. Most of the windows are mullioned.	II
