= Listed buildings in Steeton with Eastburn =

Steeton with Eastburn is a civil parish in the metropolitan borough of the City of Bradford, West Yorkshire, England. It contains 25 listed buildings that are recorded in the National Heritage List for England. All the listed buildings are designated at Grade II, the lowest of the three grades, which is applied to "buildings of national importance and special interest". The parish contains the villages of Steeton and Eastburn and the surrounding area. Most of the listed buildings are houses, cottages and associated structures, farmhouses and farm buildings. The other listed buildings include a church, a Sunday school, a road bridge, a former textile mill, three milestones, a commemorative tower, and a pillbox and two fire posts surviving from the Second World War.

== Buildings ==
| Name and location | Photograph | Date | Notes |
|---|---|---|---|
| 14, 16, 18 and 20 High Street, Steeton; 53.89475°N 1.95054°W | — | Mid 17th century | A house that was refronted in 1710 and divided into four in the 19th century. It is in stone, rendered and pebbledashed, and has a stone slate roof with a coped gable and kneelers on the left. There are two storeys, three bays, and a single-storey outshut on the left. The central doorway has a chamfered surround and composite jambs, and the other doorways have monolithic jambs. The windows on the front date from the 18th century, and at the rear are 17th-century mullioned windows, with some mullions missing, and with a continuous hood mould over the ground floor windows. The chimneys are decorated with blind arcading. |
| The High Hall; 53.89747°N 1.94994°W | | 1674 | A large house that was extended and altered in 1921, it is in stone with a stone slate roof and two storeys. The entrance front is symmetrical with five bays, and it contains a two-storey porch with a coped gable and kneelers. The porch contains an arched doorway, with a shield, a three-light stepped window, and a recess for a bell above, and in the other bays are cross windows. Attached to the rear is a long range with mullioned windows and a canted bay window. At its rear are two semicircular-arched doorways and a five-light stair window with transoms. |
| 44 and 46 School Street, Steeton; 53.89440°N 1.94911°W | | 1710 | A house, later divided, it is in stone with quoins, a moulded belt course, and a stone slate roof with coped gables and kneelers. There are two storeys and a double-depth plan. The original doorway has an architrave, a pulvinated frieze and a cornice, above it is a decorative oval date plaque in a rectangular niche, and to the left is an inserted doorway with monolithic jambs. The windows have architraves and projecting sills, and the chimneys are decorated with blind arcading. |
| The Hob Hill; 53.89461°N 1.95319°W | — | 1720 | The house, which was later altered and refronted, is in stone, rendered at the front, on a plinth, with quoins, an eaves band, a moulded stone gutter, and a stone slate roof. There are two storeys and a front of seven bays. On the front is a doorway with an architrave, an entablature, and a cornice. At the rear are four bays, and a doorway with monolithic jambs and a dated lintel. Most of the windows are sashes, there is one mullioned window, and an arched stair window. |
| Steeton Hall Farm; 53.89713°N 1.94935°W | | Early 18th century | The farmhouse is in stone, the gable ends are rendered, and it has quoins, a stone slate roof, and two storeys. The central doorway has monolithic jambs, and the windows are mullioned. |
| Barn northeast of The High Hall; 53.89758°N 1.94953°W | — | Early 18th century | The barn was extended to the left later in the 18th century. It is in stone, with quoins, and a stone slate roof with coped gables, kneelers and spiked finials. There are two storeys and five bays. The original three bays are symmetrical, the middle bay projecting under a gable with a ball finial. This contains a cart entry with a shouldered lintel, above it is a three-light mullioned window, and it is flanked by doorways with chamfered surrounds and composite jambs. Elsewhere, the windows have two lights, and the extension contains a doorway with monolithic jambs. |
| Eastburn House; 53.89701°N 1.96950°W | — | Mid 18th century | A stone house with quoins, and a stone slate roof with coped gables. There are two storeys, a double-depth plan, and three bays. The central doorway has monolithic jambs, a rectangular fanlight, and a triangular pediment. The windows are mullioned; in the left bay they have four lights and the right bay they have five. At the rear is a semicircular-arched stair window with impost blocks, a keystone, and Gothic glazing. |
| Barn northeast of Eastburn House; 53.89722°N 1.96923°W | — | 1773 | A stone barn with quoins, and a stone slate roof with coped gables and kneelers. It contains a segmental-arched cart entry, above which is a niche with a date plaque. The doorway has a chamfered surround and composite jambs, and on the right gable is a decorative weathervane. |
| 23 Lyon Road, Eastburn; 53.89876°N 1.97292°W | — | Late 18th century | A rendered and pebbledashed house with a stone slate roof, it has two storeys and three bays. The central doorway has monolithic jambs and a triangular pediment. The windows are mullioned; in the left bay they have three lights and are stepped, and in the right bay they have two lights. |
| Ivy House; 53.89877°N 1.97261°W | — | Late 18th century | A stone house with quoins and a stone slate roof with coped gables and kneelers. There are two storeys and a symmetrical front of three bays. The central doorway has monolithic jambs and a triangular pediment. Above it is a rectangular window, and the other windows are Venetian windows with keystones. |
| Silsden Bridge; 53.90252°N 1.94332°W | — | Late 18th century | The bridge, which carries Keighley Road (A6034 road) over the River Aire, was widened in the mid-20th century. It is in stone with some concrete in the extension, and consists of three segmental arches, with rusticated voussoirs, pointed cutwaters, a band, a parapet that has circular end piers with hemispherical caps, and abutments. |
| Former Woodlands Mill; 53.89313°N 1.95134°W | | c. 1812 | The remaining parts of the former spinning mill have been converted for residential use, and are built in stone with slate roofs. These parts include the original block, with four storeys and nine bays, the number of bays diminishing due to the slope of the ground, and the block added in about 1860. This has a dentilled eaves band, five storeys and nine bays. |
| Gate piers and gates, Hawcliffe Rock; 53.89352°N 1.93594°W | — | c. 1830 | The gateway is in stone and in Gothic Revival style. The piers have panels with traceried tops rising to elaborate crocketed pinnacles. The gateway has a pointed arch that has three orders on clustered colonnettes with waterleaf capitals. The gates are iron and simple. |
| 1 and 2 St Stephen's Road, Steeton; 53.89679°N 1.94938°W | | Early to mid 19th century | A pair of stone cottages with stone slate roofs and two storeys. Each cottage has two bays. No. 2 is the earlier and has quoins, and No. 1 to the right is higher. Both cottages have doorways with monolithic jambs, and most of the windows are sashes. |
| Milestone near Meadow Field; 53.88809°N 1.93213°W | — | Early to mid 19th century | The milestone is on the southwest side of Keighley Road (B6265 road). It is in stone and cast iron, and has a triangular plan and a rounded top. On the top is inscribed "KEIGHLEY & KENDAL ROAD" and "STEETON WITH EASTBURN", and on the sides are the distances to Skipton, Keighley, and Settle. |
| Milestone in front of 52 Skipton Road, Eastburn; 53.89700°N 1.97346°W | | Early to mid 19th century | The milestone is on the southwest side of Skipton Road (B6265 road). It is in stone and cast iron, and has a triangular plan and a rounded top. On the top is inscribed "KEIGHLEY & KENDAL ROAD" and "STEETON WITH EASTBURN", and on the sides are the distances to Skipton, Keighley, Settle and Kendal. |
| Milestone in front of 10 Keighley Road, Steeton; 53.89573°N 1.94867°W | | Mid 19th century | The milestone is on the south side of Keighley Road (B6265 road). It is in stone and cast iron, and has a triangular plan and a rounded top. On the top is inscribed "KEIGHLEY & KENDAL ROAD" and "STEETON WITH EASTBURN", and on the sides are the distances to Skipton, Keighley, Settle, and Addingham. |
| Steeton Hall; 53.89830°N 1.94756°W | — | Mid 19th century | A large house incorporating earlier material, later used for other purposes. It is rendered and pebbledashed, with stone dressings, on a plinth, with rusticated quoins, a band, a modillioned eaves cornice, and a hipped Welsh slate roof. There are two storeys, a symmetrical front of three bays, and a rear wing. In the centre is a Doric tetrastyle portico with a parapet containing a cast iron grille. The windows are sashes with segmental-arched heads, projecting sills on consoles, and aprons. At the rear is a carved dated and initialled shield, and a doorway with Doric pilasters and a segmental pediment with a date in the tympanum. |
| St Stephen's Church, wall and gates 53.89684°N 1.94985°W | | 1880–81 | The church is in stone with a stone slate roof, and is in Early English style. It consists of a nave, a south porch, a south transept, a chancel with a north vestry, and a southeast steeple. The steeple consists of a three-stage tower and a broach spire with lucarnes. The windows are lancets, and the east window has three lights. The wall enclosing the churchyard has chamfered coping and cast and wrought iron railings with fleur-de-lis motifs. There are two sets of gate piers with octagonal pointed caps and gates matching the railings. |
| Victoria Tower and wall 53.89229°N 1.94202°W | | 1887 | The tower was built to commemorate the diamond jubilee of Queen Victoria, and has since been converted for residential use. It is in stone with quoins and chamfered bands. There is a square plan, with five stages, a doorway in the bottom stage, rectangular windows in the lower four stages, and the top stage is jettied on corbels and has an embattled parapet. The adjoining wall has an embattled parapet and contains an inscribed tablet. |
| Steeton Manor, balustrade and steps 53.89468°N 1.96404°W | — | 1895 | A large house in stone that has a stone slate roof with coped gables and finials, and a linking embattled parapet. The front has three storeys and attics, it has a U-shaped plan with projecting wings and three gables, and contains a porch with a balustraded parapet. At the rear are two storeys and gabled attics, and a two-storey porch with an embattled parapet and finials, containing a doorway with a segmental hood. Most of the windows are mullioned or mullioned and transomed, and there is an oriel window and a transomed stair window. In front of the house is a balustrade with an arched arcade, Gothic coping and ball finials, and steps with a similar balustrade. |
| St. Stephen's Sunday School; 53.89648°N 1.95002°W | — | 1896 | The Sunday school is in stone, and has a stone slate roof with coped gables and kneelers. It is in Gothic Revival style, and has one storey and an aisle on the north side. On this side is a gabled porch containing a doorway with a pointed arch, and three dormers. The pointed east window has five lights, and on the gable apex is a carved cross. At the west end is a lower hall at right angles. |
| Curregate Nursing Home; 53.89540°N 1.95997°W | — | 1912 | A house, later a nursing home, in stone, with quoins, a string course, and a stone slate roof with coped gables, kneelers and finials. There are two storeys and attics, and the entrance front has a U-shaped plan with projecting gabled wings. It contains mullioned and transomed windows, and a porch containing a Tudor arched doorway with carved spandrels, a shield above it, and an inner doorway with a dated lintel. At the rear are gabled wings, each with a two-storey canted bay window. |
| Walls and gates, The High Hall; 53.89703°N 1.94961°W | | c. 1921 | There are two gateways flanked by walls. The walls are in stone, with segmental coping, and are surmounted by wooden railings with iron spikes. The gate piers are in stone with a square section, and each pier has a plinth, a moulded cornice and a ball finial. The gates are in iron and form a semicircular arch in the centre. |
| Pillbox and two fire posts 53.89769°N 1.95023°W | — | c. 1940 | The pillbox and fire posts are to the south of the former Royal Ordnance Factory. They are in brick with concrete roofs and embrasures. The pillbox has two storeys, a hexagonal plan, a concrete floor between the storeys, and rifle loopholes. The fire posts are low and square, and have embrasures. |
