= Listed buildings in Heptonstall =

Heptonstall is a civil parish in the metropolitan borough of Calderdale, West Yorkshire, England. It contains 140 listed buildings that are recorded in the National Heritage List for England. Of these, seven are at Grade II*, the middle of the three grades, and the others are at Grade II, the lowest grade. The parish contains the village of Heptonstall and the area to the north and west. Most of the listed buildings are in the village, and along the valley of Colden Water to the west and the valley of Hebden Water to the northwest. In the village, most of the listed buildings are houses, cottages and associated structures, and in the valleys they are farmhouses and farm buildings, including laithe houses. There is a variety of other listed buildings, and these include churches and items in churchyards, a wayside cross, public houses, the remains of stocks, guide posts, bridges, an animal pound, a former watermill, a former Sunday school, the valve tower of a reservoir, and a telephone kiosk.

== Key ==
Grade	Criteria
II*	Particularly important buildings of more than special interest
II	Buildings of national importance and special interest

== Buildings ==
Name and location	Photograph	Date	Notes	Grade
Church of St. Thomas à Becket; 53.74886°N 2.02166°W		1260	The church was damaged in a gale in 1847, and is now a roofless ruin. The church is in stone, and the oldest fabric is in the base of the tower. The tower has been raised and many alterations have been carried out over the centuries. The church consists of a nave, a narrow south aisle, a south porch, and a wide north aisle. Both the nave and the north aisle have a chancel and a chantry chapel. The west tower has angle buttresses, an east stair turret, a west window, smaller north and south windows, circular north and east holes for former clock faces, and an embattled parapet with false machicolations. The porch has a moulded pointed archway and a coped gables, and at the junction of the nave and the chancel is a sanctus bellcote.	II*
Reaps Cross; 53.76883°N 2.08731°W		Medieval (possible)	A wayside cross that consists of a monolithic stone cross shaft standing in a square hole on a rough dressed boulder. The shaft is rectangular, it tapers towards the top, and has chamfered corners.	II
Old Edge; 53.75954°N 2.06770°W	—	Early 16th century	The house has a timber framed core, it was encased in stone in the 17th century, and later restored. The house has a stone slate roof, two storeys, three bays, and a rear kitchen wing. On the front is a two-storey porch with coped gables, kneelers, and a crocketed finial. The porch contains a doorway with a moulded surround, a segmental-arched lintel with an inscription and a date, and above it is a three-light double-chamfered mullioned stepped window. Elsewhere the windows are also mullioned, and above the ground floor is a continuous hood mould.	II*
Colden Great House; 53.75537°N 2.06283°W		Late 16th century	The house is in stone with a stone slate roof and two storeys. Its plan consists of a hall range, cross-wings, and a rear kitchen wing. The windows are mullioned, many with arched lights. By the east wing is a projecting two-storey gabled porch that has a doorway with a moulded surround and a hood mould.	II*
Barn northwest of Greenwood Lee; 53.76260°N 2.04703°W	—	Late 16th century	The aisled barn is in stone, and has six bays. In the north front is a tall cart entry, doorways with chamfered surrounds and Tudor arched lintels, and rectangular vents. In the south front is a tall cart entry with a chamfered surround and a gable, and a doorway with a Tudor arch.	II*
Stag Cottage and lock up, 38 Towngate; 53.74903°N 2.02043°W		Late 16th century	Part of a stone house that has a stone slate roof with a coped gable, kneelers, and a carved apex stone with a crocketed finial. There are two storeys and a basement, and the house consists of part of a range and a gabled cross-wing. The windows are mullioned, and a doorway with monolithic jambs has been inserted into a former mullioned window. In the basement is a doorway with monolithic jambs which led to a former lock-up.	II
Star Chamber Farmhouse and barn 53.74951°N 2.02197°W	—	Late 16th century (possible)	The building was altered in the 19th century and most of the detail dates from that time. It is in stone with quoins, and a stone slate roof with coped gables. There are two storeys, and the house has two bays, a rear outshut containing a doorway, and mullioned windows. The barn to the left contains a segmental-arched cart entry with a chamfered surround, a doorway with tie-stone jambs, and an arched doorway at the rear.	II
Whitehall Archway; 53.74957°N 2.02069°W		1578	The archway across a footpath has a monolithic lintel inscribed with initials and the date. It stands on piers from a later date, and is probably re-used.	II
Slack Top Cottage and Little Manor; 53.75507°N 2.03592°W	—	1599	A rear wing was added to the house in 1681. The house is in stone, with a stone slate roof, two storeys, a main range of three bays, a rear wing, and a rear outshut. The windows have chamfered surrounds, some have mullions, and some have modern replacements. The doorway has a chamfered surround and an arched head.	II
13/15 Northgate; 53.74977°N 2.02080°W	—	Late 16th or early 17th century	The front of the house dates from the 19th century. It is in stone, rendered on the front, and has a stone slate roof. The house consists of a single-storey hall range, and a two-storey gabled cross-wing. In the front of the hall range are two doorways, one blocked, the other with a date over the lintel, and at the rear is a doorway with monolithic jambs that has been converted into a window. Most of the windows are mullioned.	II
Cloth Hall; 53.74918°N 2.02130°W		Late 16th or early 17th century	The house is on the site of the former Cloth Hall, and a storey was added in the 18th century. It is in stone on a plinth, and has a stone slate roof and two storeys. On the front are two doorways, one blocked, with monolithic jambs. The windows are mullioned, and on the apex of the gable is a carved stone and a crocketed finial.	II
Bent Head; 53.76209°N 2.05065°W	—	Early 17th century	A stone house that has a stone slate roof with coped gables and kneelers. There are two storeys, three bays, and an aisle at the rear. On the front is a porch with a gable and an entrance with a chamfered surround, and a doorway with a moulded surround. Most of the windows are mullioned, and at the rear is a doorway with a chamfered surround.	II
Black Dyke Farmhouse and barn 53.75388°N 2.03852°W	—	Early 17th century	The house was altered and the barn was added in the early 18th century. The building is in stone with quoins and a stone slate roof. Most of the windows are mullioned, and the doorways have chamfered surrounds. On the front of the barn is a tall cart entry, and at the rear is a cart entry with a segmental arch, both with chamfered surrounds.	II
Ingham Well Farmhouse and barn 53.75588°N 2.05457°W	—	Early 17th century	The oldest part is the barn, with a pair of cottages added in the 19th century. The building is in stone with stone slate roofs, and the cottages have two storeys and two bay. The windows are mullioned, and there are paired doorways, one blocked. The barn to the right projects, forming an L-shaped plan. It has coped gables and a crocketed finial, and a wide gable end containing two doorways with chamfered surrounds. All the doorways have decorated lintels.	II
Lower Slater Ing; 53.75229°N 2.04068°W	—	Early 17th century	A stone house with a stone slate roof, two storeys, three bays, and a single-storey rear wing. The windows are mullioned, including a ten-light window in the upper floor, the doorway has a chamfered surround and a straight lintel, and at the rear is a gabled porch.	II
White Lion Public House; 53.74935°N 2.02148°W		Early 17th century	The oldest part of the public house is at the rear, with the frontage dating from the 19th century. It is in stone with quoins and a stone slate roof. There are three storeys, and at the rear is a double-span range with coped gables. At the front is a doorway with monolithic jambs, and all the windows are mullioned.	II
Workhouse Green Farmhouse and barn 53.76310°N 2.07853°W	—	1633	The farmhouse was extended and the barn added in the 19th century. The building is in stone with quoins and a stone slate roof. The house has two storeys and three bays. The windows are mullioned, and at the rear is a doorway with a chamfered surround and a dated lintel, and a later doorway with tie-stone jambs. The barn has a lower roof line, a semicircular-arched cart entry and a doorway with tie-stone jambs.	II
Higher Colden; 53.75637°N 2.06350°W	—	Early to mid-17th century	A stone house that has a stone slate roof with coped gables and kneelers. There are two storeys and three bays, and a single-storey aisle at the rear. The windows are mullioned, and above the ground floor windows on the front is a continuous hood mould. There are two doorways, each with a chamfered surround and composite jambs.	II
Great Lear Ings; 53.75265°N 2.04689°W		1648	A stone house that has a stone slate roof with coped gables. There are two storeys, a main range of three bays, a rear wing, and a single-storey outshut. On the front is a two-storey gabled porch that has a scrolled plinth, a Tudor arched entrance with a moulded surround, a lintel with the date in a tressure, and a hood mould, and the inner doorway has a chamfered surround and a Tudor arched lintel. Most of the windows are mullioned, and the rear wing has a gable with a carved apex stone and a ball finial.	II
2, 3 and 4 Swan Fold; 53.74943°N 2.02103°W	—	Mid-17th century	At one time a public house, and later divided into three cottages, the building is in stone, and has a stone slate roof with a coped gable and kneelers on the right. There are two storeys and the windows are mullioned. On the front are three doorways, one original with a chamfered surround and composite jambs, and the others have been inserted.	II
12 and 26 Towngate; 53.74874°N 2.02021°W	—	17th century	The house was altered in the 19th century and has been divided into two dwellings. It is in stone with a stone slate roof, and has two storeys, and an L-shaped plan. The front of No. 26 faces the road, and is gabled with kneelers. The doorway and windows on the front have chamfered surrounds. To the right, a bay projects, and to the right is an archway leading to the rear, which contains mullioned windows.	II
Bents Knoll; 53.77166°N 2.05039°W	—	17th century	A stone house with quoins and a stone slate roof. There are two storeys and three bays. Most of the windows are mullioned, and there are doorways at the front and the rear, each with a chamfered surround and composite jambs.	II
Cross Inn; 53.74926°N 2.02087°W		17th century	A house that was refronted in the 19th century, it was later a public house. It is in stone with a stone slate roof, two storeys and an attic, and the front facing the street has three bays. In the centre is a doorway with monolithic jambs, and a decorative cornice on consoles, and above it is a signboard in a recess. To the left is a two-storey canted bay window, and to the right is a two-storey semi-octagonal bay window. Incorporated at the rear is No. 1 Northgate, which has a doorway with tie-stone jambs, and a mullioned window.	II
Everhill Shaw Farmhouse and barn 53.76291°N 2.07622°W	—	Mid-17th century	The house was extended in the 18th century, and the barn was added in the 19th century. The building is in stone with a stone slate roof. The house has two storeys and three bays, and the windows are chamfered with moulded mullions. On the front is a gabled porch with chamfered jambs, and the doorway has moulded jambs and a segmental-arched lintel. The barn has a segmental-arched cart entry, a Venetian window with an impost and false keystone above, and doorways and square windows to the sides.	II
Greenwood Lee; 53.76246°N 2.04658°W		Mid-17th century (probable)	A large stone house that has a stone slate roof with coped gables, kneelers, and ball finials. There are two storeys, and an F-shaped plan consisting of a three-bay main range, a cross-wing on the right, a two-storey porch, and a rear wing. The porch has a coped gable, kneelers, and acorn finials, and a doorway with a scrolled plinth and a moulded architrave. Above the doorway is an initialled and dated plaque, a window of three over five lights, and a decorative hood mould. The windows are mullioned, those in the ground floor are chamfered and have moulded mullions, and in the main range is a seven-light window.	II*
Halstead Green; 53.75619°N 2.06006°W	—	17th century	A house that was altered and extended in the 19th century to form three cottages, it is in stone with a stone slate roof. There are two storeys and five bays. Some of the windows are mullioned, and others have been altered, and the doorways have monolithic jambs.	II
Hoar Side Farmhouse and barn 53.76185°N 2.09263°W	—	17th century	A barn was added to the farmhouse in the 19th century. The building is in stone with a stone slate roof. The house has two storeys, mullioned windows, and on the front is a lean-to porch and an outshut. In the barn is an arched cart entry with a Venetian window above, a doorway, a lunette, and a date plaque.	II
Hudson Fold Cottages and barn 53.75423°N 2.05780°W		Mid-17th century	The cottages were extended in the 19th century. The building is in stone with quoins and a stone slate roof. The cottages have two storeys, two bays, and a gabled cellar at the rear. The windows are mullioned, and in the left bay is a doorway with tie-stone jambs. In the barn is an arched cart entry with a keystone, a Venetian window above, and a doorway with a chamfered surround to the left.	II
Little Stoneshey Gate and Stoneshey Cottage; 53.75726°N 2.04010°W	—	17th century	A house was added to the original house at right angles in the 18th century. The building is in stone with a stone slate roof, two storeys, and both parts have mullioned windows. The early part has two bays, and hood moulds over the windows. The later part has a coped gable with kneelers, and a doorway with a chamfered surround and monolithic jambs.	II
Whitehall Farmhouse; 53.74969°N 2.02105°W	—	Mid-17th century	The upper storeys were rebuilt in the 19th century. The house is in stone, with a stone slate roof that has coped gables with carved shields. There are two storeys a double-depth plan, and three gabled bays. On the front is an inserted doorway, and at the rear are two doorways with ogee lintels, and an original doorway with a chamfered surround. The windows are mullioned.	II
Barn northwest of Acre Farmhouse; 53.75953°N 2.04396°W	—	Late 17th century	The barn is in stone with quoins, and a stone slate roof with coped gables and kneelers. There is a single aisle, and it contains a cart entry with a chamfered surround, composite jambs, and a monolithic lintel, and a doorway to the right.	II
Gateway to Churchyard; 53.74915°N 2.02121°W		Late 17th century	At the north entrance to the churchyard is a segmental arch with chamfered moulded surrounds. On the top is moulded coping, and three ball finials on square plinths.	II
Gateway, steps and outbuilding, Former Grammar School; 53.74876°N 2.02137°W		Late 17th century (possible)	The gateway has a moulded surround, composite jambs, and a dated lintel. It is approached by two flights of steps with a half-landing and cast iron railings. Adjacent, and approached from the landing, is a stone outbuilding with quoins and a stone slate roof.	II
High Gate Farmhouse, High Gate House and barn 53.75565°N 2.05665°W		Late 17th century	A house was added to the east of the farmhouse in the 18th century, and a barn to the west in the 19th century. The building is in stone with quoins, and has a stone slate roof with a coped gable. The farmhouse and house have two storeys and two bays each, and the house has a rear wing. The windows are mullioned, and in the rear wing is a segmental-arched doorway with a moulded surround and composite jambs. In the barn is a segmental-arched cart entry, a Venetian window above it with dovecotes to the sides, and a doorway with a chamfered surround to the right.	II
Acre Farmhouse, Acre House and mounting block 53.75944°N 2.04373°W	—	c. 1700	In the mid-18th century, a rear wing and an extension to the front were added. The house is in stone, and has a stone slate roof with coped gables and kneelers on the rear wing. There are two storeys, and the main range has three bays. The doorway has a moulded surround and a segmental-ached lintel. The windows are mullioned, and in the right return is a stair window. Attached to front of the house is a mounting block formed by five steps on each side.	II
Sweet Briar Cottage, 37 and 39 Towngate; 53.74910°N 2.02101°W	—	c. 1700	A pair of stone cottages with quoins on the left, and a stone slate roof with a coped gable on the left. Each cottage has one bay and three storeys, and No. 37 also has a basement. The doorways have chamfered surrounds and tie-stone jambs, and the windows are mullioned.	II
Furley House, 35 Towngate; 53.74906°N 2.02092°W	—	Late 17th or early 18th century	A stone house with quoins, gutter brackets, and a stone slate roof. There are three storeys and one bay. The doorway on the front has a chamfered surround, and the windows are mullioned. At the rear is a doorway with tie-stone jambs.	II
Litherstone, 2, 4 and 6 Northgate; 53.74915°N 2.02067°W	—	Late 17th or early 18th century	A house converted into three cottages in the 19th century, it is in stone with quoins and a stone slate roof. There are two storeys and a basement, and each cottage has a doorway and windows that vary. The left doorway has a chamfered surround and a segmental-arched lintel, and the other doorways have monolithic jambs. At the rear is an outshut, a mullioned window, and an inscribed plaque.	II
Mould Grain Farmhouse and barn 53.76877°N 2.05061°W	—	Late 17th or early 18th century	The building is in stone, with a double plinth in the right return, and a stone slate roof with coped gables and kneelers. There are two storeys, the house has two bays, and at the rear is a single-bay extension. The windows are mullioned, there is an inserted doorway on the front with tie-stone jambs, and the original doorway at the rear has a chamfered surround and a large lintel. The barn has four bays, and contains a semicircular-ached cart entry and a doorway, both with chamfered surrounds.	II
1, 2, 3 and 4 Hollins; 53.74727°N 2.01584°W	—	Early 18th century	A row of four stone cottages; Nos. 3 and 4 were added in the early 19th century. The cottages have quoins and a stone slate roof. There are two storeys, and each cottage has one bay. No. 1 has a lean-to porch, and No. 2 has a doorway with a chamfered surround. The windows are mullioned.	II
14 and 15 Hollins and barn 53.74825°N 2.01563°W	—	Early 18th century	A barn was added to the house in the 19th century, and the buildings are in stone with a stone slate roof. The house has two storeys and two bays, and it contains an inserted doorway on the front. Some windows are mullioned and others are sashes. The barn to the right has an arched cart entry with a keystone, and doorways to the sides, and above are windows and lunettes, one converted into a window. At the rear is the original doorway that has a chamfered surround and a straight lintel.	II
Bakehouse west of 15 Hollins; 53.74820°N 2.01582°W	—	Early 18th century	The bakehouse or brewhouse is in stone with a stone slate roof. It has a single storey, and contains two doorways with tie-stone jambs, mullioned windows, openings for ventilation, and in the right return is a doorway in a former upper floor.	II
Hudson Fold Hall; 53.75414°N 2.05809°W		Early 18th century	The house was extended to the right in 1838. Both parts are in stone with stone slate roofs, two storeys, and mullioned windows. The later part has quoins, a higher roof line, and a coped gable with kneelers to the right. There is a doorway with monolithic jambs converted into a window, and a semicircular-arched stair window with a keystone and a dated lintel.	II
Little Learings Farmhouse; 53.75309°N 2.04830°W		Early 18th century	A stone house with quoins, and a stone slate roof with gables and kneelers. There are two storeys, three bays, and an outshut with a dovecote. The windows are chamfered and mullioned with five lights.	II
Widdop Gate; 53.77673°N 2.05374°W		Early 18th century	The house, which was extended in the 19th century, is in stone with quoins, a stone slate roof, and two storeys. On the front are two doorways, the earlier one with a chamfered surround, and the later one to the right with monolithic jambs. The windows are chamfered and mullioned.	II
15/17 Towngate; 53.74854°N 2.02021°W	—	1729	A stone house with quoins, and a stone slate roof with a coped gable on the left. There are two storeys and two bays. The doorway has a dated lintel, the windows are mullioned, and there is a blocked taking-in door with monolithic jambs.	II
Flats 1 and 2, 41 Towngate; 53.74913°N 2.02115°W	—	c. 1730	A pair of stone houses with rusticated quoins, floor bands, a modillion cornice, and a stone slate roof with coped gables. There are three storeys and two bays. On the front are two doorways with architraves, each with a cornice and a triangular pediment. The right doorway has been converted into a window, and steps with cast iron railings lead up to the left doorway. In the middle floor, the windows have altered glazing, and the top floor contains a five-light mullioned window. The windows at the rear are sashes.	II
Boothroyd Farmhouse; 53.76676°N 2.05034°W	—	1733	The farmhouse is in stone with quoins, and a stone slate roof with coped gables and kneelers. There are two storeys and a cellar-basement, a double-depth plan, and two bays. Most of the windows are mullioned. The main doorway is at the rear, and has a moulded surround and a segmental-arched lintel with the date in relief, and at the front is an inserted doorway with monolithic jambs.	II
Lane Head House, 1 and 4 Smithwell Lane; 53.74948°N 2.02248°W	—	1735	A stone house on a plinth, with a moulded string course, and a stone slate roof with coped gables and kneelers. There are two storeys and a double-depth plan. The windows are mullioned, and the doorway has a depressed Tudor arched lintel with the date and initials in a moulded surround. In the right return is an upper floor doorway with a moulded surround and a straight lintel. At the rear is a gabled porch, and a tall stair window.	II
Jasmine Cottage and archway, 6/8 Towngate; 53.74864°N 2.02007°W	—	Early to mid-18th century	The house is in stone with a stone slate roof and two storeys. In the centre is a doorway with a chamfered surround and tie-stone jambs that has been converted into a window, and the other windows are mullioned. To the left are quoins and a semicircular arch with a window above.	II
Lumb Cottage; 53.75097°N 2.03561°W	—	Early to mid-18th century (probable)	A stone house with quoins and a stone slate roof. The house is built back to earth, there are four storeys, and two bays. The windows are mullioned, and there are doorways and an inserted garage door.	II
Springdale and 20 Mid Slack; 53.75434°N 2.03202°W	—	Early to mid-18th century	A pair of cottages, extended in the 19th century, they are in stone and have stone slate roofs with coped gables. There are two storeys, the original part has two bays, and the extension to the right projects and has a catslide roof. In the original part are paired doorways with tie-stone jambs, the extension contains a doorway with sill-tie jambs, and the windows are mullioned.	II
Waterloo House; 53.75470°N 2.03454°W	—	Early to mid-18th century	A stone house with quoins, a stone slate roof, and two storeys. In the centre is a wide gabled porch, and two doorways with chamfered surrounds. The porch is flanked by mullioned windows, and at the rear the windows are also mullioned.	II
Longfield House, wall and railings, Towngate; 53.74862°N 2.02047°W		1730s	A stone house that has a stone slate roof with coped gables. There are two storeys and an attic, a double-depth plan, and a front of five bays. The central doorway has an architrave, a pulvinated frieze, and a triangular pediment, and at the rear is a doorway with a moulded surround. The windows are cross windows with mullions and transoms. In front of the house is a stone wall with copings and iron railings, some with urn finials.	II
5 and 7 Northgate; 53.74939°N 2.02076°W	—	1736	A stone house with a stone slate roof that has a coped gable with kneelers. There are two storeys, and the windows are mullioned. The doorway has a tie-stone jamb and a moulded surround, and above it is a decorative tablet carved in shallow relief with initials, the date, and figures of a man and a woman. There is a later inserted doorway, and at the rear is a taking-in door.	II
28, 30 and 32 Northgate; 53.74959°N 2.02035°W	—	Mid-18th century	A pair of cottages with another cottage, No. 28, added in 1769. They are in stone with quoins, a stone slate roof with gables and kneelers, and mullioned windows. Nos. 30 and 32 have three storeys at the front and two at the rear, and No. 28 has two storeys at the front and rear. Nos. 30 and 32 have paired doorways with monolithic jambs at the front and with tie-stone jambs at the rear. Also at the rear is a taking-in door, and at the rear of No. 28 is a doorway with a dated lintel.	II
40 and 42 Northgate; 53.74986°N 2.02044°W	—	Mid-18th century (probable)	A pair of stone houses with quoins and a stone slate roof. There are two storeys and three bays. The windows are mullioned, and at the rear are three doorways, two with tie-stone jambs, and the other is blocked.	II
Walls, railings and gateway, Church of St. Thomas à Becket; 53.74890°N 2.02131°W		Mid-18th century (probable)	In front of the church is a low stone wall surmounted by 19th-century cast iron railings with urn finials. At the south end is a pillar with a bell-shaped cap, and double cast iron gates with urn finials.	II
Egypt Farmhouse and barn 53.76612°N 2.08464°W		Mid-18th century (probable)	The barn was added in the early 19th century. The building is in stone with quoins and a stone slate roof. The house has two storeys, a double-depth plan, and two bays. The doorway has a chamfered surround and composite jambs. In the upper floor of the west front are sash windows, and the other windows are mullioned. The barn has a cart entry, and at the rear is an aisle or an outshut.	II
Lower Fold Farmhouse and barn 53.76194°N 2.07445°W	—	Mid-18th century	Originally a laithe house, it was altered and extended in the 19th century. The building is in stone with quoins, a stone slate roof, and two storeys. To the left the barn has a semicircular-arched cart entry, with a Venetian window above, and a segmental-arched doorway. To the right are three doorways with tie-stone jambs, and square and mullioned windows. Further to the right is a cart entry with a chamfered surround and a monolithic lintel.	II
New Edge Farmhouse, barn and cottage 53.76087°N 2.07014°W		Mid-18th century	A laithe house with a cottage added later, it is in stone with quoins, and a stone slate roof with coped gables and kneelers. The cottage to the right has five-light chamfered mullioned windows, and a doorway in the right gable end. To the left is a segmental-arched cart entry flanked by doorways with chamfered surrounds. The house further to the left has two bays, and contains windows and a taking-in door, and on the left return is an outshut containing a cellar door.	II
New Greenwood Lee Farmhouse and barn 53.76102°N 2.04582°W		Mid-18th century	The barn was added to the farmhouse in the 19th century. The building is in stone with quoins, and has a stone slate roof with coped gables and kneelers. The house has two storeys and two bays, there is a porch and a doorway with a chamfered surround, and the windows are mullioned. The barn to the right contains a segmental-arched cart entry, with an owl hole above, and a doorway to the right.	II
Popples Close Farmhouse and barn 53.76600°N 2.07891°W	—	Mid-18th century	A laithe house in stone with a stone slate roof. The house has one storey with an attic, a double-depth plan, two bays, and mullioned windows. The barn to the left has a segmental-arched cart entry, and a doorway to its left.	II
Royd Farmhouse and barn 53.74858°N 2.01986°W	—	Mid-18th century	The former barn has been converted for residential use. The building is in stone with a stone slate roof, and two storeys. The house to the left has mullioned windows, a doorway with monolithic jambs, and a coped gable to the right. The former barn has a lower roof line, and contains on the front an arched cart entry, a Venetian window above, to the left is a cart entry with a chamfered surround and straight lintel converted into a window and doorway, and to the right is a doorway with a quoined lintel converted into a window. On the angle are quoins, and the wide right return is gabled. This contains rectangular vents, and at the top is a Venetian window with an impost and a false keystone.	II
Remains of stocks 53.75022°N 2.02006°W		18th century	Part of the original township stocks, later converted into a guide post. It is a vertical stone inscribed with a hand pointing the direction to Haworth.	II
Coachman's Cottage and barn, Stoneshey Gate; 53.75693°N 2.03980°W	—	Mid-18th century	A laithe house in stone with quoins and a stone slate roof. On the front facing the road there is one storey, and at the rear are two storeys and an attic. On the front is a semicircular-arched cart entry, with a sash window above, and a doorway to the right. Further to the right is the house doorway that has tie-stone jambs, and a mullioned window. At the rear, above the cart entry, is a Venetian window, and there are also mullioned windows and a dovecote. On the left gable is a weathervane.	II
Stoodley View, 40 and 42 Towngate; 53.74908°N 2.02054°W	—	18th century	The oldest part is No. 42, which was the cross-wing of a house that was partly demolished, and No. 40. which was added in the 19th century to provide infill with the adjacent house. The house is in stone with quoins, a stone slate roof with gables and kneelers, and two storeys and a basement. The doorway of No. 42 has a monolithic jamb, and the doorway to No. 40 has tie-stone jambs. The windows in both parts are mullioned.	II
Barn north of Whitehall Farmhouse; 53.74981°N 2.02106°W	—	Mid-18th century (probable)	A stone barn with quoins, and a stone slate roof with a coped gable and kneelers on the right. In the front facing the yard are a cart entry and a doorway, each with a monolithic lintel, and mullioned windows. On the front facing the lane is a lean-to porch, and a doorway with tie-stone jambs, above which is a Venetian window with a false keystone.	II
Wesleyan Methodist Chapel; 53.74985°N 2.02015°W		1764	The original plan of the chapel was that of a symmetrical octagon, and it was elongated in 1802. It is in stone on a chamfered plinth, with rusticated quoins at the angles, a band, and a slate roof. The original doorway, which has been converted into a window, has tall monolithic jambs, a semicircular head, a moulded impost and a triple keystone. The later doorways have monolithic jambs and fanlights, and there are two tiers of windows with plain surrounds. Inside, there is a gallery with canted ends on Tuscan columns.	II*
11 and 12 Hollins; 53.74790°N 2.01560°W	—	Mid- to late 18th century	A pair of houses with quoins and a stone slate roof with coped gables and kneelers. There are two storeys and an attic, a double-depth plan, and each house has one bay. In the centre are paired doorways with a chamfered surround, and the windows are double chamfered with mullions. In the left return is a doorway that has been converted into a window, in the attic is a square window, and at the rear is a well for a waterwheel.	II
Cragg Side; 53.75838°N 2.04210°W		Mid- to late 18th century	A row of five stone cottages that have a stone slate roof with coped gables and kneelers. There are two storeys, and each cottage has one bay, a doorway with tie-stone jambs, and mullioned windows.	II
6/9 and 7/8 Hollins; 53.74776°N 2.01573°W	—	1771	A pair of stone houses on a chamfered plinth, with rusticated quoins, a broad band, and a stone slate roof with coped gables and kneelers. There are two storeys and an attic, and each house has one bay. In the centre are paired doorways with monolithic jambs, a pulvinated frieze, and a cornice. Above is a recess containing a dated plaque, and the windows are mullioned. In the right return is a doorway with tie-stone jambs, and in the attic there is an oculus.	II
Grammar School Museum; 53.74833°N 2.02141°W		1771	A pair of cottages were later added to the school, and it has all been converted into a museum. The building is in stone and has a stone slate roof with coped gables to the south. The school has two storeys on Church Lane and one at the front, and the cottages have three storeys to Church Lane and two to the front. The school has three bays, and contains Venetian windows with false keystones, a window with a semicircular-arched lintel, an impost block, and a keystone, doorways with chamfered surrounds and tie-stone jambs, an inscribed stone, and an inscribed plaque. The windows in the cottages are chamfered and mullioned.	II
2, 3/4 and 5 Caycroft Nook; 53.75070°N 2.02040°W	—	Late 18th century	A group of three stone buildings, with stone slate roofs, two storeys, and mullioned windows. The oldest is No. 5, with the others added in the 19th century. No. 5, on the right, has one bay, quoins, and a two-light window in each floor. No. 3/4, in the middle, originated as two cottages with one bay each and later combined, it has paired central doorways, one of which is blocked. No. 2, on the left, is at right angles and has a coped gable.	II
10 Hollins; 53.74777°N 2.01586°W	—	Late 18th century	A stone house with quoins, a stone slate roof, and two storeys. In the gable end facing south is a seven-light mullioned window in each floor, and in the apex is a dovecote.	II
Barn west of 42 Northgate; 53.74998°N 2.02060°W	—	Late 18th century	A stone barn with quoins, and a stone slate roof with coped gables and kneelers. On the front is a segmental-arched cart entry, above which is a Venetian window, and to the sides are doorways with tie-stone jambs. In the right return are chamfered rectangular vents and an owl hole. At the rear is a similar cart entry with a square window above and flanking doorways.	II
53 Towngate, wall and former gateway 53.74927°N 2.02160°W	—	Late 18th century	A pair of cottages, later combined into one house, it is in stone with quoins and a stone slate roof. There are two storeys and two bays. The windows are mullioned, and flanking the ground floor windows at the front are doorways. At the rear is a wall with moulded coping containing the remains of a blocked gateway to the churchyard, consisting of a lintel and a composite jamb with a moulded surround.	II
1, 2 and 3 Wadsworth View; 53.74938°N 2.02061°W	—	Late 18th century	A row of stone cottages with quoins and a stone slate roof. There are two storeys, and each cottage has one bay, a doorway, and three-light mullioned windows, the middle lights being taller.	II
1–11 West Laithe; 53.74840°N 2.02138°W		Late 18th century	A row of six stone cottages with quoins and a stone slate roof. There are two storeys, and underdwellings back-to-earth. Each cottage has one bay, and a doorway at the front and at the rear. The windows are mullioned, and the lintel of No. 1 is dated.	II
Guide post west of 31 Edge Hey Green; 53.75502°N 2.04933°W		Late 18th century (probable)	The guide post is an upright stone with an arched top. It is inscribed with pointing hands, and the distances to Heptonstall and Burnley.	II
High Greenwood House; 53.77263°N 2.04779°W		Late 18th century	A stone house on a plinth, with a modillion eaves cornice, and a stone slate roof with coped gables. There are two storeys and an attic, and a symmetrical front of three bays. The central doorway has an architrave, a pulvinated frieze, and a triangular pediment. Above the doorway is a tall rectangular window, and in the other bays are tripartite sash windows. In the right return is a doorway with an architrave, a frieze, an entablature, and a cornice, and above it is a sash window and a Venetian window in the attic. At the rear is a concave eaves cornice, a lean-to, and mullioned windows.	II
Stable and coach house, High Greenwood House; 53.75693°N 2.03980°W	—	Late 18th century	The stable and coach house is in stone, with a stone slate roof and two storeys. On the front are four chamfered doorways and a chamfered square window above. In the left return is an arched carriage entry with an impost and a keystone. At the rear is a chamfered mullioned window.	II
Ivy Cottage; 53.75457°N 2.03370°W	—	Late 18th century	A stone house with quoins, a stone slate roof, an L-shaped plan, a front of two bays, and a gabled single-bay single-storey extension to the right. The left bay has two storeys, and contains mullioned windows. The right bay is recessed and has two storeys and an attic. There is a porch with a flat roof giving access to a taking-in door with monolithic jambs, and to the right is a Venetian window with an impost and a keystone.	II
Less Colden Farmhouse and barn 53.75565°N 2.06253°W	—	Late 18th century (probable)	A laithe house in stone with a stone slate roof. The house has two storeys, mullioned windows, and a doorway with monolithic jambs. The barn to the right has a semicircular-arched cart entry, and a doorway with tie-stone jambs.	II
Slack Bottom; 53.75351°N 2.02932°W		Late 18th century	A row of six stone cottages with quoins, and a stone slate roof with coped gables and kneelers. There are two storeys, and each cottage has one bay, a doorway with tie-stone jambs, and mullioned windows with a central stepped light.	II
Spink House; 53.75639°N 2.06007°W	—	Late 18th century	A stone house with quoins and a stone slate roof. There are two storeys, two bays, and a gabled extension at the rear. The windows are mullioned, and at the rear is a 20th-century glass porch.	II
The Slack; 53.75431°N 2.03136°W	—	Late 18th century	A stone house with rusticated quoins, a dentilled eaves cornice, and a stone slate roof with coped gables. There are two storeys and a symmetrical front of three bays. The central doorway has an architrave, a pulvinated frieze, and a triangular pediment. Above the doorway is a single-light window, and in the other bays are tripartite sash windows. In the left return is a two-storey gabled porch with a heraldic coat of arms in relief over the doorway, and in the gable apex is a Venetian window with an impost and a keystone. At the rear is a staircase window and mullioned windows.	II
Chantry House; 53.74857°N 2.02156°W		1779	At one time a charnel house, the house is in stone with quoins, and a stone slate roof with a broad coped gable. There are two storeys and an attic, and many of the windows are mullioned. The main doorways are at the rear, they have chamfered surrounds and tie-stone jambs, and one has been blocked. On the front is an upper floor doorway that has been converted into a window, and in the attic is a moulded recess containing a decorative dated tablet.	II
Stoneshey Gate House; 53.75726°N 2.04012°W		1784	A stone house with rusticated quoins, an eaves cornice, moulded gutter brackets, and a stone slate roof with coped gables and kneelers. There are two storeys on the front and three at the rear, six bays at the front and five at the rear. In the second bay on the front is a doorway with an architrave, a pulvinated frieze, and a pediment with the date in the tympanum. The fourth bay contains a doorway with monolithic jambs, a frieze, and a cornice, and the windows on the front are sashes. In the right return is a Venetian window in the attic, and at the rear are mullioned windows and a stair window with impost blocks and a keystone.	II
2, 4, 6, 8/10 and 12 Smithwell Lane; 53.74961°N 2.02234°W		c. 1800	A row of six stone cottages with quoins and a stone slate roof. There are two storeys, and each cottage has one bay, a doorway and a six-light mullioned window in each floor.	II
Northwell Cottage; 53.75122°N 2.01849°W		c. 1800	A stone house with quoins and a stone slate roof. It is built back to earth, and has three storeys and four bays. The windows are mullioned, there is a blocked bull's eye window in the gable apex, and at the rear is a doorway with tie-stone jambs in the middle floor, and a taking-in door in the apex.	II
Bank Cottage; 53.74886°N 2.02092°W	—	Late 18th or early 19th century	A house later used for other purposes, it is in stone with quoins, a stone slate roof, and three storeys. On the front is a square window in each floor, and a doorway with tie-stone jambs. There is a similar doorway in the left return, and in the right return are five-light mullioned windows in the upper two floors.	II
Guide post in fork of road 53.75464°N 2.03540°W	—	Late 18th or early 19th century (probable)	The guide post at the junction of Burnley Road and Widdop Road is an upright stone. It is inscribed with pointing hands, and the distances to Burnley, Colne, Widdop, Heptonstall and Halifax.	II
High Greenwood Farmhouse; 53.77296°N 2.04857°W	—	Late 18th or early 19th century	A stone house with quoins and a stone slate roof. There are two storeys and two bays. The windows are mullioned, and in the right gable end is a doorway with tie-stone jambs.	II
Lily Hall; 53.74724°N 2.01851°W	—	Late 18th or early 19th century	A row of four cottages with quoins, and a stone slate roof with gables and kneelers. There are three storeys, four bays, and a single-bay two-storey extension. The windows are mullioned, and each cottage has a doorway.	II
Longtail; 53.75800°N 2.06392°W	—	Late 18th or early 19th century	A house, later divided, it is in stone, with quoins, and a stone slate roof with coped gables and kneelers. There are two storeys and three bays. Each bay contains mullioned windows, and a doorway with monolithic jambs, the doorways in the outer bays being blocked.	II
New Bridge; 53.75800°N 2.01918°W		18th to early 19th century	The bridge carries a road over Hebden Water. It is in stone, and consists of a single segmental arch. The bridge has a keystone, a band, a parapet and copings.	II
Barn west of School Land Farmhouse; 53.75686°N 2.06681°W	—	Late 18th or early 19th century	A stone barn with quoins, and a stone slate roof. It has a single aisle and three bays. In a portal of the aisle is a cart entry, and in the angle is a doorway. The aisle has two windows, the cart entry at the western end has composite jambs and a large monolithic lintel. In the north gable is an owl hole.	II
Barn west of The Slack; 53.75431°N 2.03172°W	—	1801	The barn is in stone with quoins, and a stone slate roof with coped gables and kneelers. It has three bays, and it contains a segmental-arched cart entry with tie-stone jambs. Above it is a Venetian window with an impost and a false keystone, and to the sides are doorways. In the right return is a doorway, square windows, rectangular vents, and a dated Venetian window.	II
Former Baptist Chapel and Manse; 53.75489°N 2.03667°W		1807	The oldest part is the remaining bay of a former chapel house. The manse was added to the left in about 1830, and the chapel at right angles to the right in 1878–79. The buildings are in stone, and the chapel is in Italianate style. The chapel has a pedimented gabled front of five bays and two storeys, with channelled quoin pilasters and pilaster strips. In the centre are paired arched doorways with fanlights flanked by two-light arched windows. In the upper floor are tall arched windows, and all the windows have hood moulds. Above is an inscribed plaque, and in the tympanum are three windows, a Lombard frieze, and an eaves cornice. The manse has quoins, two storeys and three bays, and contains a doorway and sash windows.	II
Boundary walls, gate piers and gates, Former Baptist Church; 53.75475°N 2.03602°W	—	1807	The wall, which is in stone, was extended in 1878, and encloses the burial ground. At the apex of the site are octagonal monolithic gate piers with cast iron finials. The gates are in iron and have dogbars and spearhead finials.	II
Broadstone Farmhouse, Broadstone and barn 53.75482°N 2.05954°W		1811	A laithe house later converted into two dwellings, it is in stone with quoins, an eaves band, and a stone slate roof with coped gables and kneelers. There are two storeys, and on the front of the house is a doorway with monolithic jambs and sash windows. The barn to the right has a segmental-arched cart entry above which is a Venetian window with an impost a keystone, and a dated lintel, and a doorway with tie-stone jambs. In the apex of the gable is an owl hole, and at the rear of the barn are windows similar to the front. At the rear of the house are mullioned windows and a round-arched stair window with an impost block and a keystone, and there are inserted dormers.	II
2–18 Church Street; 53.74908°N 2.02245°W	—	c. 1820	A row of nine stone cottages with quoins and a stone slate roof. No 8 was inserted between two phases of building. The cottages have two storeys, and each has one bay, a doorway, and mullioned windows, most with three lights in the ground floor and four in the upper floor. No. 8 has an inserted garage door, and in the left gable end is a circular attic window.	II
20–26 Church Street; 53.74883°N 2.02273°W		c. 1820	A row of four stone cottages that have a stone slate roof with a coped gable and kneelers on the left. There are two storeys and each cottage has one bay, a doorway, and mullioned windows, with three lights in the ground floor and four in the upper floor. At the right end is a lean-to containing four privies.	II
1–8 Silver Street; 53.74947°N 2.02313°W	—	c. 1820	A row of eight stone cottages with a stone slate roof. There are two storeys, and each cottage has one bay, a doorway, and mullioned windows. On the front of No. 7 is an inscribed copper tablet.	II
5–13 Smithwell Lane; 53.74954°N 2.02266°W	—	c. 1820	A row of five stone cottages with a stone slate roof. They have two storeys, and each cottage has one bay, a doorway, and mullioned windows with three lights in the ground floor and four lights in the upper floor.	II
15 Smithwell Lane; 53.74964°N 2.02298°W	—	c. 1820	A stone house that has a stone slate roof with a coped gable and kneelers. There are two storeys and an attic, and the gable end faces the street. In the attic is an arched windows, and the other windows are mullioned.	II
16, 18, 20 and 22 Smithwell Lane and railings 53.74972°N 2.02276°W	—	c. 1820	A row of four stone cottages with quoins, and a stone slate roof with a coped gable on the left. There are two storeys, and each cottage has one bay. Three steps with cast iron railings lead up to the doorways on the right of each cottage. The windows are mullioned, those in the ground floor with three lights, and with four lights in the upper floor.	II
24, 26, 28 and 28A Smithwell Lane and railings 53.74984°N 2.02312°W	—	c. 1820	A row of four stone cottages with quoins, and a stone slate roof with coped gables. There are two storeys, and each cottage has one bay. Five steps with cast iron railings lead up flagged landings with cellars beneath. The doorways are on the right of each cottage, and the windows are mullioned, with three lights in each floor.	II
1–5 Gibson's Mill Cottages; 53.76505°N 2.04216°W		Early 19th century	A row of five stone cottages with quoins and a stone slate roof. There are two storeys, and each cottage has one bay. Most of the windows are mullioned, the doorway of No. 1 has monolithic jambs, and the doorways of the other cottages have tie-stone jambs.	II
6 Gibson's Mill Cottages; 53.76492°N 2.04233°W	—	Early 19th century	The cottage, adjacent to Gibson's Bridge, is in stone with quoins and a stone slate roof. There are two storeys, one bay, and an outshut, and the windows are mullioned. On the front is a doorway with a sill-tie, steps lead up to a doorway in the right return that has tie-stone jambs, and there are two doorways on the outshut.	II
1, 2/3, and 4–9 Knowl Top; 53.75537°N 2.04563°W		Early 19th century	A row of nine stone cottages with quoins and a stone slate roof. There are two storeys on the front facing the road and three at the rear, and each cottage has a single bay, a doorway, and mullioned windows.	II
7, 9, 10, 11 and 12 Northfield; 53.75017°N 2.02071°W	—	Early 19th century	A row of back to back cottages in stone, with quoins, and a stone slate roof with a coped gable and kneelers. There are two storeys, and each house has a doorway with tie-stone jambs, and a window of two square lights in the ground floor, and most have a four-light mullioned window in the upper floor.	II
Gateway attached to 7 Northfield and stables 53.74948°N 2.02076°W	—	Early 19th century	The stables are in stone with a stone slate roof, and have a gable facing the yard. On the front are two doorways with monolithic jambs, one blocked. On the left is a two-light mullioned window, and in the gable end are two large square pitching holes. Attached to the adjacent house is a wide semicircular arch with solid spandrels and dressed coping.	II
Barn attached to 2 Swan Fold; 53.74945°N 2.02123°W	—	Early 19th century	The barn is in stone with quoins and a stone slate roof. On the front is a semicircular-arched cart entry and a Venetian window above. The doorway has a chamfered surround and a depressed Tudor arched lintel, and there is a square window. In the gable are small rectangular vents, and at the rear is a smaller doorway with a chamfered surround and a segmental-arched lintel.	II
11/13 Towngate; 53.74855°N 2.02024°W	—	Early 19th century	A stone house with a stone slate roof, and three storeys. The main doorway has monolithic jambs, and steps lead up to a doorway in the middle floor in a lean-to with quoined angles. The windows are mullioned.	II
48 Towngate; 53.74925°N 2.02106°W	—	Early 19th century	A stone house with a stone slate roof and two storeys. The doorway has monolithic jambs, above it is a single window, and to the right is a two-storey segmental bay window. At the rear is a three-light chamfered mullioned window.	II
13, 16, 18, 20 and 22 West Laithe; 53.74808°N 2.02179°W		Early 19th century	A row of five stone cottages with quoins, and a stone slate roof that has a coped gable with kneelers on the left. There are two storeys, and each cottage has one bay, a doorway, and mullioned windows.	II
Barn south of Bents Knoll; 53.77151°N 2.05025°W	—	Early 19th century	The barn is in stone and has a stone slate roof. On the front is an arched cart entry with a keystone, above which is a Venetian window with an impost and a false keystone. The cart entry is flanked by doorways. The rear is similar, but with a rectangular window over the cart entry. In the gables are rectangular vents and owl holes.	II
Bridge at Blake Dean; 53.77835°N 2.06467°W		Early 19th century (probable)	The bridge carries Widdop Road over Graining Water. It is in stone and consists of a single segmental arch. The bridge has a band, a parapet with large copings, and abutments with piers.	II
Broadstone Cottages; 53.75512°N 2.05903°W	—	Early 19th century	A row of stone cottages with quoins, and a slate roof with coped gables and kneelers. There are two storeys and four bays. The doorways have tie-stone jambs and the windows are mullioned. At the rear is a five-light window in each bay.	II
Church Yard Bottom; 53.74894°N 2.02116°W		Early 19th century	A pair of cottages, later combined, the building is in stone with quoins, an eaves band, shaped gutter brackets, and a stone slate roof. There are two storeys at the front, three storeys at the rear, and two bays. The windows have flat-faced mullions and projecting sills.	II
Gibson's Bridge; 53.76488°N 2.04243°W		Early 19th century	Originally a toll bridge, it carries a road over the Hebden Water. The bridge is in stone, and consists of a single segmental arch. The bridge has voussoirs, and a parapet with large stone copings. On an adjacent cottage is a board recording the toll charges.	II
Guide post at junction with Northwell Lane; 53.75320°N 2.01782°W		Early 19th century (probable)	The guide post is at the junction of Lee Wood Road and Northwell Lane. It is an upright stone with two dressed faces and a pointed top. It is inscribed with pointing hands and the directions to Lee Wood Road, Hebden Bridge and Heptonstall.	II
New High Laithe Farmhouse and barn 53.77431°N 2.04935°W		Early 19th century	A laithe house in stone with quoins and a stone slate roof. The house has two storeys, two bays, a doorway with a sill-tie, and mullioned windows. The barn to the right has a segmental-arched cart entry, with a Venetian window above, and a doorway to the right.	II
Pinfold; 53.74955°N 2.01969°W		Early 19th century	The pinfold has been converted into a picnic area. It is a rectangular area enclosed by dry stone walls with shaped copings. At the southwest corner is an entrance with monolithic jambs and lintel.	II
Barn east of Widdop Gate; 53.77669°N 2.05322°W	—	Early 19th century	The barn is in stone and has a stone slate roof with coped gables and kneelers. It contains a semicircular-arched cart entry, a doorway with tie-stone jambs, and arrow-slit vents.	II
The Vicarage; 53.74899°N 2.02227°W	—	c. 1826	The vicarage is in stone with quoins, an eaves band, and a stone slate roof with coped gables and kneelers. There are two storeys, a symmetrical front of three bays, and a two-bay extension to the left. The central doorway has monolithic jambs, and the windows are sashes. At the rear is a doorway with tie-stone jambs, mullioned windows, and a semicircular-arched stair window with an impost block and a keystone.	II
Workhouse Farmhouse and barn 53.76340°N 2.07939°W	—	1828	A laithe house in stone, that has a stone slate roof with coped gables. There are two storeys, the windows are mullioned, and they include a seven-light window on the front. The barn has an arched cart entry, with a Venetian window above, and a doorway. In the right return is an inscribed datestone.	II
Old High Laithe Farmhouse; 53.77465°N 2.04923°W	—	1829	The house is in stone with quoins and a stone slate roof. There are two storeys and two bays. In the centre is a doorway with tie-stone-jambs, and above it is an inscribed and dated plaque. The windows are mullioned, and to the right are two doorways.	II
14 Smithwell Lane; 53.74967°N 2.02250°W	—	c. 1830	A stone cottage that has a stone slate roof with a coped gable on the right. There are two storeys, and the cottage has one bay. In the centre is a doorway flanked by windows, and in the upper floor is a five-light mullioned window. At the rear is a single sash window.	II
Old Royd Farmhouse and barn 53.77101°N 2.05009°W	—	1831	A laithe house with quoins, a stone slate roof, and two storeys. The house has paired doorways, one of which is blocked, and mullioned windows. The barn to the left has an arched cart entry, with a Venetian window above, and a doorway to the left. At the rear is a similar cart entry with an inscribed and dated plaque above.	II
Barn east of High Greenwood Farmhouse; 53.77301°N 2.04815°W	—	1834	The barn is in stone, and has a stone slate roof with coped gables and kneelers, and to the rear is a single aisle. It contains tall paired cart entries with elliptical arches and keystone, above it is a two-light window with arched heads and false keystones, and it is flanked by doorways. In the left return are rectangular vents and a dated owl hole. At the rear are three doorways and four windows.	II
17, 19, 21 and 23 Smithwell Lane; 53.74969°N 2.02319°W	—	c. 1835	A row of four stone cottages with quoins and a stone slate roof. There are two storeys and each house has one bay. The windows are mullioned, and most cottages have windows of five lights in the ground floor and six lights in the upper floor.	II
Cottages northeast of Broadstone Farmhouse; 53.75485°N 2.05925°W	—	Early to mid-19th century	A pair of workers' cottages in stone with a stone slate roof, two storeys and two bays. On the front are mullioned windows, and at the rear are two doorways with tie-stone jambs.	II
Gibson Mill; 53.76513°N 2.04240°W		Early to mid-19th century	A watermill, originally used for cotton spinning, it is in stone with quoins, bands, and a stone slate roof. There are three storeys and attic, a front of eight bays, three bays at the sides, and six bays at the rear. The windows have plain surrounds, on the front is a segmental-arched cart entry, and in the right return is a taking-in door. At the northeast corner is a rectangular tapering chimney.	II
St Thomas' Church; 53.74844°N 2.02215°W		1850–54	The church is in stone with a slate roof, and is in Perpendicular style. It consists of a nave with a clerestory, north and south aisles, north and south porches, a chancel with chapels, and a west tower. The tower has three stages, angle buttresses, a north door, a west window, and a richly embattled parapet with tall pinnacles. The buttresses to the nave are surmounted by gargoyles, and those of the clerestory and at the east end rise to crocketed pinnacles. The parapets along the sides of the church are embattled, and there is a cross between the nave and the chancel. The gabled porches have pointed doorways and hood moulds with carved faces.	II*
Former Sunday School; 53.75485°N 2.03706°W		c. 1863	The former Sunday school is in stone, with broad quoin pilasters, bracketed eaves, and a pedimented gabled front. There is a single storey, and on the front is a pedimented gabled porch with quoin pilasters, containing a semicircular-arched entrance with an impost and keystone. Flanking the porch, and along the sides, are tall semicircular-arched windows with keystones. In the gable, which is coped, is an inscribed plaque that is flanked by vents.	II
Valve tower, Widdop Reservoir; 53.78989°N 2.09974°W	—	1872–78	The valve tower, designed by John La Trobe Bateman in Egyptian style, is in stone with a bitumen roof. It has a square plan, with tapering sides and a projecting double cornice. The doorway has monolithic jambs, and on the corners are tapering pilasters acting as buttresses to the frieze. On the sides and at the rear ware rectangular windows with plain surrounds.	II
Telephone kiosk 53.74864°N 2.02081°W	—	1935	A K6 type telephone kiosk designed by Giles Gilbert Scott. Constructed in cast iron with a square plan and a dome, it has three unperforated crowns in the top panels.	II
