= Listed buildings in Saltaire =

Saltaire is a model village in Shipley, a ward in the metropolitan borough of the City of Bradford, West Yorkshire, England. The village contains 93 listed buildings that are recorded in the National Heritage List for England. Of these, one is listed at Grade I, the highest of the three grades, four are at Grade II*, the middle grade, and the others are at Grade II, the lowest grade. In 1850 Titus Salt started to build a textile mill, known as Salt's Mill, alongside the Leeds and Liverpool Canal and then developed the model village to house and serve its workers. This included housing, shops, and community buildings, all of which are listed. The architects for the entire scheme, including later mills, were the Bradford architects Lockwood and Mawson. All the listed buildings built between 1850 and 1870 were designed by them. The later listed buildings are a tram shed, a war memorial and a telephone kiosk.

== Key ==
Grade	Criteria
I	Buildings of exceptional interest, sometimes considered to be internationally important
II*	Particularly important buildings of more than special interest
II	Buildings of national importance and special interest

== Buildings ==
Name and location	Photograph	Date	Notes	Grade
Main block and sheds, Salts Mill; 53.83888°N 1.78781°W		1850–53	A mill complex, it consists of a main block with a T-shaped plan and lower sheds in the angles. The building is in stone with rusticated and pilastered quoins, string courses, a deep bracketed eaves cornice, a parapet over the centre bays, and a Welsh slate roof. The main range has four storeys and a basement, sides of 60 bays, and is 545 feet (166 m) long. On the sides are two projecting square towers surmounted by belvederes. Attached to each tower are three bays containing segmental-headed entrances with voussoirs. The range at right angles has 25 bays and ends in a five-storey twelve-bay block overlooking the canal, and containing loading bays with segmental pediments, and seven round-arched openings at canal level. Also on this front are a four-storey 23-bay block, and a 22-bay shed.	II*
Entrance block, Salts Mill; 53.83895°N 1.78908°W		1851–53	The entrance and office block in Italianate style, is in stone with a deep bracketed cornice and a hipped Welsh slate roof. There are two storeys and a basement, and a front of 21 bays. The central block and the outer blocks, each of three bays, project. In the centre is a giant portal with a round-arched entrance, surmounted by a tall turret containing an open round-headed arch with a segmental pediment and flanked by scrolls. The adjacent bays contain canted bay windows. Elsewhere, the windows in the ground floor have round-arched heads with rusticated voussoirs, and the upper floor windows have segmental heads.	II*
Chimney, Salts Mill; 53.83791°N 1.78686°W		1851–53	The chimney at the southeast corner of the site is in stone, it is tall, square and tapering. On the base are rusticated quoins, above which is a cornice on square brackets. The top is plain apart from slit-like recesses.	II
Former dining room, Salts Mill; 53.83866°N 1.78982°W		1853	The dining room, later part of Shipley College, is in stone with a hipped Welsh slate roof, and has a single storey and a symmetrical front of seven bays. In the centre is a doorway with an architrave, and the outer bays contain windows flanked by pilasters carrying a full entablature with a bracketed cornice. Over the centre bay are the Salt coat of arms with scrolled support, an open pediment at the top, and a festooned base. At the rear of the building are three gables, each with a semicircular window, and along the left side are five tall windows with cornices. There are cast iron railings with cast iron piers in front of the building, and flanking the steps leading down to the railway station.	II
1–13 Amelia Street, 10 Caroline Street, and 10 Albert Terrace; 53.83821°N 1.79130°W		By 1854	A terrace of houses in stone, with paired stone gutter brackets and a Welsh slate roof. The end houses project and have three storeys, and the other houses have two storeys. Each house has one bay, and there are two bays in the returns. The end houses have sill bands, hipped roofs, and they contain doorways and ground floor windows with round-arched heads, archivolts, impost bands, and keystones. The other houses have doorways and windows with plain surrounds, and some inserted windows.	II
14–22 Amelia Street and 11 Albert Terrace; 53.83830°N 1.79151°W		By 1854	A terrace of houses in stone, with paired stone gutter brackets and a Welsh slate roof. The left end house projects and has three storeys, and the other houses have two storeys. Each house has one bay, and there are two bays in the left return. Most houses have a plain entrance, a single-light window in each floor, and some have inserted windows. The house at the left end has sill bands, a hipped roof, a doorway and ground floor windows with round-arched heads, archivolts, impost bands, and keystones.	II
6–14 Edward Street and 14 Albert Terrace; 53.83829°N 1.79174°W		By 1854	A terrace of houses in stone, with paired stone gutter brackets and a Welsh slate roof. There are two storeys, each house has one bay, and most houses have a plain entrance and a single-light window in each floor. The house at the left end has a hipped roof, two bays on the return, and in the ground floor it contains a doorway with a fanlight and windows, all with round-arched heads, archivolts, impost bands, and keystones.	II
15–27 Edward Street, 12 Caroline Street, and 15 Albert Terrace; 53.83827°N 1.79198°W		By 1854	A terrace of houses in stone, with paired stone gutter brackets and a Welsh slate roof. There are two storeys, each house has one bay, and most houses have a plain entrance, a single-light window in each floor, and some have inserted windows. The end houses have sill bands and hipped roofs, and they contain doorways and ground floor windows with round-arched heads, archivolts, impost bands, and keystones.	II
1–13 Fanny Street, 14 Caroline Street, and 18 Albert Terrace; 53.83824°N 1.79223°W		By 1854	A terrace of houses in stone, with paired stone gutter brackets and a Welsh slate roof. There are two storeys, each house has one bay, and most houses have a plain entrance, a single-light window in each floor, and some have inserted windows. The end houses have sill bands and hipped roofs, and they contain doorways and ground floor windows with round-arched heads, archivolts, impost bands, and keystones.	II
14–27 Fanny Street, 15 Caroline Street and 19 Albert Terrace; 53.83831°N 1.79244°W		By 1854	A terrace of houses in stone, with paired stone gutter brackets and a Welsh slate roof. There are two storeys, each house has one bay, and most houses have a plain entrance, a single-light window in each floor, and some have inserted windows. The end houses have sill bands and hipped roofs, and they contain doorways and ground floor windows with round-arched heads, archivolts, impost bands, and keystones.	II
27–37 George Street, 6 Caroline Street and 6 Albert Terrace; 53.83813°N 1.79078°W		c. 1854	A terrace of stone houses with sill bands, wooden gutter brackets, and a Welsh slate roof. The end houses and No. 31 have three storeys with hipped roofs, and the other houses have two storeys. Each house has two bays apart from the end houses which have one, the returns have two bays, and there are two rear wings. The doorways with fanlights and the ground floor windows have round-arched heads with archivolts, impost bands, and keystones, and the upper floor windows have flat heads.	II
38–47 George Street, 7 Caroline Street and 7 Albert Terrace; 53.83817°N 1.79107°W		c. 1854	A terrace of stone houses with sill bands, wooden gutter brackets, and a Welsh slate roof. The end houses and No. 43 have three storeys with hipped roofs, and the other houses have two storeys. Each house has two bays apart from the end houses which have one, and the returns have two bays. The doorways with fanlights and the ground floor windows have round-arched heads with archivolts, impost bands, and keystones, and the upper floor windows have flat heads.	II
1–14 Herbert Street, 18 Caroline Street and 22 Albert Terrace; 53.83832°N 1.79267°W		By 1854	A terrace of houses in stone, with paired stone gutter brackets and a Welsh slate roof. There are two storeys, each house has one bay, and most houses have a plain entrance, a single-light window in each floor, and some have inserted windows. The end houses have sill bands and hipped roofs, and they contain doorways and ground floor windows with round-arched heads, archivolts, impost bands, and keystones.	II
15–28 Herbert Street, 19 and 20 Caroline Street and 23 Albert Terrace; 53.83836°N 1.79289°W		By 1854	A terrace of houses in stone, some are rendered, with paired stone gutter brackets and a Welsh slate roof. There are two storeys, each house has one bay, and most houses have a plain entrance, a single-light window in each floor, and some have inserted windows. The end houses have sill bands and hipped roofs, and they contain doorways and ground floor windows with round-arched heads, archivolts, impost bands, and keystones.	II
1–11 Victoria Road and railings 53.83802°N 1.78988°W		By 1854	A terrace of shops in stone, with rusticated quoins, a bracketed eaves cornice, and a Welsh slate roof. The middle block has three storeys, the flanking blocks have two storeys, each block has seven bays, on the corners are curved single bays. In the ground floor are shop fronts with original surrounds, the upper floor contains windows with round-arched heads, archivolts, impost bands, and keystones, and in the top floor of the middle block are windows with segmental heads and sill bands. At the north end is a length of cast iron railings that have square piers with pyramidal caps.	II
1–11 William Henry Street, 1 and 2 Caroline Street and 1 and 2 Albert Terrace; 53.83809°N 1.79019°W		c. 1854	A terrace of stone houses with sill bands, wooden gutter brackets, and a Welsh slate roof. The end houses and No. 4 have three storeys with hipped roofs, and the other houses have two storeys. Each house has two bays apart from the end houses which have one, the returns have two bays, and there are two rear wings. The doorways with fanlights and the ground floor windows have round-arched heads with archivolts, impost bands, and keystones, and the upper floor windows have flat heads.	II
12–22 William Henry Street, 3 Caroline Street and 3 Albert Terrace; 53.83812°N 1.79049°W		c. 1854	A terrace of stone houses with sill bands, wooden gutter brackets, and a Welsh slate roof. The end houses and No. 19 have three storeys with hipped roofs, and the other houses have two storeys. Each house has two bays apart from the end houses which have one, the returns have two bays, and there are two rear wings. The doorways with fanlights and the ground floor windows have round-arched heads with archivolts, impost bands, and keystones, and the upper floor windows have flat heads.	II
1, 2, 3 and 4 Victoria Terrace and adjoining buildings 53.83922°N 1.78976°W		1855–68	Stables and carriage houses later converted into houses. They are in stone with hipped Welsh slate roofs, and consist of a single-storey entrance range with seven bays, four two-storey houses at the rear giving an L-shaped plan, and a carriage house range across the back of the courtyard. The front range has a square-headed entrance flanked by three panels on each side, separated by pilasters carrying a full entablature and a bracketed cornice. The houses have sash windows, and in the carriage house are three large entrances and two oculi above.	II
Congregational Church and Salt Mausoleum; 53.83909°N 1.79094°W		1856–59	The church and mausoleum are in Italianate style. They are in stone, the church with a Welsh slate roof, and the mausoleum with a lead roof. The church consists of a nave with a portico at the east end. The portico is semicircular, with Corinthian columns carrying a dentilled and modillioned entablature. Above it is a round tower with clock faces and oculi, and it is surmounted by engaged columns supporting a dome. Along the sides of the church are large square-headed windows and Corinthian pilasters. The mausoleum is to the south, it is square and has a domed roof.	I
1–22 Ada Street; 53.83734°N 1.79177°W		By 1857	A terrace of stone houses with a Welsh slate roof and two storeys. The end houses project, and have two bays on the front and on the returns, sill bands, bracketed gutters, and hipped roofs. The doorways and ground floor windows have round-arched heads with archivolts, impost bands, and keystones. The other houses have one bay each, doorways and windows with plain surrounds, and some inserted windows.	II
23–44 Ada Street; 53.83730°N 1.79153°W		By 1857	A terrace of houses in stone, some are rendered, with a Welsh slate roof and two storeys. The end houses project, and have two bays on the front and on the returns, sill bands, bracketed gutters, and hipped roofs. The doorways and ground floor windows have round-arched heads with archivolts, impost bands, and keystones. The other houses have one bay each, doorways and windows with plain surrounds, and some inserted windows.	II
48–65 George Street; 53.83734°N 1.79130°W		By 1857	A terrace of houses in stone with bracketed gutters and a hipped Welsh slate roof. No. 48 and 53 have three storeys, the others have two, each house has two bays, and Nos. 48, 53, 59 and 65 project slightly. The doorways and ground floor windows have round-arched heads with archivolts, impost bands, and keystones, and the upper floor windows have square heads.	II
1–22 Helen Street; 53.83732°N 1.79223°W		By 1857	A terrace of stone houses with a Welsh slate roof and two storeys. The end houses project, and have two bays on the front and on the returns, sill bands, bracketed gutters, and hipped roofs. The doorways and ground floor windows have round-arched heads with archivolts, impost bands, and keystones. The other houses have one bay each, doorways and windows with plain surrounds, and some inserted windows.	II
23–44 Helen Street; 53.83741°N 1.79197°W		By 1857	A terrace of houses in stone, some are rendered, with a Welsh slate roof and two storeys. The end houses project, and have two bays on the front and on the returns, sill bands, bracketed gutters, and hipped roofs. The doorways and ground floor windows have round-arched heads with archivolts, impost bands, and keystones. The other houses have one bay each, doorways and windows with plain surrounds, and some inserted windows.	II
1–22 Mary Street; 53.83736°N 1.79269°W		By 1857	A terrace of stone houses, some rendered, with a Welsh slate roof and two storeys. The end houses project, and have two bays on the front and on the returns, sill bands, bracketed gutters, and hipped roofs. The doorways and ground floor windows have round-arched heads with archivolts, impost bands, and keystones. The other houses have one bay each, doorways and windows with plain surrounds, and some inserted windows.	II
23–44 Mary Street; 53.83748°N 1.79243°W		By 1857	A terrace of stone houses, some rendered, with a Welsh slate roof and two storeys. The end houses project, and have two bays on the front and on the returns, sill bands, bracketed gutters, and hipped roofs. The doorways and ground floor windows have round-arched heads with archivolts, impost bands, and keystones. The other houses have one bay each, doorways and windows with plain surrounds, and some inserted windows.	II
1–22 Whitlam Street, 30 Titus Street and 21 Caroline Street; 53.83754°N 1.79310°W		By 1857	A terrace of stone houses with a Welsh slate roof and two storeys. The end houses project, and have two bays on the front and on the returns, sill bands, bracketed gutters, and hipped roofs. The doorways and ground floor windows have round-arched heads with archivolts, impost bands, and keystones. The other houses have one bay each, doorways and windows with plain surrounds, and some inserted windows.	II
23–44 Whitlam Street; 53.83744°N 1.79290°W		By 1857	A terrace of stone houses with a Welsh slate roof and two storeys. The end houses project, and have two bays on the front and on the returns, sill bands, bracketed gutters, and hipped roofs. The doorways and ground floor windows have round-arched heads with archivolts, impost bands, and keystones. The other houses have one bay each, doorways and windows with plain surrounds, and some inserted windows.	II
Railings and piers to front of Saltaire Mills; 53.83874°N 1.78940°W	—	c. 1860–70	The railings in front of the mills are in cast iron, and have square piers with pyramidal caps. In front of the entrance are two stone piers each with a moulded cornice.	II
Railings between Victoria Road and Albert Road; 53.83855°N 1.79165°W	—	c. 1860–70	The railings that run along the north side of Albert Terrace are in cast iron, and have square piers with pyramidal caps.	II
Railings, gates and piers, Congregational Church; 53.83898°N 1.78964°W	—	c. 1860–70	At the entrance to the churchyard are two round stone piers, each with a pedestal and a cap. From these, square arcaded railings curve to central iron gates with piers and ball finials.	II
1–9 Constance Street; 53.83658°N 1.79231°W		By 1861	A terrace of stone houses with a sill band, shaped gutter brackets, and a Welsh slate roof. There are two storeys, each house has two bays, the end houses projecting under gables. The doorways with fanlights and the ground floor windows have round-arched heads with archivolts, impost bands, and keystones. In the upper floor of the end houses are triple windows with round-arched lights, and the other upper floor windows have flat heads.	II
10–16 Constance Street; 53.83667°N 1.79317°W		By 1861	A terrace of stone houses with a sill band, shaped gutter brackets, and a Welsh slate roof. There are two storeys, each house has two bays, the end houses projecting under gables. The doorways with fanlights and the ground floor windows have round-arched heads with archivolts, impost bands, and keystones. In the upper floor of the end houses are triple windows with round-arched lights, and the other upper floor windows have flat heads.	II
17–23 Constance Street; 53.83653°N 1.79323°W		By 1861	A terrace of stone houses with a sill band, shaped gutter brackets, and a Welsh slate roof. There are two storeys, each house has two bays, the end houses projecting under gables. The doorways with fanlights and the ground floor windows have round-arched heads with archivolts, impost bands, and keystones. In the upper floor of the end houses are triple windows with round-arched lights, and the other upper floor windows have flat heads.	II
24–32 Constance Street; 53.83644°N 1.79235°W		By 1861	A terrace of stone houses with a sill band, shaped gutter brackets, and a Welsh slate roof. There are two storeys, each house has two bays, the end houses projecting under gables. The doorways with fanlights and the ground floor windows have round-arched heads with archivolts, impost bands, and keystones. In the upper floor of the end houses are triple windows with round-arched lights, and the other upper floor windows have flat heads.	II
19–26 George Street and 48 and 49 Titus Street; 53.83642°N 1.79119°W		By 1861 (probable)	A terrace of stone houses with sill bands, moulded gutter brackets, and hipped Welsh slate roofs. The middle and end blocks have three storeys and the rest have two, and each house has two bays. The doorways with fanlights and the ground floor windows have cornices on long brackets. No. 48 Titus Street has a large blocked shop window.	II
1–9 Shirley Street; 53.83630°N 1.79238°W		By 1861	A terrace of stone houses with a sill band, shaped gutter brackets, and a Welsh slate roof. There are two storeys, each house has two bays, the end houses projecting under gables. The doorways with fanlights and the ground floor windows have round-arched heads with archivolts, impost bands, and keystones. In the upper floor of the end houses are triple windows with round-arched lights, and the other upper floor windows have flat heads.	II
10–16 Shirley Street; 53.83639°N 1.79323°W		By 1861	A terrace of stone houses with a sill band, shaped gutter brackets, and a Welsh slate roof. There are two storeys, each house has two bays, the end houses projecting under gables. The doorways with fanlights and the ground floor windows have round-arched heads with archivolts, impost bands, and keystones. In the upper floor of the end houses are triple windows with round-arched lights, and the other upper floor windows have flat heads.	II
17–23 Shirley Street; 53.83625°N 1.79326°W		By 1861	A terrace of stone houses with a sill band, shaped gutter brackets, and a Welsh slate roof. There are two storeys, each house has two bays, the end houses projecting under gables. No. 23 has a shop front with a cornice on long brackets. The doorways with fanlights and the ground floor windows have round-arched heads with archivolts, impost bands, and keystones. In the upper floor of the end houses are triple windows with round-arched lights, and the other upper floor windows have flat heads.	II
24–32 Shirley Street and 107 Saltaire Road; 53.83616°N 1.79243°W		By 1861	A terrace of stone houses with a sill band, shaped gutter brackets, and a Welsh slate roof. There are two storeys, each house has two bays, the end houses projecting under gables and each containing a shop front under a cornice on brackets. The doorways with fanlights and the ground floor windows have round-arched heads with archivolts, impost bands, and keystones. In the upper floor of the end houses are triple windows with round-arched lights, and the other upper floor windows have flat heads. At the rear of No. 32 is a single-storey extension with a glazed front and a curved corner.	II
12–21 Titus Street; 53.83676°N 1.79078°W		By 1861	A terrace of stone houses with a sill band, square gutter brackets, and a Welsh slate roof. There are two storeys, each house has two bays, the end houses projecting under gables. No. 21 has a shop front in the ground floor. The doorways with fanlights and the ground floor windows have round-arched heads with archivolts, impost bands, and keystones. In the upper floor of the end houses are triple windows with round-arched lights, and the other upper floor windows have flat heads. In the left return are two bays with blind windows.	II
31–37 Titus Street; 53.83681°N 1.79311°W		By 1861	A terrace of stone houses with a sill band, shaped gutter brackets, and a Welsh slate roof. There are two storeys, each house has two bays, the end houses projecting under gables. No. 37 has a shop front in the ground floor with a cornice on long brackets. The doorways with fanlights and the ground floor windows have round-arched heads with archivolts, impost bands, and keystones. In the upper floor of the end houses are triple windows with round-arched lights, and the other upper floor windows have flat heads.	II
38–46 Titus Street; 53.83673°N 1.79226°W		By 1861	A terrace of stone houses with a sill band, shaped gutter brackets, and a Welsh slate roof. There are two storeys, each house has two bays, the end houses projecting under gables. The end houses have a shop front in the ground floor with a cornice on long brackets, that of No. 38 converted into a window. The doorways with fanlights and the ground floor windows have round-arched heads with archivolts, impost bands, and keystones. In the upper floor of the end houses are triple windows with round-arched lights, and the other upper floor windows have square heads.	II
New Mill, Salts Mill; 53.83958°N 1.78832°W		1865–68	The mill building is in stone with rusticated pilaster-quoins and a Welsh slate roof. It consists of two four-storey blocks at right angles, lower sheds and an entrance lodge. The larger block has 28 bays and sides of four bays, and the other block has 14 bays. The windows are industrial casements. In the angle is a chimney consisting of a square tower with paired round-arched sunk panels, above which are round-arched louvred openings with hood moulds. At the top is a deep cornice and an octagonal lantern with round-arched openings.	II
The Old Bank; 53.83570°N 1.79394°W		By 1868	A stone house, later used for other purposes, with a sill band, shaped gutter brackets, and a Welsh slate roof. There are two storeys and an attic, and a symmetrical front of three bays. In the centre is a round-arched porch with pilaster jambs, above which is an arch with coloured voussoirs, containing two round-headed lights with a colonnette between and a blind circle above in the tympanum, and a gabled dormer. The outer bays contain sash windows. The right return has a projecting gabled wing on the left containing a canted bay window, over which is a similar two-light window to that on the front, and an attic window. To the right is a flat-roofed porch.	II
3, 5, 7 and 9 Albert Road; 53.83597°N 1.79385°W		By 1868	A terrace of stone houses with a sill band, and a hipped Welsh slate roof. There are two storeys and each house has two bays. In the centre are paired doorways with pilaster jambs, a central engaged colonnette, a frieze and a cornice. These are flanked by two-light windows with a cornice, and in the upper floor are single-light windows. The entrances are in recessed outer bays, and inside these are projecting gabled bays each containing a two-light window with a cornice, and above is an arch with coloured voussoirs, containing two round-headed lights with a colonnette between and a blind circle above in the tympanum.	II
11 and 13 Albert Road; 53.83625°N 1.79381°W		By 1868	A pair of mirror-image stone houses with moulded gutter brackets and a hipped Welsh slate roof. There are two storeys and each house has two bays. The centre bays project and have gables with bracketed copings. In the ground floor of each house is a two-light window, and above is an arch with coloured voussoirs, containing two round-headed lights with a colonnette between and a blind circle above in the tympanum. On the sides are entrances and single-light windows.	II
15, 17, 18 and 19 Albert Road; 53.83656°N 1.79370°W		By 1868	A terrace of stone houses with a sill band, and a hipped Welsh slate roof. There are two storeys and each house has two bays. In the centre are paired doorways with pilaster jambs, a central engaged colonnette, a frieze and a cornice. These are flanked by two-light windows with a cornice, and in the upper floor are single-light windows. The entrances are in recessed outer bays, and inside these are projecting gabled bays each containing a two-light window with a cornice, and above is an arch with coloured voussoirs, containing two round-headed lights with a colonnette between and a blind circle above in the tympanum.	II
23 and 25 Albert Road; 53.83682°N 1.79364°W		By 1868	A pair of mirror-image stone houses with moulded gutter brackets and a hipped Welsh slate roof. There are two storeys and each house has two bays. The centre bays project and have gables with bracketed copings. In the ground floor of each house is a two-light window, and above is an arch with coloured voussoirs, containing two round-headed lights with a colonnette between and a blind circle above in the tympanum. On the sides are entrances and single-light windows.	II
27–61 Albert Road; 53.83748°N 1.79344°W		By 1868	A terrace of houses, they are in stone with sill bands, shaped stone gutter brackets, and a Welsh slate roof. The middle block of six houses have three storeys, the others have two, and each house has two bays. The end houses of the middle block and the end houses of the terrace project slightly and are gabled. The doorways with fanlights and the ground floor windows have round-arched heads with archivolts, impost bands, and keystones, and the windows in the upper floors have square heads. The gabled houses each has an arch with coloured voussoirs, containing two round-headed lights with a colonnette between and a blind circle above in the tympanum.	II
63 and 65 Albert Road; 53.83808°N 1.79331°W		By 1868	A pair of mirror-image stone houses with moulded gutter brackets and a hipped Welsh slate roof. There are two storeys and each house has two bays. The centre bays project and have gables with bracketed copings. In the ground floor of each house is a two-light window, and above is an arch with coloured voussoirs, containing two round-headed lights with a colonnette between and a blind circle above in the tympanum. On the sides are entrances and single-light windows.	II
67, 69, 71 and 73 Albert Road; 53.83835°N 1.79323°W		By 1868	A terrace of stone houses with a sill band, and a hipped Welsh slate roof. There are two storeys and each house has two bays. In the centre are paired doorways with pilaster jambs, a central engaged colonnette, a frieze and a cornice. These are flanked by two-light windows with a cornice, and in the upper floor are single-light windows. The entrances are in recessed outer bays, and inside these are projecting gabled bays each containing a two-light window with a cornice, and above is an arch with coloured voussoirs, containing two round-headed lights with a colonnette between and a blind circle above in the tympanum.	II
75 and 77 Albert Road; 53.83862°N 1.79317°W		By 1868	A pair of mirror-image stone houses with moulded gutter brackets and a hipped Welsh slate roof. There are two storeys and each house has two bays. The centre bays project and have gables with bracketed copings. In the ground floor of each house is a two-light window, and above is an arch with coloured voussoirs, containing two round-headed lights with a colonnette between and a blind circle above in the tympanum. On the sides are entrances and single-light windows.	II
51–97 Bingley Road; 53.83529°N 1.79290°W		By 1868	A terrace of houses and shops, they are in stone with bracketed eaves and Welsh slate roofs. They have two or three storeys, and each building has two bays. The end and two intermediate blocks project and have bracketed gables, and Nos. 61 and 63 have hipped roofs. In the ground floor are shop fronts, some original, but most modern. The upper floors contain windows with round-arched heads with archivolts, impost bands, and keystones, those in the gabled blocks are paired, and in Nos. 61 and 63 they have segmental heads.	II
30–39 Caroline Street; 53.83761°N 1.79058°W		By 1868	A terrace of houses, they are in stone, partly rendered, with a sill band, stone gutter brackets, and a Welsh slate roof. There are two storeys, and each house has two bays. The end houses project under gables, and in the ground floor of No. 30 is a shop window. The other ground floor openings have round-arched heads with archivolts, impost bands, and keystones. In the upper floor of the end houses are triple windows with round-arched lights, and the other upper floor windows have flat heads.	II
40 Caroline Street; 53.83757°N 1.79013°W		By 1868	A stone house with a sill band, a Welsh slate roof, and a bracketed gable on the front. The doorway with a fanlight and the ground floor window have round-arched heads with archivolts, impost bands, and keystones. The upper floor contains a triple window with round-arched lights and keystones.	II
41–50 Caroline Street; 53.83748°N 1.78922°W		By 1868	A terrace of houses, they are in stone with a sill band, stone gutter brackets, and a Welsh slate roof. There are two storeys, and each house has two bays, the end houses projecting under bracketed gables. The ground floor openings have round-arched heads with archivolts, impost bands, and keystones. In the upper floor of the end houses are triple windows with round-arched lights, and the other upper floor windows have square heads.	II
1–5 Daisy Place; 53.83604°N 1.79265°W		By 1868	A terrace of houses and a shop, they are in stone, with shaped gutter brackets, and a Welsh slate roof. There are two storeys, each house has two bays, apart from No. 1 which has two further bays recessed on the right. Nos. 1 and 5 are gabled and contain a shop window with a cornice on long brackets. The other ground floor openings have round-arched heads with archivolts, impost bands, and keystones. In the upper floor of Nos. 1 and 5 are round arched windows, the other upper floor windows have flat heads. In the right gable end is a canted bay window with paired round-arched windows above.	II
1–12 Dove Street; 53.83550°N 1.79224°W		By 1868	A terrace of houses, they are in stone with a sill band, moulded stone gutter brackets, and a Welsh slate roof. There are two storeys, each house has two bays, the end houses projecting under bracketed gables. The doorways with fanlights and the ground floor windows have round-arched heads with archivolts, impost bands, and keystones. In the upper floor of the end houses are triple windows with round-arched lights, and the other upper floor windows have flat heads.	II
13–21 Dove Street; 53.83557°N 1.79299°W		By 1868	A terrace of houses, they are in stone with a sill band, square stone gutter brackets, and a Welsh slate roof. There are two storeys, each house has two bays, and No. 21 has a recessed bay to the right. The doorways with fanlights and the ground floor windows have round-arched heads with archivolts, impost bands, and keystones, and No. 21 has blind windows. In the right gable end is a canted bay window with paired round-arched windows above.	II
22–28 Dove Street; 53.83547°N 1.79325°W		By 1868	A terrace of houses, they are in stone with square stone gutter brackets, and a Welsh slate roof. There are two storeys, and each house has two bays. The doorways with fanlights and the ground floor windows have round-arched heads with archivolts, impost bands, and keystones. In the upper floor the windows have square heads, and in No. 22 they are paired. In the right gable end is a canted bay window with paired round-arched windows above.	II
29–40 Dove Street; 53.83535°N 1.79229°W		By 1868	A terrace of houses, they are in stone with a sill band, moulded stone gutter brackets, and a Welsh slate roof. There are two storeys, each house has two bays, the end houses projecting under bracketed gables. The doorways with fanlights and the ground floor windows have round-arched heads with archivolts, impost bands, and keystones. In the upper floor of the end houses are triple windows with round-arched lights, and the other upper floor windows have flat heads.	II
1–5 Fern Place; 53.83589°N 1.79181°W		By 1868	A terrace of houses and a shop, they are in stone with a Welsh slate roof. There are two storeys, and each house has two bays. No. 1 on the right is recessed, and Nos. 2 and 5 project and are gabled. No. 5 contains a shop window and No. 1 is entered from the right return. The other ground floor openings have round-arched heads with archivolts, impost bands, and keystones. In the upper floor of Nos. 2 and 5 are round arched windows, the other upper floor windows have flat heads. In the right gable end is a canted bay window with paired round-arched windows above.	II
2–18 George Street and 49 Bingley Road; 53.83558°N 1.79138°W		By 1868	A terrace of houses, they are in stone with sill bands, shaped stone gutter brackets, and a Welsh slate roof. The middle block of six houses have three storeys, the others have two, and each house has two bays. The end houses of the middle block and the end houses of the terrace project slightly and are gabled. The doorways with fanlights and the ground floor windows have round-arched heads with archivolts, impost bands, and keystones, and the windows in the upper floors have square heads. The gabled houses each has an arch with coloured voussoirs, containing two round-headed lights with a colonnette between and a blind circle above in the tympanum.	II
1, 2, 3, 4, 5 and 6, Harold Place; 53.83633°N 1.78960°W		By 1868	A terrace of houses, they are in stone with a band, stone gutter brackets, and a Welsh slate roof with coped gables. There are two storeys, and each house has two bays. No. 1 on the right is recessed, and Nos. 2 and 6 project and have hipped roofs. The doorways have fanlights, the ground floor windows have sunken panels under the sills, and all have cornices on long brackets. In the right return is a canted bay window with a cornice and blocking course, and the upper floor windows are round-arched.	II
1–6 Higher School Street; 53.83688°N 1.79046°W		By 1868	A terrace of houses, they are in stone with a sill band and a Welsh slate roof. There are two storeys, each house has two bays, No. 6 projecting under a bracketed gable. The doorways with fanlights and the ground floor windows have round-arched heads with archivolts, impost bands, and keystones. In the upper floor, No. 6 has a window with three round-arched lights, and the other upper floor windows have flat heads.	II
1–11 Jane Street; 53.83579°N 1.79218°W		By 1868	A terrace of houses, they are in stone with a sill band, stone gutter brackets, and a Welsh slate roof. There are two storeys, each house has two bays, the end houses projecting under bracketed gables. The doorways with fanlights and the ground floor windows have round-arched heads with archivolts, impost bands, and keystones. In the upper floor of the end houses are triple windows with round-arched lights, and the other upper floor windows have flat heads.	II
12, 13, 14 and 15 Jane Street; 53.83570°N 1.79283°W		By 1868	A row of four houses at the end of a terrace, they are in stone with a sill band, square stone gutter brackets, and a Welsh slate roof. There are two storeys, and each house has two bays. No. 13 projects and is gabled, and No. 12 is recessed with a porch in the angle. The doorways with fanlights and the ground floor windows have round-arched heads with archivolts, impost bands, and keystones, and the upper floor windows have flat heads. In the right return is a canted bay window, and the upper floor windows are round-arched.	II
16–27 Jane Street; 53.83566°N 1.79237°W		By 1868	A terrace of houses, they are in stone with a sill band, stone gutter brackets, and a Welsh slate roof. There are two storeys, each house has two bays, the end houses projecting under bracketed gables. The doorways with fanlights and the ground floor windows have round-arched heads with archivolts, impost bands, and keystones. In the upper floor of the end houses are triple windows with round-arched lights, and the other upper floor windows have flat heads.	II
1–7 Katherine Street; 53.83610°N 1.79330°W		By 1868	A terrace of houses, they are in stone with a sill band, shaped stone gutter brackets, and a Welsh slate roof. There are two storeys, each house has two bays, the end houses projecting and gabled. No. 1 has a partly blocked shop window containing a smaller flat-headed and with a cornice on long brackets. The doorways with fanlights and the other ground floor windows have round-arched heads with archivolts, impost bands, and keystones. In the upper floor of the end houses are triple windows with round-arched lights, and the other upper floor windows have flat heads.	II
8–14 Katherine Street; 53.83597°N 1.79343°W		By 1868	A terrace of houses, they are in stone with a sill band, shaped stone gutter brackets, and a Welsh slate roof. There are two storeys, each house has two bays, the end houses projecting and gabled. No. 14 has a shop window with a cornice on long brackets. The doorways with fanlights and the other ground floor windows have round-arched heads with archivolts, impost bands, and keystones. In the upper floor of the end houses are triple windows with round-arched lights, and the other upper floor windows have square heads.	II
1–10 Lockwood Street; 53.83734°N 1.78920°W		By 1868	A terrace of houses, they are in stone with a sill band, stone gutter brackets, and a Welsh slate roof. There are two storeys, each house has two bays, the end houses projecting under bracketed gables, and the returns have two bays. The doorways with fanlights and the ground floor windows have round-arched heads with archivolts, impost bands, and keystones. In the upper floor of the end houses are triple windows with round-arched lights, and the other upper floor windows have flat heads.	II
2–7 Lower School Street; 53.83744°N 1.79031°W		By 1868	A terrace of houses, they are in stone with a sill band and a Welsh slate roof. There are two storeys, each house has two bays, No. 7 projecting under a bracketed gable. The doorways with fanlights and the ground floor windows have round-arched heads with archivolts, impost bands, and keystones. In the upper floor, No. 7 has a window with three round-arched lights, and the other upper floor windows have square heads.	II
1–10 Mawson Street; 53.83677°N 1.78935°W		By 1868	A terrace of houses, they are in stone with a sill band, stone gutter brackets, and a Welsh slate roof. There are two storeys, each house has two bays, the end houses projecting under bracketed gables, and the returns have two bays. The doorways with fanlights and the ground floor windows have round-arched heads with archivolts, impost bands, and keystones. In the upper floor of the end houses are triple windows with round-arched lights, and the other upper floor windows have flat heads.	II
1, 2, 3 and 4 Myrtle Place; 53.83583°N 1.79347°W		By 1868	A terrace of houses, they are in stone with shaped gutter brackets and a Welsh slate roof. There are two storeys, two gables on the front, and each house has one or two bays. The doorways and the ground floor windows are round-arched with archivolts and keystones. The upper floor windows have flat heads, apart from those in the gables, which are round-arched. In the right gable end is a canted bay window.	II
1–10 Titus Street; 53.83662°N 1.78939°W		By 1868	A terrace of houses, they are in stone with a sill band, stone gutter brackets, and a Welsh slate roof. There are two storeys, each house has two bays, the end houses projecting under bracketed gables, and the returns have two bays. The doorways with fanlights and the ground floor windows have round-arched heads with archivolts, impost bands, and keystones. In the upper floor of the end houses are triple windows with round-arched lights, and the other upper floor windows have flat heads.	II
11 Titus Street; 53.83670°N 1.79036°W		By 1868	A stone house with a sill band, a Welsh slate roof, and a bracketed gable on the front. The doorway with a fanlight and the ground floor window have round-arched heads with archivolts, impost bands, and keystones. The upper floor contains a triple window with round-arched lights and keystones.	II
52–61 Titus Street; 53.83647°N 1.78947°W		By 1868	A terrace of houses, they are in stone with a sill band, stone gutter brackets, and a Welsh slate roof. There are two storeys, each house has two bays, and the end houses project slightly with bracketed gables. The doorways with fanlights and the ground floor windows have round-arched heads with archivolts, impost bands, and keystones. In the upper floor of the end houses are triple windows with round-arched lights, and the other upper floor windows have flat heads.	II
12, 13 and 14 Victoria Road and 1 Lower School Street; 53.83750°N 1.78999°W		By 1868	A row of shops, they are in stone with rusticated quoins, a deep entablature between the floors, deep bracketed eaves, and a Welsh slate roof. There are two storeys and a front of nine bays, the middle five bay projecting slightly under a parapet. In the ground floor are shop fronts, and the upper floor contains round-arched windows with archivolts, impost bands, and keystones. In the left return are three bays, and the right return has two bays and a rounded corner.	II
15, 16 and 17 Victoria Road; 53.83678°N 1.79021°W		By 1868	A row of shops and houses, they are in stone with rusticated quoins, a deep entablature between the floors, deep bracketed eaves, and a hipped Welsh slate roof. There are two storeys and a front of nine bays, the middle five bay projecting slightly under a parapet. In the ground floor is a central round-arched doorway with a fanlight, two shop fronts to the left, and two sash windows to the right. Further to the right are a flat-headed doorway with a fanlight and two windows. The upper floor contains round-arched windows with archivolts, impost bands, and keystones. In the left return are two bays, and the right return has three bays.	II
18–23 Victoria Road and 50 and 51 Titus Street; 53.83641°N 1.79036°W		By 1868	A terrace of houses, they are in stone with a band, stone gutter brackets, and a Welsh slate roof, hipped over the end blocks. Nos. 50 and 51 Titus Street have three storeys, the rest have two, all have two bays, and there are four bays on the returns. The doorways have rectangular fanlights, the windows have sunk panels, and all have cornices on long brackets.	II
24–49 Victoria Road, wall, piers and railings 53.83557°N 1.79107°W		1868	A group of almshouses, they are in stone with bracketed eaves, and Welsh slate roofs with modillioned gables. The buildings form a symmetrical U-shaped plan, most have a single storey, and the end blocks and four intermediate blocks are gabled with two storeys. In the centre is a two-storey, three-bay block, the outer bays gabled with carvings in the tympani, and on the roof is a square bell turret with a pedimented top. The windows in the almshouses are paired sashes with central colonnettes, some with decorative friezes, and the entrances are also paired and have open porches with central colonnettes. At the north and south ends are coped walls and piers with decorative caps, and at the south end are two lengths of cast iron railings.	II
50–64 Victoria Road, railings and piers 53.83536°N 1.79021°W		1868	A group of 14 almshouses, they are in stone with bracketed eaves and gables, and Welsh slate roofs. The almshouses have one or two storeys. In the centre is a two-storey, three-bay block, the outer bays gabled with carvings in the tympani, and on the roof is a square bell turret with a pedimented top. The windows in the almshouses are paired sashes with central colonnettes, some with decorative friezes, and the entrances are also paired and have open porches with central colonnettes. Attached to the right is a wall containing two square piers with decorative caps, and cast iron railings.	II
67, 68, 69, 70 and 71 Victoria Road and arcade 53.83648°N 1.78996°W		By 1868	A terrace of houses, they are in stone with sill bands, stone gutter brackets, and a hipped Welsh slate roof. No. 71 has three storeys, the other houses have two, each house has two bays, and there are two bays on the returns. The doorways have rectangular fanlights, the ground floor windows have sunken panels, and all have cornices on long brackets. The upper floor windows are plain, and attached to the left is a two-bay arcade.	II
72, 73, 74 and 75 Victoria Road and arcade 53.83675°N 1.78987°W		By 1868	A terrace of houses, they are in stone with sill bands, moulded stone gutter brackets, and a hipped Welsh slate roof. There are two storeys, each house has two bays, and there are two bays on the returns. The doorways have rectangular fanlights, the ground floor windows have sunken panels, all have cornices on long brackets, and the upper floor windows are plain. Attached to each return is a two-bay arcade, and in the left return are two gabled attic dormers.	II
76, 77 and 78 Victoria Road and arcade 53.83744°N 1.78965°W		By 1868	A terrace of houses, they are in stone with a band, moulded stone gutter brackets, and a hipped Welsh slate roof. There are two storeys, each house has two bays, No. 76 projects slightly, and there are two bays on the right return. The doorways have rectangular fanlights, the ground floor windows have sunken panels, all have cornices on long brackets, and the upper floor windows have square heads. Attached to the right is a two-bay arcade.	II
79 Victoria Road and arcade 53.83753°N 1.78963°W		By 1868	A shop on a corner site, it is in stone, with rusticated quoins, a deep entablature between the floors, a bracketed moulded eaves cornice and a hipped Welsh slate roof. There are two storeys, one bay on Victoria Road, two on Caroline Street, and a curved bay on the corner. On each front is a shop window, to the left is a round-arched window, and in the upper floor contains round-arched windows with archivolts, impost bands, and keystones. Attached to the left is a two-bay arcade.	II
Sir Titus Salt's Hospital, wall and piers 53.83583°N 1.79009°W		1868	The hospital, later used for other purposes, it is in stone with bands, bracketed eaves, and a Welsh slate roof with modillioned gables. There are three storeys, a front of eleven bays with some bays projecting and gabled, and three bays on the left return. The windows have a single light, or are paired with a central colonnette, some have decorative friezes, and all have hood moulds. The doorway to the left has a fanlight, and to the right is an open porch with a central colonnette. The middle bay on the left return is gabled and in the tympanum is carving and a coat of arms, and below is a canted bay window. On the left side is a dwarf wall and square piers with decorative pyramidal caps.	II
Saltaire School, wall, gate, gate piers and sculpted lions 53.83717°N 1.79046°W		1869	The school, later part of Shipley College, is in Italianate style, and is in stone with a Welsh slate roof. There is a single storey at the front, and this consists of three pedimented pavilions joined by three-bay colonnades, with lower rooms behind. The central pavilion contains two round-arched windows with keystones, flanked by Corinthian columns carrying an entablature. In the tympanum is elaborate carving, and above is a bell turret over which are carvings of a boy and a girl. Each outer pavilion contains a Venetian window, and in the tympanum is an initialled roundel. At the rear is a two-storey nine-bay wing. In front of the school is a stone boundary wall, cast iron railings, two pairs of stone gate piers, and corner piers carrying sculpted lions.	II*
Victoria Hall, wall, gate piers, railings and sculpted lions 53.83708°N 1.78945°W		1869–72	The hall is in stone, with vermiculated and pilaster-quoins, dentilled cornices between the floors, and a modillion cornice under a panelled parapet, which contains pedimented piers with iron finials, and a Welsh slate roof. There are two storeys and a basement and a symmetrical front of eleven bays. The central bay projects and contains a portal with a round-arched entrance over which is a cartouche with the Salt coat of arms flanked by statues. At the top is an elaborate tower with a pyramidal roof. The basement windows have square heads and the other windows are round-headed, those in the upper floor flanked by Corinthian colonnettes, and with carved keystones and blind balustrades. The meeting hall projects at the rear. In front of the building is a dwarf wall, square piers, and two sculpted lions, and at the rear are cast iron railings.	II*
Former tram shed 53.83572°N 1.79536°W		1904	The former tram shed is in stone with a Welsh slate roof, it has a single storey and a basement to the right. At the front and rear are two gabled bays, and along the sides are seven bays. The entrances are square-headed and flanked by buttresses, and at the tops of the gables are panels, each with a small swept triangular pediment, and containing a cartouche and the date. To the right is a small office with a canted bay window. Along the left side, the bays are divided by buttresses, each bay contains a Diocletian window, and there are similar windows in the gables at the rear.	II
War Memorial; 53.83887°N 1.79050°W		1920	The war memorial is in the grounds of Saltaire Congregational Church. It is in Bolton Wood stone, and consists of a square obelisk 5 metres (16 ft) tall on a plinth and a base of two steps. On the front is a bronze plaque surmounted by a Latin cross carrying an inscription and the names of those who served and those who were lost in the First World War. There is another inscribed plaque on the front of the plinth.	II
Telephone kiosk 53.83794°N 1.79187°W		1935	The telephone kiosk opposite No. 7 Edward Street is of the K6 type, designed by Giles Gilbert Scott. Constructed in cast iron with a square plan and a dome, it has unperforated crowns in the top panels.	II
