= Civil parishes in West Yorkshire =

Local government divisions of West Yorkshire, England

A map of West Yorkshire, showing the Metropolitan Boroughs: (1) Leeds; (2) Wakefield; (3) Kirklees; (4) Calderdale; and (5) Bradford.

A civil parish is a subnational entity, forming the lowest unit of local government in England. There are 101 civil parishes in the ceremonial county of West Yorkshire, most of the county being unparished. At the 2001 census, there were 557,369 people living in the parishes, accounting for 26.8 per cent of the county's population.

== History ==
Parishes arose from Church of England divisions, and were originally purely ecclesiastical divisions. Over time they acquired civil administration powers.

The Highways Act 1555 made parishes responsible for the upkeep of roads. Every adult inhabitant of the parish was obliged to work four days a year on the roads, providing their own tools, carts and horses; the work was overseen by an unpaid local appointee, the Surveyor of Highways.

The poor were looked after by the monasteries, until their dissolution. In 1572, magistrates were given power to 'survey the poor' and impose taxes for their relief. This system was made more formal by the Poor Law Act 1601, which made parishes responsible for administering the Poor Law; overseers were appointed to charge a rate to support the poor of the parish. The 19th century saw an increase in the responsibility of parishes, although the Poor Law powers were transferred to poor law unions. The Public Health Act 1872 (35 & 36 Vict. c. 79) grouped parishes into rural sanitary districts, based on the poor law unions; these subsequently formed the basis for rural districts.

Parishes were run by vestries, meeting annually to appoint officials, and were generally identical to ecclesiastical parishes, although some townships in large parishes administered the Poor Law themselves; under the Divided Parishes and Poor Law Amendment Act 1882, all extra-parochial areas and townships that levied a separate rate became independent civil parishes.

Civil parishes in their modern sense date from the Local Government Act 1894 (56 & 57 Vict. c. 73), which abolished vestries; established elected parish councils in all rural parishes with more than 300 electors; grouped rural parishes into rural districts; and aligned parish boundaries with county and borough boundaries. Urban civil parishes continued to exist, and were generally coterminous with the urban district, municipal borough or county borough in which they were situated; many large towns contained a number of parishes, and these were usually merged into one. Parish councils were not formed in urban areas, and the only function of the parish was to elect guardians to poor law unions; with the abolition of the Poor Law system in 1930 the parishes had only a nominal existence.

The Local Government Act 1972 retained civil parishes in rural areas, and many former urban districts and municipal boroughs that were being abolished, were replaced by new successor parishes; urban areas that were considered too large to be single parishes became unparished areas.

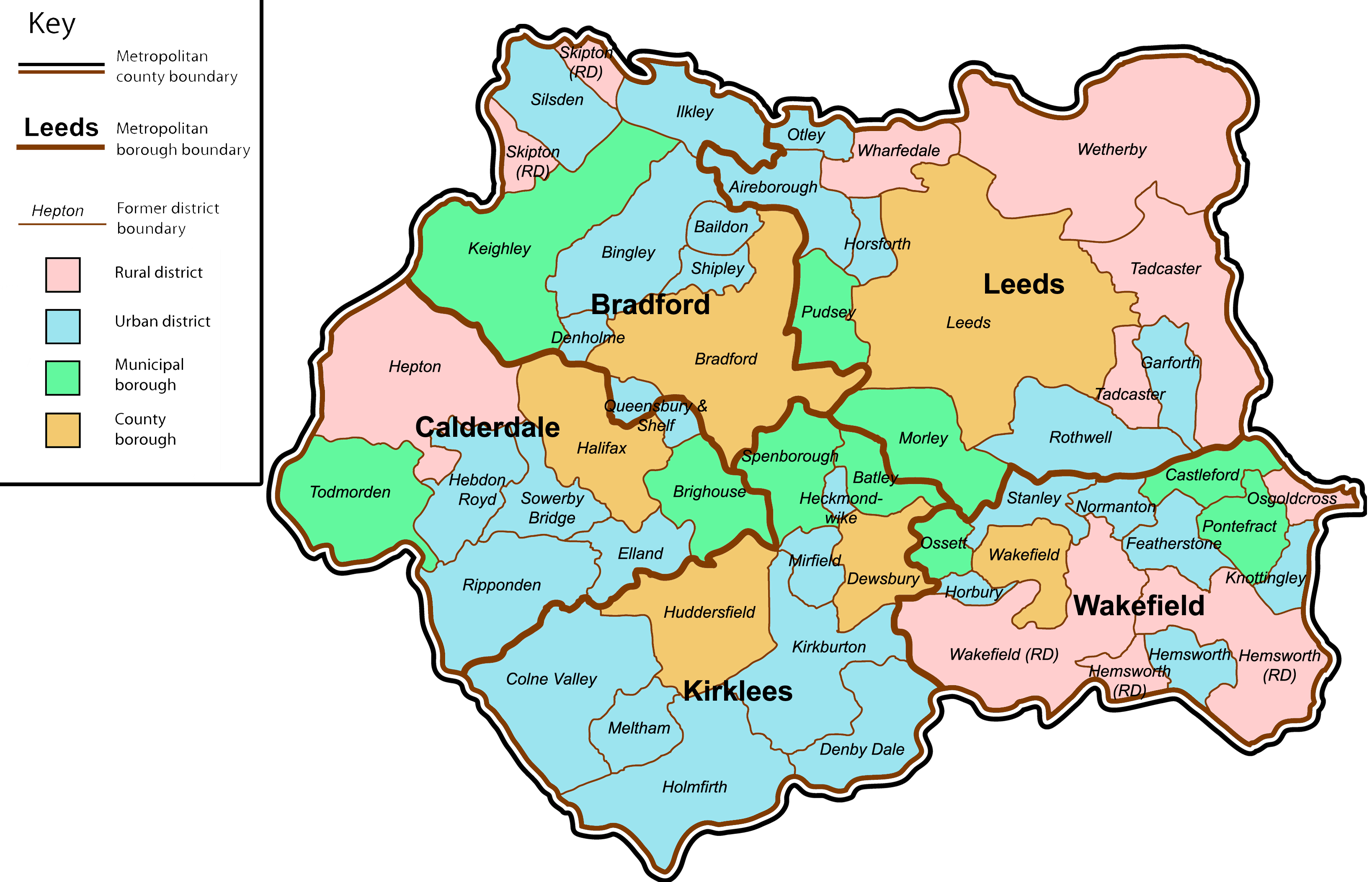
West Yorkshire showing the former local authorities

== The current position ==
Recent governments have encouraged the formation of town and parish councils in unparished areas, and the Local Government and Rating Act 1997 gave local residents the right to demand the creation of a new civil parish.

A parish council can become a town council unilaterally, simply by resolution; and a civil parish can also gain city status, but only if that is granted by the Crown. The chairman of a town or city council is called a mayor. The Local Government and Public Involvement in Health Act 2007 introduced alternative names: a parish council can now choose to be called a community; village; or neighbourhood council.

Civil parishes with town status

== List of civil parishes and unparished areas ==
Map of civil parishes and unparished areas in West Yorkshire

Image	Name	Status	Population	District	Former local authority	Refs
	Addingham	Civil parish	3,599	Bradford	Skipton; Rural District	
	Baildon	Civil parish	16,363	Bradford	Baildon; Urban District	
	Bingley	Town	15,883	Bradford	Bingley; Urban District	
	Bradford	Unparished area	248,037	Bradford	Bradford; County Borough	
	Burley	Civil parish	6,755	Bradford	Ilkley; Urban District	
	Clayton	Civil parish	8,270	Bradford	Bradford; County Borough	
	Cross Roads	Civil parish		Bradford	Keighley; Municipal Borough	
	Cullingworth	Civil parish	2,759	Bradford	Bingley; Urban District	
	Denholme	Town	2,976	Bradford	Denholme; Urban District	
	Harden	Civil parish	1,915	Bradford	Bingley; Urban District	
	Haworth and Stanbury	Civil parish		Bradford	Keighley; Municipal Borough	
	Ilkley	Civil parish	13,828	Bradford	Ilkley; Urban District	
	Keighley	Town	51,429	Bradford	Keighley; Municipal Borough	
	Menston	Civil parish	4,371	Bradford	Ilkley; Urban District	
	Oxenhope	Civil parish	2,476	Bradford	Keighley; Municipal Borough	
	Queensbury	Unparished area	9,702	Bradford	Queensbury and Shelf; Urban District	
	Sandy Lane	Civil parish	2,399	Bradford	Bradford; County Borough	
	Shipley	Town	24,741	Bradford	Shipley; Urban District	
	Silsden	Town	7,999	Bradford	Silsden; Urban District	
	Steeton with Eastburn	Civil parish	4,277	Bradford	Skipton; Rural District	
	Trident	Community	17,184	Bradford	Bradford; County Borough	
	Wilsden	Civil parish	4,312	Bradford	Bingley; Urban District	
	Wrose	Civil parish	6,729	Bradford	Shipley; Urban District	
	Blackshaw	Civil parish	935	Calderdale	Hepton; Rural District	
	Brighouse	Unparished area	36,219	Calderdale	Brighouse; Municipal Borough	
	Elland	Unparished area	19,763	Calderdale	Elland; Urban District	
	Erringden	Civil parish	194	Calderdale	Hepton; Rural District	
	Halifax	Unparished area	76,870	Calderdale	Halifax; County Borough	
	Hebden Royd	Town	9,092	Calderdale	Hebden Royd; Urban District	
	Heptonstall	Civil parish	1,448	Calderdale	Hepton; Rural District	
	Ripponden	Civil parish	6,412	Calderdale	Ripponden; Urban District	
	Shelf	Unparished area	4,821	Calderdale	Queensbury and Shelf; Urban District	
	Sowerby Bridge	Unparished area	20,254	Calderdale	Sowerby Bridge; Urban District	
	Stainland and District	Civil parish	3,178	Calderdale	Elland; Urban District	
	Todmorden	Town	14,941	Calderdale	Todmorden; Municipal Borough	
	Wadsworth	Civil parish	1,456	Calderdale	Hepton; Rural District	
	Batley	Unparished area	47,083	Kirklees	Batley; Municipal Borough	
	Colne Valley	Unparished area	22,765	Kirklees	Colne Valley; Urban District	
	Denby Dale	Civil parish	14,982	Kirklees	Denby Dale; Urban District	
	Dewsbury	Unparished area	51,077	Kirklees	Dewsbury; County Borough	
	Heckmondwike	Unparished area	10,651	Kirklees	Heckmondwike; Urban District	
	Holme Valley	Civil parish	25,049	Kirklees	Holmfirth; Urban District	
	Huddersfield	Unparished area	121,140	Kirklees	Huddersfield; County Borough	
	Kirkburton	Civil parish	23,986	Kirklees	Kirkburton; Urban District	
	Meltham	Town	8,089	Kirklees	Meltham; Urban District	
	Mirfield	Town	18,621	Kirklees	Mirfield; Urban District	
	Spenborough	Unparished area	45,124	Kirklees	Spenborough; Municipal Borough	
	Aberford	Civil parish	1,059	Leeds	Tadcaster; Rural District	
	Aireborough	Unparished area	25,909 (excluding Rawdon)	Leeds	Aireborough; Urban District	
	Allerton Bywater	Civil parish	3,948	Leeds	Garforth; Urban District	
	Alwoodley	Civil parish	9,129	Leeds	Leeds; County Borough	
	Ardsley East and West	Unparished area	15,458	Leeds	Morley; Municipal Borough	
	Arthington	Civil parish	561	Leeds	Wharfedale; Rural District	
	Austhorpe	Civil parish	65	Leeds	Tadcaster; Rural District	
	Bardsey cum Rigton	Civil parish	2,385	Leeds	Wetherby; Rural District	
	Barwick in Elmet and Scholes	Civil parish	5,120	Leeds	Tadcaster; Rural District	
	Boston Spa	Civil parish	4,006	Leeds	Wetherby; Rural District	
	Bramham cum Oglethorpe	Civil parish	1,715	Leeds	Wetherby; Rural District	
	Bramhope	Civil parish	3,400	Leeds	Wharfedale; Rural District	
	Carlton	Civil parish	169	Leeds	Wharfedale; Rural District	
	Clifford	Civil parish	1,641	Leeds	Wetherby; Rural District	
	Collingham	Civil parish	2,967	Leeds	Wetherby; Rural District	
	Drighlington	Civil parish	5,147	Leeds	Morley; Municipal Borough	
	East Keswick	Civil parish	1,224	Leeds	Wetherby; Rural District	
	Garforth	Unparished area	15,128	Leeds	Garforth; Urban District	
	Gildersome	Civil parish	5,708	Leeds	Morley; Municipal Borough	
	Great and Little Preston	Civil parish	1,449	Leeds	Tadcaster; Rural District	
	Harewood	Civil parish	3,854	Leeds	Wetherby; Rural District	
	Horsforth	Town	18,928	Leeds	Horsforth; Urban District	
	Kippax	Civil parish	10,120	Leeds	Garforth; Urban District	
	Ledsham	Civil parish	162	Leeds	Tadcaster; Rural District	
	Ledston	Unparished area	400	Leeds	Tadcaster; Rural District	
	Leeds	Unparished area	425,093	Leeds	Leeds; County Borough	
	Lotherton cum Aberford	Civil parish	230	Leeds	Tadcaster; Rural District	
	Micklefield	Civil parish	1,852	Leeds	Tadcaster; Rural District	
	Morley	Town	27,738	Leeds	Morley; Municipal Borough	
	Otley	Town	14,124	Leeds	Otley; Urban District	
	Parlington	Civil parish	87	Leeds	Tadcaster; Rural District	
	Pool	Civil parish	1,785	Leeds	Wharfedale; Rural District	
	Pudsey	Unparished area	45,013	Leeds	Pudsey; Municipal Borough	
	Rawdon	Civil parish	6,461	Leeds	Aireborough; Urban District	
	Rothwell	Unparished area	32,365	Leeds	Rothwell; Urban District	
	Scarcroft	Civil parish	1,153	Leeds	Wetherby; Rural District	
	Shadwell	Civil parish	1,864	Leeds	Leeds; County Borough	
	Sturton Grange	Civil parish	417	Leeds	Tadcaster; Rural District	
	Swillington	Civil parish	3,530	Leeds	Tadcaster; Rural District	
	Thorner	Civil parish	1,503	Leeds	Wetherby; Rural District	
	Thorp Arch	Civil parish	1,123	Leeds	Wetherby; Rural District	
	Walton	Civil parish	217	Leeds	Wetherby; Rural District	
	Wetherby	Town	11,155	Leeds	Wetherby; Rural District	
	Wothersome	Civil parish	40	Leeds	Wetherby; Rural District	
	Ackworth	Civil parish	6,493	Wakefield	Hemsworth; Rural District	
	Badsworth	Civil parish	583	Wakefield	Hemsworth; Rural District	
	Castleford	Unparished area	37,302	Wakefield	Castleford; Municipal Borough	
	Chevet	Civil parish	66	Wakefield	Wakefield; Rural District	
	Crigglestone	Civil parish	9,189	Wakefield	Wakefield; Rural District	
	Crofton	Civil parish	5,978	Wakefield	Wakefield; Rural District	
	Darrington	Civil parish	1,308	Wakefield	Osgoldcross; Rural District	
	East Hardwick	Civil parish	191	Wakefield	Osgoldcross; Rural District	
	Featherstone	Town	14,175	Wakefield	Featherstone; Urban District	
	Havercroft with Cold Hiendley	Civil parish	2,103	Wakefield	Hemsworth; Rural District	
	Hemsworth	Town	13,311	Wakefield	Hemsworth; Urban District	
	Hessle and Hill Top	Civil parish	97	Wakefield	Hemsworth; Rural District	
	Horbury	Unparished area	9,695	Wakefield	Horbury; Urban District	
	Huntwick with Foulby and Nostell	Civil parish	90	Wakefield	Hemsworth; Rural District	
	Knottingley	Unparished area	13,503	Wakefield	Knottingley; Urban District	
	Newland with Woodhouse Moor	Civil parish	0	Wakefield	Wakefield; Rural District	
	Normanton and Altofts	Town	19,949	Wakefield	Normanton; Urban District	
	Notton	Civil parish	880	Wakefield	Wakefield; Rural District	
	Ossett	Unparished area	21,076	Wakefield	Ossett; Municipal Borough	
	Pontefract	Unparished area	28,250	Wakefield	Pontefract; Municipal Borough	
	Ryhill	Civil parish	2,628	Wakefield	Hemsworth; Rural District	
	Sharlston	Civil parish	2,756	Wakefield	Wakefield; Rural District	
	Sitlington	Civil parish	5,718	Wakefield	Wakefield; Rural District	
	South Elmsall	Town	6,107	Wakefield	Hemsworth; Rural District	
	South Hiendley	Civil parish	1,667	Wakefield	Hemsworth; Rural District	
	South Kirkby and Moorthorpe	Town	10,979	Wakefield	Hemsworth; Rural District	
	Stanley	Unparished area	30,776	Wakefield	Stanley; Urban District	
	Thorpe Audlin	Civil parish	659	Wakefield	Hemsworth; Rural District	
	Upton and North Elmsall	Civil parish		Wakefield	Hemsworth; Rural District	
	Wakefield	Unparished area	56,588	Wakefield	Wakefield; County Borough	
	Walton	Civil parish	3,377	Wakefield	Wakefield; Rural District	
	Warmfield cum Heath	Civil parish	844	Wakefield	Wakefield; Rural District	
	Wentbridge	Civil parish		Wakefield		
	West Bretton	Civil parish	546	Wakefield	Wakefield; Rural District	
	West Hardwick	Civil parish	29	Wakefield	Hemsworth; Rural District	
	Wintersett	Unparished area	50	Wakefield	Wakefield; Rural District	
	Woolley	Civil parish	575	Wakefield	Wakefield; Rural District	

== See also ==
- List of civil parishes in England
