= Listed buildings in Wadsworth, West Yorkshire =

Wadsworth is a civil parish in the metropolitan borough of Calderdale, West Yorkshire, England. It contains 94 listed buildings that are recorded in the National Heritage List for England. Of these, two are at Grade II*, the middle of the three grades, and the others are at Grade II, the lowest grade. The parish contains the small settlements of Chiserley, Old Town, and Pecket Well, and is otherwise rural. The list also includes two buildings from Calder Ward. Most of the listed buildings are houses with associated structures and cottages, including laithe houses, farmhouses and farm buildings, and almost all of these are in stone with stone slate roofs and mullioned windows. The other listed buildings include a boundary stone, bridges, chapels and associated structures, a public house, a pinfold, guide posts and milestones, former mills, the gatehouse and lodges of a demolished house, a water garden and pumphouse, two ventilation shafts, and a war memorial.

== Key ==
Grade	Criteria
II*	Particularly important buildings of more than special interest
II	Buildings of national importance and special interest

== Buildings ==
Name and location	Photograph	Date	Notes	Grade
Greenwood Stone; 53.75303°N 1.97641°W		16th century (possible}	A boundary stone marking the boundary between the townships of Midgley and Wadsworth. It is 5 feet (1.5 m) high with sides of 12 inches (300 mm) and 9 inches (230 mm), it tapers slightly, and is deeply incised with the date "1779".	II
Akroyd Farmhouse and Cottage; 53.75878°N 2.00773°W		Late 16th century	The earliest part is the cross-wing, which is attached to a late 17th-century hall range replacing an earlier timber framed hall. The house is in stone, and the roof has coped gables with kneelers and crocketed finials. There are two storeys, and a T-shaped plan with a hall range of three bays. The windows are mullioned, some with hood moulds. Most of the doorways have Tudor arched lintels with spandrels, and there are inserted doorways with monolithic jambs.	II*
Lower Small Shaw Farmhouse and barn 53.77120°N 2.01256°W	—	Late 16th century	The farmhouse was extended in the 17th century, and again in the 19th century. The building is in stone with a stone slate roof, and has an L-shaped plan with a main range and a rear kitchen wing. The farmhouse has a string course, two storeys, and mullioned windows. On the front of the barn is a tall cart entry with a chamfered surround, composite jambs, and a monolithic lintel, and a doorway to the right, and at the rear is a semicircular-arched cart entry. In the kitchen wing is a mullioned and transomed window with six over eight lights.	II
Stone Booth Farmhouse and Cottage; 53.78007°N 2.01114°W	—	Late 16th century	The house was enlarged in about 1700, a further storey was added in about 1800, and it has been divided into two dwellings. The building is in stone with a stone slate roof. There are two storeys and a cellar, a porch with a lean-to roof on the front, and a kitchen wing at the rear. The porch has a chamfered surround, and a shaped lintel with three semicircles, and the inner doorway has a chamfered surround and a Tudor arched lintel. Elsewhere is a doorway with a tie-stone jamb, and in the kitchen wing is a doorway with a Tudor arch. The windows are mullioned, and on the gable of the kitchen wing is a St Andrew's Cross finial.	II
Lower Crimsworth Farmhouse; 53.76232°N 2.01236°W	—	1599	A porch was added to the farmhouse in 1661 and it was further extended in about 1974. It is in stone with a stone slate roof, two storeys, three bays, and a single-storey outshut at the rear. The porch has a coped gable with kneelers, and a doorway with a shaped lintel and a datestone above. The windows are chamfered and most have mullions.	II
Grain; 53.78283°N 2.01055°W	—	1604	The house is in stone and has a stone slate roof with coped gables and kneelers. There is one storey, and it consists of a three-bay hall range and a cross-wing, with a later outshut on the left. The windows are chamfered and mullioned, the windows in the hall range having moulded mullions. In the cross-wing is a moulded string course and a datestone.	II
3, 4 and 5 Chiserley Hall; 53.75000°N 1.99829°W	—	1617	A stone house, later divided into three dwellings, with a moulded string course, and two parallel stone slate roofs with coped gables and kneelers. There are two storeys, and a double-depth plan. On the front is a two-storey gabled porch that has a Tudor arched doorway with a moulded surround, and a similar inner doorway. Above the doorway is a two-light window with arched lights, and over that a date plaque. To the right is an inserted doorway with monolithic jambs. The windows are chamfered and mullioned, those in the ground floor with hood moulds.	II
Far Nook; 53.74602°N 1.99187°W	—	Early 17th century	A derelict house with a timber framed core, encased in stone and with a stone slate roof. There are two storeys and three bays. The porch was added in the 18th century, and has a doorway with a segmental arch, the original doorway having a chamfered surround. The windows are mullioned.	II
Haworth Hall and barn 53.77676°N 2.01001°W	—	Early 17th century	The barn was added to the farmhouse in the 19th century. The building is in stone, partly rendered, with a stone slate roof. The barn has a semicircular-arched cart entry with impost blocks and a keystone, a doorway to the left with a chamfered surround, and a doorway further to the left with tie-stone jambs. The windows in both parts are mullioned, and there is one with a monolithic lintel carved as three arched heads with sunken spandrels.	II
Old Town Hall, Old Town Hall Cottages and gateway 53.75170°N 2.00288°W	—	Early 17th century	The cottages were added to the house in the 18th century, and the buildings are in stone with stone slate roofs. A Tudor arched gateway with a moulded surround leads to an enclosed courtyard. The house has two storeys and an attic, a main range, and a rear wing, and its roof has coped gables with kneelers and ball finials. On the front is a two-storey gabled porch that has a Tudor arched doorway with sunken spandrels containing shields, and a moulded surround. The windows are mullioned and some also have transoms. The cottages front the lane and have mainly altered windows and inserted doorways.	II
Upper Small Shaw Farmhouse and barn 53.77471°N 2.01066°W	—	Early 17th century	The house was enlarged and a porch and a barn were added in 1681. The building is in stone and has a stone slate roof with coped gables and kneelers. The house has two storeys, mullioned windows, a gabled porch on a plinth, and a doorway with a chamfered surround and an ogee lintel. The barn to the left has a semicircular-arched cart entry with chamfered jambs, and a doorway with monolithic jambs and a dated lintel. At the rear of the barn is an aisle containing a square-headed cart entry with tie-stone jambs.	II
Old Town Farmhouse and barn 53.75093°N 2.00173°W	—	1637	The barn was added to the farmhouse in the 19th century. The building is in stone with quoins, stone slate on one side of the roof and blue slate on the other, and coped gables, kneelers, and a crocketed finial on the cross-wing. There are two storeys and a basement, a hall range of three bays, and a gabled cross-wing. The windows are mullioned, including one stepped window and three ten-light windows. The doorway on the front has a chamfered surround and composite jambs, and there is a doorway at the rear with a chamfered surround and a monolithic lintel. Attached to the farmhouse is a gabled building with a columbarium in the apex. The barn is at right angles and contains an arched cart entry with a Venetian window above.	II
Cross Ends Farmhouse and barn 53.78242°N 2.00936°W	—	Mid-17th century	A bay was added to the south of the house in the early 18th century, and the barn was added to the north later in the century. The building is in stone with quoins, and it forms a long range with two storeys. The house has three bays, and a central porch with a Tudor arched doorway that has a moulded surround, and the inner doorway has a moulded surround and a straight lintel. The windows are mullioned with hood moulds over the ground floor windows. At the junction of the house and the barn is a doorway with tie-stone jambs, and the barn contains doorways and a cart entry within a porch.	II
Ibbot Royd Farmhouse; 53.74806°N 1.99954°W	—	Mid-17th century	A porch was added to the farmhouse in about 1730. The farmhouse is in stone, and has a stone slate roof with coped gables and kneelers on the left. There are two storeys and three bays. The porch is gabled, the windows are chamfered, and most have mullions.	II
Middle Nook and attached barn 53.74674°N 1.99122°W	—	Mid-17th century	A house, later four cottages, extended and with a barn added in the 19th century, it is in stone and has a stone slate roof with coped gables on the left. The house has two storeys and a projecting wing to the west, and contains mullioned windows. The barn has a semicircular-arched cart entry with a Venetian window above.	II
Crimsworth Farmhouse and barn 53.76230°N 2.01187°W	—	Late 17th century	The barn was added to the farmhouse in the 18th century. It is in stone and has a stone slate roof with a coped gable and kneelers on the left. The farmhouse has two storeys and two bays, a single-storey aisle at the rear, mullioned windows, and a later gabled porch. The barn has a tall cart entry with a chamfered surround, and a monolithic lintel.	II
Barn north of Grain; 53.78297°N 2.01078°W	—	Late 17th century	The barn was mostly rebuilt in the 19th century. It is in stone with a stone slate roof. The barn contains three doorways, one with a chamfered surround and a quoined lintel, one with a chamfered surround and a Tudor arch, and the other with monolithic jambs and a giant quoined lintel. The cart entry has chamfered jambs and a shouldered lintel, and above it is a Venetian window.	II
House south-southeast of Hill Top; 53.76228°N 2.02660°W	—	Late 17th century	A small cottage in stone with quoins, and a stone slate roof. There are two storeys at the front, one at the rear under a catslide roof, and one bay. The windows are mullioned, and the doorway has monolithic jambs.	II
Horse Hey Farmhouse and barn 53.77032°N 2.01267°W	—	Late 17th century	The oldest part is the barn, the house being added in the 19th century to form a laithe house. It is in stone with quoins, and a stone slate roof with coped gables and kneelers. The house has two storeys and two bays, mullioned windows, and a doorway with tie-stone jambs. The barn has a projecting aisle, on the front is a segmental-arched cart entry with a Venetian window above, and at the rear is a lean-to porch with a monolithic lintel. In the aisle are chamfered rectangular vents, and two doorways with chamfered surrounds and quoined lintels. Attached to the south is a low two-storey cottage.	II
Lane Head; 53.79067°N 2.00456°W	—	Late 17th century	A house later used for other purposes, it is in stone with quoins and a stone slate roof. There are two storeys and two bays. The original doorway has a chamfered surround, composite jambs and a deep lintel, and there is a 19th-century doorway with monolithic jambs and lintel. The main window is chamfered and mullioned with eight lights.	II
Lower Purprice; 53.76559°N 2.01446°W	—	Late 17th century	A stone house that has a stone slate roof with coped gables, kneelers, and diamond-shaped finials. There are two storeys and two bays. The porch is gabled with a finial, and has an arched doorway with a chamfered surround, and a window above. The windows are chamfered and mullioned, and in the right return is a three-light window with arched lights, sunken spandrels and moulded mullions.	II
Nook Farmhouse and barn 53.74746°N 1.99070°W	—	Late 17th century	The oldest part is a cottage, to which the farmhouse was added in the 18th century, and a barn at the other end in the 19th century. The building is in stone with quoins and a stone slate roof. The windows are mullioned, and the house has two doorways, one with tie-stone jambs, the other with monolithic jambs. In the barn is a semicircular-arched cart entry flanked by doorways.	II
Purprice Farmhouse; 53.76559°N 2.01459°W	—	Late 17th century	A stone house with quoins on the left, and a stone slate roof with a coped gable with kneelers on the left. The windows are mullioned, and at the rear is a Tudor arched doorway with a moulded surround and sunken spandrels.	II
Barn east of Gib Farmhouse; 53.77700°N 2.00974°W	—	Late 17th to early 18th century	A stone barn with quoins, and a stone slate roof with coped gables and kneelers. It contains a tall cart entry with a chamfered surround and composite jambs. There is a doorway with tie-stone jambs and a crude inscription, and a doorway with a quoined lintel; both have chamfered surrounds.	II
Crimsworth Cottage and barn 53.76253°N 2.01224°W	—	1703	The oldest part is the barn, and the cottage was added to the north in 1791. They are in stone with quoins and a stone slate roof. The barn has a cart entry in a porch with a monolithic lintel, and at right angles is an outshut with a chamfered surround and a dated quoined lintel. The cottage has two storeys and one bay, a doorway with interrupted jambs, and mullioned windows.	II
Crabtree Fold Farmhouse; 53.75133°N 2.00241°W	—	Early 18th century (probable)	The farmhouse, which was altered in the 19th century, is in stone with a stone slate roof. There are two storeys, an L-shaped plan, and two bays. The windows are mullioned.	II
Building northeast of Middle Nook; 53.74697°N 1.99114°W	—	Early 18th century	A derelict house in rendered stone, that has a stone slate roof with coped gables and kneelers. There are two storeys, two bays, and a rear single-storey outshut. The windows are mullioned and the doorways have monolithic jambs.	II
Lumb Bridge; 53.77910°N 2.01310°W		Early 18th century (probable)	A packhorse bridge over Crimsworth Dean Beck. It is in stone and consists of a single segmental arch. The bridge has cast iron handrails, but no parapets.	II
Wilcroft Farmhouse and part of Wilcroft House; 53.76303°N 2.00745°W	—	c. 1728	A stone house with quoins and a stone slate roof. There are two storeys, a double-depth plan, and two bays. The windows are chamfered and mullioned. In the wide right gable end is a doorway with double tie-stone jambs and a monolithic lintel, and in the apex is a blocked oculus.	II
White Hole; 53.79068°N 2.00152°W	—	1731	A stone house with quoins and a stone slate roof. There are two storeys and three bays. The porch is gabled with coping and kneelers, the inner doorway has a chamfered surround and composite jambs, and the date is in a tressure. The windows are chamfered and mullioned.	II
Carrs Cottage; 53.74552°N 1.99761°W	—	Mid-18th century	A pair of cottages, the second added in the 19th century. They are in stone with quoins and stone slate roofs. There are two storeys and a small gabled outshut, and the second cottage is higher. Most of the windows are mullioned, one doorway has a chamfered surround, and the other has tie-stone jambs.	II
Bee boles east of Over Wood Farmhouse; 53.77886°N 2.05044°W	—	Mid-18th century (probable)	The bee boles consist of seven recesses in a wall separated by stone mullions carrying a thinner top stop stone. On top of this is a dry stone wall.	II
Old Town Farm Cottages; 53.75110°N 2.00139°W	—	Mid-18th century	A pair of stone cottages with quoins and a stone slate roof. There are two storeys, and each cottage has one bay, a doorway with a chamfered surround, composite jambs, and a quoined lintel, and the windows are mullioned.	II
Building south of Pecket Well Mill Shed; 53.76323°N 2.00560°W	—	Mid-18th century	A pair of mirror-image stone cottages that have a stone slate roof with gables and kneelers. There are two storeys and two bays The windows are chamfered and mullioned, and the doorways have chamfered surrounds and quoined lintels; the right doorway is blocked.	II
Top O'th Hill; 53.74925°N 1.99424°W	—	Early 19th century	A pair of cottages was added to the original cottage in the 19th century and it has been combined into a single dwelling. It is in stone with quoins, and stone slate roofs with coped gables and kneelers. The original cottage has one storey, one bay, and a doorway with a chamfered surround, tie-stone jambs, and a quoined lintel. The later cottages have two storeys and two bays, and the windows in both parts are mullioned.	II
Field Head Barn; 53.76408°N 2.02931°W	—	1768	A derelict barn in stone with quoins and a stone slate roof. There is a porch with a catslide roof containing a cart entry with a chamfered surround, a straight lintel and a datestone. To the right is a doorway with a chamfered surround and a quoined lintel.	II
Pasture Farmhouse and barn 53.74920°N 1.96268°W	—	1773	The building is in stone with quoins and a stone slate roof. The house has two storeys, and the windows are mullioned. In the barn is a semicircular-arched cart entry with an impost block and a dated keystone, and to the left is a doorway with a chamfered surround and composite jambs.	II
Upper Mytholm Farmhouse and barn 53.74965°N 1.95455°W	—	1775	Two cottages and a barn combined into a single dwelling, they are in stone with quoins and a stone slate roof. The cottages have two storeys, mullioned windows, a gabled porch, and a doorway with tie-stone jambs. The barn is at a lower level and contains a semicircular-arched cart entry with an impost block and a keystone, and a doorway with tie-stone jambs. In the right return is a circular owl hole with sunken spandrels over which is the date.	II
1-3, Old Town Hall Court; 53.75141°N 2.00270°W	—	Late 18th century	The roof of the barn was raised in 1835. The barn is in stone with a stone slate roof and four bays. It contains a cart entry with composite jambs and an altered lintel flanked by doorways, and above it is a Venetian window and rectangular vents. In the left return is a blocked doorway with a chamfered surround, and a semicircular-arched pitching hole with a dated keystone. (Note: Street View in June 2011 shows that the barn has been converted for residential use.)	II
Crabtree Fold, Old Town House and barn 53.75110°N 2.00237°W	—	Late 18th century	A pair of back to back houses with an attached barn in stone with quoins, and a stone slate roof with coped gables and kneelers. There are two storeys and a north front of three bays. The windows are mullioned and the doorway has monolithic jambs. The barn has a semicircular-arched cart entry with a Venetian window above, and three round-arched vents to the left.	II
Middle Small Shaw; 53.77231°N 2.01163°W	—	Late 18th century	A stone house with quoins, and a stone slate roof with coped gables and kneelers. There are two storeys, three bays, and a rear outshut. The windows are mullioned, the original doorway in the left return, which is blocked, has monolithic jambs, and in the outshut is a doorway with tie-stone jambs.	II
Near Bent Head Farmhouse and barn 53.76502°N 2.01146°W	—	Late 18th century	A laithe house in stone with quoins, and a stone slate roof with coped gables and kneelers. The house has two storeys, a wide gabled porch that has a doorway with tie-stone jambs, and mullioned windows. On the front of the barn is a segmental-arched cart entry with a small Venetian window above, and at the rear is a cart entry with composite jambs, and a monolithic lintel.	II
Wheat Ing Bridge; 53.77012°N 2.01932°W		Late 18th century (probable)	An accommodation bridge over Crimsworth Dean Beck, it is in stone, and consists of a single segmental arch with a coped parapet.	II
Wheat Ing; 53.77022°N 2.01847°W		c. 1780	A row of three cottages combined into one house, it is in stone and has a stone slate roof with coped gables with kneelers. There are two storeys and three bays. The windows are chamfered and mullioned with three lights, the middle light taller. Each bay has a doorway with monolithic jambs.	II
9, 11 and 12 Black Hill Bottom; 53.76240°N 2.00566°W	—	18th to early 19th century	A group of stone cottages with quoins, and stone slate roofs with kneelers. There are two storeys and attics, and two bays on the west front. The windows are mullioned, some doorways have tie-stone jambs, and others have monolithic jambs.	II
Higher Crimsworth; 53.76402°N 2.00982°W	—	Late 18th to early 19th century	A row of back to back cottages converted into two dwellings. They are in stone with quoins and a stone slate roof with coped gables. The doorways have tie-stone jambs, and the windows are mullioned.	II
New Bridge; 53.75800°N 2.01918°W		18th to early 19th century	The bridge carries a road over Hebden Water. It is in stone, and consists of a single segmental arch. The bridge has a keystone, a band, a parapet and copings.	II
1, 2, 3 and 4 Lower Chiserley; 53.74939°N 1.99704°W	—	1810	A row of stone cottages with quoins at the rear and a stone slate roof. There are three storeys, a double-depth plan, and five bays. No. 4 has a doorway with monolithic jambs and a dated lintel, the other doorways have tie-stone jambs, and the windows are mullioned.	II
Table tomb and railings 53.75512°N 2.00400°W	—	1817	The tomb is in the churchyard of Wainsgate Baptist Church, and is to the memory of John Fawcett. It is a table tomb in stone on a moulded plinth, with incised sides and a large overlapping inscribed slab. The tomb is enclosed by three dwarf stone walls with coping and cast iron rod railings with spear finials, and there is an opening at the west end.	II
Latham Farmhouse and barn 53.75482°N 1.99102°W	—	1818	A laithe house that was extended in 1828, it is in stone, and has a stone slate roof with coped gables and kneelers. The house has two storeys and two bays, mullioned windows, and a doorway with tie-stone jambs. In the barn is an elliptical-arched cart entry with a Venetian window above, a doorway to the left, and a blocked doorway to the right with a datestone.	II
Milestone opposite Crimsworth Lane; 53.76477°N 2.00971°W		c. 1820	The milestone is on the northeast side of Keighley road (A6033 road). It is an arched stone with two faces below, and is inscribed in cast iron lettering. In the arched top is "LEES AND HEBDEN BRIDGE ROAD" "WADSWORTH", on the faces are the distances to Hebden Bridge and Keighley, and on the sloping top between are details of the manufacturer.	II
Plumpton Farmhouse; 53.76536°N 2.00118°W	—	c. 1820	The farmhouse was extended in 1846. It is in stone with quoins and a stone slate roof. There are two storeys, three bays, and a single-storey rear outshut. The windows are mullioned, and the window in the outshut has a dated lintel. The doorway on the front has a tie-stone jamb and a monolithic jamb, and in the right return is a gabled porch and a doorway with tie-stone jambs.	II
South Shields Farmhouse and barn 53.76647°N 1.99452°W	—	c. 1820	A laithe house in stone with quoins, and a stone slate roof with coped gables and kneelers. The house has two storeys and a cellar, two bays, a central gabled porch and a doorway with tie-stone jambs, and mullioned windows. The barn is to the left, on the front is a semicircular-arched cart entry and a doorway with tie-stone jambs, and at the rear is a cart entry with a monolithic lintel.	II
1-6 Green End and barn 53.75086°N 2.00008°W		1825	A row of six cottages and an attached barn, they are in stone with quoins, and a stone slate roof with coped gables and kneelers. There are two storeys, and each cottage has a doorway with tie-stone jambs, and mullioned windows. The barn to the right contains a segmental-arched cart entry with a Venetian window above, and to the right is a doorway with tie-stone jambs and a monolithic lintel. In the right return is a semicircular-arched window with an initialled and dated lintel.	II
1 Old Town Hall Cottages; 53.75151°N 2.00294°W	—	Early 19th century	A stone house that has a stone slate roof with coped gables and kneelers. There are two storeys and a rear outshut. The windows are mullioned, on the front is a blocked doorway with tie-stone jambs, and there is another doorway in the outshut.	II
1–5 Wainsgate Lane; 53.75431°N 2.00439°W	—	Early 19th century	A row of stone cottages with a stone slate roof. There are two storeys and four bays. The doorways have tie-stone jambs and the windows are mullioned. No. 1 projects and has quoins.	II
Boston Hill Cottages; 53.75325°N 2.00501°W	—	Early 19th century	A row of four cottages combined into two houses, they are in stone with quoins and a stone slate roof. There are two storeys and four bays. The windows are mullioned and the doorways have tie-stone jambs. No. 3 projects under a catslide roof and contains a blocked taking-in door.	II
Bridge at Holme Ends; 53.78561°N 2.06883°W		Early 19th century	The bridge carries a track over Alcomden Water. It is in stone, and consists of two segmental arches. The bridge has bull-nosed cutwaters, a band, and a parapet with copings.	II
Clough; 53.74818°N 1.95899°W	—	Early 19th century	A pair of mirror-image cottages combined into one dwelling, it is in stone with a stone slate roof. There are two storeys and two bays. The windows are mullioned, and the doorways have tie-stone jambs.	II
Club Houses; 53.74936°N 2.00062°W		Early 19th century	A row of six stone cottages. No. 6 has a tile roof and the other roofs are in stone slate. Nos. 1, 2 and 3 have three storeys, Nos. 4, 5 and 6 are lower and have two storeys. Each cottage has one bay, a doorway with tie-stone jambs, and mullioned windows. In the right return are two doorways at ground level and steps leading up to a doorway in the middle floor.	II
Coppy Farmhouse and barn 53.77891°N 2.02103°W	—	Early 19th century	A laithe house in stone with quoins, and a stone slate roof with gables and kneelers. The house has two storeys and two bays, mullioned windows, and a doorway with tie-stone jambs. The barn has an arched cart entry and doorways with tie-stone jambs.	II
Gib Farmhouse; 53.77673°N 2.01001°W	—	Early 19th century	The farmhouse is in stone with quoins, a stone slate roof, and two storeys. The windows are mullioned, and there are two doorways with tie-stone jambs, one of which is blocked.	II
Holme Ends Farmhouse and attached barn 53.78564°N 2.06965°W		Early 19th century	A laithe house in stone with quoins and a stone slate roof. The cottage has two storeys, one bay and mullioned windows. In the barn is a segmental-arched cart entry, a small rectangular opening to the right, and two blocked doorways with tie-stone jambs.	II
New Delight; 53.76772°N 2.01050°W		Early 19th century	A row of five stone cottages with quoins and a stone slate roof. There are two storeys and five bays. The windows are mullioned, and each cottage has a doorway with tie-stone jambs.	II
Over Wood Farmhouse and barn 53.77893°N 2.05063°W		Early 19th century	A two-cottage laithe house, it is in stone with quoins and a stone slate roof. The cottages have two storeys, and each cottage has one bay, a doorway with a monolithic jamb, and mullioned windows. The barn to the left has a semicircular-arched cart entry with an impost and monolithic jambs.	II
Raw Holme Farmhouse and Holme Cottage; 53.75428°N 2.01067°W	—	Early 19th century	A row of four cottages, later combined into two dwellings, in stone with quoins and a stone slate roof. They are built back to earth with two storeys at the front and one at the rear. The doorways have tie-stone jambs, and the windows are mullioned.	II
Robin Hood Inn; 53.76152°N 2.00530°W		Early 19th century	The public house is in stone with quoins, an eaves band, and a stone slate roof. There are two storeys and a symmetrical front of three bays. The central doorway has interrupted jambs, and the windows have plain surrounds. Above the door is a decorative tablet, the left return contains a Venetian window, and in the right return are two five-light mullioned windows.	II
1 Pecket Bar; 53.76069°N 2.00663°W	—	c. 1830	A former toll house, later a private house, it is in stone with quoins and a stone slate roof. There are two storeys and one bay. The doorway is to the right, and in each floor are two-light mullioned windows.	II
2, 3 and 4 Pecket Bar; 53.76057°N 2.00669°W	—	c. 1830	A row of three stone cottages, one of which was once a smithy. They have been combined into a single house, and have quoins and a stone slate roof. There are two storeys and three bays. The doorways have tie-stone jambs, and the windows are mullioned.	II
Pinfold; 53.76221°N 2.00516°W	—	c. 1830	The pinfold is adjacent to Keighley Road and is in stone. It contains quoins, the wall facing the road is embattled, and the entrance is in the north wall.	II
Crimsworth Methodist Church; 53.76319°N 2.00532°W		1834	The chapel is in stone with quoins and a stone slate roof. There are two storeys, and the front has three bays, and a pedimented gable with an inscription in the tympanum. In the centre is a doorway with pilasters, and a cornice. There are four bays on the sides, and the windows on the front and sides have semicircular-arched heads, impost blocks, and keystones.	II
1 and 2 Chiserley Hall and archway 53.75006°N 1.99802°W	—	Early to mid-19th century	A pair of stone cottages with a stone slate roof. There are two storeys, and each cottage has a single bay, a doorway with tie-stone jambs, and mullioned windows. In the apex of the left return is a columbarium. Attached to No. 2 is an elliptical archway with rusticated voussoirs leading to a courtyard.	II
8–13 Keighley Road; 53.76109°N 2.00637°W	—	Early to mid-19th century	A row of six cottages, raised above the level of the road, they are in stone with quoins and a stone slate roof. There are two storeys and each cottage has one bay, a doorway with sill-tie jambs, and mullioned windows.	II
Bent Head Farmhouse and barn 53.76575°N 2.01175°W		Early to mid-19th century	A laithe house with three cottages, later converted into one dwelling. It is in stone and has a stone slate roof with a coped gable on the left. The former cottages have two storeys, three bays, mullioned windows, and three doorways with tie-stone jambs. The former barn has a segmental-arched cart entry with a Venetian window above, paired doorways with tie-stone jambs, and in the left gable end is a pitching hole converted into a window.	II
Guide post at junction with A6033; 53.76968°N 2.01074°W		Early to mid-19th century	The guide post is on the west side of the A6033 road. It is an upright stone with inscriptions on two faces, consisting of "OLD ROAD", pointing hands, and the directions to Haworth, Keighley and Hebden Bridge.	II
Guide post at junction of Akroyd Lane with Keighley Road; 53.76069°N 2.00678°W		Early to mid-19th century	The guide post standing at a road junction is an upright stone with two inscribed faces. It is inscribed with " PARISH OF WADSWORTH " and pointing hands indicating the directions to Old Town, Hebden Bridge, Midgley, Todmorden, Halifax, Haworth, Keighley, and Oxenhope.	II
Barn south of 2 Chiserley Hall; 53.74989°N 1.99802°W	—	1837	The barn is in stone with quoins, and a stone slate roof with coped gables and kneelers. It contains an elliptical-arched cart entry with rusticated voussoirs flanked by doorways, and in the right return is an owl hole and a dated inscription.	II
Barn east of Ibbot Royd Farmhouse; 53.74802°N 1.99931°W	—	1838	A stone barn that has a stone slate roof with a coped gable and kneelers. It contains an elliptical-arched cart entry, above it is a Venetian window with an impost, a false keystone and a dated lintel, and to the sides are doorways with tie-stone jambs and small windows. In the right gable end are arrow slit vents, and an owl hole in the apex.	II
Pecket Well Mill; 53.76357°N 2.00571°W		c. 1840	A former fustian weaving mill that has been converted into flats. The buildings are in stone and consist of the mill, a weaving shed, an engine room, and a chimney. The mill has quoins, a slate roof, three storeys, a symmetrical front of three bays, and sides of nine bays. The doorway has monolithic jambs and a cornice on consoles, and there are two taking-in bays. The chimney is circular and tapering, the engine house has a semicircular-arched window and a hipped roof, and the shed has a semicircular-arched entry, a hoist, and seven circular holes.	II
Barn and cottage south-east of Plumpton Farmhouse; 53.76519°N 2.00113°W	—	1843	A laithe house in stone that has a slate roof with a coped gable. The cottage has two storeys, one bay, and an outshut. It contains mullioned windows and a doorway in the outshut. The barn is higher and has a symmetrical front consisting of a central elliptical-arched cart entry with a keystone, above it is a Venetian window with a false keystone and a dated lintel, and to the sides are doorways and small windows. In the left gable end are arrow slit vents, and an oculus in the apex.	II
Guide post at junction with Akroyd Lane and Patrock Lane; 53.75400°N 2.00471°W		Mid-19th century	The guide post is a horizontal stone at a road junction, engraved with a pointing hand and "OLD TOWN".	II
Guide post at junction with Walker Lane; 53.75107°N 2.00055°W		Mid-19th century	The guide post is a stone set into a dry stone wall at a road junction. It is engraved with a pointing hand and "OLD TOWN".	II
Milestone north of junction with Midgehole Road; 53.75328°N 2.00861°W		Mid-19th century	The milestone is on the east side of Keighley road (A6033 road). It is in cast iron, it has a triangular plan and a sloping top. The milestone is inscribed with the distances to Hebden Bridge and Keighley.	II
Old Town Mill; 53.75213°N 2.00348°W		1851	The former worsted mill, which was extended in 1881 and 1889, and has since been used for other purposes, is in gritstone with roofs of slate and corrugated iron. The mill consists of the former spinning mill, a warehouse, boiler and engine rooms, a chimney and sheds. The original mill has two storeys and an attic, with sides of ten and seven bays, a sill band, a modillion eaves cornice and coped gables with kneelers. The boiler house has a single bay and a hipped roof, the chimney stack is cylindrical, the warehouse has four storeys and attic and is ten bays long, and there is a stair tower with a pyramidal roof.	II
Wainsgate Baptist Church and Sunday School; 53.75555°N 2.00415°W		1859	The chapel and Sunday school are in stone with quoins and slate roofs. The chapel has two storeys and a symmetrical front of three bays, with a moulded eaves cornice, and a pedimented gable. The central doorway has panelled pilasters, a fanlight, spandrels, a moulded cornice, and a date plaque above. There are four bays on the sides, and the windows are archivolt-arched with architraves and keystones. The school at the rear has two storeys, six bays, straight-headed windows, and two doorways with monolithic jambs and cornices on consoles, one of which is blocked. At the north end is a gable with kneelers, and in the gable is a Venetian window.	II*
Gatehouse, Castle Carr; 53.76729°N 1.96936°W		1860	The gatehouse to Castle Carr, now demolished, is a ruin in stone and without a roof. The gatehouse has three storeys, and contains an arched gateway containing a cast iron portcullis and oak gates with wrought iron grills. There is an embattled parapet with false machicolations, arrow slits, clasping buttresses, and a mullioned window. In the corner is a stair tower, and at the rear are more archways, an oriel window containing a cross window with canted sides on dated corbels, above which is a heraldic shield.	II
Barn east of Wilcroft House; 53.76306°N 2.00719°W	—	1861	A stone barn with a stone slate roof. On the front is an elliptical-arched cart entry with rusticated voussoirs, above it is a small window with a dated lintel, to the right is a doorway with sill-tie jambs and a small window, and there are two lunettes with keystones. In the left gable end is an owl hole, and at the rear are quoins, a segmental-arched cart entry and two doorways, all with chamfered surrounds.	II
Height Lodge, Castle Carr; 53.76084°N 1.95914°W		Mid to late 19th century	This consists of a pair of stone lodges joined by an archway, all embattled. Each lodge has two storeys, and between them is a Norman archway.	II
Low Lodge, Castle Carr; 53.75859°N 1.96774°W		c. 1868	This consists of a pair of stone lodges joined by an archway. Each lodge has two storeys with mullioned windows, an embattled parapet with stepped crenellation carried on false machicolation, a Tudor arched doorway with sunken spandrels, a tall stair tower with arrow slits, and a single-storey bay at the rear. Between the lodges is a semicircular archway with zig-zag ornament, on colonnettes, a hood mould, and stepped crenellation surmounted by a large finial.	II
Former Sunday School; 53.76295°N 2.00552°W		1868	The former Sunday school is in stone with rusticated quoins, an eaves band, and a stone slate roof. There is one two storey at the front facing the road, and two at the rear. The front is symmetrical with three bays, and it has a triangular pedimented gable with a plaque in the tympanum, a central doorway with monolithic jambs, a fanlight, and a cornice on consoles, and this is flanked by tall round-headed windows with architraves and keystones. Along the sides are five bays and segmental-headed windows.	II
Water Garden and Pumphouse, Castle Carr; 53.76679°N 1.96538°W		1868–72	An ornamental water garden between two reservoirs, the central feature being a pool with a jet fountain fed by a stepped cascade flanked by staircases. Around it are four smaller pools with jet fountains, and to the northwest is another pool and an octagonal pumphouse. The pumphouse is in stone with a chamfered plinth, a bracketed cornice, and a chamfered parapet, and it contains a doorway with an inscribed lintel and gable. Other features include waterfalls, viewing platforms, and another cascade to the lower reservoir.	II
Ventilation shaft (east} 53.76027°N 1.98184°W}		1870s	The ventilation shaft is for an underground water conduit. It is in stone with a plinth and a cornice, it is circular, and about 10 feet (3.0 m) high. The shaft contains four openings with iron grills.	II
Ventilation shaft (west} 53.76070°N 1.98838°W}		1870s	The ventilation shaft is for an underground water conduit. It is in stone with a plinth and a cornice, it is circular, and about 10 feet (3.0 m) high. The shaft contains four openings with iron grills.	II
Wadsworth War Memorial; 53.75974°N 2.01360°W		1923	The war memorial is on the top of a hill, and is in sandstone. It is 12.5 metres (41 ft) high, and consists of an obelisk on a stepped base, on a square pedestal, all on a square stone base. The south face of the pedestal is recessed, and contains four tablets with inscriptions and the names of those lost in the two World Wars.	II

== Notes and references ==
=== Sources ===
- Historic England, "Greenwood Stone, Wadsworth (1227651)", National Heritage List for England
- Historic England, "Akroyd Farmhouse and Akroyd Farm Cottage, Wadsworth (1226935)", National Heritage List for England
- Historic England, "Lower Small Shaw Farmhouse and attached barn, Wadsworth (1227000)", National Heritage List for England
- Historic England, "Stone Booth Farmhouse and Stone Booth Cottage, Wadsworth (1265490)", National Heritage List for England
- Historic England, "Lower Crimsworth Farmhouse, Wadsworth (1226994)", National Heritage List for England
- Historic England, "Grain, Wadsworth (1226998)", National Heritage List for England
- Historic England, "Nos. 3, 4 and 5 Chiserley Hall, Wadsworth (1227305)", National Heritage List for England
- Historic England, "Far Nook, Wadsworth (1265494)", National Heritage List for England
- Historic England, "Haworth Hall and attached barn, Wadsworth (1227001)", National Heritage List for England
- Historic England, "Old Town Hall, Old Town Hall Cottages and attached gateway, Wadsworth (1227155)", National Heritage List for England
- Historic England, "Upper Small Shaw Farmhouse and attached barn, Wadsworth (1227093)", National Heritage List for England
- Historic England, "Old Town Farmhouse and attached barn, Wadsworth (1227304)", National Heritage List for England
- Historic England, "Cross Ends Farmhouse and attached barn, Wadsworth (1226997)", National Heritage List for England
- Historic England, "Ibbot Royd Farmhouse, Wadsworth (1235128)", National Heritage List for England
- Historic England, "Middle Nook and attached barn, Wadsworth (1227153)", National Heritage List for England
- Historic England, "Crimsworth Farmhouse and attached barn, Wadsworth (1226833)", National Heritage List for England
- Historic England, "Barn 10 metres to north of Grain, Wadsworth (1226996)", National Heritage List for England
- Historic England, "House 20 metres to south-south-east of Hill Top, Wadsworth (1227395)", National Heritage List for England
- Historic England, "Horse Hey Farmhouse and attached barn, Wadsworth (1265530)", National Heritage List for England
- Historic England, "Lane Head, Wadsworth (1227396)", National Heritage List for England
- Historic England, "Lower Purprice, Wadsworth (1265382)", National Heritage List for England
- Historic England, "Nook Farmhouse and attached barn, Wadsworth (1227154)", National Heritage List for England
- Historic England, "Purprice Farmhouse, Wadsworth (1227393)", National Heritage List for England
- Historic England, "Barn 5 metres to east of Gib Farmhouse, Wadsworth (1227002)", National Heritage List for England
- Historic England, "Lumb Bridge, Wadsworth (1265493)", National Heritage List for England
- Historic England, "Wilcroft Farmhouse and eastern part of Wilcroft House, Wadsworth (1265381)", National Heritage List for England
- Historic England, "White Hole, Wadsworth (1227643)", National Heritage List for England
- Historic England, "Crimsworth Cottage and attached barn, Wadsworth (1265678)", National Heritage List for England
- Historic England, "Crabtree Fold Farmhouse, Wadsworth (1265417)", National Heritage List for England
- Historic England, "Building 5 metres to north-east of barn attached to Middle Nook, Wadsworth (1227268)", National Heritage List for England
- Historic England, "Carrs Cottage, Wadsworth (1227394)", National Heritage List for England
- Historic England, "Bee-boles in wall to east of Over Wood Farmhouse, Wadsworth (1265419)", National Heritage List for England
- Historic England, "Old Town Farm Cottages, Wadsworth (1227340)", National Heritage List for England
- Historic England, "Building 20 metres to south of Pecket Well Mill Shed, Wadsworth (1227148)", National Heritage List for England
- Historic England, "Field Head Barn belonging to Owlers, Wadsworth (1265383)", National Heritage List for England
- Historic England, "Pasture Farmhouse and attached barn, Wadsworth (1227003)", National Heritage List for England
- Historic England, "Upper Mytholm Farmhouse and attached barn, Wadsworth (1227038)", National Heritage List for England
- Historic England, "Nos. 1-3, Old Town Hall Court, Wadsworth (1265416)", National Heritage List for England
- Historic England, "Crabtree Fold, Old Town House and attached barn, Wadsworth (1227303)", National Heritage List for England
- Historic England, "Middle Small Shaw, Wadsworth (1265572)", National Heritage List for England
- Historic England, "Near Bent Head Farmhouse and attached barn, Wadsworth (1227150)", National Heritage List for England
- Historic England, "Wheat Ing Bridge, Wadsworth (1227617)", National Heritage List for England
- Historic England, "Wheat Ing, Wadsworth (1265384)", National Heritage List for England
- Historic England, "Nos. 9, 11 and 12 Black Hill Bottom, Wadsworth (1227308)", National Heritage List for England
- Historic England, "Higher Crimsworth, Wadsworth (1226986)", National Heritage List for England
- Historic England, "New Bridge, Wadsworth (1227262)", National Heritage List for England
- Historic England, "Nos. 1, 2, 3, and 4 Lower Chiserley, Wadsworth (1227354)", National Heritage List for England
- Historic England, "Table-tomb and surrounding railings to John Fawcett's Grave in Wainsgate Baptist Church graveyard, Wadsworth (1235114)", National Heritage List for England
- Historic England, "Latham Farmhouse and attached barn, Wadsworth (1265492)", National Heritage List for England
- Historic England, "Milestone opposite junction with Crimsworth Lane, Wadsworth (1265491)", National Heritage List for England
- Historic England, "Plumpton Farmhouse, Wadsworth (1227389)", National Heritage List for England
- Historic England, "South Shields Farmhouse and attached barn, Wadsworth (1226999)", National Heritage List for England
- Historic England, "Nos. 1–6 Green End and attached barn, Wadsworth (1227401)", National Heritage List for England
- Historic England, "No. 1 Old Town Hall Cottages, Wadsworth (1227302)", National Heritage List for England
- Historic England, "Nos. 1–5 Wainsgate Lane, Wadsworth (1227400)", National Heritage List for England
- Historic England, "Boston Hill Cottages, Wadsworth (1227292)", National Heritage List for England
- Historic England, "Bridge at Holme Ends over Alcomden Water, Wadsworth (1235132)", National Heritage List for England
- Historic England, "Clough, Wadsworth (1226828)", National Heritage List for England
- Historic England, "Club Houses, Wadsworth (1235127)", National Heritage List for England
- Historic England, "Coppy Farmhouse and attached barn, Wadsworth (1226980)", National Heritage List for England
- Historic England, "Gib Farmhouse, Wadsworth (1265510)", National Heritage List for England
- Historic England, "Holme Ends Farmhouse and attached barn, Wadsworth (1265200)", National Heritage List for England
- Historic England, "New Delight, Wadsworth (1227005)", National Heritage List for England
- Historic England, "Over Wood Farmhouse and attached barn, Wadsworth (1227366)", National Heritage List for England
- Historic England, "Raw Holme Farmhouse and Holme Cottage, Wadsworth (1227152)", National Heritage List for England
- Historic England, "The Robin Hood Inn, Wadsworth (1227004)", National Heritage List for England
- Historic England, "Top O'th Hill, Wadsworth (1227306)", National Heritage List for England
- Historic England, "No. 1 Pecket Bar, Wadsworth (1227307)", National Heritage List for England
- Historic England, "Nos. 2, 3 and 4 Pecket Bar, Wadsworth (1227388)", National Heritage List for England
- Historic England, "Pinfold 10 metres to east of No. 4 Black Hill, Wadsworth (1227143)", National Heritage List for England
- Historic England, "Crimsworth Methodist Church, Wadsworth (1227145)", National Heritage List for England
- Historic England, "Nos. 1 and 2 Chiserley Hall and archway attached to No. 2, Wadsworth (1265402)", National Heritage List for England
- Historic England, "Nos. 8–12 Keighley Road, Wadsworth (1265574)", National Heritage List for England
- Historic England, "Bent Head Farmhouse and attached barn, Wadsworth (1227149)", National Heritage List for England
- Historic England, "Guide post at junction with A6033, Wadsworth (1265571)", National Heritage List for England
- Historic England, "Guide post opposite No. 1 at junction of Akroyd Lane with Keighley Road, Wadsworth (1265412)", National Heritage List for England
- Historic England, "Barn 10 metres to south of No. 2 Chiserley Hall, Wadsworth (1265418)", National Heritage List for England
- Historic England, "Barn at right angles 5 metres to east of Ibbot Royd Farmhouse, Wadsworth (1235131)", National Heritage List for England
- Historic England, "Pecket Well Mill, Wadsworth (1227147)", National Heritage List for England
- Historic England, "Barn and attached cottage 10 metres to south-east of Plumpton Farmhouse, Wadsworth (1227309)", National Heritage List for England
- Historic England, "Guide post at junction with Akroyd Lane and Patrock Lane, Wadsworth (1265495)", National Heritage List for England
- Historic England, "Guide post at junction with Walker Lane, Wadsworth (1227290)", National Heritage List for England
- Historic England, "Milestone on east side of road ½ mile (approximately) to north of junction with Midgehole Road, Wadsworth (1227142)", National Heritage List for England
- Historic England, "Old Town Mill, Wadsworth (1422136)", National Heritage List for England
- Historic England, "Wainsgate Baptist Church and attached Sunday School, Wadsworth (1227399)", National Heritage List for England
- Historic England, "Gatehouse to Castle Carr, Wadsworth (1227430)", National Heritage List for England
- Historic England, "Barn 5 metres to east of Wilcroft House, Wadsworth (1227392)", National Heritage List for England
- Historic England, "Height Lodge and archway, Wadsworth (1133924)", National Heritage List for England
- Historic England, "Low Lodge at Castle Carr, Wadsworth (1227151)", National Heritage List for England
- Historic England, "Sunday School of Crimsworth Wesleyan Methodist Church, Wadsworth (1227146)", National Heritage List for England
- Historic England, "Castle Carr Water Garden, and Pumphouse, Wadsworth (1272650)", National Heritage List for England
- Historic England, "Ventilation shaft for Castle Carr Tunnel 400 metres east of Weavers Gate Footpath, Wadsworth (1227709)", National Heritage List for England
- Historic England, "Ventilation shaft for Castle Carr Tunnel 200 metres west of Weavers Gate Footpath, Wadsworth (1227398)", National Heritage List for England
- Historic England, "Wadsworth War Memorial, Wadsworth (1464951)", National Heritage List for England
- Historic England, Listed Buildings
- Harman, Ruth; Pevsner, Nikolaus (2017), Yorkshire West Riding: Sheffield and the South, The Buildings of England, New Haven and London: Yale University Press, ISBN 978-0-300-22468-9
