= Hepton Rural District =

Former local government area in the UK

Coordinates: 53.747°N 2.017°W

Hepton was a rural district in the West Riding of Yorkshire, England, from 1894 to 1974.

The district included four civil parishes:

- Heptonstall,
- Blackshaw
- Erringden
- Wadsworth

It was created in 1894 as the Todmorden rural district. It was renamed in the 1930s and survived until 1974, when, under the Local Government Act 1972 it was abolished and became part of the Calderdale metropolitan borough in West Yorkshire.
