= Tadcaster Rural District =

Former local government area in the UK

Coordinates: 53.883°N 1.264°W

Tadcaster Rural District was a rural district in the West Riding of Yorkshire from 1894 to 1974. It was named after Tadcaster.

It was created by the Local Government Act 1894 (56 & 57 Vict. c. 73) from the Tadcaster rural sanitary district. It was enlarged in 1937 by the abolition of Bishopthorpe Rural District.

It was abolished in 1974 under the Local Government Act 1972. The parishes of Aberford, Austhorpe, Barwick in Elmet and Scholes, Great and Little Preston, Ledsham, Ledston, Lotherton cum Aberford, Micklefield, Parlington, Sturton Grange and Swillington became part of the Metropolitan District of Leeds in West Yorkshire, with the rest going to the district of Selby in North Yorkshire.

== See also ==
- Local Government Act 1972
