= Colden, West Yorkshire =

Hamlet in West Yorkshire, England

Coordinates: 53.753°N 2.0569°W

Colden
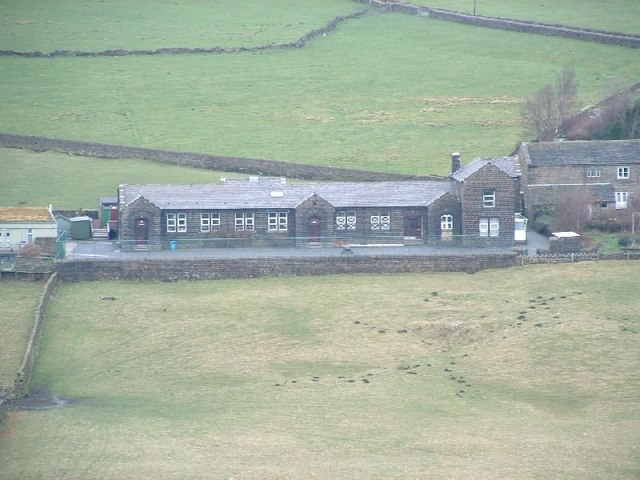
- Colden School (2006)

- Location within West Yorkshire
- Civil parish: Heptonstall
- Metropolitan borough: Calderdale
- Metropolitan county: West Yorkshire
- Region: Yorkshire and the Humber
- Country: England
- Sovereign state: United Kingdom

Colden is a hamlet in the civil parish of Heptonstall in Calderdale, West Yorkshire, England. Historically part of the West Riding of Yorkshire, the hamlet consists of scattered houses and farms on high ground west of Heptonstall, above the valley of Colden Water.

Colden School is a junior and infants school established in 1878.

Colden Water is crossed by two old footbridges, possibly dating from the 17th century. Strines Bridge is a packhorse bridge, and lower down a clapper bridge crosses the stream. Both are Grade II listed buildings.

The Pennine Way and Calderdale Way both pass through Colden.

== See also ==
- Listed buildings in Blackshaw
