= East Hardwick =

Village and civil parish in West Yorkshire, England

Coordinates: 53.661085°N 1.300682°W

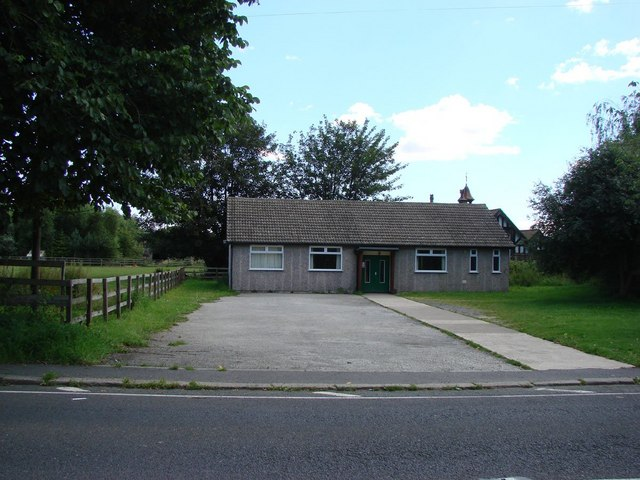
- Village Hall

- Location within West Yorkshire
- Population: 173 (2011 census)
- Civil parish: East Hardwick
- Metropolitan borough: City of Wakefield
- Metropolitan county: West Yorkshire
- Region: Yorkshire and the Humber
- Country: England
- Sovereign state: United Kingdom
- Post town: PONTEFRACT
- Postcode district: WF8
- Dialling code: 01977
- Police: West Yorkshire
- Fire: West Yorkshire
- Ambulance: Yorkshire
- UK Parliament: Normanton, Pontefract and Castleford

East Hardwick is a village and civil parish in the City of Wakefield in West Yorkshire, England. It has a population of 173, as of the 2011 census. Until 1974 it was part of Osgoldcross Rural District.

== History ==
The name 'East Hardwick' has its origins in Old English. The 'East' distinguishes it from West Hardwick, and 'Hardwick' comes from the Old English phrase heorde-wīc, meaning a herd farm or a farm for livestock. It adjoins the line of the Roman Great North Road now linking Pontefract to the North with the A1 and Doncaster in the south.

The Domesday Book does not record the village, but documents from 1120 refer to a Herdwica, and in 1296 as Herdwyk. The name means herd farm, an area used for livestock instead of arable farming. The version spelled as East Hardwick first appeared in 1424.

The township, later civil parish of East Hardwick, lies in the ecclesiastical parish of Pontefract. It became an independent parish in 1871 and its church record dates from 1874. It is 2 miles (3.2 km) south of Pontefract, and 9.5 miles (15.3 km) east of Wakefield.

The earliest map dates from 1800 when the open fields were being enclosed. Two farms: Manor Farm and Norman's farm extended over 150 acres and records show cattle farming as well as wheat, oats, barley, potatoes and pea production.

In 1820, the Leeds to Barnsdale Bar turnpike opened through East Hardwick. This avoided traffic from Leeds having to travel through Garforth and Ferrybridge to get on the Great North Road going south. Tolls were collected until 1878.

Today East Hardwick consists of three main areas: the Kennels, around Doncaster Road, the hamlet of Hundhill, and the main part of the village located along Darrington road, a small winding road leading to the what is known locally as 'the Moor'. The village is still based around farming, although it is now a mixed community of residents.

The A639 road cuts through the western portion of the village, linking the settlement with Pontefract to the north and the A1 and Doncaster to the south-east.

There is also a small church, St Stephen's, and a village hall.

== Governance ==
Until 1974 the village was part of Osgoldcross Rural District in the West Riding of Yorkshire. It is now part of Wakefield Metropolitan District in West Yorkshire. It is represented at Westminster as part of the Normanton, Pontefract and Castleford Constituency.

Population of East Hardwick 1811–2011
| 1811 | 1821 | 1831 | 1841 | 1851 | 1861 | 1871 | 1881 | 1891 | 1901 | 1911 | 1921 | 1931 | 1951 | 1961 | 2001 | 2011 |
|---|---|---|---|---|---|---|---|---|---|---|---|---|---|---|---|---|
| 81 | 96 | 139 | 149 | 152 | 213 | 282 | 228 | 193 | 155 | 150 | 167 | 185 | 184 | 152 | 191 | 173 |

== See also ==
- Listed buildings in East Hardwick
