= Parlington =

Civil parish in Leeds, England

Coordinates: 53.819907°N 1.3625727°W

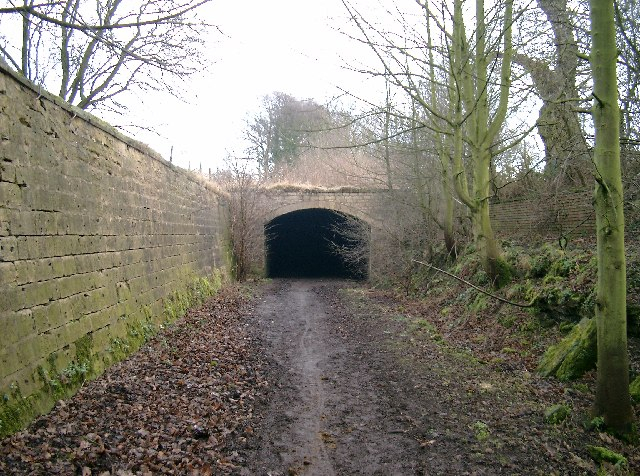

- Location within West Yorkshire
- Area: 7.17 km^{2} (2.77 sq mi)
- Population: 87 (2001 census)
  - Density: 12/km^{2} (31/sq mi)
- Civil parish: Parlington
- Metropolitan borough: Leeds
- Metropolitan county: West Yorkshire
- Region: Yorkshire and the Humber
- Country: England
- Sovereign state: United Kingdom
- Police: West Yorkshire
- Fire: West Yorkshire
- Ambulance: Yorkshire

Parlington is a civil parish that includes part of Aberford, in the City of Leeds in West Yorkshire, England. In 2001 the parish had a population of 87. The parish touches Aberford, Barwick in Elmet and Scholes, Lotherton cum Aberford, Micklefield and Sturton Grange. Aberford & District Parish Council includes Parlington along with Aberford, Lotherton cum Aberford and Sturton Grange. There are plans to build a garden village in Parlington.

== History ==
The name Parlington means farm or settlement connected with Pertel. Parlington was recorded in the Domesday Book as Perlinctune, Perlintun, Pertilinctun and Pertilintun.

Parlington is the site of a possible deserted medieval village. Hillam in the parish of Parlington has earthworks of a deserted medieval village.

Parlington was a township in the parish of Aberford, it became a separate parish in 1866.

=== Parlington Estate ===
The Parlington Estate holds a monument to the independence of the United States, built by Sir Thomas Gascoigne, last of the Gascoigne family blood line. It is inscribed on both elevations with the phrase "Liberty in N.America Triumphant MDCCLXXXIII". The 'Dark Arch', a short curved tunnel along Parlington Lane is reputed to be haunted. It was built c. 1813–14 to shield the residents of Parlington Hall from traffic passing along Parlington Lane, mostly horse drawn coal traffic on its way to the village distribution point for onward travel into the local market.

The lane was used for the private Aberford Railway, commonly called the "Fly Line", to transport coal from the Gascoigne's pits to Garforth. The railway closed in 1924. Parlington Hall was left to run to ruins after the death of Col F. C. T. Gascoigne in 1905, the hall was largely demolished in the 1950s and 1960s, leaving only the west wing intact. The estate was used by the army during the First and Second World Wars. The structures, built during the Second World War, still in existence in 2009, were constructed by the soldiers of No.3 Vehicle Repair Depot, part of Royal Army Ordnance Corps.

Nellie's Tree is a local landmark that was voted English and British Tree of the Year for 2018.

== Landmarks ==
There are 18 listed buildings in Parlington.

== See also ==
- Parlington Hall
