= Listed buildings in Hessle and Hill Top =

Hessle and Hill Top is a civil parish in the metropolitan borough of the City of Wakefield, West Yorkshire, England. The parish contains five listed buildings that are recorded in the National Heritage List for England. All the listed buildings are designated at Grade II, the lowest of the three grades, which is applied to "buildings of national importance and special interest". The listed buildings consist of a house, a pair of cottages, a forge, a road bridge, and a former toll house.

== Buildings ==
Name and location	Photograph	Date	Notes
Hessle Old Hall; 53.65072°N 1.34989°W		1641	A farmhouse, later a private house, in sandstone with quoins and a stone slate roof. There is an L-shaped plan, consisting of a main range with two storeys and a rear outshut, and a prominent projecting wing with two storeys and an attic. The doorway has a chamfered surround and a Tudor arched lintel inscribed with initials and a date. The windows are mullioned, there is a stair window, and an inserted dormer.
Forge Cottage and Rafters; 53.64895°N 1.38013°W	—	Late 18th century (probable)	A pair of cottages in brown brick with some sandstone, quoins, and a stone slate roof. There are two storeys, each cottage has two bays, and there is a continuous rear outshut. The windows include two sashes, one sliding, and the other windows have been altered.
The Old Forge; 53.64919°N 1.38043°W	—	Late 18th century	The forge is in sandstone and has a hipped stone slate roof. There is a single storey, a rectangular plan, six bays, and a lean-to extension on the right. In the left end wall is an elliptical-arched wagon entry covered by sliding doors. The windows are fixed, and at the rear is a doorway and an external brick furnace.
Little Went Bridge; 53.66339°N 1.35607°W	—	1811	The bridge carries Went Lane (B6428 road) over the River Went. It is in sandstone, and consists of a single semicircular arch. The bridge has rusticated voussoirs and keystones, raised bands, parapets, and rectangular terminal piers with rounded copings.
Bar House; 53.64582°N 1.36777°W		Early 19th century	The former toll house, now a private house, is sandstone with projecting eaves and a hipped stone slate roof. There is one storey and a symmetrical front of three bays. The middle bay projects, it is canted, and contains a doorway with a plain surround. The windows are mullioned, with two lights.
