= Barnsley Rural District =

Former rural district of Barnsley in the West Riding of Yorkshire, England

Coordinates: 53.553°N 1.481°W

Barnsley
- Area
  - 1894: 14,538 acres (58.83 km^{2})
  - 1911: 9,752 acres (39.46 km^{2})
  - 1931: 9,752 acres (39.46 km^{2})
- Population
  - 1901: 4,044
  - 1911: 4,124
  - 1931: 4,435
- History
  - Origin: Barnsley Rural Sanitary District
  - Created: 1894
  - Abolished: 1938
  - Succeeded by: County Borough of Barnsley, Hemsworth Rural District, Penistone Rural District, Wakefield Rural District
- Status: Rural district
- Government: Barnsley Rural District Council
  - HQ: Barnsley
- Subdivisions
  - Type: Civil parishes

Barnsley was a rural district in the West Riding of Yorkshire, England from 1894 to 1938. It encompassed the surrounding area but did not include the town of Barnsley.

== Creation ==
The district was formed by the Local Government Act 1894 as successor to the Barnsley Rural Sanitary District. A directly elected rural district council (RDC) replaced the previous rural sanitary authority, which had consisted of poor law guardians for the area. The district consisted of a number of rural parishes surrounding Barnsley. Barnsley did not form part of the rural district, as it was a municipal borough (a county borough from 1913).

== Boundary changes ==
The district lost territory and population due to three growing towns in its area being constituted as separate urban districts. Darfield (1901 population 3,408) and Royston (4,194) became urban districts in 1896, followed by Cudworth (3,408) in 1900.

== Civil parishes ==
The rural district initially consisted of eight civil parishes:

- Billingley
- Carlton
- Cudworth (until 1900)
- Darfield (until 1896)
- Notton
- Royston (until 1896)
- Stainborough
- Woolley

== Abolition ==
Under the Local Government Act 1929, county councils were obliged to review the districts into which their county was divided. The West Riding County Council made an order in 1938 abolishing Barnsley Rural District and redistributing its area among surrounding districts:

- Billingley passed to Hemsworth Rural District.
- Most of Carlton parish was absorbed by the County Borough of Barnsley, with an unpopulated area passing to Royston Urban District.
- Notton and Woolley were transferred to Wakefield Rural District, with small parts going to Darton Urban District.
- Stainbrough was transferred to Penistone Rural District.
