= Listed buildings in East Hardwick =

East Hardwick is a civil parish in the metropolitan borough of the City of Wakefield, West Yorkshire, England. The parish contains three listed buildings that are recorded in the National Heritage List for England. All the listed buildings are designated at Grade II, the lowest of the three grades, which is applied to "buildings of national importance and special interest". The parish contains the village of East Hardwick and the surrounding area. All the listed buildings are in the village, and consist of a house, a farmhouse, and a village pump.

== Buildings ==
| Name and location | Photograph | Date | Notes |
|---|---|---|---|
| Grange Farmhouse; 53.66113°N 1.30218°W | — | 17th century | The farmhouse, which was later extended, is in sandstone, partly pebbledashed and partly rendered, with pantile roofs. The earlier part has two storeys and two bays, the roof is hipped to the right, and it contains mullioned and inserted windows. External steps lead up to a doorway in the upper floor. The later part to the left has three storeys, a double depth plan, and two bays. The roof has coped gables with kneelers, and the doorways have plain surrounds. The windows are a mix; most are sashes, some of them sliding, some are casements, and there are mullioned windows with some mullions missing. |
| 9 Darrington Road; 53.66089°N 1.30364°W | — | 18th century | A sandstone house with a sill band and a pantile roof, three storeys, a double-depth plan, and one bay. In the ground floor is a doorway with a plain surround and a pitched canopy, and to the right is a Venetian window. The middle floor contains a three-light casement window with a plain surround and a keystone, and in the top floor is a two-light casement window. |
| Village pump 53.66071°N 1.30366°W | | 19th century (probable) | A shelter was erected around the pump in the 20th century. The pump is in lead and iron, it is encased in wooden cladding, and is about 1.5 metres (4 ft 11 in) high. On the north side is a lead spout, and on the south side an iron handle. The shelter is rectangular and open, and consists of four timber posts carrying a hipped tile roof with tile cresting. On the beams is decoration and an inscription. |
