= Listed buildings in Blackshaw =

Blackshaw is a civil parish in the metropolitan borough of Calderdale, West Yorkshire, England. It contains 45 listed buildings that are recorded in the National Heritage List for England. Of these, one is at Grade II*, the middle of the three grades, and the others are at Grade II, the lowest grade. The parish contains the small settlements of Blackshaw Head, Charlestown, and Colden, and is otherwise rural. Most of the listed buildings are houses and cottages, farmhouses, and farm buildings. The other listed buildings include bridges, a tenter ground and apiary, a public house, a guide post, a milestone, and a boundary stone.

== Key ==
Grade	Criteria
II*	Particularly important buildings of more than special interest
II	Buildings of national importance and special interest

== Buildings ==
Name and location	Photograph	Date	Notes	Grade
Lower Strines Farmhouse and Cottage; 53.75206°N 2.06556°W		Late 16th century	The oldest part is the wing, with the main range added in about 1600, and later divided into two dwellings. The building is in stone with a stone slate roof, and two storeys, and it consists of a hall range and a cross-wing. The wing projects slightly and contains chamfered windows with mullioned and arched lights, sunken spandrels, and hood moulds, and the windows in the main range have flat heads. The doorway at the junction with the wing has a moulded surround.	II
Manor House; 53.74179°N 2.03665°W	—	Late 16th century	The house was extended and much altered in the 18th century. It is in stone with a projecting plinth to the south, a moulded string course, and a stone slate roof with the remains of a coped gable and kneeler. There are two storeys, and an inserted cellar with outside steps. The house has two doorways, one with a heavy lintel. Most of the windows are mullioned and transomed, and there is an inserted dormer.	II
Lower Fieldhead Farmhouse and barn 53.75464°N 2.07057°W	—	1625	The house was rebuilt in the 19th century as a laithe house. It is in stone with quoins and a stone slate roof. There are two storeys, and the house has two bays. It has a doorway with a chamfered surround, composite jambs, and a dated lintel, and the windows are chamfered with mullions. In the barn is a semicircular-arched cart entry and a doorway.	II
Higher Murgatshaw Farmhouse; 53.74927°N 2.06270°W		Early 17th century	The farmhouse, which was extended and altered in the 18th century, is in stone with quoins and a stone slate roof with coped gables and kneelers. There are two storeys, a front of five bays, and a rear outshut. In the ground floor the right two bays contain Venetian windows with imposts and keystones. Most of the other windows are mullioned, and there are three doorways.	II
Hippins; 53.74002°N 2.06406°W		1650	A stone house on a plinth, with a string course, and a stone slate roof with coped gables and kneelers. There are two storeys and a T-shaped plan, consisting of a three-bay main range, and a rear kitchen wing. The doorway has a chamfered surround, an inscribed ogee lintel, and a decorative hood mould, and the windows are mullioned. At the rear is a porch, and a doorway with a chamfered surround and a depressed Tudor arched lintel.	II
Blackshaw Royd Farmhouse and barn 53.73894°N 2.05368°W	—	Mid 17th century (probable)	The barn is the older, the house being built later in the century. They are in stone, the barn has a roof of stone slate, and the roof of the house is in blue slate. The house has quoins, a coped gable, two storeys, and a double-pile plan. The windows are mullioned, and there are two doorways, one with a chamfered surround and an arched head, and the other with monolithic jambs which was inserted later. The barn has a single aisle on the west that has a square-headed cart entry with a heavy lintel in a portal with doorways, and there is a similar cart entry at the rear.	II
Strines Bridge; 53.75311°N 2.06332°W		17th century (possible)	A footbridge over the Colden Water, it is in stone, and consists of a single segmental arch. The bridge has a roughly dressed parapet, and steps lead up to it from both sides.	II
Field Head; 53.75363°N 2.07151°W	—	Late 17th century	The house was altered and refronted in 1765. It is in stone with a plinth on the south front, a moulded band, rusticated quoins, an eaves cornice with moulded brackets, and a stone slate roof that has gables with moulded copings. There are two storeys and seven bays. In the third bay is a doorway with an architrave, fluted pilasters, a pulvinated frieze, and a triangular pediment. The windows have architraves and moulded sills, and the window above the doorway has a keystone and a cornice. At the rear is an outshut and a single-bay extension, both with mullioned windows. Attached and parallel to the house is a barn that has a segmental-arched cart entries with chamfered surrounds and mullioned windows.	II*
Lower Moss Hall and barn 53.74427°N 2.07460°W	—	Late 17th century	The house was extended and the barn was added in the 18th century. The building is in stone with quoins and a stone slate roof. There are two storeys, and the house consists of a three-bay hall range and a gabled cross-wing to the left. On the front is a doorway with an architrave and a triangular pediment, an inserted doorway with monolithic jambs, and a blocked taking-in door. Some windows are mullioned, and others are square windows. The barn has a semicircular-arched cart entry with an impost block, an owl hole above, and a doorway with a chamfered surround and composite jambs.	II
Smithy Farmhouse, barn and cottage 53.74400°N 2.08563°W	—	Late 17th century	The building was extended in the 18th century, a laithe house was added in the 19th century, and it has all been converted into a single dwelling. It is in stone with quoins, and a roof with a coped gable to the west. The house has two storeys, a doorway with monolithic jambs, a three-light stepped window, and square windows. The barn to the right has an arched cart entry with monolithic jambs, a keystone, a Venetian window above, and mullioned windows to the right.	II
Potball; 53.73532°N 2.04766°W	—	1684	A stone house that has a stone slate roof with gables and kneelers. There are two storeys, four bays, and a single-storey outshut on the left. The windows are mullioned, some with hood moulds. At the rear are two doorways, one with a chamfered surround and a straight lintel, and the other, which is blocked, has a shaped lintel with the date in a tressure.	II
Crabtree Field; 53.76000°N 2.09298°W		Late 17th or early 18th century	A cottage is a derelict state in an isolated position. It is in stone with quoins and a stone slate roof. There are two storeys, and a single-storey extension. At the rear is a plinth, the windows were mullioned, and the doorways have monolithic jambs.	II
Hebble Hole Footbridge; 53.75007°N 2.04986°W		Late 17th or early 18th century (probable)	A clapper bridge that carries the Pennine Way over Colden Water. It consists of four monoliths in pairs, on a triangular cutwater. At the south end are two upright stones, and the bridge has a cast iron handrail.	II
Pannet Ing; 53.74205°N 2.05521°W	—	1734	A laithe house in stone with quoins and a stone slate roof. The house has two storeys, two bays, mullioned windows, and a rear doorway with monolithic jambs. The barn, under a lower roof line to the right, contains a square-headed cart entry with a chamfered surround and composite jambs. It has a single aisle with a catslide roof, a doorway with a quoined lintel, an owl hole in the right gable apex, and a datestone at the rear.	II
High Gate Farmhouse; 53.74353°N 2.05314°W	—	Early 18th century	A stone house with quoins and a stone slate roof. There are two storeys and two bays. The windows are mullioned, and include a 13-light window in the upper floor. There are two doorways with monolithic jambs, one of which has been converted into a window.	II
Marsh Farmhouse and barn 53.73772°N 2.04916°W	—	Early 18th century	The barn was added in the 19th century. The building is in stone, and has a stone slate roof with coped gables and kneelers. The house has two storeys and three bays. On the front is a later porch, and the windows are chamfered with mullions. The barn to the right contains a semicircular-arched cart entry flanked by doorways.	II
1/2 and 3 Badger Lane and 4 Lane Head; 53.74416°N 2.05652°W	—	Mid 18th century	Originally a workhouse, an L-shaped block was added to a cottage in about 1830. The building is in stone with a roof partly in stone slate and partly slated. There are two storeys with quoins, and the roof of the extension is hipped. Some of the windows are mullioned, and the doorways have monolithic jambs.	II
Beverley End tenter ground, apiary and cottage 53.73828°N 2.05654°W	—	18th century	An area containing terraces and walls forming a tenter ground, incorporating bee boles and other alcoves, and containing a ruined cottage. The structures are in gritstone, and the terraces are in dry stone. The former weaver's cottage consists of low walls, and a single room that incorporates a two-light mullioned window. To the northwest is an outbuilding, and to the southeast are the footings of another outbuilding.	II
Beverley Footbridge, Jumble Hole Clough; 53.73635°N 2.05651°W	—	18th century (probable)	A clapper bridge over a stream, it consists of a large square stone carried on rubble stones. The bridge has a cast iron post and a handrail.	II
Land Farmhouse and barn 53.75609°N 2.07048°W	—	1755	The barn was added to the farmhouse in about 1850, and further alterations were carried out in the 20th century. The house is in stone and has a blue slate roof with coped gables and kneelers. The windows are chamfered with mullions. The barn is at right angles, and contains a doorway with a chamfered surround and an ogee lintel, and mullioned and transomed windows. There is a semicircular-arched cart entry with a Venetian window above, and an inserted two-storey porch.	II
Hamer Cottage; 53.74473°N 2.06440°W		1770	Three cottages later combined into one house, it is in stone with quoins, a convex moulded gutter, and a stone slate roof. There are two storeys and three bays. The windows have raised surrounds, they are mullioned, and contain sashes. On the front is a gabled porch with a chamfered mullioned window, and to the right the original paired doors have been converted into windows, one with the date carved in the lintel.	II
Higher Underbank House; 53.73589°N 2.04701°W	—	c. 1770	A stone house on a plinth, with rusticated quoins, a band, an eaves cornice, and a stone slate roof with a coped gable and kneelers. There are two storeys and an attic, and a symmetrical front of three bays. The central doorway has an architrave, a pulvinated frieze, and a triangular pediment, and above it is a sash window. The other windows are double-chamfered with mullions. In the left return is a Venetian window with an impost and a false keystone, and at the rear is a cross window, and a taking-in door with an inscribed lintel. In the right return is a doorway with monolithic jambs.	II
Lower Rawtenstall Farmhouse; 53.74162°N 2.03731°W	—	Late 18th century	A stone farmhouse with quoins and a stone slate roof. There are two storeys and two bays, and the windows are mullioned.	II
Moorcroft; 53.74467°N 2.06499°W	—	Late 18th century	The house is in stone with quoins and a stone slate roof. There are two storeys and three bays. On the front is a gabled porch with kneelers. The windows are mullioned with the centre lights taller.	II
20 and 21 Underbank Avenue, Charlestown; 53.73403°N 2.04747°W		1788	A stone house on a plinth, with rusticated quoins, sill bands, and a stone slate roof with coped gables. There are two storeys and an attic, and a front of five bays. On the front are paired doorways with monolithic jambs, and sash windows. In the left return is a small semicircular-arched window with an impost block and keystone, above which is a Venetian window, and at the rear are stepped mullioned windows.	II
Lacy House; 53.73515°N 2.04470°W	—	1793	The house is in stone on a plinth, with quoins, an eaves band with gutter brackets, and a stone slate roof. There are two storeys and an attic, and a symmetrical five-bay front. Two steps lead up to the central doorway that has an architrave and a segmental pediment with the date in the tympanum. The windows on the front are sashes. In the return walls are Venetian windows, and at the rear is a doorway with monolithic jambs, a stair window with a semicircular-arched head, and mullioned windows.	II
Footbridge over the River Calder; 53.73607°N 2.04006°W	—	c. 1800	The footbridge over the River Calder links the towpath of the Rochdale Canal with Charlestown. It is in stone, and consists of a single shallow segmental arch. The bridge has voussoirs, and a curving parapet that has been repaired with concrete coping.	II
Slade Farmhouse and barn 53.75797°N 2.08077°W	—	1820	The barn was added in 1850. The building is in stone, and has a stone slate roof with a coped gable to the right. The house has two storeys, two bays, a doorway with a dated lintel, and mullioned windows. The barn to the left has a higher roof line, and it contains an arched cart entry with a Venetian window above, and a doorway converted into a window.	II
Underbank House; 53.73666°N 2.04271°W	—	c. 1820	A stone house on a plinth, with quoins, a band, an eaves cornice, and a stone slate roof. There are two storeys and a basement, a double-depth plan, a symmetrical front of three bays, and a two-bay return. Steps lead up to the central doorway that has pilasters with recessed panels and a triangular pediment. The windows have plain surrounds, the basement window has an inscribed lintel, there is a semicircular-arched stair window at the rear, and in the right return are stepped windows.	II
Shaw Bottom Farmhouse and barn 53.74929°N 2.05092°W	—	1823	A laithe house with two cottages, it is in stone and has a stone slate roof with coped gables and moulded kneelers. There are two storeys, and each cottage has one bay, a doorway, and mullioned windows. The barn to the right has an arched cart entry with a dated keystone, above which is a Venetian window, and to the right is a doorway. In the right gable end are rectangular vents and an owl hole.	II
1–7 High Street, Colden; 53.74942°N 2.05935°W	—	Early 19th century	A group of stone cottages with stone slate roofs. There are two storeys, and the cottages form an L-shaped plan. All the windows are mullioned, and a former taking-in door has been converted into a window.	II
2 and 3 Jack Bridge, Colden; 53.75037°N 2.05918°W		Early 19th century	A pair of stone cottages with quoins and a stone slate roof. There are two storeys, and each cottage has one bay, a doorway, and mullioned windows.	II
1 and 3 New Shaw Lane, Colden; 53.74905°N 2.06224°W	—	Early 19th century	A pair of cottages, later extended and combined into a single dwelling, it is in stone with quoins and a stone slate roof. There are two storeys and three bays, and the windows are mullioned. In the left bay is an inserted garage door, above which is a blocked taking-in door, and the doorway is in the middle bay.	II
Guide post 53.74475°N 2.06399°W		Early 19th century	The guide post is at a road junction, and consists of a stone with a pointed head. Pointed heads are inscribed on both sides, as are the distances, on one side to Hardcastle Craggs, Heptonstall, Burnley, and on the other side to Hebden Bridge, Halifax, and London.	II
Harleywood Gate Farmhouse and barn 53.74359°N 2.07320°W	—	Early 19th century (probable)	A laithe house in stone with quoins, a stone slate roof, two storeys and an attic. The north front of the barn has a semicircular-arched cart entry, with a Venetian window above, and square windows. The house is recessed on the left, and has two storeys and an attic, and a lean-to porch in the angle. At the rear is a similar arch and Venetian windows, and to the right are mullioned windows.	II
Lower Blackshaw Farmhouse; 53.74444°N 2.06260°W	—	Early 19th century	The farmhouse was originally three cottages that incorporated 17th-century material. It is in stone with a plinth at the rear, and a stone slate roof. There are two storeys and three bays. On the front is a later gabled porch that has a semicircular-arched doorway with a hood mould, and the windows are mullioned.	II
Moor Hall Farmhouse and barn 53.75062°N 2.08566°W	—	Early 19th century (probable)	A laithe house in stone with quoins, and a stone slate roof with coped gables. There are two storeys, and the house has two bays, a doorway and mullioned windows. The barn to the left has a semicircular-arched cart entry with a square pitching hole above.	II
New Delight Inn; 53.75011°N 2.05883°W		Early 19th century	The public house is in stone with quoins and a stone slate roof. There are two storeys and a double-pile plan. In the centre is a porch, the windows are mullioned, and the upper floor window has eight lights.	II
Shaw Bottom; 53.74937°N 2.05455°W	—	Early 19th century	A pair of stone cottages that were extended in about 1830. They have quoins, and a stone slate roof with a coped gable and kneelers. There are two storeys on the front and three at the rear. Each cottage has a doorway and mullioned windows. The extension to the right is slightly recessed and has a doorway with monolithic jambs and sash windows.	II
Blue Ball House and Blue Ball Cottage; 53.74450°N 2.06535°W		Early to mid 19th century	A public house, later two private houses, the building is in stone with quoins, a stone slate roof, and two storeys. Blue Bell House has three bays, a central doorway with monolithic jambs, two outer doorways, one blocked, and two-light mullioned windows. Blue Bell Cottage, to the right, is slightly smaller, with two bays, paired doorways, and stepped three-light mullioned windows.	II
Davey Hall; 53.74407°N 2.06659°W		Early to mid 19th century	A stone house with quoins, and a stone slate roof with coped gables and kneelers. There are two storeys, a double-pile plan, and a symmetrical front of three bays. In the centre is a doorway, and the windows on the front have plain surrounds. The right return contains four-light mullioned windows.	II
Davey Hall Cottage; 53.74405°N 2.06680°W	—	Early to mid 19th century	A row of four stone cottages with a stone slate roof. There are two storeys, each cottage has one bay, a doorway, and mullioned windows.	II
Milestone, Callis Mill; 53.73611°N 2.04087°W		Early to mid 19th century	The milestone is on the southeast side of the A646 road. It is an upright stone with two deeply chamfered faces. On the faces are inscribed the distances to Todmorden and to Halifax.	II
Top O'th'Hill; 53.75902°N 2.07558°W	—	Early to mid 19th century	A stone house with quoins and a stone slate roof. There are two storeys and an attic, a double-pile plan, and four bays. In the north facing gable end there are three doorways, with two doorways in the south gable end, and the windows are mullioned.	II
Boundary stone, Sand Bed Bridge; 53.73228°N 2.04706°W		Late 19th century	The stone marked the boundary between the Rural District and the Borough of Todmorden. It is built into the parapet of the bridge, and is divided into two sections, each inscribed with one of the two regions.	II
