= Hemsworth Rural District =

Former rural district in England

Coordinates: 53.614°N 1.354°W

Hemsworth
- Area
  - 1911: 34,750 acres (140.6 km^{2})
  - 1931: 30,587 acres (123.78 km^{2})
  - 1961: 29,019 acres (117.44 km^{2})
- Population
  - 1901: 23,379
  - 1931: 46,655
  - 1971: 40,103
- History
  - Origin: Hemsworth Rural Sanitary District
  - Created: 1894
  - Abolished: 1974
  - Succeeded by: Barnsley, Selby and Wakefield
- Status: Rural district
- Government: Hemsworth Rural District Council
  - HQ: Brierley Hall, Brierley
  - Motto: Constanter et recte (Steadfastly and justly)
- Subdivisions
  - Type: Civil parishes

Hemsworth was, from 1894 to 1974, a rural district in the West Riding of Yorkshire, England.

== Creation ==
The district was formed by the Local Government Act 1894 as successor to the Hemsworth Rural Sanitary District. A directly elected rural district council (RDC) replaced the previous rural sanitary authority, which had consisted of the poor law guardians for the area.

== Boundary changes ==
The district underwent two major boundary changes over its existence. Firstly, in 1921 Hemsworth became a separate urban district. Secondly, the Local Government Act 1929 obliged county councils to conduct a review of all districts within their jurisdiction. West Riding County Council made an order in 1938 that saw it exchange territory with neighbouring rural districts.

== Civil parishes ==
The rural district consisted of a number of civil parishes:

- Ackworth
- Badsworth
- Billingley (transferred in 1938 from abolished Barnsley Rural District)
- Brierley
- Great Houghton
- Hamphall Stubbs (parish abolished in 1938, and area transferred to Hampole parish in Doncaster Rural District)
- Havercroft with Cold Hiendley
- Hemsworth (constituted a separate urban district in 1921)
- Hessle and Hill Top
- Huntwick with Foulby and Nostell
- Kirk Smeaton
- Little Houghton
- Little Smeaton
- North Elmsall
- Ryhill
- Shafton
- Skelbrooke (parish abolished in 1938, and area transferred to Hampole parish in Doncaster Rural District)
- South Elmsall
- South Hiendley
- South Kirkby
- Thorpe Audlin
- Upton
- Walden Stubbs
- West Hardwick
- Wintersett (transferred to Wakefield Rural District in 1938).

== Coat of arms ==
Hemsworth Rural District Council was granted armorial bearings by the College of Arms by letters patent dated 12 October 1954. They were blazoned as follows:

Sable on a Mount in base an Oak Tree proper fructed Or on a Chief Gules a Cross couped Gold between two Roses Argent barbed and seeded also proper; and for a Crest: Out of a Circlet Azure charged with a Crescent Argent between two Mullets of six points Or a Bull's Head Sable armed Gold.

The shield had a black field for the local coal-mining industry. Upon this was placed an oak tree on a grassy mount for the rural areas of the district. In particular it represented the "Old Adam" oak on Brierley Common. The chief or upper third of the shield was red, and bore a gold cross between two white roses. The roses were the symbols of Yorkshire, while the cross represented the ancient wapentake of Osgoldcross. A gold cross also featured in the arms of Nostell Priory.

The crest on top of a helm and mantling was a black bull's head from the arms of Robert Holgate, Archbishop of York, who endowed a hospital in Hemsworth. The bull's head rose from a blue circlet a silver crescent between two gold stars. These represented Ackworth School, and came from the arms of the Governors of the Foundling Hospital who had owned the building before it becoming a school.

The Latin motto adopted by the council was Constanter et Recte or "Steadfastly and Justly". This was adapted from that of the Warde-Aldam family.

== Abolition ==
The district was abolished in 1974 by the Local Government Act 1972, which reorganised council areas throughout England and Wales.

The area it administered was split three ways:

- Billingley, Brierley, Great Houghton, Little Houghton, and Shafton going to the Metropolitan Borough of Barnsley in South Yorkshire;
- Kirk Smeaton, Little Smeaton and Walden Stubbs going to the district of Selby in North Yorkshire,
- Ackworth, Badsworth, Havercroft with Cold Hiendley, Hessle and Hill Top, Huntwick with Foulby and Nostell, North Elmsall, Ryhill, South Elmsall, South Hiendley, South Kirkby, Thorpe Audlin, Upton and West Hardwick passed to the Metropolitan Borough of Wakefield in West Yorkshire.
