= Listed buildings in Ryhill =

Ryhill is a civil parish in the metropolitan borough of the City of Wakefield, West Yorkshire, England. The parish contains two listed buildings that are recorded in the National Heritage List for England. Both the listed buildings are designated at Grade II, the lowest of the three grades, which is applied to "buildings of national importance and special interest". The parish contains the village of Ryhill and the surrounding area, and the listed buildings consist of a well head and a farmhouse.

== Buildings ==
Name and location	Photograph	Date	Notes
Well head 53.62654°N 1.41811°W	—	Medieval (probable)	The well head is in sandstone with a steeply pitched sandstone roof, and consists of a single cell. In the north wall is a square-headed doorway with a chamfered surround, above it is a round-headed niche, on the gable apex is a pedestal for a finial or cross, and on the sides are ledges. Two steps lead down to a stone cistern of water, and the roof has a barrel vault.
Rycliff Farmhouse and wall 53.62442°N 1.42041°W	—	Mid or late 17th century	The farmhouse is in sandstone, and has a stone slate roof with coped gables and kneelers. There are three storeys, two bays, and a two-storey rear wing. The central doorway has a fanlight, and the windows are sashes. At the front of the house, enclosing the garden, is a wall with ridged coping.
