= Listed buildings in Parlington =

Parlington is a civil parish in the metropolitan borough of the City of Leeds, West Yorkshire, England. The parish contains 18 listed buildings that are recorded in the National Heritage List for England. Of these, two are listed at Grade II*, the middle of the three grades, and the others are at Grade II, the lowest grade. The parish was centred on the country house of Parlington Hall, but this was largely demolished in 1952. Most of the listed buildings are in the remaining estate, and include a triumphal arch, a bridge, a tunnel, the home farm, a garden house and associated garden walls, an icehouse, a group of stallion pens, a deer shelter, and lodges at the entrances to the grounds. The other listed buildings are a group of almshouses and associated structures, a farmhouse, and a milepost.

== Key ==
Grade	Criteria
II*	Particularly important buildings of more than special interest
II	Buildings of national importance and special interest

== Buildings ==
Name and location	Photograph	Date	Notes	Grade
Icehouse; 53.82044°N 1.35735°W	—	Late 18th century (probable)	The icehouse in the grounds of the Parlington Estate is mostly in brick. It is mainly below ground and set into an earth mound, and has a circular plan and a domed top. The opening is angled and in stone, and is flanked by limestone and brick walls.	II
Park House Farmhouse, walls and pavilions 53.81090°N 1.35721°W		Late 18th century	The farmhouse is in magnesian limestone with sill bands, and stone slate roofs. There is a U-shaped plan, consisting of a central range with two storeys and a parapet with a blind balustrade, and flanking three-storey wings with hipped roofs. The windows are sashes, some horizontally sliding. Attached to the house and linking to pavilions on each side are screen walls with a doorway. In the pavilions are blocked doorways in recessed round arches with Gibbs surrounds, and beyond are quadrant walls. At the rear of the house is a large canted bay window.	II
The Cottage; 53.82506°N 1.34738°W		Late 18th century (probable)	A former lodge to the Parlington Estate, it is in sandstone, partly stuccoed, with a pantile roof. There are two storeys, two bays, and a single-storey brick service wing on the left. The front facing the lane has a pedimented gable containing a blind oval. In the centre is a doorway with a fanlight and a moulded cornice in a recessed round-headed arch, and the windows are sashes. On each side is a screen wall containing a doorway.	II
The Light Arch; 53.82083°N 1.35501°W		Late 18th century	A bridge carrying the south drive of the Parlington Estate over Parlington Lane. It is in limestone, and consists of a single segmental arch with voussoirs, springing from quoined jambs and impost bands. At the top of the arch are flat copings, and extending from both sides are walls lining the cutting.	II
Hookmoor Lodges; 53.81504°N 1.34416°W	—	c. 1780	A pair of lodges at the southeast entrance to the Parlington Estate, they are in limestone with some stucco, and with slate roofs. Each lodge has two low storeys, and a pedimented modillioned gable containing a lunette facing the road. Under the pediment is a recessed arch with a Gibbs surround containing a sash window. The front facing the drive contains a doorway with a Gibbs surround, and the north lodge has a two-storey extension. Flanking the entrance are gate piers with a quatrefoil section, about 2 metres (6 ft 7 in) high, each with a moulded cornice, and the left pier with a ball finial. The piers are linked to the lodges by short quadrant walls.	II
Triumphal Arch; 53.82355°N 1.36078°W		1781–83	The arch in the Parlington Estate was designed by Thomas Leverton for Sir Thomas Gascoigne. It is in limestone and consists of three bays, each containing a round-headed arch, the middle arch larger, and the outer arches with keystones and blind ovals above. The arch has giant pilasters, and an entablature with a moulded cornice, a frieze containing an inscription supporting American Independence, and a parapet.	II*
The Gardens House and garden walls 53.82048°N 1.36088°W	—	Late 18th or early 19th century	The house is in red brick with stone dressings, a modillioned cornice, and a pyramidal stone slate roof. There are two storeys and sides of three bays. The front facing the garden has an arcade of three recessed arches containing a French window and sash windows. Attached to the house are hot walls with the remains of flues and furnaces. To the southeast are the walls of a former rectangular walled garden, and to the northwest a high bow-shaped wall encloses a former semicircular garden.	II
Shelter; 53.82468°N 1.35432°W		1802	The deer shelter in the grounds of the Parlington Estate is in sandstone. It consists of a circular structure without a roof, and contains arched doorways and blind doorways.	II
The Dark Arch; 53.81830°N 1.35853°W		1813	A limestone tunnel taking Parlington Lane out of sight of the house. It is about 75 metres (246 ft) long and slightly curved. At each end is a portal consisting of a semicircular arch with voussoirs, springing from quoined jambs. The tunnel contains four air grates, and extending from both ends are walls lining the cutting.	II
Parlington Home Farm; 53.82144°N 1.36581°W	—	1813–15	The buildings of the home farm to the Parlington Estate are in red brick with dressings in limestone and roofs of slate with some tiles. They form a quadrangular courtyard plan and the farmhouse is on the southeast side. This has two storeys and three bays with pedimented gables and paired modillions, each gable containing an oculus. Most windows are casements, and some sashes remain. The doorways have fanlights and flat hoods. The northwest range of farm buildings has two storeys and eleven bays, and contains a three-bay threshing barn, and a five-bay cross-wing, and the other ranges each has a single storey.	II
Stallion pens, Parlington Home Farm; 53.82511°N 1.36523°W	—	1813	The four stallion pens are to the northeast of the farm, and are enclosed by limestone walls about 8 feet (2.4 m) high with rounded corners. There are two wide entrances and narrower pedestrian entrances that have cylindrical limestone piers with domed caps. Also, between the pens are gateways with piers, and some entrances have been infilled with large sandstone blocks.	II
Barwick Lodge, gate piers and walls 53.83135°N 1.37070°W		Early 19th century	The lodge at the northern entrance to the Parlington Estate is in limestone, partly rendered, on a plinth, with deep overhanging eaves, and a slate roof, hipped at the angles. There is one storey, a hexagonal plan, a front of three bays, and a flat-roofed projection to the north. In the centre is a doorway, most of the windows are sashes, and some are blind. At the entrance to the drive are gate piers with shallow domed caps, and attached curving walls with rounded copings.	II
Wakefield Lodge, gate piers and wall 53.81222°N 1.35086°W	—	Early 19th century	The lodge at the southern entrance to the Parlington Estate, which was later extended, is rendered, on a plinth, with quoins, modillions, and a slate roof, hipped at the angles. The extension is in brick. The lodge has a single storey, a hexagonal plan, and a front of three bays, and the windows are sashes. At the entrance to the drive are square limestone gate piers with pyramidal caps, and curving walls with rounded copings.	II
Gascoigne Almshouses and cottage 53.82181°N 1.34461°W		1843–45	The almshouses, later used for other purposes, were designed by George Fowler Jones in Gothic style, and are in limestone with slate roofs. They consist of a central entrance tower, flanked on each side by four single-bay gabled two-storey lodgings, at the ends are projecting gabled wings containing a chapel and a refectory, and at the rear is a cloister-corridor. The building has buttresses, octagonal turrets, and pinnacles with crosses. The tower has a doorway with a four-centred arch above which is a lettered panel and a hood mould, and a band of quatrefoils. Over this is a two light window with Perpendicular tracery flanked by niches, a clock face, and an embattled parapet with corner and centre pinnacles. At the north end is a warden's cottage with two storeys and a pyramidal roof.	II*
Lodge, Gascoigne Almshouses; 53.82130°N 1.34390°W		c. 1844	The lodge at the entrance to the drive is in limestone, and has a slate roof with gable parapets, gableted kneelers, fleur-de-lys apex finials, and a cockscomb ridge. There is one storey, two bays, and a single-storey flat-roofed extension to the right. Facing the drive is a gabled porch that has outer and inner doorways with four-centred arches, and to the right is a canted bay window containing mullioned and transomed windows, with a hipped roof and a gablet containing a shield.	II
Pump at rear of Gascoigne Almshouses; 53.82181°N 1.34486°W	—	c. 1844	The pump at the rear of the building is in limestone with mechanism in iron. It has a square section, and there is a pedestal with a chamfered plinth, and a louvred top with a pyramidal cap. On the north side is an S-shaped handle, facing the building is a spout in the form of a grotesque with an open mouth, and projecting from the plinth is a semi-octagonal bowl.	II
Front wall and gate piers, Gascoigne Almshouses; 53.82171°N 1.34361°W		c. 1844 (probable)	The wall stretching along the front of the grounds is in magnesian limestone, and about 130 metres (430 ft) long. At intervals there are projecting piers, and at each end is a pair of gate piers with pyramidal caps and ogee finials.	II
Milepost at SE432355; 53.81356°N 1.34423°W	—	Mid 19th century (probable)	The mile post is on the southeast side of Aberford Road (B1217 road). It is in stone with a triangular section and a rounded top, and has an overlay in cast iron. Inscribed on the top is "WAKEFIELD & ABERFORD ROAD" and "PARLINGTON", and on the sides are the distances to Aberford, Wakefield, and Oulton.	II
