= Listed buildings in Erringden =

Erringden is a civil parish in the metropolitan borough of Calderdale, West Yorkshire, England. It contains 30 listed buildings that are recorded in the National Heritage List for England. All the listed buildings are designated at Grade II, the lowest of the three grades, which is applied to "buildings of national importance and special interest". The parish is entirely rural and consists mainly of moorland with isolated buildings, and most of the listed buildings are houses, farmhouses, and farm buildings. The Rochdale Canal runs through the northwest part of the parish, and the listed buildings associated with this are two bridges and two locks, and the parish also contains a former packhorse bridge.

== Buildings ==
Name and location	Photograph	Date	Notes
10 Horsehold and barn 53.73670°N 2.02724°W	—	Late 16th century	The house was altered in the 19th century, and the barn was added in 1837; the buildings are in stone with stone slate roofs. The house has two storeys, a hall and cross-wing, a rear outshut, and a two-storey porch with a catslide roof. In the right return is a doorway with a chamfered surround, and most of the windows have mullions. Above the ground floor windows is a continuous moulded hood mould. The barn has quoins, a coped gable with kneelers, and it contains an arched cart entry over which is a Venetian window with a dated lintel.
Height Farmhouse; 53.72293°N 2.04774°W		Late 16th century	A dairy was added to the farmhouse in the 17th century. The house is in stone, and it has a stone slate roof with coped gables and kneelers. There are two storeys, a three-bay hall range, a cross-wing, and a rear dairy. The doorway has a chamfered surround, and the windows have mullions, most of them chamfered. Above the ground floor windows is a continuous hood mould.
Cruttonstall; 53.73161°N 2.03803°W	—	Early 17th century	The house is in stone with stone slate roofs, and is partly ruinous. There are two storeys, a three-bay hall range, and a cross-wing. The windows are mullioned, some with hood moulds, and there are two doorways, one with monolithic jambs, and the other with composite jambs, a wide lintel, and a moulded surround.
Edge End Farmhouse; 53.73029°N 2.03327°W		Early 17th century	The farmhouse, which was altered and extended in the 18th century, is in stone on a plinth, with quoins, a moulded string course, and a stone slate roof with coped gables and kneelers. There are two storeys and an L-shaped plan, and the windows have chamfered mullions.
Great Jumps; 53.73134°N 2.01095°W	—	Mid 17th century	A stone house with a tile roof, there are two storeys, three bays, and a single-storey rear outshut. The windows have chamfered mullions.
Higham; 53.72403°N 2.04269°W	—	Mid 17th century	The house, which was altered in the 18th century, is in stone and has a stone slate roof with coped gables and kneelers. There are two storeys and two bays. On the front and at the rear are doorways with chamfered surrounds, and the windows are mullioned.
Old Chamber; 53.73416°N 2.01309°W		Mid 17th century	A house with an added barn and later altered, it is in stone with a stone slate roof. There are two storeys, three bays, and a single-storey rear outshut. The windows are mullioned, and the building contains a cart entry with composite jambs, a chamfered surround, and a heavy lintel, and another cart entry with a segmental arch.
Cottage and barn southeast of Old Chamber; 53.73353°N 2.01074°W		Mid 17th century	The barn was added to the cottage in the 19th century. The building is in stone with a stone slate roof and two storeys. It contains a doorway with a composite jambs and a chamfered surround, mullioned windows, and a cart entry with an elliptical arch and a chamfered surround.
Kershaw Farmhouse and barn 53.72226°N 2.02718°W		Late 17th century	The barn was added to the farmhouse when it was extended in about 1800; both are in stone with stone slate roofs. The house has coped gables, two storeys and three bays. The doorway has composite jambs and a chamfered surround, and the windows are mullioned. The barn has an outshut with quoins, and a wide cart entry with a straight lintel.
Pinnacle; 53.73121°N 2.02534°W		Late 17th century	A house with an attached barn, it is in stone and has a stone slate roof with coped gables and kneelers. There are two storeys, two bays, and with the barn it forms an L-shaped plan. The doorway is arched and has a chamfered surround on the left, and the windows are mullioned. The barn on the left has a single aisle and quoins, and contains a cart entry and a doorway, both with segmental arches.
Oaks Farmhouse; 53.72981°N 2.04414°W	—	1701	The farmhouse is in stone with quoins, and a stone slate roof with kneelers on the north gable. There are two storeys, three bays, and a rear outshut. The doorway has composite jambs, a chamfered surround, and a decorated lintel with engraved initials and the date. Most of the windows are mullioned, and there is a single sash window.
Height Gate Farmhouse and barn 53.72272°N 2.04380°W		Early 18th century	The barn was added in the 19th century, and the buildings are in stone with stone slate roofs. The house has quoins, two storeys, and three bays. On the front is a doorway with monolithic jambs, and a lean-to porch, and the windows are mullioned. The barn is at right angles, it contains an arched cart entry with rusticated voussoirs, and above it is a Venetian window with a projecting false keystone.
Barn west of Higham; 53.72391°N 2.04295°W	—	Early 18th century	A stone barn with a stone slate roof, it contains a segmental-arched cart entry with an inner doorway within a portal. To the left is a mullioned window, and to the right is a doorway with a chamfered surround and a quoined lintel.
Thorps; 53.72736°N 2.04225°W	—	Early 18th century	A barn was added to the house in the 19th century; the building is in stone and has stone slate roofs with coped gables. The house has one storey and an attic, two bays, and an outshut forming a porch. The windows are mullioned. The barn has an outshut forming an aisle, and it contains a square-headed cart entry, a doorway and rectangular vents.
Bridge over stream 53.73135°N 2.03161°W		18th century (probable)	A former packhorse bridge over a stream, it is in stone and consists of a single arch. The arch is formed by rough dressed voussoirs, and there is no parapet.
Bridge No. 21, Callis Bridge; 53.73416°N 2.04451°W		Late 18th century	The bridge carries the Pennine Way over the Rochdale Canal. It is in stone, and consists of a single horseshoe elliptical arch. The bridge has rusticated voussoirs, a band, a parapet, buttressed corners, and large flagstone cappings.
Bridge No. 22, Burnt Acres Lane Bridge; 53.73032°N 2.04963°W		Late 18th century	The bridge carries Burnt Acres Lane over the Rochdale Canal. It is in stone, and consists of a single horseshoe elliptical arch. The bridge has rusticated voussoirs, a band, a parapet, buttressed corners, and large flagstone cappings.
Lock No. 12, Rawden Mill Lock; 53.73522°N 2.04118°W		1798	The lock on the Rochdale Canal has large dressed stone retaining walls with rebates for gates. It is fitted with the facility for a double set of bottom gates.
Lock No. 13, Callis Lock; 53.73320°N 2.04418°W		1798	The lock on the Rochdale Canal has large dressed stone retaining walls with massive stone copings and rebates for gates. It is fitted with the facility for a double set of bottom gates. Steps lead down at the northern end.
5 and 7 Horsehold; 53.73632°N 2.02795°W		Early 19th century	A laithe-house in stone, that has a stone slate roof with coped gables, and consists of two cottages and a barn. The cottages are back to back with two storeys and one bay, and the windows are mullioned. The barn contains a segmental-arched cart entry, rectangular vents, mullioned windows, a doorway with monolithic jambs, and a Venetian window with an impost and a false keystone.
Erringden Grange Farmhouse and attached barn 53.73081°N 2.02137°W	—	Early 19th century	The house and barn are in stone with stone slate roofs. The house has quoins, a moulded cornice, and coped gables with |moulded kneelers. There are two storeys and a symmetrical front of three bays. The central doorway has monolithic jambs and a fanlight, the windows have modern glazing, and there is a semicircular-arched stair window at the rear. The barn contains a semicircular-arched cart entry, mullioned windows, doorways with monolithic jambs, arrow slit vents, and square pitching holes.
Cottage, Cattle Shade and Cowhouse west of Erringden Grange; 53.73089°N 2.02183°W		Early 19th century	The cottage is in stone with quoins and a stone slate roof. It has two storeys and one bay, and contains mullioned windows. Attached to the left is a slightly curving single-storey range with an arcade of seven arches with monolithic pillars; two of the arches are open. Further to the left is a cowhouse with two doorways and mullioned windows.
Cottage and outbuilding north of Erringden Grange Farmhouse and cart shed 53.73104°N 2.02122°W	—	Early 19th century	The buildings are in stone with quoins and a stone slate roof. There are three storeys, and they contain doorways with monolithic jambs, taking-in doors, one approached by external steps, mullioned windows, and semicircular-headed cart entries.
1 and 3 Horsehold; 53.73632°N 2.02824°W	—	c. 1830	A pair of stone cottages with quoins, and a stone slate roof with coped gables and kneelers. There are two storeys and two bays. No. 1 has a flat-roofed porch, the windows on the front are mullioned, and at the rear are square windows.
Barn southwest of Oaks Farmhouse; 53.72972°N 2.04432°W	—	Early to mid 19th century	The barn is in stone with quoins, and a stone slate roof with kneelers. On the front is a segmental-arched cart entry, above which is a Venetian window with imposts and a false keystone, and to the left is a doorway with a quoined lintel and a chamfered surround. In the left return is a doorway with a segmental-arched lintel and a chamfered surround, and above are rectangular vents. Attached to the rear is a possible former cottage with a four-light chamfered mullioned window.
Bents; 53.73515°N 2.02360°W	—	1839	A laithe-house in stone that has a stone slate roof with coped gables. The cottage has two storeys, a double-pile plan and one bay, and on the front is a lean-to porch and mullioned windows. The barn has a doorway, and an arched cart entry with rusticated voussoirs, above which is a Venetian window with an impost, a keystone, and an inscribed lintel.
2 and 4 Horsehold; 53.73660°N 2.02761°W	—	c. 1840	A pair of stone cottages with quoins, and a stone slate roof with coped gables and moulded kneelers. There are two storeys and each cottage has two bays and a doorway. The windows are mullioned.
Weasel Hall and Weasel Hall Cottage; 53.73906°N 2.01840°W	—	c. 1840	The house, which has been divided, is in stone with a moulded eaves band and gutter brackets, and a hipped stone slate roof. There are two storeys and three bays, and the windows are mullioned.
Barn southeast of 10 Horsehold; 53.73662°N 2.02703°W	—	1841	The barn is in stone with quoins, and a stone slate roof with coped gables and kneelers. On the front is an arched cart entry with a keystone above which is a Venetian window with an inscribed lintel, and the entry is flanked by doorways. In the gable ends are rectangular vents and circular holes in the apices. At the rear is a cart entry with a square lintel, flanked by doorways with quoined lintels and chamfered surrounds.
11 and 13 Horsehold; 53.73650°N 2.02719°W	—	Undated	A pair of cottages later used for agricultural purposes, they are in stone with quoins, and have coped gables and kneelers. There are two storeys and an east front of six bays. The windows have plain surrounds, and at the rear are three doorways and windows.
