= Chiserley =

Hamlet in West Yorkshire, England

Coordinates: 53.752866°N 1.993897°W

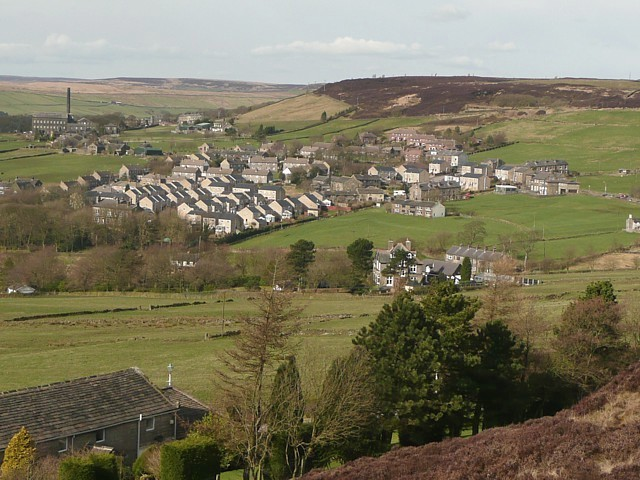
- View of Chiserley, 2009

- Location within West Yorkshire
- OS grid reference: SE005285
- Civil parish: Wadsworth
- Metropolitan borough: Calderdale
- Metropolitan county: West Yorkshire
- Region: Yorkshire and the Humber
- Country: England
- Sovereign state: United Kingdom
- Post town: HALIFAX
- Postcode district: HX7
- Police: West Yorkshire
- Fire: West Yorkshire
- Ambulance: Yorkshire

Chiserley is a hamlet located on a hilltop near the town of Hebden Bridge, in the county of West Yorkshire, England. The Hamlet falls within the Calder ward of Calderdale.

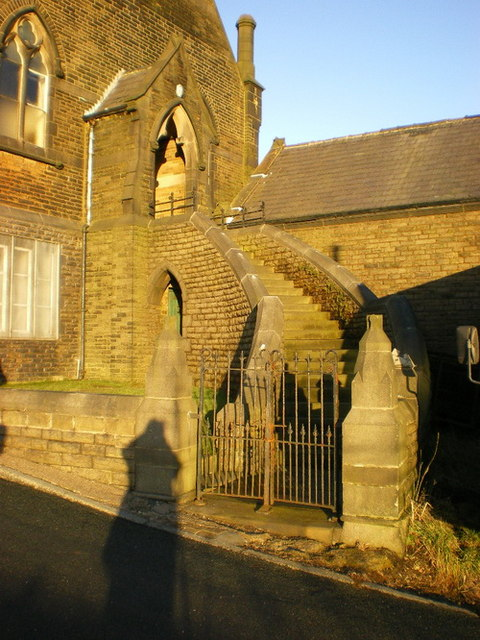
Old Town Methodist Church, Chiserley, 2008

== History ==
It was called Chisley until 1964, but was changed to Chiserley on the 1979 OS map. Once it was a hamlet of farms, mills and terrace houses for mill-workers but now it is a village.
