= Wadsworth, West Yorkshire =

Civil parish in West Yorkshire, England

Coordinates: 53°45′N 02°00′W

Wadsworth parish within Calderdale

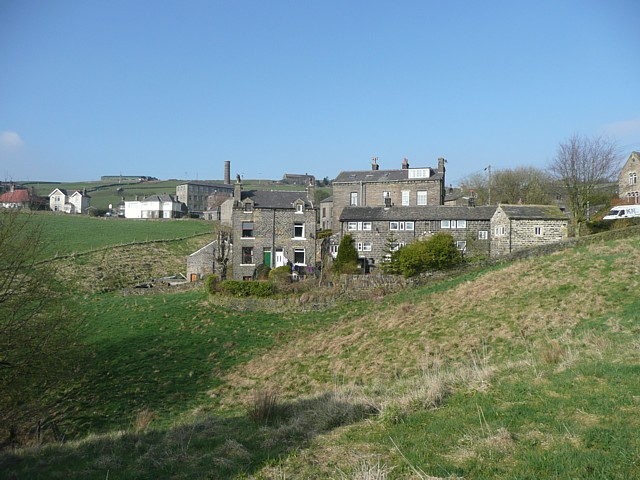
Houses in Wadsworth

Wadsworth is a civil parish in the Metropolitan Borough of Calderdale in West Yorkshire, England. It has a population of 1,456, increasing to 1,603 at the 2011 Census, and was, until 1974, part of Hepton Rural District. With an area of 4,744 hectares (11,720 acres), the parish is the second largest by area in England.

== History ==
Historically part of the West Riding of Yorkshire, the main settlements in the parish are Old Town, Chiserley and Pecket Well. It was named as being in the wapentake of Morley in the Domesday Book of 1086, and thus subsequently recorded as a subinfeudatory manor, before its subsequent extinguishment in the nineteenth century. From the seventeenth century it was also one of five townships forming the chapelry of Heptonstall. (Note: The other four locations were Erringden, Langfield, Stansfield, and Heptonstall itself.)

The parish is the second largest in England by area and it covers approximately 4,744 hectares (11,720 acres), and on the moorland of the upper parish are the three Walshaw Dean Reservoirs and also the parish boundary goes through the middle of Widdop Reservoir. The high moorland is the site of a proposed onshore windfarm, the largest in England, though it was scaled back from 65 turbines to 34, which will make it the joint largest if given planning permission. Wadsworth derives from a personal name (Waeddi) and worð meaning worth, an Old English word for enclosure, although there is no settlement called Wadsworth. The township of Wadsworth is listed as being 8 miles (13 km) west of Halifax and 12 miles (19 km) east of Rochdale.

Within the parish is Crimsworth Dean Beck, which has Lumb Waterfall upon it. The site of the waterfall is where Ted Hughes composed Six Young Men. The name Crimsworth is also said to have inspired one of the characters in Charlotte Brontë's novel The Professor.
