= Hessle and Hill Top =

Civil parish in West Yorkshire, England

Coordinates: 53.653°N 1.348°W

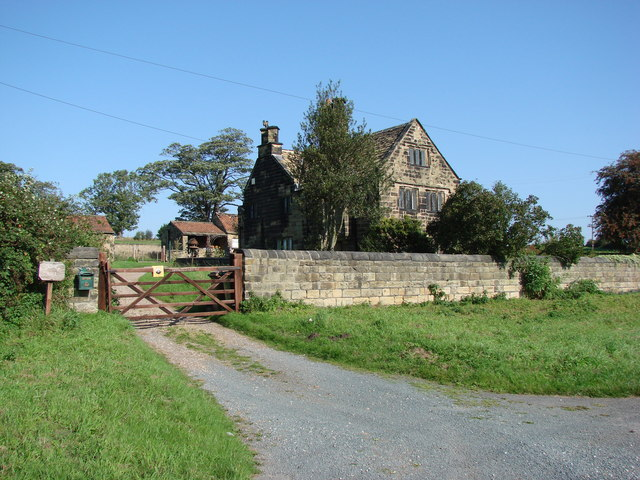
- Hessle Hall

- Location within West Yorkshire
- Population: 138 (including West Hardwick, 2011)
- OS grid reference: SE248677
- Civil parish: Hessle and Hill Top
- Metropolitan borough: City of Wakefield
- Metropolitan county: West Yorkshire
- Region: Yorkshire and the Humber
- Country: England
- Sovereign state: United Kingdom
- Post town: WAKEFIELD
- Postcode district: WF4
- Dialling code: 01977
- Police: West Yorkshire
- Fire: West Yorkshire
- Ambulance: Yorkshire
- UK Parliament: Hemsworth

Hessle and Hill Top is a civil parish in the City of Wakefield district of West Yorkshire, England. Scattered settlements in the rural parish include Wragby village and the hamlet of Hessle, which is about 1 mile (1.6 km) northwest of the village of Ackworth Moor Top and 3 1/2 miles (6 km) southwest of Pontefract. At the 2011 census the parish was grouped with the neighbouring parish of West Hardwick, and a combined population of 138 was recorded.

== Governance ==
Until 1974, Hessle and Hill Top was part of Hemsworth Rural District. The parish is in the Hemsworth UK parliament constituency.

== Parish ==
The earliest recorded date for the parish is 1066, referred to as Hessle, derived from hæesle meaning hazel tree, under the administrative unit of Odgodcross and attributed to a Lord Alward in 1066 and then to Lord Mauger of Elington 20 years later.

In the 1870s, Hessle, previously known as Hasel, was described as

"a township in Wragby parish...4 miles E of Wakefield"

Hessle and Hill Top is a small parish largely consisting of green space and countryside, with the woodland and agricultural farm land making up roughly 95% of the total land use, however only 6.1% of the parish use these spaces.

Within the parish are 66 dwellings. Five of them, dating from between 1641 and 1810 are Grade II listed. Most houses in the parish are three-bedroom detached or semi-detached properties.

There are no local shops within the parish, but there are other neighbouring settlements that provide services, the closest being Ackworth. Two scenic walks go through Hessle and Hill Top and the neighbouring parish of Ackworth, visiting most landmarks and places of interest.

The nearest railway stations are at Pontefract, Featherstone and Fitzwilliam.

== Population ==
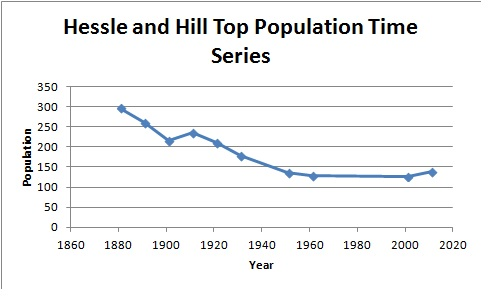
Population change of Hessle and Hill Top from 1881 to 2011

The population of Hessle and Hill Top has shown a decrease since 1881 from a total population of 296 to its current population of 138, according to the 2011 census, as part of a steady trend since the beginning of the 20th century. People aged 40 years old and over make up 73% of the population of the parish. Other indicators of an ageing population include the mean age being 45.6 years, 6 years older than the national average. The parish has an almost entirely white population, with only one person being of mixed race and the other 137 of white British descent.

== See also ==
- Listed buildings in Hessle and Hill Top
