= Lotherton cum Aberford =

Civil parish in West Yorkshire, England

Coordinates: 53°49′13.9″N 1°19′35.8″W

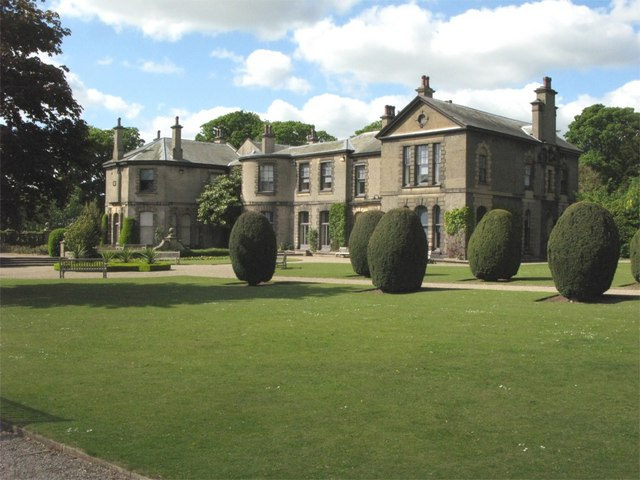
Lotherton Hall

Lotherton cum Aberford is a civil parish in the metropolitan borough of Leeds in West Yorkshire, England. The population of the civil parish (including Parlington) at the 2011 Census was 323. Until 1974 it was in the Tadcaster Rural District in the West Riding of Yorkshire.

The parish contains the southeastern fringes of the village of Aberford, and Lotherton Hall.

== See also ==
- Civil parishes in West Yorkshire
- Listed buildings in Aberford and Lotherton
