= Old Town, West Yorkshire =

Coordinates: 53.752192°N 2.004482°W

Old Town
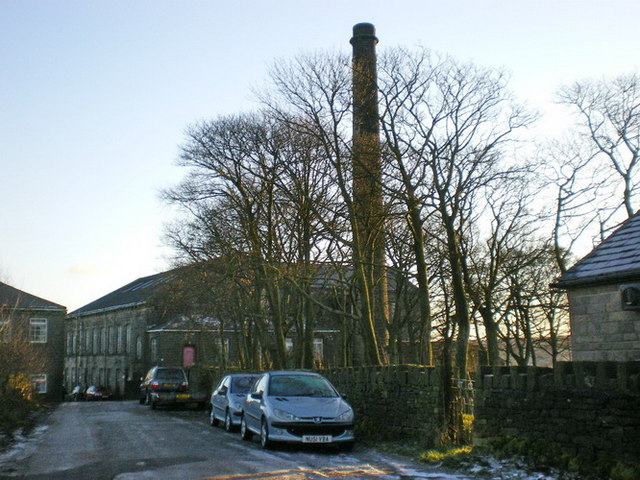
- Mill Lane

- Location within West Yorkshire
- OS grid reference: SD998284
- Civil parish: Wadsworth
- Metropolitan borough: Calderdale
- Metropolitan county: West Yorkshire
- Region: Yorkshire and the Humber
- Country: England
- Sovereign state: United Kingdom
- Post town: HEBDEN BRIDGE
- Postcode district: HX7
- Dialling code: 01422
- Police: West Yorkshire
- Fire: West Yorkshire
- Ambulance: Yorkshire
- UK Parliament: Calder Valley

Old Town is a village in Calderdale, West Yorkshire, England. It is situated on a hilltop above Hebden Bridge and across the Hebden valley from Heptonstall. Both Old Town and nearby Pecket Well are served by Wadsworth Parish Council. Old Town has a village green, two chapels, a pub called the Hare & Hounds (known by the locals as Lane Ends) and a post office which has a café situated within. The village has a population of about 1,070.

== Famous people ==
- Stuart Fielden, Great Britain rugby league player
