= Blackshaw =

Civil parish in West Yorkshire, England

Coordinates: 53.746°N 2.081°W

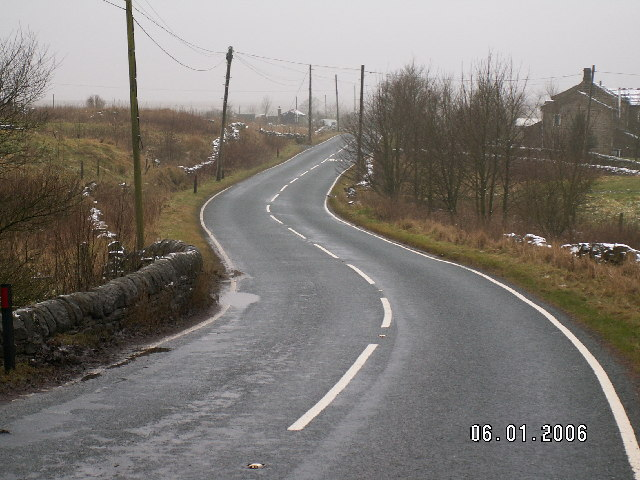
- The Long Causeway traversing the parish area

- Blackshaw parish highlighted within Calderdale
- Population: 952 (2011)
- OS grid reference: SD9527
- Civil parish: Blackshaw
- Metropolitan borough: Calderdale
- Metropolitan county: West Yorkshire
- Region: Yorkshire and the Humber
- Country: England
- Sovereign state: United Kingdom
- Post town: HALIFAX
- Postcode district: HX7
- Dialling code: 01422
- Police: West Yorkshire
- Fire: West Yorkshire
- Ambulance: Yorkshire
- UK Parliament: Calder Valley

Blackshaw is a civil parish in the Calderdale metropolitan borough of West Yorkshire, England. It contains the village of Blackshaw Head. According to the 2001 census, the parish had a population of 935, increasing to 992 at the 2011 Census.

== Governance ==
Blackshaw is a civil parish and part of the Calder ward of Calderdale, a metropolitan borough within the ceremonial county of West Yorkshire in England.

== See also ==
- Listed buildings in Blackshaw
