= Ryhill =

Village and civil parish in West Yorkshire, England

Coordinates: 53.616764°N 1.402057°W

- Location within West Yorkshire
- Population: 2,894 (2011)
- OS grid reference: SE395135
- Civil parish: Ryhill
- Metropolitan borough: City of Wakefield
- Metropolitan county: West Yorkshire
- Region: Yorkshire and the Humber
- Country: England
- Sovereign state: United Kingdom
- Post town: Wakefield
- Postcode district: WF4
- Dialling code: 01226
- Police: West Yorkshire
- Fire: West Yorkshire
- Ambulance: Yorkshire

Ryhill is a small village and civil parish situated on the B6428 road in West Yorkshire, England approximately 6 miles (10 km) north-east of Barnsley. It has a population of 2,628, increasing to 2,894 at the 2011 census.

Historically Ryhill is part of the West Riding of Yorkshire in the Wapentake of Staincross. The Wapentake almost corresponds with the current Barnsley Metropolitan Area, although a few settlements and townships within the Staincross Wapentake such as Ryhill were put outside the Metropolitan Borough of Barnsley and now lie within the current West Yorkshire Metropolitan Area since April 1974.

Like many of the surrounding villages, it is still recovering from the effects of pit closures which has seen the demise of the many collieries which once surrounded the village. The local economy is currently enjoying a return to prosperity as new housing developments have made the village popular with commuters to nearby towns.

The first mention of Ryhill in recorded history is an entry in the 1086 Domesday Book which describes 'Rihella' as having 4 ploughlands and an area of pasturable woodland.

The name "Ryhill" itself is almost self-explanatory: it simply means "hill where rye is grown". Originating in Old English, the name is formed of the elements ryge and hyll.

An alternative interpretation is for 'Ra', which refers to Roe Deer. Both of the interpretations seem feasible; the village itself has a long-standing history in farming, but the naming of surrounding connected areas poses an interesting possibility for Roe Deer, Wintersett immediately below Ryhill being a place to take livestock during the winter months, Nostell being a Roman stable, Newstead being grazing land, Cold Hiendley and South Hiendley also suggestive of clearings for livestock, possibly with connections to the larger settlement at Ringstone Hill, Brierley.

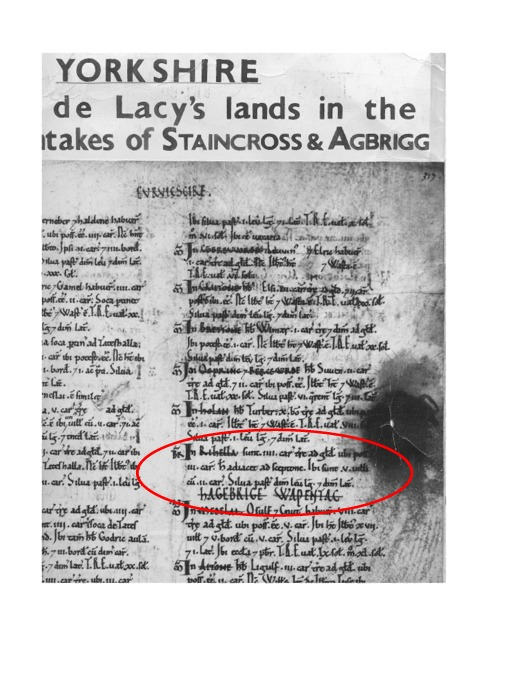
Ryhill's entry in the Domesday Book

== Mining ==
There are historical accounts recorded of mining by monks at Nostell Priory just down the road from Ryhill going back 900 years and more, the area still shows several former bell pit sites on the road from Station Road, Ryhill through to Nostell. It is fair to surmise that mining for local use has also been active in Ryhill since settlement.

Ryhill Main Colliery was situated on West Fields, Ryhill and had a tramway that connected up to the Barnsley Canal, Old Royston junction of the Midland Railway and the Barnsley Coal Railway which ran through Ryhill. There was also a second pumping shaft situated at the bottom of Newstead hill.

The first sinking was opened by Henry Lodge Snr, a former weaver from Skelmanthorpe in 1874 to a depth of 324 feet, and taken over by his son Henry Lodge Jnr following his death in 1889, running through to 1922 when, after the stresses of consecutive strikes and spiralling costs of deeper shafts, safety regulations and mechanisation by its competitors, Ryhill Main closed. During the sinking of July 1874 the sinkers fell short of blasting powder and a young lad called Edward Schofield was sent to Staincross to get some. On securing 16lbs of powder he put it in a bag and carried it over his shoulder on a stick. On his return to Ryhill he stopped off at the blacksmith's in Royston where a spark ignited the powder causing a huge explosion. Edward, the blacksmith Charles Pickard and his apprentice were all seriously burnt from the blast.

Mr John Sutcliffe was the original manager of the colliery when it opened. In 1885 Mr Jonathan Isherwood was certified manager. In 1887 Herbert Fisher was manager. In 1908 Henry Lodge Ltd was managed by Henry Fisher and the under-manager Herbert Hall.

The main buildings in the yard were the wooden headgear, the winding engine house, the boiler house with its square bricked chimney and the fan house for ventilating the underground workings. A small steam driven power plant supplied the electricity. The fitters', the blacksmiths' and the joiners' shops were all combined into one building.

The early years of transport would have involved coal being carted by horse to the Barnsley Canal at Old Royston where a terminus with screens and chutes had been erected to facilitate the loading of barges. The original Royston railway station was situated here before being moved nearer Monckton Main at the bottom of Lund Hill. A tramline was built to connect up to Notton Cut Barnsley railway and canal. As the full tubs came off the cage they were coupled together and sent down the tramway, which ran through the fields, to the Midland Railway sidings and the Barnsley Canal coal dock at Old Royston. A cinder cart track would have run direct to Ryhill station. Spoil from the pit was carted away to make roads around the district.

On 26 May 1884, at about 6 pm a fire was discovered in the underground engine house. The engine was fed with steam from the surface and sat on a wooden foundation, it was used to draw coal from the deep workings to the bottom of the shaft. 30 Men and 21 horses and ponies were in the pit at the time. Colliery manager, Mr John Sutcliffe, immediately set about rescuing the remaining men inside. Some men hearing of a fire rushed to get out and were unnecessarily scorched. The damage put 200 men temporarily out of work. The pit employed 322 men in 1901 and 299 in 1918.

Smaller mines like Ryhill were usually passengers through many of the strikes with little by the way of incidents. One such incident, on 2 August 1919, when the loyal workmen, volunteers and others, who were keeping the pumps going at Ryhill Colliery were about to go on duty, they were surrounded by a large crowd of strikers and prevented from resuming work. Fortunately there was no actual violence, the crowd adopted the "peaceful persuasion" method. The demonstrators achieved their objective so the naval ratings were called upon to man the pumps. Thirty men were at once dispatched to this pit. At this point in the strike there were 477 naval ratings attached to 22 collieries including New Monckton a few days earlier after 384 miners stormed it.

Other collieries Ryhill miners may have worked in over the years include Ellis Laithe, Havercroft Main, Hodroyd, Monckton Main 1,2 & 6 also Royston Drift (Havercroft/Royston border), Monckton 3&4 (Havercroft), Monckton 5 (Chevet), Nostell, Shafton, Wharncliffe Woodmoor 1 & 2 (Carlton) 3 & 4 (Grimethorpe), Sharlston, Fitwilliam, Hemsworth, etc. All within close proximity.

== See also ==
- Listed buildings in Ryhill
