= West Hardwick =

Village and civil parish in West Yorkshire, England

Coordinates: 53.661°N 1.368°W

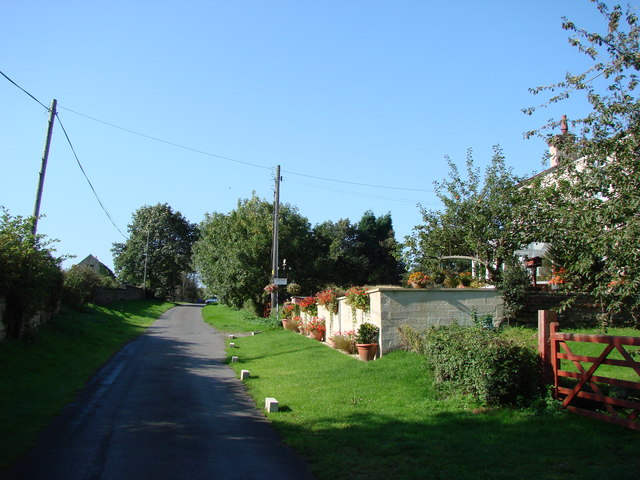
West Hardwick - Hardwick Lane

West Hardwick is a village and civil parish in the City of Wakefield in West Yorkshire, England. It has a population of 29. Until 1974 it formed part of Hemsworth Rural District. The population at the 2011 Census remained minimal. Details are included in the parish of Hessle and Hill Top.

The name Hardwick derives from the Old English phrase heorde-wīc, meaning a herd farm or a farm for livestock.
