= Sturton Grange =

Civil parish in West Yorkshire, England

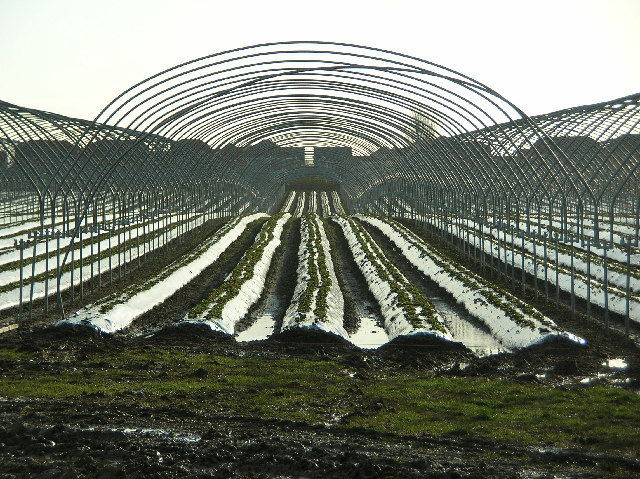
Strawberry fields at Sturton Grange

Sturton Grange is a civil parish in the City of Leeds in West Yorkshire, England. It has a population of 417, reducing to 403 at the 2011 Census.

Most of the parish area is used for agriculture. Soft fruit is grown here at an industrial scale. Population is concentrated in the northwest near the boundary with Garforth. The M1 motorway passes through the northern parts of the parish, the Leeds to Selby railway through the southern parts. Garforth Airfield is located north of the railway near the centre of the parish area. Sturton Grange is a constituent electoral ward of Aberford & District Parish Council

== Listed buildings ==
The parish contains two listed buildings that are recorded in the National Heritage List for England. Both the listed buildings are designated at Grade II, the lowest of the three grades, which is applied to "buildings of national importance and special interest". The parish is almost completely agricultural, and the listed buildings consist of a railway bridge and a milestone.

Name and location	Photograph	Date	Notes
Brady Farm Bridge; 53.79065°N 1.36072°W		1832–33	The bridge was built by the Leeds and Selby Railway to carry a track over its line. It is in sandstone and limestone, and consists of a single span. The arch springs from an impost band, and has stepped rusticated voussoirs. The bridge has straight wing walls, a moulded string course, and a low parapet ending in oval piers.
Milestone; 53.80449°N 1.36299°W		Mid 19th century	The milestone is on the west side of Aberford Road (A642 road), south of its junction with the M1 motorway. It is in stone with a triangular section with a rounded top, and has an overlay in cast iron. On the top is "WAKEFIELD & ABERFORD ROAD" and "STURTON", and on the sides are the distances to Wakefield, Aberford and Oulton.
