= Erringden =

Civil parish in West Yorkshire, England

Coordinates: 53.734°N 2.011°W

Erringden parish highlighted within Calderdale

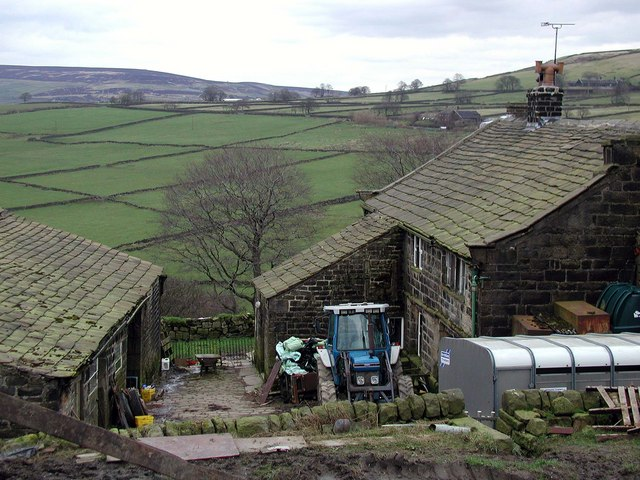
House & Farm at the Western end of the hamlet.

Erringden is a civil parish in the Metropolitan Borough of Calderdale in West Yorkshire, England. Previously it was a township within the chapelry of Heptonstall.

== History ==
The first recorded mention of Erringden is in a deed from 1321, where it is named Heyrikdene, and it is described as a park for hunting.

Plans of an estate in Erringden produced in 1761 are the first known work by the land surveyor and engineer Robert Whitworth, who went on to become one of the leading canal engineers of his generation.

In the 1870s Erringden was described as

'A township in Halifax parish, W. R. Yorkshire; adjacent to the York and Manchester railway, 7 miles NNW of Halifax. It includes part of Hebden-Bridge village, and part of Mytholmroyd hamlet; and has a fair, at Erringden-Moor, on the Friday after 11 Oct'.

== Contemporary Erringden ==
In the 2001 census it had a population of 194. By the 2011 census the population had dropped to 159.

== See also ==
- Listed buildings in Erringden

== Bibliography ==
- Skempton, Sir Alec; et al. (2002). A Biographical Dictionary of Civil Engineers in Great Britain and Ireland: Vol 1: 1500 to 1830. Thomas Telford. ISBN 0-7277-2939-X.
