= List of places in Leeds =

City of Leeds, West Yorkshire is a large city in England that includes several separate towns and villages and many other identifiable areas.

== Divisions of Leeds ==
The metropolitan borough is divided into 33 wards, each of which elects three members of Leeds City Council. The ward boundaries were last reorganised in 2004. A map of the wards is available on the council website, as is a postcode-to-ward tool. Leeds is represented by eight Members of Parliament. Since boundary changes made before the 2010 general election, the constituencies are Elmet and Rothwell, Leeds Central, Leeds East, Leeds North East, Leeds North West, Leeds West, Morley and Outwood (three out of five wards) and Pudsey. The constituency boundaries coincide with ward boundaries, so that each constituency comprises four or five complete wards; the Morley and Outwood constituency includes three Leeds wards and two Wakefield wards.

Leeds City Council divides the city into ten "Management areas" (Inner and Outer areas of North West, North East, East, South and West), which are included in this table to give a way to sort places into those ten geographical groups. Leeds is largely covered by LS post codes, most but not all of which have Leeds as their Post town to be used in postal addresses. Parts of the city have BD (Bradford) or WF (Wakefield) post codes, and some LS post codes are outside the city (in particular LS24 covering Tadcaster and LS29 covering Ilkley). The council provides a map of postcode areas.

The city's current boundaries came into being on 1 April 1974, set by the Local Government Act 1972. Before this, there existed a smaller County Borough of Leeds, and parts of today's city were in various other administrative areas. Leeds includes part or all of the former Municipal Boroughs of Morley and Pudsey, the Rural Districts of Tadcaster, Wetherby and Wharfedale, and the Urban Districts of Aireborough, Garforth, Horsforth, Otley and Rothwell.

== List ==
Click the symbol in the column heading to sort.

Placename	Leeds City Council Ward	Parliamentary Constituency	Management Area	Post- code	Post Town	Pre-1974 authority	Note
Aberford	Harewood	Elmet & Roth.	NE Outer	LS25	LEEDS	Tadcaster RD	
Adel	Adel & Wharfedale	Leeds NW	NW Outer	LS16	LEEDS	Leeds CB	
Adwalton	Morley North	Morley & Out.	S Outer	BD11	BRADFORD	Morley MB	
Ainsty	Wetherby	Elmet & Roth.	NE Outer	LS22	WETHERBY	Wetherby RD	
Aireborough					LEEDS	Aireborough UD	
Allerton Bywater	Kippax & Methley	Elmet & Roth.	E Outer	WF10	CASTLEFORD	Garforth UD	
Alwoodley	Alwoodley	Leeds NE	NE Outer	LS17	LEEDS	Leeds CB	
Arena Quarter	City & Hunslet	Leeds C	S Inner	LS1	LEEDS	Leeds CB	also LS2
Armley	Armley	Leeds W	W Inner	LS12	LEEDS	Leeds CB	
Arthington	Otley & Yeadon	Leeds NW	NW Outer	LS21	OTLEY	Wharfedale RD	
Austhorpe	Temple Newsam	Leeds E	E Outer	LS15	LEEDS	Tadcaster RD	
Bardsey cum Rigton	Harewood	Elmet & Roth.	NE Outer	LS17	LEEDS	Wetherby RD	
Bardsey	Harewood	Elmet & Roth.	NE Outer	LS17	LEEDS	Wetherby RD	
Barwick-in-Elmet	Harewood	Elmet & Roth.	NE Outer	LS15	LEEDS	Tadcaster RD	
Beck Hill	Chapel Allerton	Leeds NE	NE Inner	LS7	LEEDS	Leeds CB	
Beckett Park	Weetwood	Leeds NW	NW Inner	LS6	LEEDS	Leeds CB	
Beeston	Beeston & Holbeck	Leeds C	S Inner	LS11	LEEDS	Leeds CB	
Beeston Hill	Beeston & Holbeck	Leeds C	S Inner	LS11	LEEDS	Leeds CB	Also in City & Hunslet ward.
Belle Isle	Middleton Park	Leeds C	S Inner	LS10	LEEDS	Leeds CB	
Blenheim	Hyde Park & Woodhouse	Leeds C	NW Inner	LS2	LEEDS	Leeds CB	
Boston Spa	Wetherby	Elmet & Roth.	NE Outer	LS23	WETHERBY	Wetherby RD	
Bramham cum Oglethorpe	Wetherby	Elmet & Roth.	NE Outer	LS23	WETHERBY	Wetherby RD	
Bramhope	Adel & Wharfedale	Leeds NW	NW Outer	LS16	LEEDS	Wharfedale RD	
Bramley	Bramley & Stanningley	Leeds W	W Inner	LS13	LEEDS	Leeds CB	
Bramstan	Bramley & Stanningley	Leeds W	W Inner	LS13	LEEDS		
Burley	Kirkstall	Leeds W	NW Inner	LS5	LEEDS	Leeds CB	also LS4, LS6. Also in Headingley ward.
Burmantofts	Burmantofts & Richmond Hill	Leeds C	E Inner	LS9	LEEDS	Leeds CB	
Buslingthorpe	Chapel Allerton	Leeds NE	NE Inner	LS7	LEEDS	Leeds CB	
Calverley	Calverley & Farsley	Pudsey	W Outer	LS28	PUDSEY	Pudsey MB	
Carlton (WF3)	Rothwell	Elmet & Roth.	S Outer	WF3	WAKEFIELD	Rothwell UD	
Carlton (LS19)	Otley & Yeadon	Leeds NW	NW Outer	LS19	LEEDS	Wharfedale RD	
Chapel Allerton	Chapel Allerton	Leeds NE	NE Inner	LS7	LEEDS	Leeds CB	
Chapeltown	Chapel Allerton	Leeds NE	NE Inner	LS7	LEEDS	Leeds CB	
Churwell	Morley North	Morley & Out.	S Outer	LS27	LEEDS	Morley MB	
Clifford	Wetherby	Elmet & Roth.	NE Outer	LS23	WETHERBY	Wetherby RD	
Cockersdale	Morley North	Morley & Out.	S Outer	BD11	BRADFORD		
Collingham	Harewood	Elmet & Roth.	NE Outer	LS22	WETHERBY	Wetherby RD	
Colton	Temple Newsam	Leeds E	E Outer	LS15	LEEDS	Leeds CB	
Cookridge	Adel & Wharfedale	Leeds NW	NW Outer	LS16	LEEDS	Leeds CB	
Cottingley	Beeston & Holbeck	Leeds C	S Inner	LS11	LEEDS	Leeds CB	
Cranmer Bank	Alwoodley	Leeds NE	NE Outer	LS17	LEEDS	Leeds CB	
Cross Gates	Crossgates & Whinmoor	Leeds E	E Outer	LS15	LEEDS	Leeds CB	
Cross Green	Burmantofts & Richmond Hill	Leeds C	E Inner	LS9	LEEDS		
Drighlington	Morley North	Morley & Out.	S Outer	BD11	BRADFORD	Morley MB	
East Ardsley	Ardsley & Robin Hood	Morley & Out.	S Outer	WF3	WAKEFIELD	Morley MB	
East End Park	Burmantofts & Richmond Hill	Leeds C	E Inner	LS9	LEEDS	Leeds CB	
East Keswick	Harewood	Elmet & Roth.	NE Outer	LS17	LEEDS	Wetherby RD	
Far Headingley	Weetwood	Leeds NW	NW Inner	LS16	LEEDS	Leeds CB	
Farnley	Farnley & Wortley	Leeds W	W Outer	LS12	LEEDS	Leeds CB	
Farsley	Calverley & Farsley	Pudsey	W Outer	LS28	PUDSEY	Pudsey MB	
Fearnville	Killingbeck & Seacroft	Leeds E.	E Inner	LS8	Leeds	Leeds CB	
Fulneck Moravian Settlement	Pudsey	Pudsey	W Outer	LS28	PUDSEY	Pudsey MB	
Garforth	Garforth & Swillington	Elmet & Roth.	E Outer	LS25	LEEDS	Garforth UD	
Gildersome	Morley North	Morley & Out.	S Outer	LS27	LEEDS	Morley MB	
Gipton	Gipton & Harehills	Leeds E	E Inner	LS8	LEEDS	Leeds CB	also LS9
Gledhow	Roundhay	Leeds NE	NE Inner	LS8	LEEDS	Leeds CB	
Great Preston	Garforth & Swillington	Elmet & Roth.	E Outer	LS26	LEEDS	Tadcaster RD	
Guiseley	Guiseley & Rawdon	Pudsey	NW Outer	LS20	LEEDS	Aireborough UD	
Halton	Temple Newsam	Leeds E	E Outer	LS15	LEEDS	Leeds CB	
Halton Moor	Temple Newsam	Leeds E	E Outer	LS15	LEEDS	Leeds CB	
Harehills	Gipton & Harehills	Leeds E	E Inner	LS8	LEEDS	Leeds CB	also LS9
Harewood	Harewood	Elmet & Roth.	NE Outer	LS17	LEEDS	Wetherby RD	
Hawksworth	Kirkstall	Leeds W	NW Inner	LS5	LEEDS		
Hawksworth	Guiseley & Rawdon	Pudsey	NW Outer	LS20	LEEDS	Aireborough UD	
Headingley	Headingley & Hyde Park	Leeds NW	NW Inner	LS6	LEEDS	Leeds CB	
Holbeck	Beeston & Holbeck	Leeds C	S Inner	LS11	LEEDS	Leeds CB	
Holbeck Urban Village	Beeston & Holbeck	Leeds C	S Inner	LS11	LEEDS	Leeds CB	
Holt Park	Adel & Wharfedale	Leeds NW	NW Outer	LS16	LEEDS	Leeds CB	
Horsforth	Horsforth	Pudsey	NW Outer	LS18	LEEDS	Horsforth UD	
Hunslet	Hunslet & Riverside	Leeds C	S Inner	LS10	LEEDS	Leeds CB	
Hyde Park	Hyde Park & Woodhouse	Leeds C	NW Inner	LS6	LEEDS	Leeds CB	also in Headingley ward
Ireland Wood	Weetwood	Leeds NW	NW Inner	LS16	LEEDS	Leeds CB	
Killingbeck	Killingbeck & Seacroft	Leeds E	E Inner	LS14	LEEDS	Leeds CB	
Kippax	Kippax & Methley	Elmet & Roth.	E Outer	LS26	LEEDS	Garforth UD	
Kirkstall	Kirkstall	Leeds W	NW Inner	LS5	LEEDS	Leeds CB	also LS4
Knowsthorpe				LS9	LEEDS		
Lawnswood	Weetwood	Leeds NW	NW Inner	LS16	LEEDS	Leeds CB	
Ledsham	Kippax & Methley	Elmet & Roth.	E Outer	LS25	LEEDS	Tadcaster RD	
Ledston	Kippax & Methley	Elmet & Roth.	E Outer	WF10	CASTLEFORD	Tadcaster RD	
Leeds city centre	City & Hunslet	Leeds C	S Inner	LS1	LEEDS	Leeds CB	also LS2
Lincoln Green	Burmantofts & Richmond Hill	Leeds C	E Inner	LS9	LEEDS	Leeds CB	
Linton	Wetherby	Elmet & Roth.	NE Outer	LS22	WETHERBY	Wetherby RD	
Little London	Hyde Park & Woodhouse	Leeds C	NW Inner	LS7	LEEDS	Leeds CB	
Lofthouse	Ardsley & Robin Hood	Morley & Out.	S Outer	WF3	WAKEFIELD	Rothwell UD	
Lovell Park				LS7	LEEDS		
Mabgate	Burmantofts & Richmond Hill	Leeds C	E Inner	LS9	LEEDS	Leeds CB	
Manston				LS15	LEEDS		
Meanwood	Moortown	Leeds NE	NE Inner	LS6	LEEDS	Leeds CB	also LS7
Methley	Kippax & Methley	Elmet & Roth.	E Outer	LS26	LEEDS	Rothwell UD	
Micklefield	Kippax & Methley	Elmet & Roth.	E Outer	LS25	LEEDS	Tadcaster RD	
Micklethwaite	Wetherby	Elmet & Roth.	NE Outer	LS22	WETHERBY	Wetherby RD	
Mickletown	Kippax & Methley	Elmet & Roth.	E Outer	LS26	LEEDS	Tadcaster RD	
Middleton	Middleton Park	Leeds C	S Inner	LS10	LEEDS	Leeds CB	
Miles Hill	Chapel Allerton	Leeds NE	NE Inner	LS7	LEEDS	Leeds CB	
Moor Allerton	Alwoodley	Leeds NE	NE Outer	LS17	LEEDS	Leeds CB	
Moor Grange	Kirkstall	Leeds W	NW Inner	LS16	LEEDS	Leeds CB	
Moorside	Bramley & Stanningley	Leeds W	W Inner	LS13	LEEDS	Leeds CB	
Moortown	Moortown	Leeds NE	NE Inner	LS17	LEEDS	Leeds CB	
Morley	Morley North	Morley & Out.	S Outer	LS27	LEEDS	Morley MB	Also in Morley South ward
Newall	Otley & Yeadon	Leeds NW	NW Outer	LS21	OTLEY	Otley UD	
Oakwood	Roundhay	Leeds NE	NE Inner	LS8	LEEDS	Leeds CB	
Osmondthorpe	Burmantofts & Richmond Hill	Leeds C	E Inner	LS9	LEEDS	Leeds CB	
Otley	Otley & Yeadon	Leeds NW	NW Outer	LS21	OTLEY	Otley UD	
Oulton	Rothwell	Elmet & Roth.	S Outer	LS26	LEEDS	Rothwell UD	
Pendas Fields							
Pool-in-Wharfedale	Otley & Yeadon	Leeds NW	NW Outer	LS21	OTLEY	Wharfedale RD	
Potternewton	Chapel Allerton	Leeds NE	NE Inner	LS7	LEEDS	Leeds CB	
Potterton	Wetherby	Elmet & Roth.	NE Outer	LS15	LEEDS	Tadcaster RD	
Pudsey	Pudsey	Pudsey	W Outer	LS28	PUDSEY	Pudsey MB	
Quarry Hill	City & Hunslet	Leeds C	E Inner	LS2	LEEDS	Leeds CB	
Rawdon	Guiseley & Rawdon	Pudsey	NW Outer	LS19	LEEDS	Aireborough UD	
Richmond Hill	Burmantofts & Richmond Hill	Leeds C	E Inner	LS9	LEEDS	Leeds CB	
Robin Hood	Ardsley & Robin Hood	Morley & Out.	S Outer	WF3	WAKEFIELD		
Rodley	Bramley & Stanningley	Leeds W	W Inner	LS13	LEEDS	Leeds CB	
Rothwell	Rothwell	Elmet & Roth.	S Outer	LS26	LEEDS	Rothwell UD	
Roundhay	Roundhay	Leeds NE	NE Inner	LS8	LEEDS	Leeds CB	
Scarcroft	Harewood	Elmet & Roth.	NE Outer	LS14	LEEDS	Wetherby RD	
Scholes	Harewood	Elmet & Roth.	NE Outer	LS15	LEEDS	Tadcaster RD	
Scott Hall	Chapel Allerton	Leeds NE	NE Inner	LS7	LEEDS	Leeds CB	
Seacroft	Killingbeck & Seacroft	Leeds E	E Inner	LS14	LEEDS	Leeds CB	
Shadwell	Harewood	Elmet & Roth.	NE Outer	LS17	LEEDS	Leeds CB	
Sheepscar	Chapel Allerton	Leeds NE	NE Inner	LS7	LEEDS	Leeds CB	
Stanningley	Bramley & Stanningley	Leeds W	W Inner	LS28	PUDSEY	Pudsey MB	
Steander	Hunlet & Riverside	Leeds S	S Inner	LS9	LEEDS	Leeds CB	
Stourton	City & Hunslet	Leeds C	E Inner	LS10	LEEDS	Rothwell UD	
Sturton Grange							
Swarcliffe	Crossgates & Whinmoor	Leeds E	E Outer	LS14	LEEDS	Leeds CB	
Swillington	Garforth & Swillington	Elmet & Roth.	E Outer	LS26	LEEDS	Tadcaster RD	
Swinnow	Pudsey	Pudsey	W Outer	LS13	LEEDS	Leeds CB	
Thorner	Harewood	Elmet & Roth.	NE Outer	LS14	LEEDS	Wetherby RD	
Thorp Arch	Wetherby	Elmet & Roth.	NE Outer	LS23	WETHERBY	Wetherby RD	
Thorpe on the Hill	Ardsley & Robin Hood	Morley & Out.	S Outer	WF3	WAKEFIELD	Rothwell UD	
Tingley	Morley South	Morley & Out.	S Outer	WF3	WAKEFIELD	Morley MB	also Robin Hood and Ardsley
Tinshill	Weetwood	Leeds NW	NW Inner	LS16	LEEDS	Leeds CB	
Tyersal	Pudsey	Pudsey	W Outer	BD4	BRADFORD		
Walton	Wetherby	Elmet & Roth.	NE Outer	LS23	WETHERBY	Wetherby RD	
Weardley	Harewood	Elmet & Roth.	NE Outer	LS17	LEEDS		
Weetwood	Weetwood	Leeds NW	NW Inner	LS16	LEEDS	Leeds CB	
West Ardsley	Ardsley & Robin Hood	Morley & Out.	S Outer	WF3	WAKEFIELD	Morley MB	
West Park	Weetwood	Leeds NW	NW Inner	LS16	LEEDS	Leeds CB	
Wetherby	Wetherby	Elmet & Roth.	NE Outer	LS22	WETHERBY	Wetherby RD	
Whinmoor	Crossgates & Whinmoor	Leeds E	E Outer	LS14	LEEDS	Leeds CB	
Whitkirk	Temple Newsam	Leeds E	E Outer	LS15	LEEDS	Leeds CB	
Wike	Harewood	Elmet & Roth.	NE Outer	LS17	LEEDS		
Woodhouse	Hyde Park & Woodhouse	Leeds C	NW Inner	LS3	LEEDS	Leeds CB	also LS2, LS6
Woodlesford	Rothwell	Elmet & Roth.	S Outer	LS26	LEEDS	Rothwell UD	
Wortley	Farnley & Wortley	Leeds W	W Outer	LS12	LEEDS	Leeds CB	
Wothersome	Harewood	Elmet & Roth.	NE Outer	LS23	WETHERBY	Wetherby RD	
Wykebeck	Temple Newsam	Leeds E	E Outer	LS9	LEEDS	Leeds CB	
Yeadon	Otley & Yeadon	Leeds NW	NW Outer	LS19	LEEDS	Aireborough UD	
