= County Borough of Leeds =

Administrative division of Yorkshire, England until 1974

Coordinates: 53°47′59″N 1°32′57″W

City of Leeds County Borough of Leeds
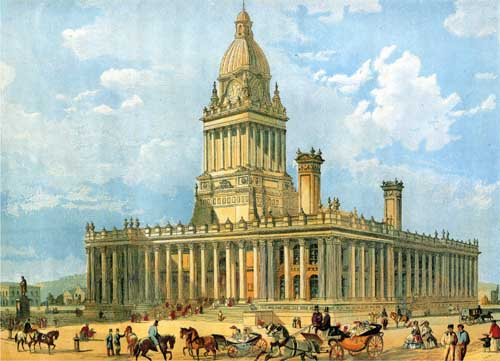
- Leeds Town Hall

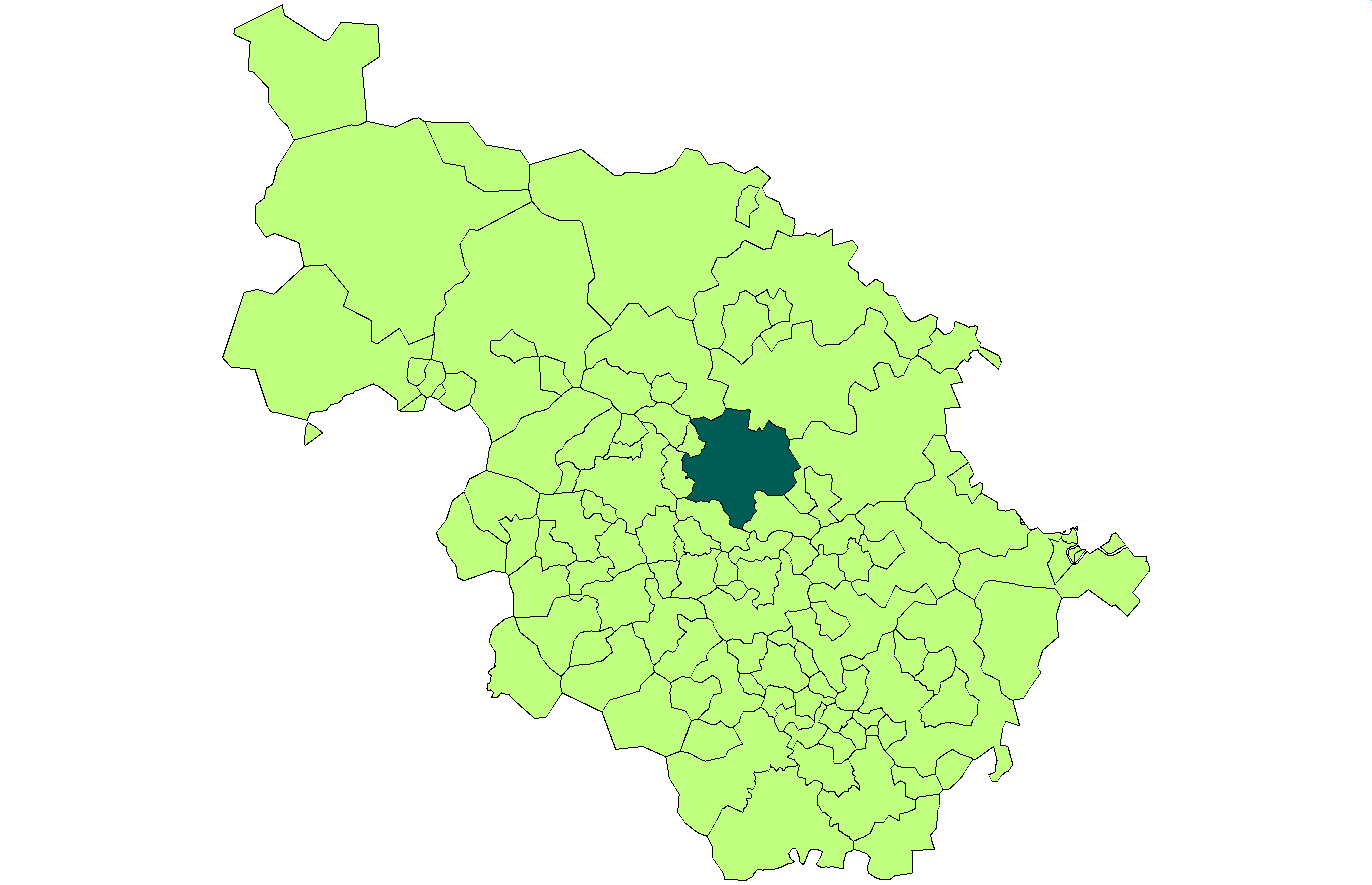
- Leeds shown within the West Riding in 1971
- Area
  - 1911: 21,593 acres (8,738 ha)
  - 1931: 38,105 acres (15,421 ha)
  - 1961: 40,612 acres (16,435 ha)
- Population
  - 1911: 445,550
  - 1931: 482,809
  - 1961: 510,676
- Density
  - 1911: 21/acre
  - 1931: 13/acre
  - 1961: 13/acre
- History
  - Origin: Leeds ancient borough
  - Created: 1836
  - Abolished: 1974
  - Succeeded by: City of Leeds (metropolitan district)
- Status: Municipal borough (1835–1889); County borough (1889–1974); City (1893–1974)
- Government
  - HQ: Leeds
  - Motto: PRO REGE ET LEGE
- Coat of arms in use until 1921

The County Borough of Leeds, and its predecessor, the Municipal Borough of Leeds, was a local government district in the West Riding of Yorkshire, England, from 1835 to 1974. Its origin was the ancient borough of Leeds, which was reformed by the Municipal Corporations Act 1835. In 1889, when West Riding County Council was formed, Leeds became a county borough outside the administrative county of the West Riding; and in 1893 the borough gained city status. The borough was extended a number of times, expanding from 21,593 acres (8,738 ha) in 1911 to 40,612 acres (16,435 ha) in 1961; adding in stages the former area of Roundhay, Seacroft, Shadwell and Middleton parishes and gaining other parts of adjacent districts. In 1971 Leeds was the fifth largest county borough by population in England. The county borough was abolished in 1974 and replaced with the larger City of Leeds, a metropolitan district of West Yorkshire.

== Origins ==
=== Manorial borough 1207–1626 ===
The Borough of Leeds was created in 1207, when Maurice Paynel, lord of the manor, granted a charter to the inhabitants of the town of Leeds. They were created "burgesses", and were given the right to hold half an acre of land, trade as they liked, and transport their goods by land or water, subject to tolls and restrictions paid to the manor. The only officer of the borough was a praetor, appointed annually at the feast of Pentecost by the Lord of the Borough. The praetor had the duty of administering justice and collecting fines and other revenues. The borough formed only a small area adjacent to a crossing of the River Aire, between the old settlement centred on Leeds Parish Church to the east and the manor house and mills to the west. The borough consisted of a single street with approximately thirty burgage plots. By the seventeenth century the title of praetor had been abandoned in favour of the more customary "bailiff", but otherwise the government of the town remained in the form introduced in the thirteenth century. An enquiry into the administration of local charities in 1620 disclosed that many of the funds were diverted by the bailiff for his private use. This, and other irregularities, led the inhabitants of Leeds to petition Charles I for a charter of incorporation.

=== Incorporated borough (1626–1836) ===
==== Incorporation ====
A charter of incorporation was granted on 13 July 1626, incorporating the entire parish of Leeds St Peter as the "Borough of Leedes in the County of York". The parish and borough consisted of eleven chapelries (Armley, Beeston, Bramley, Chapel Allerton, Farnley, Headingley cum Burley, Holbeck, Hunslet, Leeds, Potternewton and Wortley) and parts of two more (Seacroft and Temple Newsam).

The governing corporation of the borough was styled "The Alderman and Burgesses of the Borough of Leedes in the County of York", and consisted of one Alderman, nine principal burgesses and twenty assistants. The charter named the members of the first corporation, with Sir John Savile becoming the first alderman.

==== Charter of Charles II ====
In January 1643, during the English Civil War, Leeds fell to parliamentary forces. Royalist members of the corporation were replaced with those loyal to the Commonwealth. With the restoration of the monarchy in 1660, moves were made to reform the borough's government. The leading merchants of the town submitted a petition to Charles II requesting a new charter as they felt the constitution and operation of the governing body was inadequate to the needs of the town.

A second charter was duly granted on 2 November 1661, with the earlier charter withdrawn. The new corporation thus created consisted of a mayor, twelve aldermen, twenty four assistants, a recorder and a town clerk and was entitled the "Mayor, Aldermen and Burgesses of the Borough of Leedes in the County of York". The charter named the first mayor as Thomas Danby. The new corporation was given extensive powers to enforce and make laws to regulate trade and ensure the good governance of the town. From 1684 to 1689 the town was governed under a charter of James II which gave the crown power over all appointments to the town council. With the accession of William III and Mary II the 1661 charter was restored to the townspeople, and remained the governing charter until 1836.

== Municipal borough (1836–1889) ==
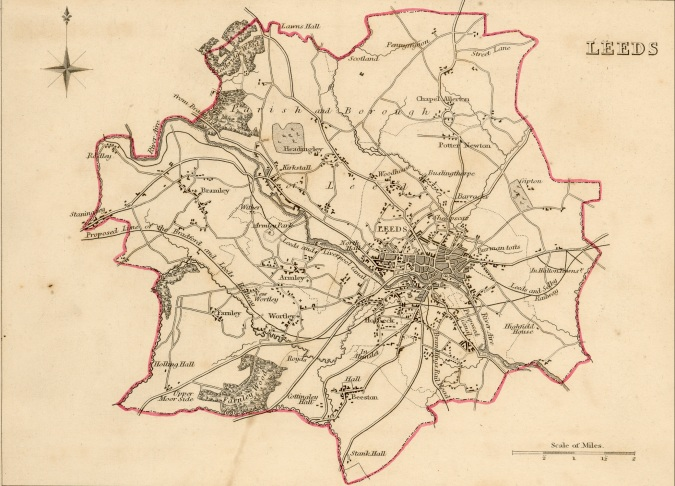
An 1835 map of Leeds by Robert Creighton

In 1833 the Whig Government of Lord Grey began enquiries into the government of the various boroughs in England and Wales, with a view to reforming their constitutions and methods of election. Following the recommendations of a royal commission, legislation was enacted as the Municipal Corporations Act 1835 (5 & 6 Will. 4. c. 76).

Leeds was among the 178 boroughs reformed by the act, becoming the "Municipal Borough of Leeds". The reformed borough was initially unchanged in area, and was divided into 12 wards, with a town council of 16 aldermen and 48 councillors, headed by a mayor. Each ward was represented by either three or six directly elected councillors. One third of the councillors retired annually. Aldermen were additional members of the council, there being one alderman for every three councillors: they had a six-year term of office, with half of the aldermanic bench elected by the council itself every three years.

| 1835 ward | Townships | No. of councillors | No. of aldermen |
|---|---|---|---|
| Bramley | Bramley, Armley, Farnley and Beeston | 6 | 2 |
| East | Part of Leeds (Note: This ward also included the part of Templenewsam township that was in the borough, although it was not named in the Order in Council.) | 3 | 1 |
| Headingley | Headingley-cum-Burley, Chapel Allerton, Potternewton | 3 | 1 |
| Holbeck | Holbeck and Wortley townships | 6 | 2 |
| Hunslet | Hunslet | 3 | 1 |
| Kirkgate | Part of Leeds | 3 | 1 |
| Mill Hill | Part of Leeds | 6 | 2 |
| North | Part of Leeds | 3 | 1 |
| North East | Part of Leeds (Note: This ward also included the part of Seacroft township (Colcotes hamlet) that was in the borough, although it was not named in the Order in Council.) | 3 | 1 |
| North West | Part of Leeds | 3 | 1 |
| South | Part of Leeds | 3 | 1 |
| West | Part of Leeds | 6 | 2 |

It was originally envisaged that the first elections would be held on 1 November 1835, with the reformed town councils holding their first meetings on 9 November following. However, the process of dividing the boroughs into wards and preparing the burgess roll or electoral register was a lengthy one, and an Order in Council was made delaying the first elections to 26 December, with the new boroughs coming into formal existence on 1 January 1836.

Leeds Improvement Act 1842
- Act of Parliament
- Parliament of the United Kingdom
- Long title: An Act for the better lighting, cleansing, sewering, and improving the Borough of Leeds in the County of York.
- Citation: 5 & 6 Vict. c. civ

Dates
- Royal assent: 16 July 1842

Text of statute as originally enacted

An early focus of the new authority was on policing and crime, with construction of a new borough prison begun in 1842. The Leeds Improvement Act 1842 (5 & 6 Vict. c. civ) gave the council further powers over markets, streets, street lighting, sewerage, building regulations, public cleansing and smoke regulation in the rapidly growing industrial city.

In 1881 the wards were redrawn, so that the borough comprised sixteen wards. The size of the town council remained the same, however, with each new ward returning one alderman and three councillors.

| 1881 ward | Townships |
|---|---|
| Armley & Wortley | Part of Wortley (The parts not in New Wortley ward, also known as Upper Wortley and Lower Wortley) |
| Bramley | Bramley and Farnley |
| Brunswick | Part of Leeds, part of Potternewton |
| Central | Part of Leeds |
| East | Part of Leeds, part of Templenewsam |
| East Hunslet | Part of Hunslet, Part of Holbeck, Part of Beeston |
| Headingley | Headingley-cum-Burley, part of Chapel Allerton |
| Holbeck | Part of Holbeck, Part of Hunslet, Hunslet (detached): also known as Littletown |
| Mill Hill | Part of Leeds |
| New Wortley | Part of Wortley (The ecclesiastical district of St John's, New Wortley) |
| North | Part of Leeds, part of Potternewton, part of Chapel Allerton |
| North East | Part of Leeds, part of Potternewton (Note: This ward also included the part of Seacroft township that was in the borough, although it was not named in the Order in Council. In 1894 the area was transferred to Potternewton township.) |
| North West | Part of Leeds, part of Potternewton |
| South | Part of Leeds, part of Hunslet |
| West | Part of Leeds |
| West Hunslet | Part of Hunslet, Part of Holbeck, Part of Beeston |

== County borough 1889–1974 ==
The Local Government Act 1888 created elected county councils to administer services throughout England and Wales. Where a municipal borough had a population of more than 50,000 at the 1881 Census it was created a county borough, with the powers and duties of both a borough and county council.

As Leeds had an 1881 population of 309,119 it duly became a county borough on 1 April 1889. The borough, while independent of the West Riding County Council for local government, remained part of the county for purposes such as the administration of justice and lieutenancy.

The change of status in 1889 made no change to the boundaries of the borough or the size of the council.

=== City status and lord mayoralty ===
Until 1889 the right to the title of "city" in the United Kingdom was linked to the presence of an Anglican cathedral. In that year Birmingham, Dundee and Belfast were granted letters patent raising them to cities by virtue of their population, economic importance and history of good municipal government.

In 1892 another borough in the West Riding, Sheffield, announced that it was seeking the grant of city status to celebrate the golden jubilee of the town's incorporation, which was to occur in 1893. When the members of Leeds Town Council became aware of the application by Sheffield, which was both smaller in population and of more recent creation than Leeds, they immediately began the process of applying for the dignity themselves. A petition was approved on 4 January 1893, which set out the reasons it was felt that Leeds deserved to become a city: these were the antiquity of the town, its many charters, its large area, its population that was "approaching 400,000", the fact that it was the largest municipality not to be a city, and its commercial importance for the woollen industry.

A delegation from Leeds, including two Members of Parliament (MPs), met with the Home Secretary, H. H. Asquith, on 27 January to press the borough's case. Along with the claims of the borough as set out in the original petition, the delegation made two more points: Leeds was the only university town not a city, and Leeds and Sheffield were the only boroughs returning five MPs to the House of Commons without the status (of a city).

The Home Secretary forwarded the petitions of both boroughs to The Queen on 3 February, recommending that the honour be granted in both cases as they were the "only towns in the United Kingdom with a population exceeding 300,000 to which the title of City, enjoyed by many smaller of less important places, has not been granted; and that both appear to be well fitted by their loyalty, public spirit, and industrial progress, for this mark of your Majesty's favour."

On 7 February, Sir Godfrey Lushington, permanent secretary to the Home Office, wrote to the mayors of both towns signifying that the applications had been approved. The award was made by letters patent on 13 February, and was announced in The London Gazette on 21 February:

The Queen has been pleased, by Letters Patent under the Great Seal of the United Kingdom, bearing date the 13th February 1893, to ordain and declare that the Borough of Leeds shall be a City, and shall be called and styled "The City of Leeds".

Four years later the diamond jubilee of the accession of Queen Victoria occurred. As part of the celebrations it was announced on 21 June that the mayor of Leeds "shall in future bear the title of Lord Mayor". The award which empowered the Lord Mayor to enjoy and use all the rights, privileges, pre-eminencies and advantages to "such degree duly and of right belonging" was made by Letters Patent dated 12 July, and was published in the London Gazette on the following day:

The Queen has been pleased, by Letters Patent under the Great Seal of the United Kingdom of Great Britain and Ireland, bearing date the 12th July, 1897 to ordain that the Chief Magistrate, now, and for the time being, of the City of Leeds, shall be styled Lord Mayor of Leeds.

=== Parishes to 1912 ===
| 1 Leeds; 2 Osmondthorpe; 3 Hunslet; 4 Holbeck; 5 Armley and Bramley |
Parishes 1904 – 1912

Townships and chapelries which were separately rated for poor law purposes were formed into civil parishes in 1866. The borough of Leeds contained eleven parishes and part of two others, and no changes were made to their boundaries until 1894. The Local Government Act 1894 provided that no parish could lie in more than one local government area, with parishes being divided or amalgamated as required.

In Leeds this was effected by constituting the part of Temple Newsam parish within the city a separate parish of Osmondthorpe, and merging the portion of Seacroft that lay within the municipal boundaries with the existing parish of Potternewton. The number of parishes into which the city was divided was reduced to five in 1904 by the following mergers:

- Armley and Bramley formed from Armley, Bramley and Wortley
- Holbeck (unchanged)
- Hunslet (unchanged)
- Leeds formed from Beeston, Chapel Allerton, Farnley, Headingley cum Burley, Leeds, Potternewton
- Osmondthorpe (unchanged)

=== 1912 extension ===
The city boundaries remained unchanged from 1836 until 1912. In 1904 the city council applied unsuccessfully to the Local Government Board for an enlargement of the county borough. A second application was made late in 1911. The corporation sought to add 4,839 acres (19.58 km^{2}) to the north and east of the city: the parishes of Roundhay and Seacroft (comprising Leeds Rural District), the parish of Shadwell (from Wetherby Rural District) and the Cross Gates area of the parish of Barwick in Elmet (from Tadcaster Rural District). The proposed extension would increase the county borough's population by 7,603 to 452,171. An inquiry was held in January 1912, at which the strong opposition of the West Riding County Council and all the parish and rural district councils involved was made clear. On 4 May the town clerk of Leeds was informed that the extension had been granted, with the exception of 169 acres (0.68 km^{2}) of agricultural land with an estimated population of 50 to 100, by the Leeds (Extension) Order 1912, confirmed by the Local Government Board's Provisional Orders Confirmation (No. 12) Act 1912 (2 & 3 Geo. 5. c. cxxxviii).

The extension took effect on 9 November 1912, with the added areas initially being added to the existing north ward and to the parish of Leeds.

=== 1920 extension ===
| 1 Leeds; 2 Osmondthorpe; 3 Hunslet; 4 Holbeck; 5 Armley and Bramley |
Parishes 1920 – 1925

Leeds Corporation Act 1919
- Act of Parliament
- Parliament of the United Kingdom
- Long title: An Act to empower the lord mayor aldermen and citizens of the city of Leeds to acquire lands for providing further housing accommodation and to construct tramways street improvements and waterworks to extend the boundary of the city and for other purposes.
- Citation: 9 & 10 Geo. 5. c. liii

Dates
- Royal assent: 15 August 1919

Other legislation
- Repealed by: West Yorkshire Act 1980

Status: Repealed

Text of statute as originally enacted

In 1919 the city council sought another extension, this time to the south, by taking in the parish of Middleton from Hunslet Rural District. The boundary change was granted by the Leeds Corporation Act 1919 (9 & 10 Geo. 5. c. liii) and took effect on 1 April 1920, and Middleton formed a 17th ward, electing three councillors and pne alderman to the city council, which was increased in size accordingly. The parish of Middleton was abolished, with its area added to the existing parish of Hunslet. The extra territory was acquired by the county borough for a major scheme of council housing, the construction of which commenced almost immediately. On 1 April 1925 the five parishes in the county borough were united into a single parish of Leeds.

=== 1928 extension ===
Leeds Corporation Act 1927
- Act of Parliament
- Parliament of the United Kingdom
- Long title: An Act to extend the boundaries of the city of Leeds to confer further powers upon the lord mayor aldermen and citizens of that city relative to the acquisition of the undertaking of the Crossgates Halton and Seacroft Gas Company Limited the construction of street improvements and other matters and for other purposes.
- Citation: 17 & 18 Geo. 5. c. ci

Dates
- Royal assent: 29 July 1927

Text of statute as originally enacted

In 1927 Leeds Corporation promoted a bill to add further areas to the city, namely Gildersome Urban District, and parts of the rural districts of Hunslet, Tadcaster and Wharfedale (the parishes of Adel cum Eccup, Alwoodley, Austhorpe – except for a detached part – and Templenewsham). The Leeds Corporation Act 1927 (17 & 18 Geo. 5. c. ci), as passed, omitted Gildersome and most of Austhorpe from the area added to Leeds. The extension, which took effect on 1 April 1928 added approximately 7,131 acres (28.86 km^{2}) to the county borough. The area added comprised the parishes of Adel cum Eccup and Alwoodley to the north, and Templenewsham with 206 acres (0.83 km^{2}) from the parish of Austhorpe to the east.

In 1930 the wards of the county borough were redrawn, necessitating a general election of the entire city council. Twenty-six wards were created, each returning three councillors and one alderman. The membership of the council was increased from 68 (51 councillors and 17 aldermen) to 104 (78 councillors and 26 aldermen). The twenty-six wards were as follows:

- Armley & New Wortley
- Beeston
- Blenheim
- Bramley
- Burmantofts
- Central
- Cross Gates & Templenewsham
- East Hunslet
- Far Headingley
- Farnley
- Harehills
- Holbeck North
- Holbeck South
- Hunslet Carr & Middleton
- Hyde Park
- Kirkstall
- Mill Hill and South
- North
- Osmondthorpe
- Potternewton
- Richmond Hill
- Roundhay
- West Hunslet
- Westfield
- Woodhouse
- Wortley and Upper Armley

On 1 April 1937 the boundary of the county borough with the surrounding areas of the West Riding was adjusted under a county review order. The city exchanged areas with the following districts:

| Local government district | Area added to county borough | Area removed from county borough |
|---|---|---|
| Horsforth Urban District | 98 acres (0.40 km^{2}) | – |
| Pudsey Municipal Borough | 3 acres (0.012 km^{2}) | – |
| Tadcaster Rural District | 53 acres (0.21 km^{2}) | 34 acres (0.14 km^{2}) |
| Wetherby Rural District | 24 acres (0.097 km^{2}) | – |
| Wharfedale Rural District | 45 acres (0.18 km^{2}) | 1 acre (0.0040 km^{2}) |

In 1950 the city council petitioned for an alteration in the number and boundaries of the municipal wards, and a consequent change in the number of aldermen and councillors. The petition was successful, with an Order in Council made on 28 July dividing the city into twenty-eight wards:

- Allerton
- Armley
- Beeston
- Blenheim
- Bramley
- Burmantofts
- City
- Cross Gates
- East Hunslet
- Far Headingley
- Halton
- Harehills
- Holbeck
- Hunslet Carr
- Hyde Park
- Kirkstall
- Meanwood
- Middleton
- Moortown
- Osmondthorpe
- Potternewton
- Richmond Hill
- Roundhay
- Stanningley
- Wellington
- Westfield
- Woodhouse
- Wortley

The redrawing of wards made a general election of the entire council necessary in May 1951. The new council had a membership of 112: 84 councillors and 28 aldermen.

=== 1957 extension ===
Leeds Corporation Act 1956
- Act of Parliament
- Parliament of the United Kingdom
- Long title: An Act to extend the boundary of the City of Leeds; to confer further powers upon the Lord Mayor Aldermen and Citizens of the City of Leeds with reference to lands and to their undertakings; to empower them to establish an undertaking for the supply of heat; to make further provision for the improvement health local government and finances of the city; and for other purposes.
- Citation: 4 & 5 Eliz. 2. c. lxxv

Dates
- Royal assent: 2 August 1956

Following the Second World War a Local Government Boundary Commission was appointed to review administrative structures throughout England and Wales. While the commission was in existence, local authorities were not permitted to make unilateral proposals for boundary changes. Although the commission recommended that Leeds should form the basis of a new unitary "one tier county" no action was taken. The commission itself was wound up in 1949, and the final enlargement of the county borough took place under the Leeds Corporation Act 1956 (4 & 5 Eliz. 2. c. lxxv), on 1 April 1957. 2,322 acres (9.40 km^{2}) of Tadcaster Rural District were added to the city. The 1958 commission was disbanded in 1966, and the Redcliffe-Maud Commission appointed in its place. When their report was published in 1969, they recommended a system of large unitary authorities. A new Leeds authority was proposed, with an area of 317,000 acres (1,280 km^{2}) and a population of 840,000. The boundaries would have included a large rural area including part of the Yorkshire Dales and the town of Harrogate. The proposal was welcomed by Leeds City Council. Following a change of government, a white paper issued in 1971 rejected the unitary structure and instead proposed a metropolitan county of West Yorkshire, with Leeds forming a district in a two-tier system. During the passing of the subsequent legislation, which was enacted as the Local Government Act 1972, the boundaries of the Leeds Metropolitan District (or District 6b) were altered. Knaresborough and Harrogate were removed (becoming the basis of a non-metropolitan district in North Yorkshire) while Rothwell was added from the neighbouring Wakefield district.

=== Metropolitan borough ===
The 1972 legislation came into effect on 1 April 1974, with the county borough ceasing to exist at midnight on 31 March. The county borough's area was combined with that of the Municipal Borough of Morley, the Municipal Borough of Pudsey, Aireborough Urban District, Horsforth Urban District, Otley Urban District, Garforth Urban District, Rothwell Urban District and parts of Tadcaster Rural District, Wetherby Rural District and Wharfedale Rural District from the West Riding. The new Leeds district was one of five metropolitan districts in West Yorkshire. It was granted a borough and city status to become the City of Leeds. No successor parish was formed so the county borough area became unparished, though other parishes were formed within the new district.

Metropolitan district of Leeds formed 1974
| (Former county borough in grey): 1. Municipal Borough of Morley; 2. Municipal Borough of Pudsey; 3. Aireborough Urban District; 4. Horsforth Urban District; 5. Otley Urban District; 6. Garforth Urban District; 7. Rothwell Urban District; 8. 8a. Tadcaster Rural District; 9. Wetherby Rural District; 10. Wharfedale Rural District |
