= Newall, West Yorkshire =

Coordinates: 53.913°N 1.698°W

Newall
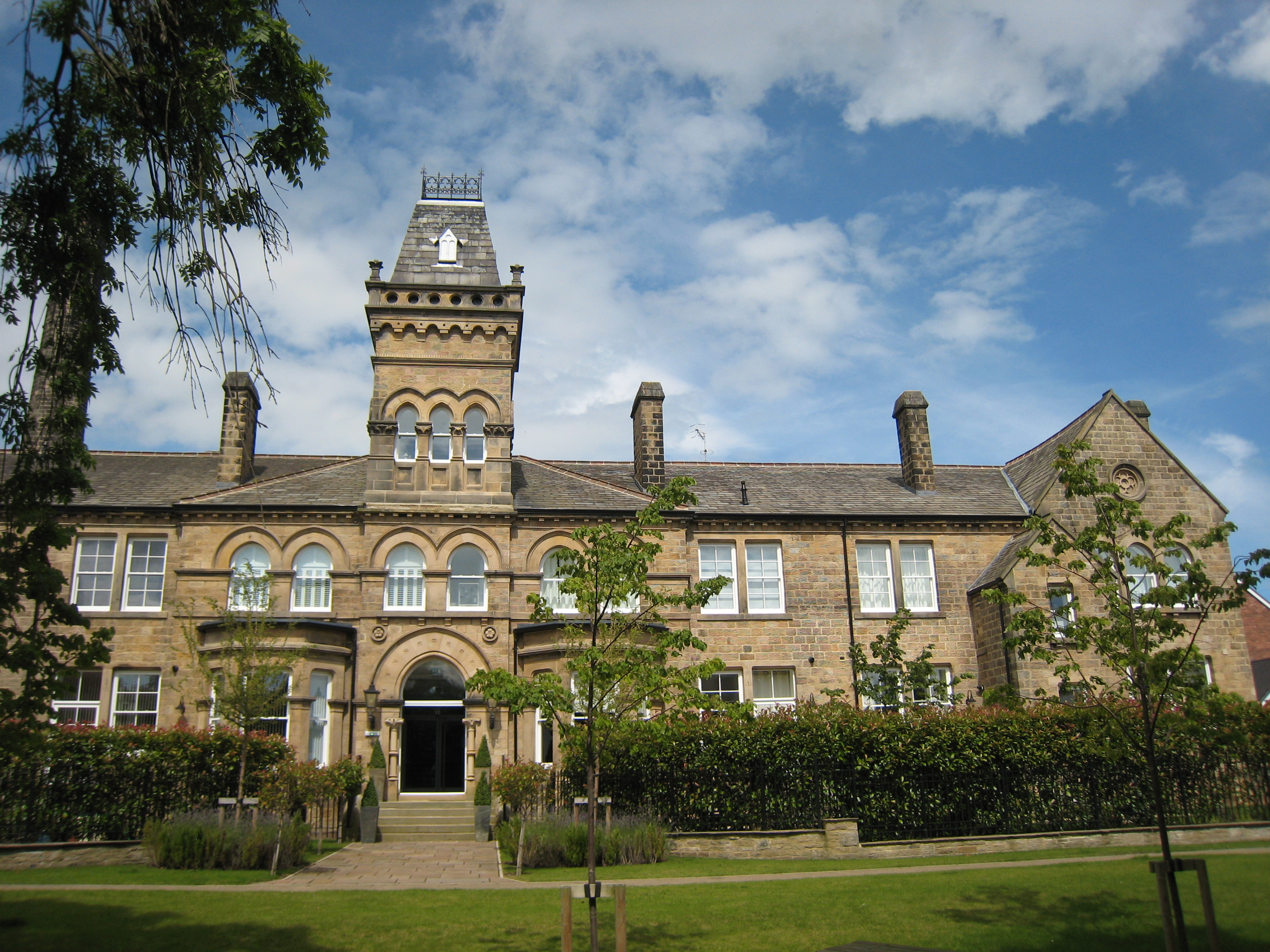
- Former Workhouse, then hospital, now flats

- Location within West Yorkshire
- OS grid reference: SE201463
- Civil parish: Otley
- Metropolitan borough: City of Leeds
- Metropolitan county: West Yorkshire
- Region: Yorkshire and the Humber
- Country: England
- Sovereign state: United Kingdom
- Post town: OTLEY
- Postcode district: LS21
- Dialling code: 01943
- Police: West Yorkshire
- Fire: West Yorkshire
- Ambulance: Yorkshire
- UK Parliament: Leeds North West

Newall (historically also spelt Newell) is an area of Otley in West Yorkshire, England. It lies on the north bank of the River Wharfe, across Otley Bridge from the central area of the town. The place-name, recorded in 1166 as Niuhale, simply means "New Hall".

== Notable features ==
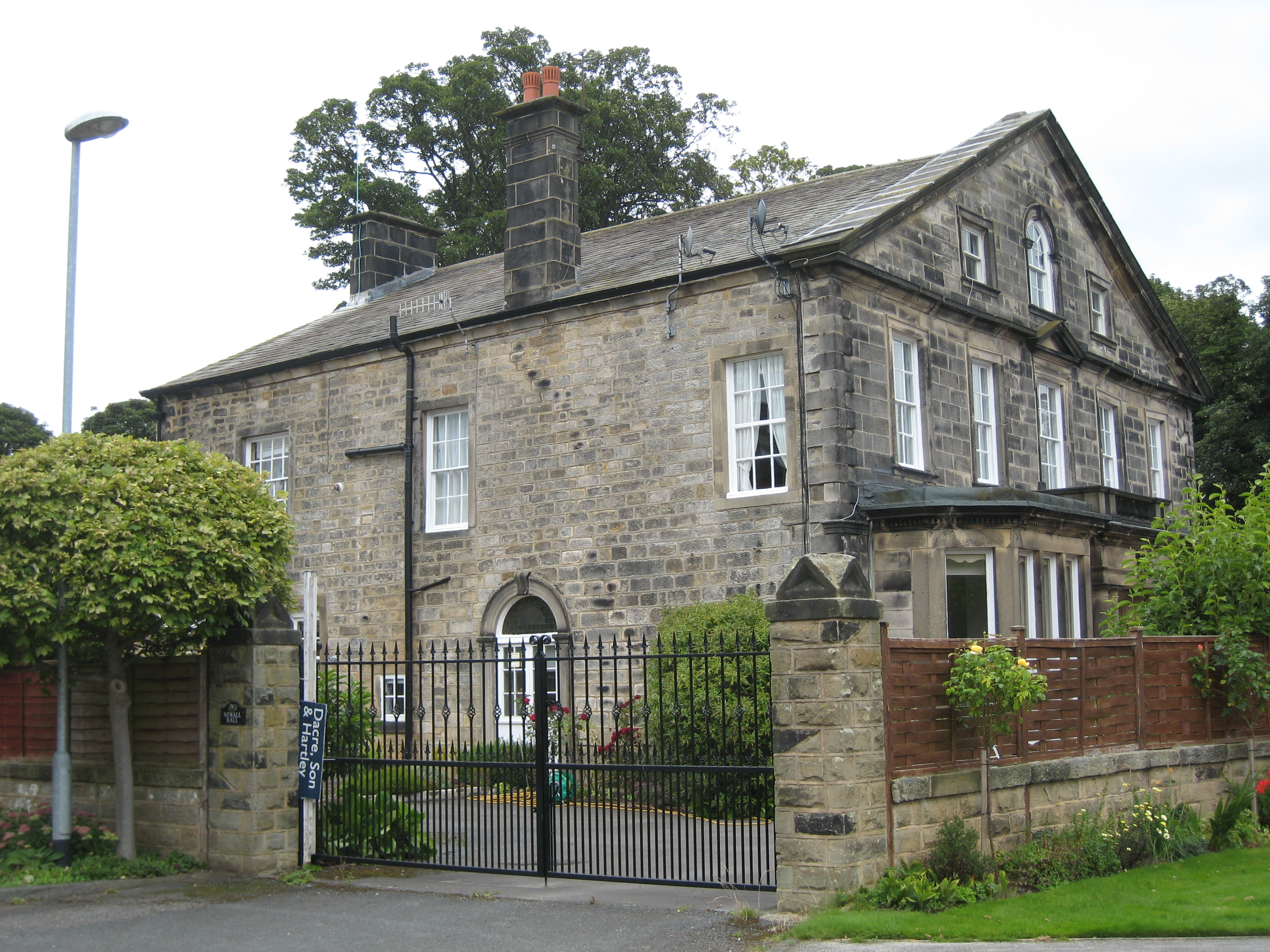
Newall Hall

Newall contains Prince Henry's Grammar School, Wharfedale Hospital and adjacent to it, Wharfedale Park, a 21st century housing development featuring conversions of many of the listed buildings of the former hospital including the 1873 workhouse. Newall Hall is the remaining part of an 18th century listed building, now converted into flats. An older building, Newall Old Hall was painted by Turner but was demolished in 1928 for council housing. Newall Grange on Weston Road was built in the 1880s. It also contains Wharfemeadows Park, with extensive gardens on land beside the River Wharfe donated to the town in 1924 by the Fawkes family.

== History ==
Newall was historically part of the township of Newall with Clifton in the ancient parish of Otley in the West Riding of Yorkshire. The township became a separate civil parish in 1866. In 1903 Newall was transferred from the civil parish of Newall with Clifton to the civil parish and urban district of Otley. In 1974 Newall was transferred, with the rest of Otley, to the City of Leeds Metropolitan Borough in the new county of West Yorkshire, whereas the civil parish of Newall with Clifton (which, despite its name, no longer included Newall) was transferred to Harrogate District in North Yorkshire. Newall now falls within the Otley and Yeadon ward of the Leeds Metropolitan Council.

== Housing ==
It was in 1920 that Otley Town council began building housing estates on the north side of the river, making 214 council houses in Newall by the end of 1922. Increased government subsidies from the Housing (Financial Provisions) Act 1924 led to further houses being constructed on the East side of Newall Carr Road, in the Crescent and Crossways. In 1947 the council began developing land to the west of Newall Carr Road, along Weston Lane. These developments were accompanied by the construction of Newall Infants School in 1935 and Weston Lane Primary School in 1953. Private building also commenced in the 1920s and 1930s, but slowed during the war years until the 1960s, then several smaller developments during the 1970s, with additional schools. The 1980s included a private development around Newall Hall.

== See also ==
- List of places in Leeds
