= Listed buildings in East Keswick =

East Keswick is a civil parish in the metropolitan borough of the City of Leeds, West Yorkshire, England. The parish contains nine listed buildings that are recorded in the National Heritage List for England. All the listed buildings are designated at Grade II, the lowest of the three grades, which is applied to "buildings of national importance and special interest". The parish contains the village of East Keswick and the surrounding countryside. The listed buildings consist of houses, farmhouses and farm buildings, a public house, and two milestones.

== Buildings ==
Name and location	Photograph	Date	Notes
Moorend Farmhouse; 53.90166°N 1.47141°W	—	Late 17th century	A wing was added to the rear in the 19th century. The farmhouse is in stone with quoins, and a stone slate roof with coped gables and kneelers. There are two storeys, a double-depth plan, two bays, and a rear wing. The doorway has a moulded surround, composite jambs, and a Tudor arched lintel. In the wing is a doorway with tie-stone jambs and a lintel with incised voussoirs. The windows have double-chamfered surrounds, and most mullions have been removed.
One-up, One-down Cottage; 53.89499°N 1.45402°W	—	Early to mid 18th century	The cottage, which has been converted into a garage, is in stone, with quoins, a stone slate eaves course, and a pantile roof. There are two storeys and one bay. It contains a doorway, an inserted garage door, and a small window on the front, and at the rear is a casement window and a sliding sash window above.
The Old Parsonage; 53.89556°N 1.45365°W	—	Early to mid 18th century	A farmhouse, then a parsonage, when it was extended, and later a private house. It is in stone and has a roof of blue Welsh slate, coped on the right. There are two storeys and the original part has three bays. The doorway has monolithic jambs, and the windows are sashes.
Wayside Cottage and Stocks Hill Cottage; 53.89587°N 1.45303°W		Mid to late 18th century	A house, at one time divided, it is in stone with quoins, bands, and a stone slate roof with coped gables and kneelers. There are two storeys and two bays. In the centre are paired doorways, the right one blocked, the left with a keystone. The windows have keystones, and those in the upper floor are sliding sashes.
Manor House Farmhouse; 53.89474°N 1.45629°W	—	c 1800	A stone farmhouse with quoins, and a stone slate roof with coped gables and kneelers. There are two storeys, a symmetrical front of three bays, and a lower single-bay wing, recessed on the right. The central doorway has monolithic jambs and a fanlight. Above it is a blind window and the other windows are sashes with wedge lintels, incised voussoirs, and projecting sills.
Barn to the rear of Manor House Farmhouse; 53.89484°N 1.45642°W	—	c 1800	The barn is in stone with quoins and a grey tile roof. There are two storeys and five bays. In the centre is a segmental-arched cart entry with composite jambs and voussoirs, which is flanked by doorways with monolithic jambs and deep lintels, and square windows.
The Old Star; 53.89397°N 1.45210°W		Early to mid 19th century	A farmhouse, later a public house, it is in stone with a bracketed cornice supporting the gutter, and a roof of blue Welsh slate. There are two storeys and three bays. The central doorway has a lintel with incised voussoirs, and it is flanked by canted bay windows. The middle window in the upper floor is blind.
Milestone near Lumby Lane; 53.90087°N 1.46623°W		Mid 19th century	The milestone is on the south side of Harewood Avenue (A659 road). It is in stone overlaid with cast iron, and has a triangular section and an arched top. On the top is "TADCASTER & OTLEY ROAD" and "EAST KESWICK", and on the sides are the distances to Harewood, Wetherby, Otley, Boston Spa, and Tadcaster.
Milestone near Moor Farm; 53.90456°N 1.44230°W	—	Mid 19th century	The milestone is on the north side of Harewood Road (A659 road). It is in stone overlaid with cast iron, and has a triangular section and an arched top. On the top is "TADCASTER & OTLEY ROAD" and "EAST KESWICK", and on the sides are the distances to Harewood, Wetherby, Otley, Boston Spa, and Tadcaster.
