= Wetherby Rural District =

Former local government area in the UK

Coordinates: 53.9276°N 1.3839°W

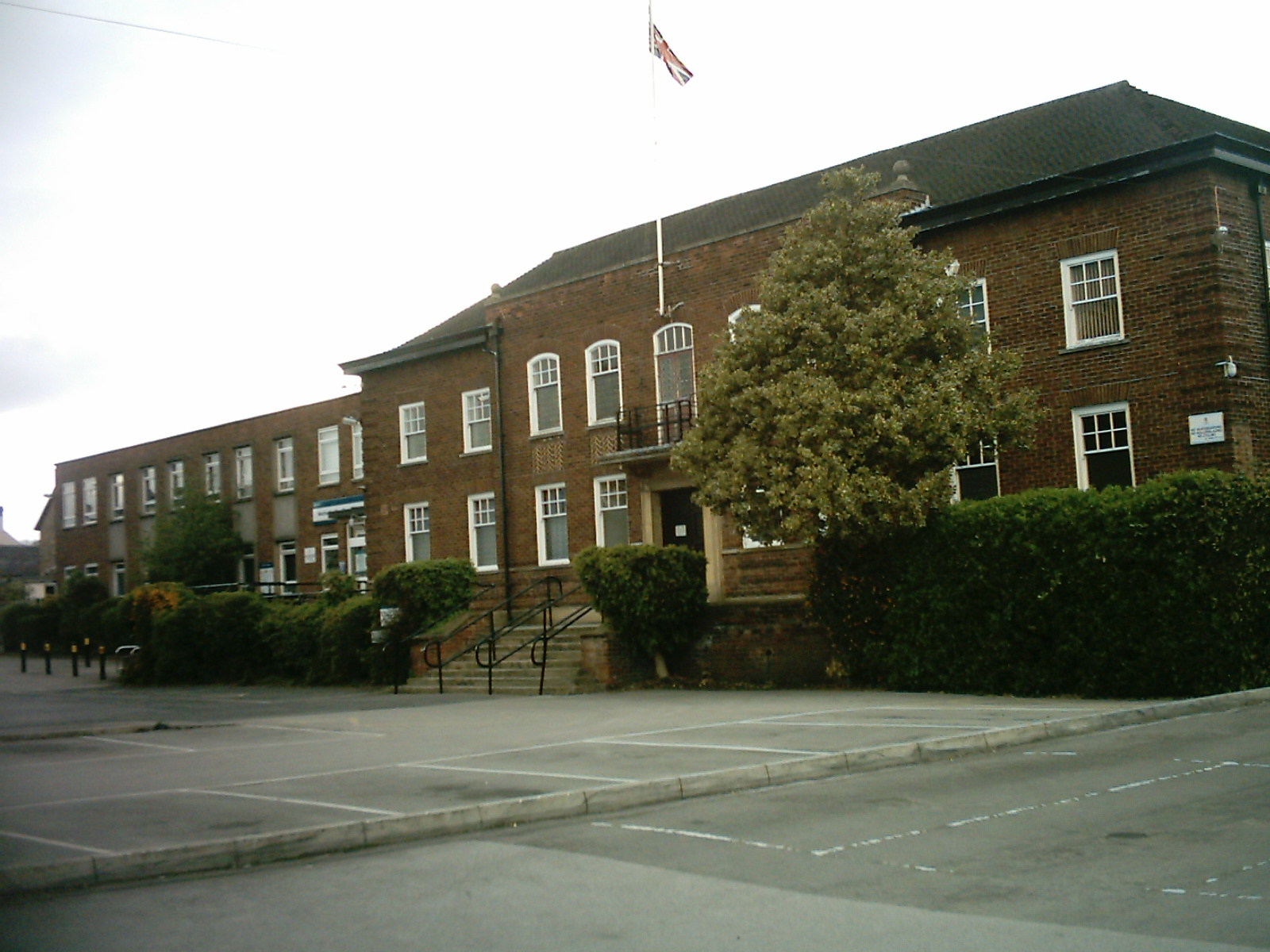
The former offices of the Wetherby Rural District Council, now used by Leeds City Council and Wetherby Town Council.

Wetherby was a rural district in the West Riding of Yorkshire from 1894 to 1974. It was named after the town of Wetherby.

It was abolished in 1974 under the Local Government Act 1972, and split between two new districts. The parishes of Bardsey cum Rigton, Boston Spa, Bramham cum Oglethorpe, Clifford, Collingham, East Keswick, Harewood, Scarcroft, Thorner, Thorp Arch, Walton, Wetherby and Wothersome went to the City of Leeds metropolitan borough in West Yorkshire, with the rest becoming part of the borough of Harrogate in North Yorkshire.
