= Listed buildings in Scarcroft =

Scarcroft is a civil parish in the metropolitan borough of the City of Leeds, West Yorkshire, England. The parish contains eight listed buildings that are recorded in the National Heritage List for England. All the listed buildings are designated at Grade II, the lowest of the three grades, which is applied to "buildings of national importance and special interest". The parish contains the village of Scarcroft and the surrounding countryside, and the listed buildings consist of houses, a former toll house, and three milestones.

== Buildings ==
Name and location	Photograph	Date	Notes
Milepost at NGR 351409; 53.86349°N 1.46687°W		Mid 18th century	The milepost is on the west side of Bay Horse Lane, and is in sandstone. It consists of a square post 1 metre (3 ft 3 in) high with a rounded top. The inscriptions include the distances to Tadcaster and to Otley.
Milestone, Milner Lane; 53.86778°N 1.42814°W		Late 18th century (probable)	The milestone by the side of Milner Lane at its junction with Thorner Lane consists of an upright stone with incised lettering. On the east face is the distance to Wetherby and on the west face is the illegible distance to Leeds.
High Gables; 53.87087°N 1.44580°W	—	1830	A house in rendered brick with stone dressings, rusticated quoins and a Welsh blue slate roof with shaped coped gables and finials. There are two storeys and attics, and three bays, each bay gabled and facing a different angle. The central doorway has a moulded surround, a Tudor arched lintel, and a hood on brackets, and to the right is a date plaque. The windows have composite jambs and chamfered mullions.
Scarcroft Lodge; 53.86416°N 1.44660°W	—	1830	A large house later extended and used for other purposes. It is in stone on a plinth, with a moulded cornice, a blocking course with acroteria on the corners, a Welsh blue slate roof, and two storeys. The original part has sides of five bays, and there are later extensions on the left and at the rear. On the front is a Tuscan porch, and a doorway with monolithic jambs. The windows are sashes, and in the right return is a two-storey bow window. The extension on the left has five bays, and contains a two-storey canted bay window. To the right is a three-storey clock tower with rusticated quoins, corner pilasters, a clock face in a semicircular-arched window with an architrave, an impost, and a keystone, over which is a cornice and a pierced parapet.
Beacon Hill; 53.86600°N 1.46493°W	—	Early to mid 19th century	A large house with a coach house, both in sandstone with blue slate roofs. The house has an uneven U-shaped plan, with the front range facing south, containing four bays, a string course, and a parapet, and two gables with corbelled kneelers. The second bay projects and contains a canted bay window. The windows have small panes, some are mullioned and transomed and some are sashes. The coach house forms the north side of the courtyard and has three bays. It contains a segmental-arched carriage entrance, doors, windows, and dove openings.
Scarcroft Toll Bar; 53.87185°N 1.44600°W		Early to mid 19th century	A former toll house, it is in stone with a stone slate roof, and has a single storey. The doorway has a monolithic lintel, and there is a small window to the left. The right return contains a sash window, and in the left return is a small opening.
Oaklands Manor; 53.86543°N 1.43313°W		c. 1844	A large house, later used for other purposes, it is in stone on a plinth, the ground floor rusticated, with giant pilasters, a band, a frieze, a projecting eaves cornice, a blocking course, and a hipped roof of Westmorland green slate. There are two storeys, attics and cellars, and a symmetrical front of three bays, with a central triangular pediment. Steps flanked by drums with urns lead up to a porch with fluted Tuscan columns, and a doorway with an architrave and a fanlight. The windows are sashes. The rear has projecting wings and a single Tuscan column supporting a porch. In the right return are two bow windows.
Milestone south of Scarcroft village 53.86837°N 1.44874°W		Mid 19th century	The milestone is on the east side of Wetherby road (A58 road), south of the village. It is in stone with a triangular section and a rounded top with cast iron overlay. The top is inscribed "LEEDS & COLLINGHAM ROAD" and "SCARCROFT", and on the right faces are the distances to Collingham, Leeds and Wetherby.
