= Leeds Rural District =

Former local government area of Leeds, West Yorkshire, England

Coordinates: 53.833°N 1.475°W

Leeds
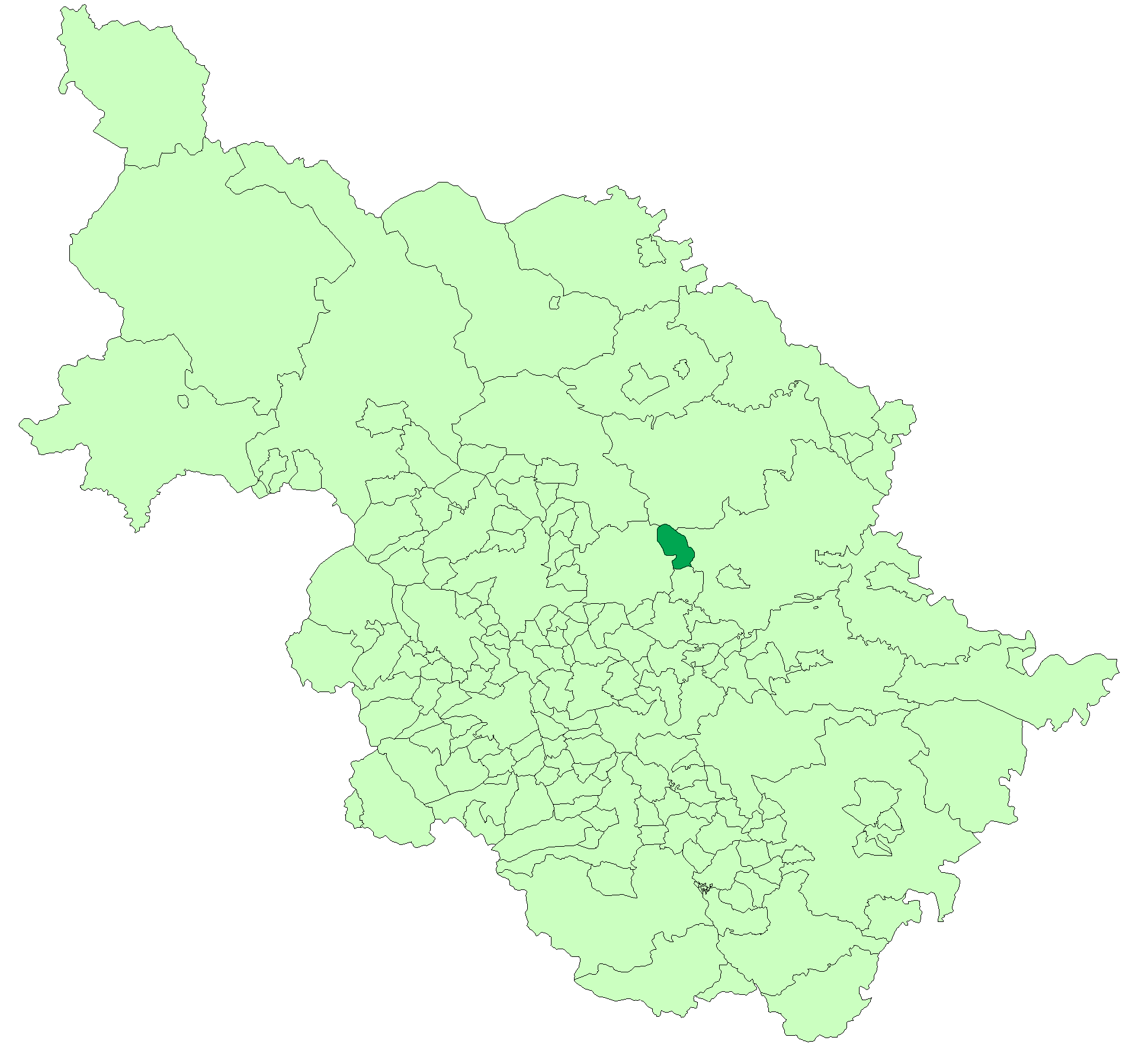
- Area
  - 1901: 3,290 acres (13.3 km^{2})
  - 1911: 3,290 acres (13.3 km^{2})
- Population
  - 1901: 3,210
  - 1911: 4,289
- History
  - Origin: Leeds Rural Sanitary District
  - Created: 1894
  - Abolished: 1912
  - Succeeded by: County Borough of Leeds
- Status: Rural district
- Government: Leeds Rural District Council
  - HQ: Leeds
- Subdivisions
  - Type: Civil parishes

Leeds was, from 1894 to 1912, a rural district in the administrative county of Yorkshire, West Riding, England. It comprised an area adjacent to, but not including, the City of Leeds. It was alternatively known as the Rural District of Leeds (Roundhay and Seacroft).

== Creation ==
Parishes in the Rural District, Roundhay (left) and Seacroft (right)

The district was formed by the Local Government Act 1894 as successor to the Leeds Rural Sanitary District. A directly elected rural district council (RDC) replaced the previous rural sanitary authority, which had consisted of the poor law guardians for the area. The district comprised the two parishes of Roundhay and Seacroft. The headquarters of the council lay outside the district at the Poor Law Offices, East Parade, in the County Borough of Leeds.

== Abolition ==
On 9 November 1912 the rural district was abolished when the boundaries of County Borough of Leeds were extended and the two parishes became part of the city, along with neighbouring Shadwell.
