= Wothersome =

Village and civil parish in West Yorkshire, England

Coordinates: 53°52′39″N 1°23′42″W

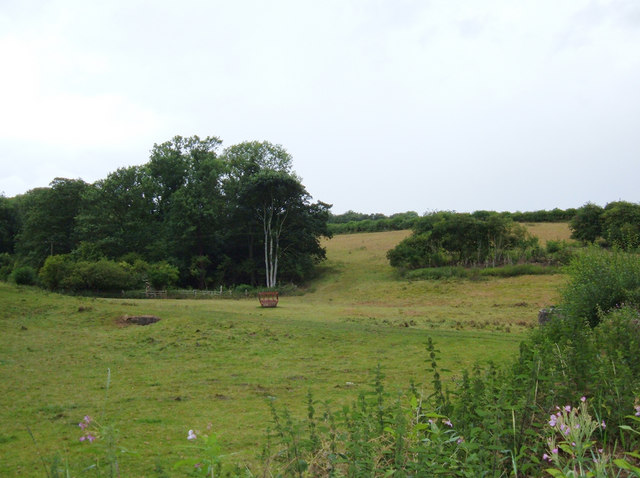
The site of the medieval village of Wothersome

Wothersome is a civil parish in the City of Leeds metropolitan borough, West Yorkshire, England. It is south of Wetherby, north east of Leeds and west of Bramham. It has a population of 40. From the 2011 Census the village is shown as being in the Harewood ward of Leeds Metropolitan Council.

In 1848 it was described as having 3 farms totalling 600 acres (2.4 km^{2}) and a population of 19 people. It was a township in Bardsey parish in the Skyrack wapentake, lower division, in the West Riding of Yorkshire.

In 1871 the population of Wothersome was 24; in 1901 it was 28; it 1971 it was 26.

The name Wothersome derives from the plural form of wuduhús meaning 'wood house'.

In 1418, the medieval spelling, or, at least, the pronunciation, may have been Wodusom.

== Wothersome Grange ==
Bramham Park estate lies to the south of Wothersome. The Wothersome Grange anaerobic digestion plant became operational in September 2015, using maize, grass and whole-crop wheat silage grown on the Estate's home farm, to produce methane gas. The methane fuels an electricity generator to export electricity to the National Grid, while the waste heat from the generator is used to dry wood-chip for biomass boilers.

== Wothersome Lake ==
Wothersome Lake lies just off Thorner Road. A new permissive path was opened by the Bramham Park Estate in 2013, linking existing public rights of way to the lake and to the village of Bramham.
