= East Keswick =

Coordinates: 53.89723°N 1.45364°W

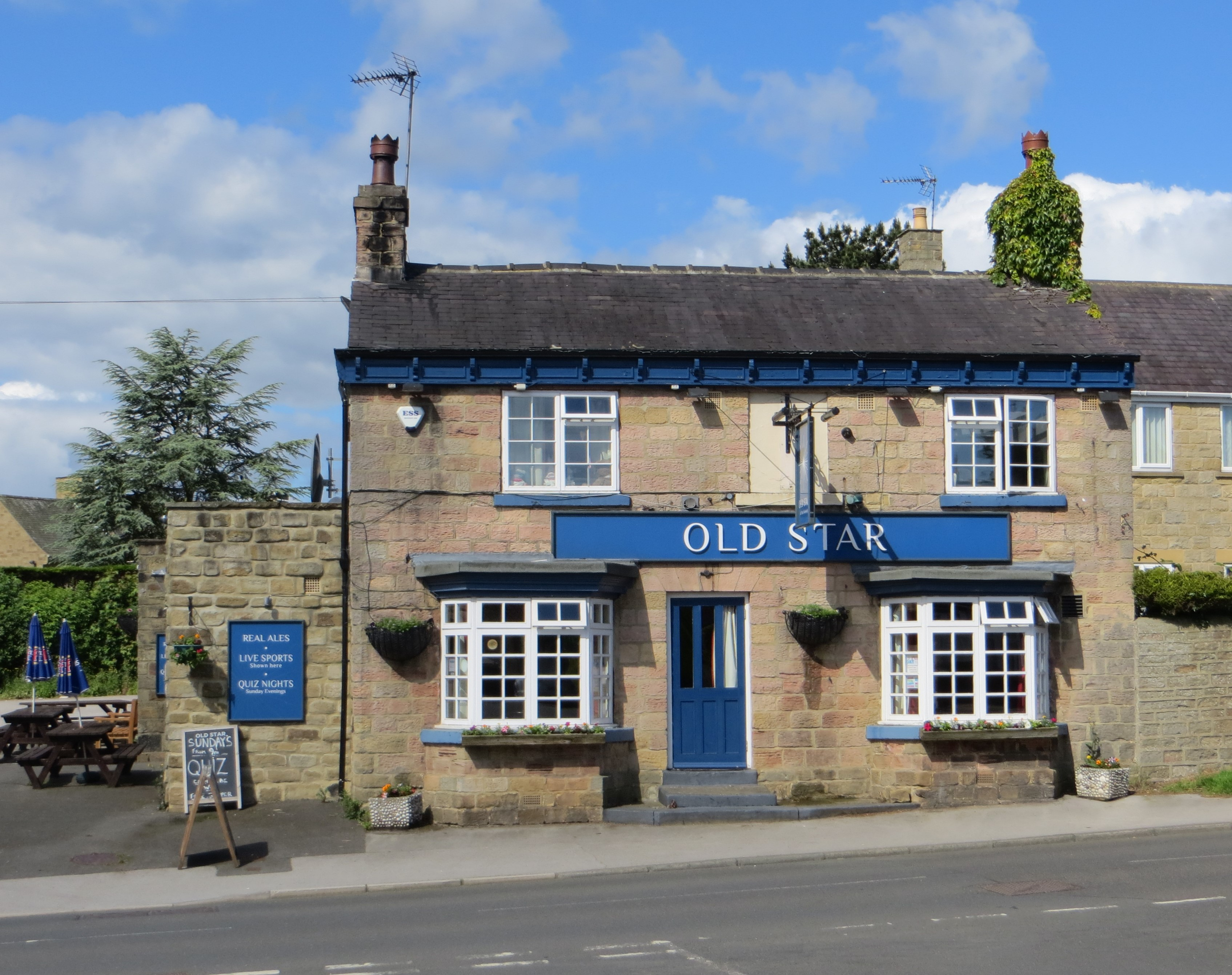
- Old Star pub

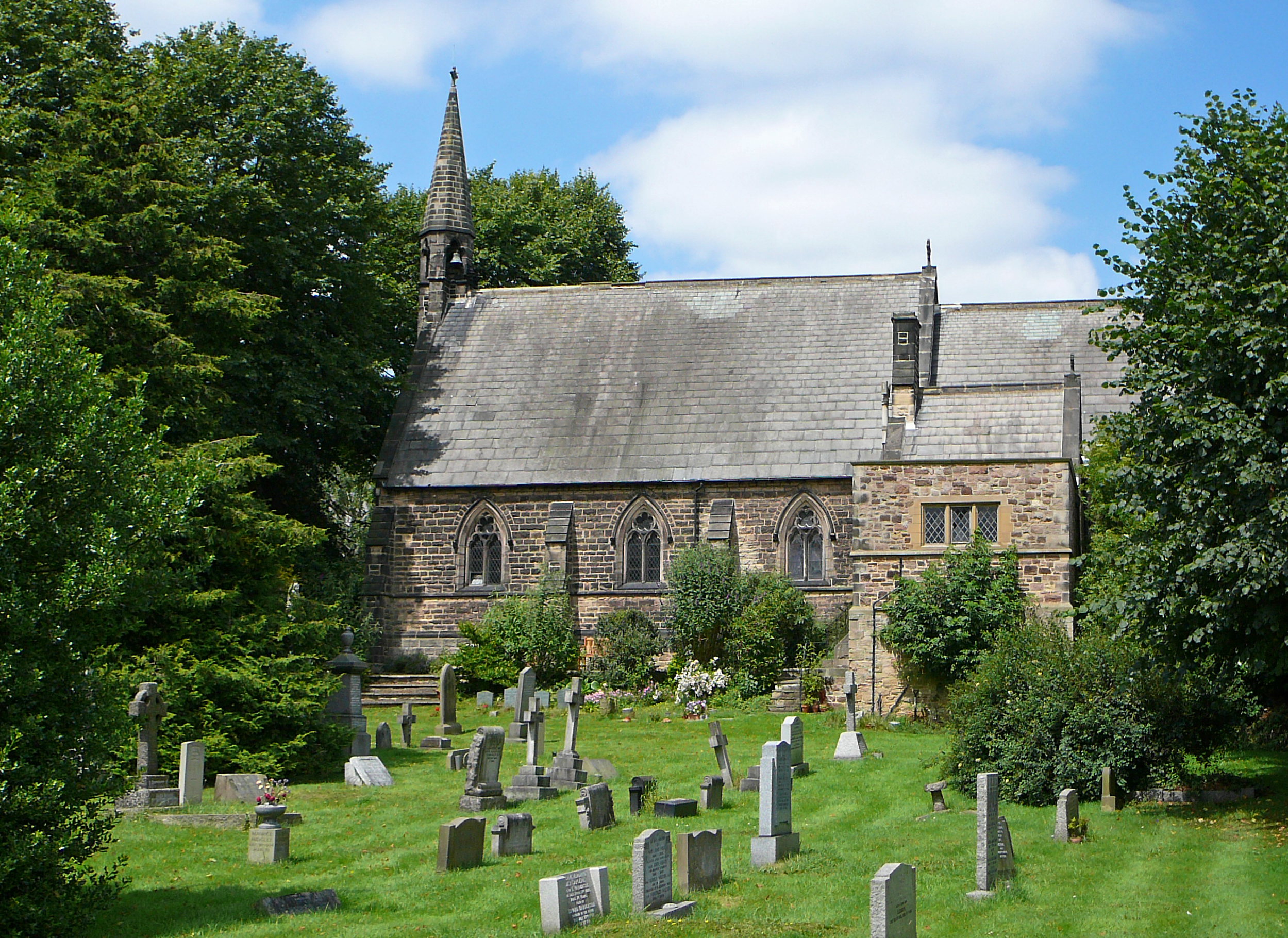
- St Mary Magdalene Church

- Location within West Yorkshire
- Population: 1,146 (2011)
- OS grid reference: SE360447
- Civil parish: East Keswick
- Metropolitan borough: City of Leeds
- Metropolitan county: West Yorkshire
- Region: Yorkshire and the Humber
- Country: England
- Sovereign state: United Kingdom
- Post town: LEEDS
- Postcode district: LS17
- Dialling code: 01937
- Police: West Yorkshire
- Fire: West Yorkshire
- Ambulance: Yorkshire
- UK Parliament: Wetherby and Easingwold

East Keswick is a village and civil parish in the City of Leeds metropolitan borough, West Yorkshire, England. It lies four miles south west of Wetherby. The population of the civil parish as of the 2011 census was 1,146.

== Etymology ==
The name of East Keswick is first attested in the Domesday Book of 1086, in the forms Chesinc and Chesing. This name comes from the Old English words cēse ('cheese') and wīc ('dwelling, specialised farm'), and thus once meant 'farm specialising in cheese production'. The ch- spelling in the Domesday Book reflects the usual Old English pronunciation (also found in modern English cheese). Subsequent attestations, however, reflect the modern pronunciation [k-], the earliest being Keswic and Keswich. This reflects the influence of Old Norse pronunciation on the local language.

The additional element East is first attested in twelfth-century forms such as Estkeswyck. It seems to have been added to distinguish the villages from other places called Keswick, such as the nearby Dunkeswick.

== Amenities ==
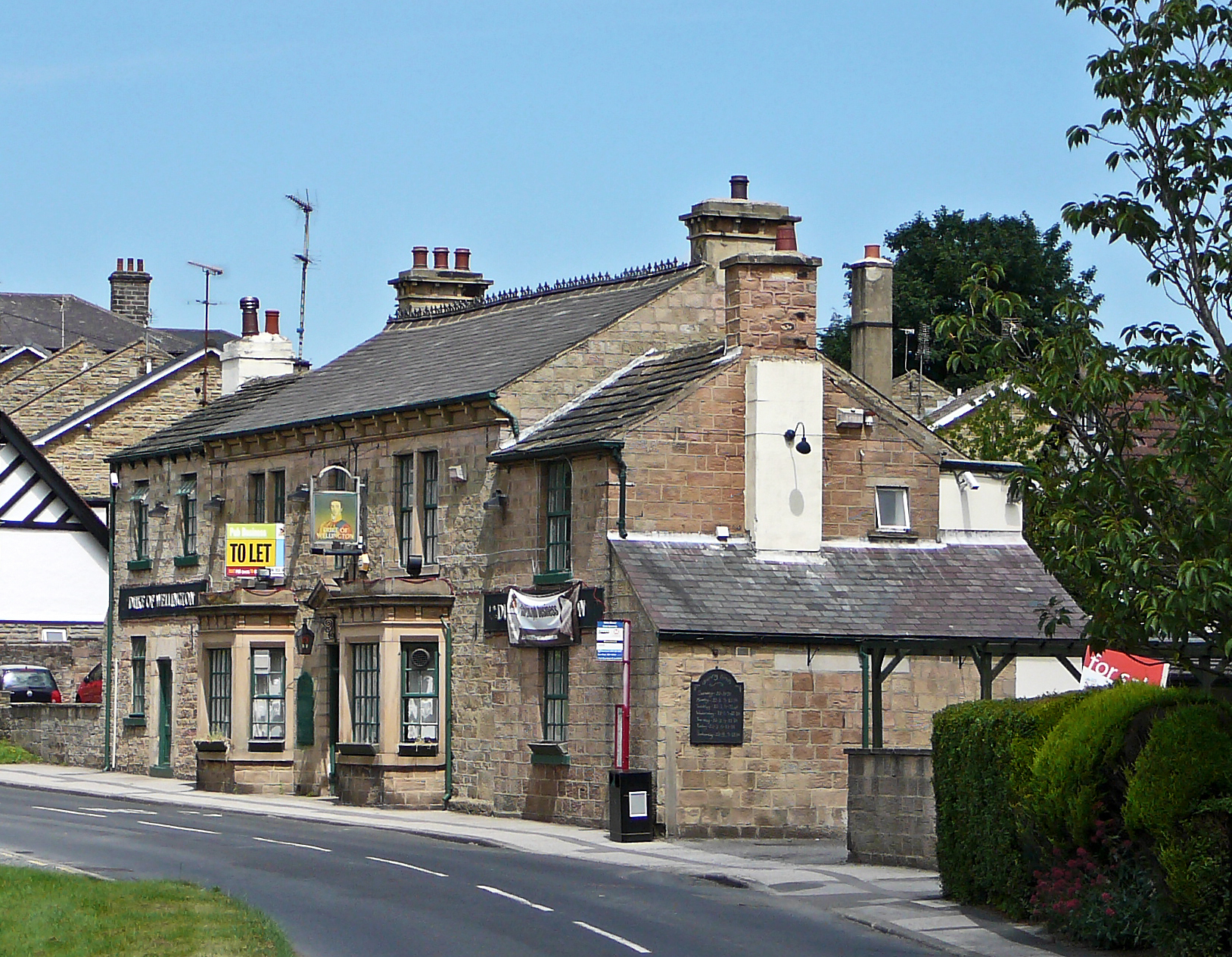
The Duke of Wellington public house

The village has two churches (one Methodist, one Anglican), a butcher, village hall, and two pubs: the Old Star, which is Grade II listed, and the Duke of Wellington. A third pub, the Travellers' Rest, situated just outside the village, closed in the 2000s. After lying derelict for several years, the Traveller's Rest is now a children's nursery. The village had a school, but this closed in 1990, leaving the nearest school in Bardsey. The village's Post Office closed in the mid-2010s.

== Conservation ==
The village is a conservation area surrounded by farmland. Its history has been chronicled in a Millennium Book and unusually it enjoys its own Wildlife Trust which manages large tracts of local land.

== See also ==
- Listed buildings in East Keswick

== Bibliography ==
- (East Keswick Village Design Group) EKVDG (2002). "East Keswick Village Design Statement" (PDF). Leeds City Council.
