= Municipal Borough of Pudsey =

Former local government area in the UK

Coordinates: 53.798522°N 1.670292°W

Pudsey
- Area
  - 1911: 2,399 acres (9.71 km^{2})
  - 1961: 5,323 acres (21.54 km^{2})
- History
  - Origin: Pudsey parish
  - Created: 1894
  - Abolished: 1974
- Status: Local Government District (1872 - 1894); Urban district (1894 - 1900); Municipal borough (after 1900)

Pudsey was a local government district in the West Riding of Yorkshire from 1872 to 1974 established around the town of Pudsey, covering Farsley, Calverley, and parts of Stanningley, Swinnow and Rodley.

A local board formed for the parish of Pudsey in 1872. It became an urban district in 1894 and gained the status of municipal borough in 1900.

In 1937 it absorbed Calverley Urban District (2106 acres) and Farsley Urban District (821 acres).

It was abolished in 1974 and its former area became part of the City of Leeds, a metropolitan borough of West Yorkshire.

== Arms ==
Coat of arms of Municipal Borough of Pudsey
Notes Granted in 1901, based on the arms used by the Pudsey family. Escutcheon Argent, on a chevron Vert, between two pairs of shuttles saltirewise in chief and a woolpack in base Proper, three mullets pierced Or all within a bordure engrailed Gules charged with eight roses of the field. Motto Be Just and Fear Not
