= Scarcroft =

Village and civil parish in West Yorkshire, England

Coordinates: 53°52′00″N 1°27′00″W

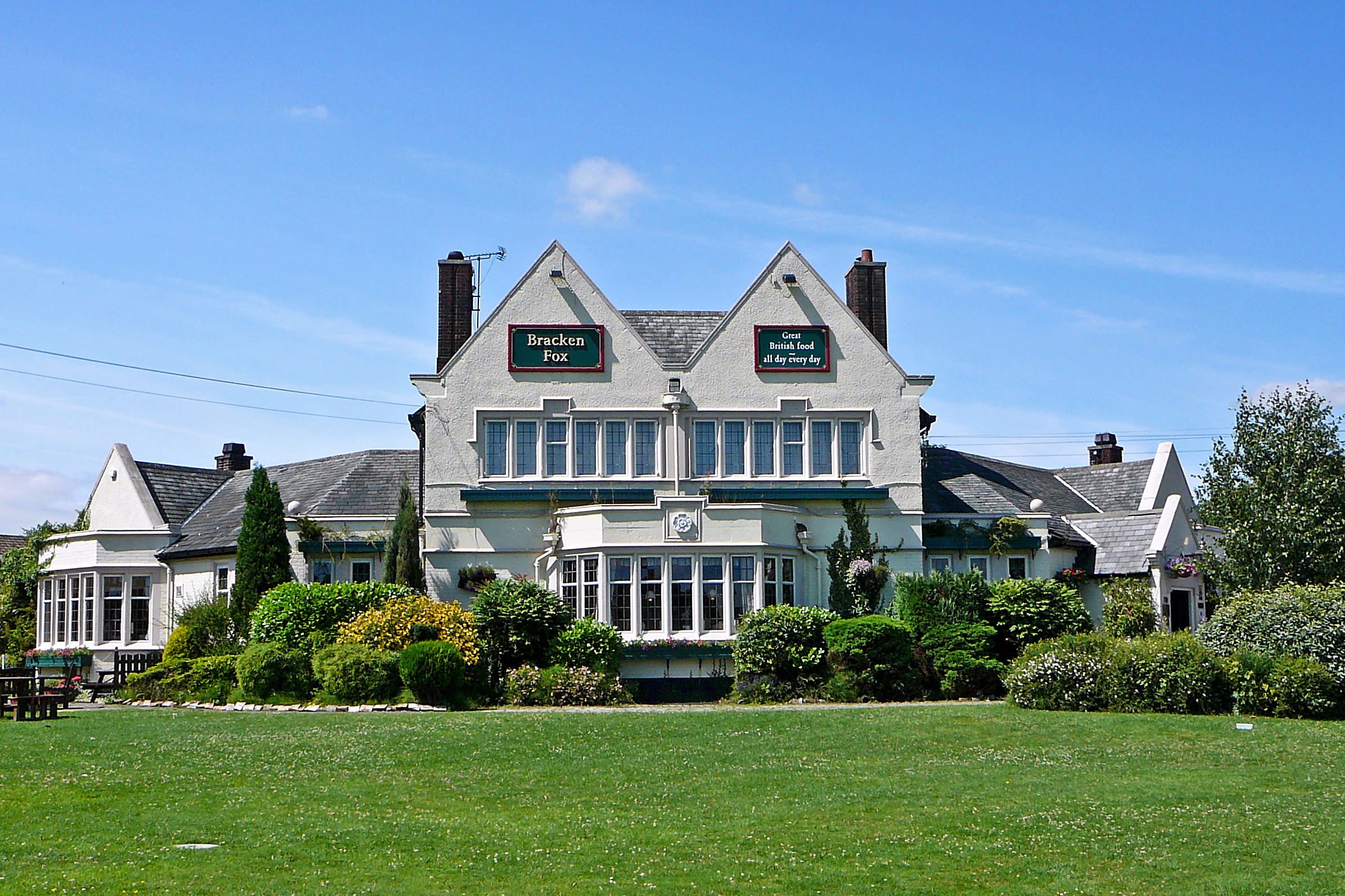
- The New Inn

- Location within West Yorkshire
- Population: 1,194 2011 census
- Civil parish: Scarcroft
- Metropolitan borough: City of Leeds
- Metropolitan county: West Yorkshire
- Region: Yorkshire and the Humber
- Country: England
- Sovereign state: United Kingdom
- Post town: LEEDS
- Postcode district: LS14
- Dialling code: 0113
- Police: West Yorkshire
- Fire: West Yorkshire
- Ambulance: Yorkshire
- UK Parliament: Wetherby and Easingwold

Scarcroft is a village and civil parish 6 miles (10 km) north east of Leeds city centre in the City of Leeds metropolitan borough, West Yorkshire, England. The village lies on the main A58 road between Leeds and Wetherby. It had a population of 1,153 increasing to 1,194 at the 2011 Census.

The village of Bardsey is further 1 mile (2 km) eastwards on the A58 towards Wetherby.

The name Scarcroft derives from the Old English sceardcroft meaning 'croft in a gap'.

The Scarcroft Watermill was built in 1810 to grind corn.

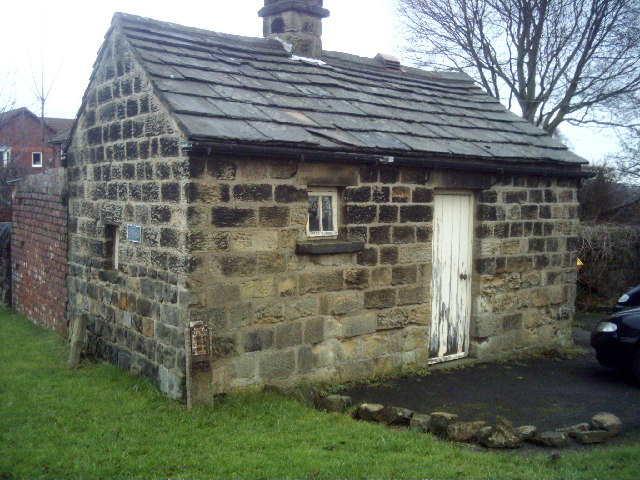
Toll Bar House, this was used between 1826 and 1876 when a toll system was in place between Wetherby and Leeds.

There is one pub in Scarcroft, the New Inn, established in 1852. It was at one time called The Bracken Fox but reverted to its former name in 2011. The village's shop and post office have closed. The closest local shops are in Bardsey, Shadwell and Whinmoor. The closest supermarkets are Tesco in Seacroft and Morrisons in Wetherby.

Scarcroft is also renowned for having among the most expensive streets in Leeds: Bracken Park, recently revealed as the most expensive and Ling Lane, regularly appearing in top ten lists.

== See also ==
- Listed buildings in Scarcroft
