= Municipal Borough of Morley =

Former local government area of Leeds, West Yorkshire, England

Coordinates: 53.758°N 1.610°W

Morley was a local government district in the West Riding of Yorkshire.

Apart from the town of Morley, it included Churwell (a separate Local Government District until 1891), East Ardsley (or Ardsley East), West Ardsley, Drighlington and Gildersome (urban districts absorbed in 1937).

Morley was incorporated as a borough in 1885.

It was abolished in 1974, and its former area became part of the City of Leeds, a metropolitan borough of West Yorkshire.
