= City of Leeds =

Metropolitan District in West Yorkshire, England

Leeds
- City and metropolitan borough
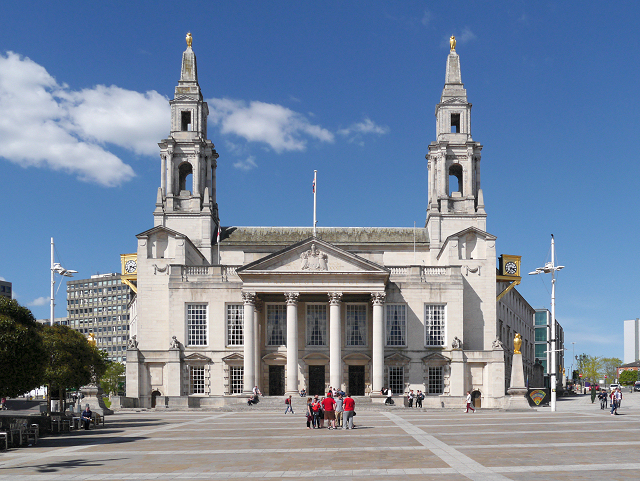
- Leeds Civic Hall, the headquarters of Leeds City Council

- Coat of arms
- Motto: Latin: Pro Rege et Lege, lit. 'For King and the Law'
- Leeds shown within West Yorkshire

- Location within England Location within the United Kingdom Location in Europe
- Coordinates: 53.8007°N 1.5502°W
- OS grid reference: SE 2971 3391
- Sovereign state: United Kingdom
- Country: England
- Region: Yorkshire and the Humber
- Combined authority and metropolitan county: West Yorkshire
- Historic county: West Riding of Yorkshire, Yorkshire
- Borough Charter: 1207
- Town charter: 1626
- City status: 1893
- Metropolitan borough: 1974
- Named for: Leeds
- Administrative HQ: Leeds Civic Hall

Government
  - Type: Metropolitan borough with leader and cabinet
  - Body: Leeds City Council
  - Control: No overall control
  - Leader: James Lewis (L)
  - Lord Mayor: Stephen Holroyd
  - Chief Executive: Ed Whiting
  - House of Commons: 10 MPs: Hilary Benn (L); Richard Burgon (L); Fabian Hamilton (L); Simon Lightwood (L); Keir Mather (L); Rachel Reeves (L); Mark Sewards (L); Alec Shelbrooke (C); Alex Sobel (L); Katie White (L)

Area
  - Total: 213 sq mi (552 km^{2})
  - Rank: 71st

Population (2025)
  - Total: 840,550
  - Rank: 2nd
  - Density: 3,950/sq mi (1,524/km^{2})

Ethnicity (2021)
  - Ethnic groups: List: 79.0% White; 9.7% Asian; 5.6% Black; 3.4% Mixed; 2.3% other

Religion (2021)
  - Religion: List: 42.3% Christianity; 40.2% no religion; 7.8% Islam; 1.2% Sikhism; 1.1% Hinduism; 0.8% Judaism; 0.4% Buddhism; 0.4% other; 5.8% not stated
- Time zone: UTC+0 (GMT)
  - Summer (DST): UTC+1 (BST)
- Postcode areas: BD; LS; WF
- Dialling codes: 0113; 01924; 01937; 01943; 01977
- ISO 3166 code: GB-LDS
- GSS code: E08000035
- ITL code: TLE42
- GVA: 2021 estimate
  - Total: £27.9 billion
  - Per capita: £34,487
- GDP (nominal): 2021 estimate
  - Total: £30.6 billion
  - Per capita: £37,764
- Website: leeds.gov.uk

The City of Leeds, also known officially as Leeds, is a metropolitan borough with city status in West Yorkshire, England. It occupies the north east of the county and includes Leeds and its surrounding towns, including Wetherby, Garforth, Rothwell, Morley, and Otley. The borough had an estimated population of 840,550 in 2025, making it the second largest district in England by population after Birmingham.

The borough was created in 1974 as part of a reform of local government in England. It is one of five metropolitan boroughs within the metropolitan county of West Yorkshire, which was created at the same time. Local government was shared between Leeds City Council and West Yorkshire County Council until 1985, when the county council was abolished and the city council took on its responsibilities. The city council is a member of the West Yorkshire Combined Authority, a strategic body for the county.

== History ==
=== Background ===
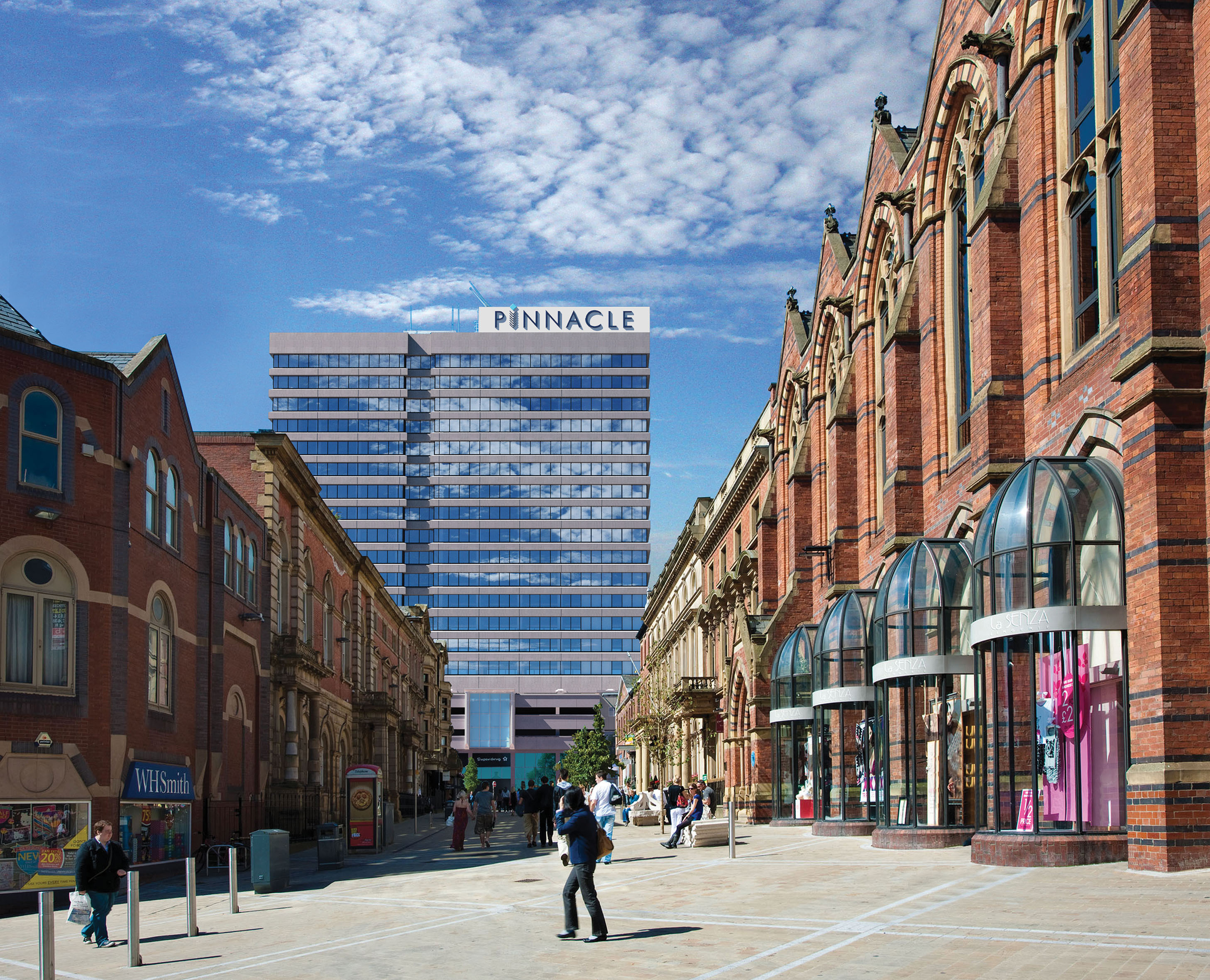
Albion Place

The Borough of Leeds was created in 1207, when Maurice Paynel, lord of the manor, granted a charter covering a small area adjacent to a crossing of the River Aire, between the old settlement centred on Leeds Parish Church to the east and the manor house and mills to the west. In 1626 a charter was granted by Charles I, incorporating the entire parish as the Borough of Leeds; it was reformed by the Municipal Corporations Act 1835. The parish and borough included the chapelries of Chapel Allerton, Armley, Beeston, Bramley, Farnley, Headingley cum Burley, Holbeck, Hunslet, Leeds, Potternewton and Wortley. The borough was located in the West Riding of Yorkshire and gained city status in 1893. When a county council was formed for the riding in 1889, Leeds was excluded from its area of responsibility and formed a county borough. The borough made a significant number of territorial expansions, expanding from 21,593 acres (87.38 km^{2}) in 1911 to 40,612 acres (164.35 km^{2}) in 1961; adding in stages the former area of the Roundhay, Seacroft, Shadwell and Middleton parishes and gaining other parts of adjacent districts.

=== Formation ===
A review of local government arrangements completed in 1969 proposed the creation of a new large district centred on Leeds, occupying 317,000 acres (1,280 km^{2}) and including 840,000 people. The proposed area was significantly reduced in a 1971 white paper; and within a year every local authority to be incorporated into it protested or demonstrated. The final proposal reduced the area further and following the enactment of the Local Government Act 1972, the county borough was abolished on 1 April 1974 and its former area was combined with that of the municipal boroughs of Morley and Pudsey; the urban districts of Aireborough, Horsforth, Otley, Garforth and Rothwell; and parts of the rural districts of Tadcaster, Wetherby and Wharfedale. The new district gained both borough and city status, as had been held by the county borough; and forms part of the county of West Yorkshire.

Formation of the metropolitan district in 1974
The former county borough is shaded in grey. Other areas: 1. Municipal Borough of Morley; 2. Municipal Borough of Pudsey; 3. Aireborough Urban District; 4. Horsforth Urban District; 5. Otley Urban District; 6. Garforth Urban District; 7. Rothwell Urban District; 8. 8a. Tadcaster Rural District (part); 9. Wetherby Rural District (part); 10. Wharfedale Rural District (part)

== Geography ==
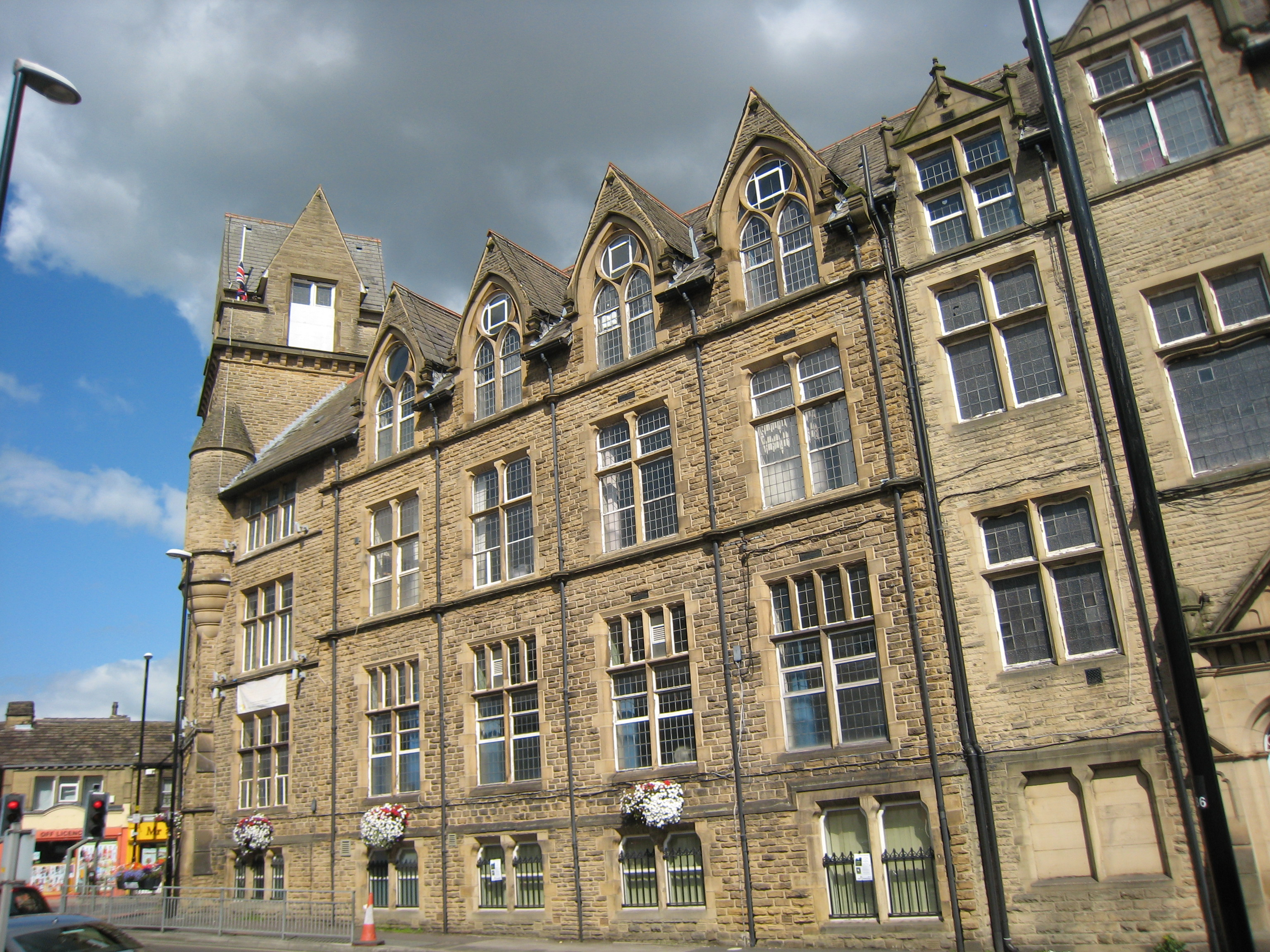
Pudsey, which is one of the boroughs towns also forms part of the conurbation of nearby Bradford

The district and its settlements are situated in the eastern foothills of the Pennines astride the River Aire whose valley, the Aire Gap, provides a road and rail corridor that facilitates communications with cities to the west of the Pennines. The district extends 15 miles (24 km) from east to west and 13 miles (21 km) from north to south; with over 65% covered with green belt land. The highest point, at 1,115 feet (340 m), is at its north western extremity on the eastern slopes of Rombalds Moor, better known as Ilkley Moor, on the boundary with the City of Bradford. The lowest points are at around 33 feet (10 m), in the east: where River Wharfe crosses the boundary with North Yorkshire south of Thorp Arch Trading Estate and where the River Aire (at this point forming the City of Wakefield boundary) meets the North Yorkshire boundary near Fairburn Ings. To the north and east Leeds is bordered by the North Yorkshire districts of Harrogate to the north and Selby district to the east. The remaining borders are with other districts of West Yorkshire: Wakefield to the south, Kirklees to the south-west, and Bradford to the west.

== Governance ==
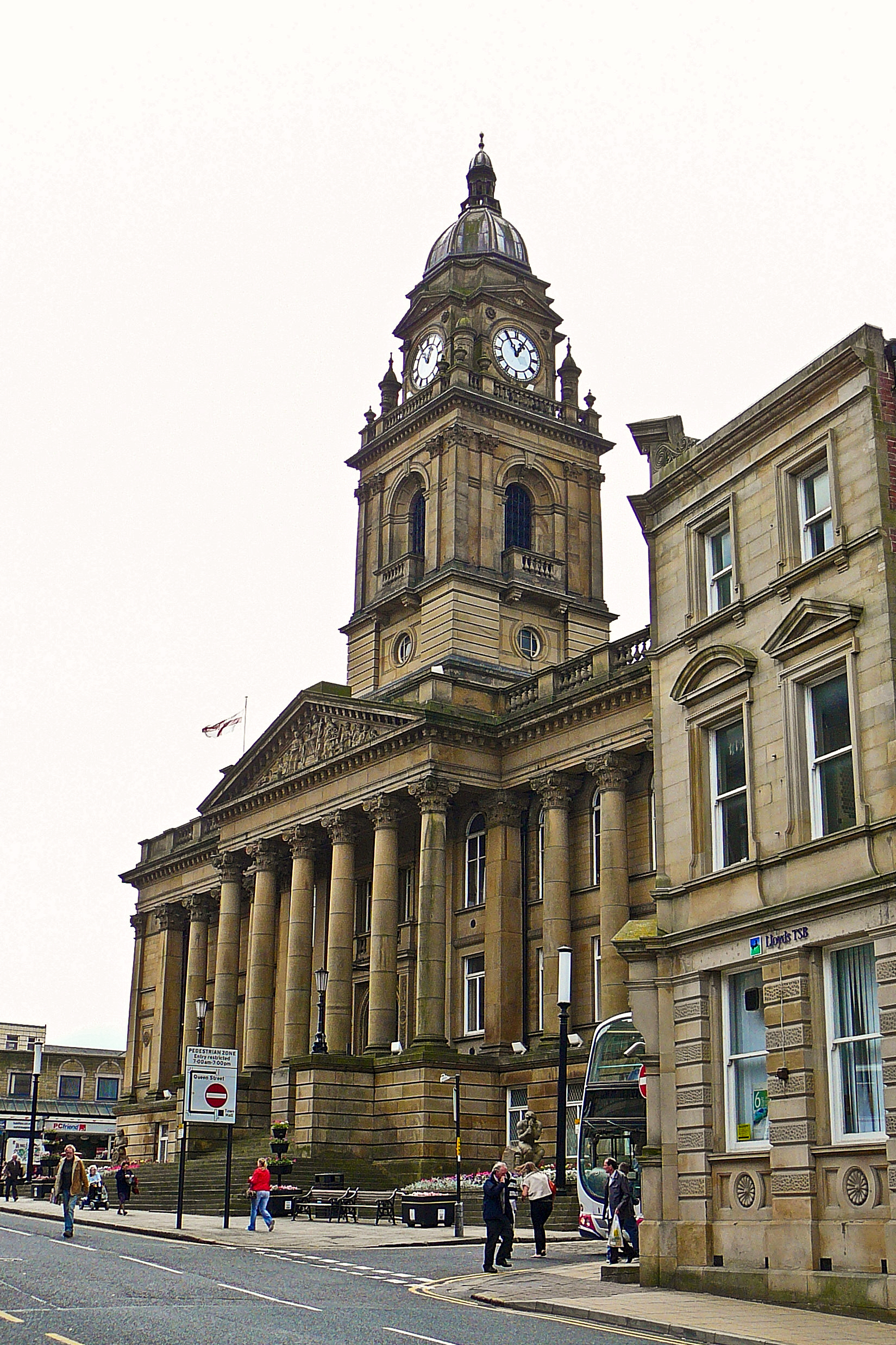
Morley town hall, one of the towns forming the borough

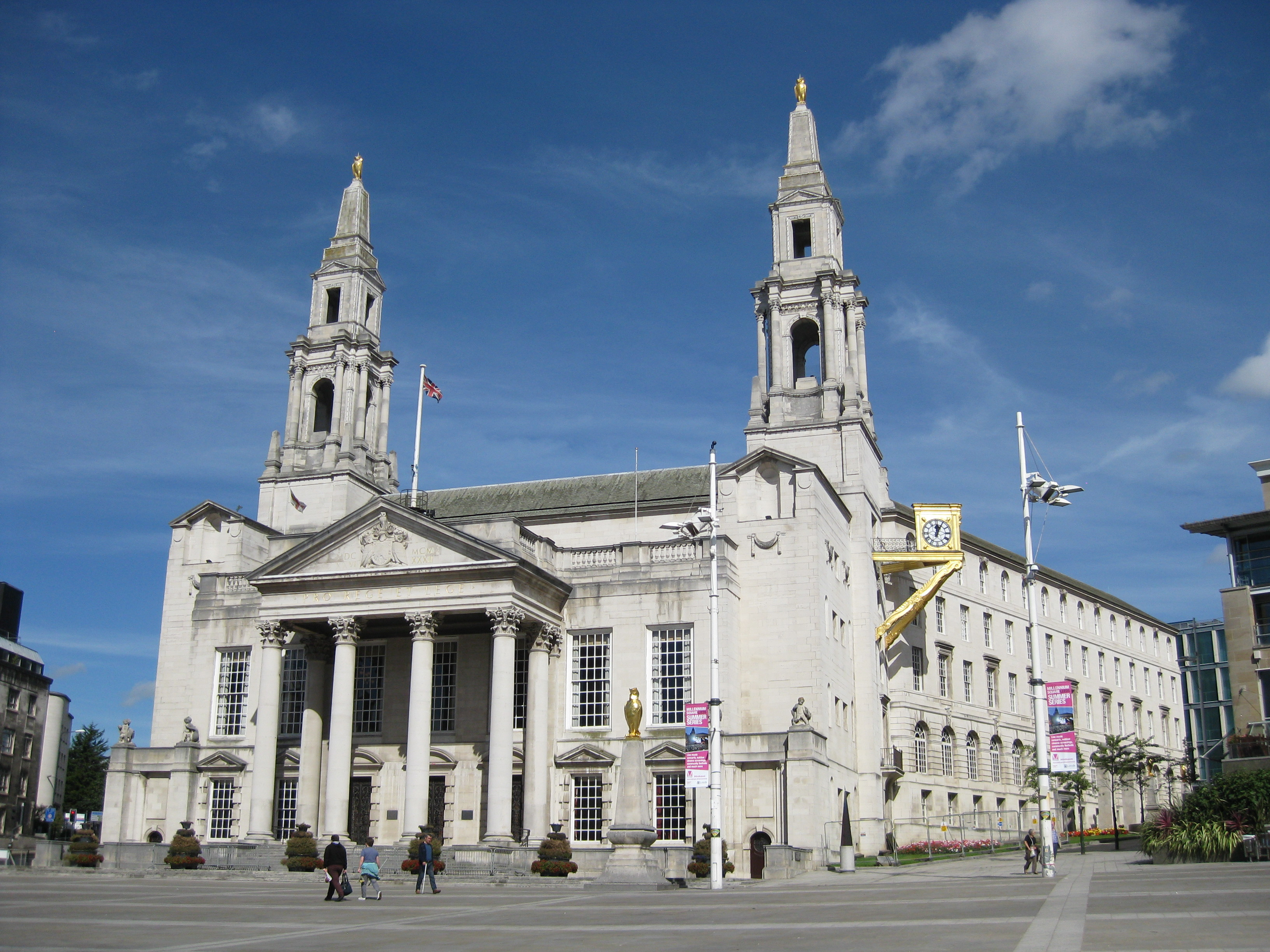
Leeds Civic Hall on Millennium Square, meeting place of Leeds City Council

Leeds City Council is the local authority of the district. The council is composed of 99 councillors, three for each of the city's 33 wards. Elections are held three years out of four on the first Thursday in May, with one third of the councillors elected, for a four-year term, at each election. The council is currently under no overall control, the 2026 elections having ended a 15-year Labour administration. The Chief Executive of Leeds City Council is Ed Whiting; the Leader of the Council is Councillor James Lewis of the Labour Party. Leeds is one of the councils contributing to the West Yorkshire Combined Authority.

As a metropolitan county, West Yorkshire does not have a county council, so Leeds City Council is the primary provider of local government services. The district forms part of the Yorkshire and the Humber region of England.

Most of the district is an unparished area, comprising Leeds itself (the area of the former county borough), Pudsey, Garforth, Rothwell and the area of the former urban district of Aireborough. In the unparished area there is no lower tier of government. Outside the unparished area there are 31 civil parishes, represented by parish councils. These form the lowest tier of local government and absorb some limited functions from Leeds City Council in their areas. The councils of the civil parishes of Horsforth, Morley, Otley and Wetherby are town councils. The 34 other civil parishes are:

- Aberford
- Allerton Bywater
- Alwoodley
- Arthington
- Austhorpe
- Bardsey cum Rigton
- Barwick in Elmet and Scholes
- Boston Spa
- Bramham cum Oglethorpe
- Bramhope
- Carlton
- Clifford
- Collingham
- Drighlington
- East Keswick
- Gildersome
- Great and Little Preston
- Harewood
- Kippax
- Ledsham
- Ledston
- Lotherton cum Aberford
- Micklefield
- Parlington
- Pool
- Rawdon
- Scarcroft
- Shadwell
- Sturton Grange
- Swillington
- Thorner
- Thorp Arch
- Walton
- Wothersome

The district is represented by ten MPs, for the constituencies of Leeds Central and Headingley (Alex Sobel, Labour); Leeds East (Richard Burgon, Labour); Leeds North East (Fabian Hamilton, Labour); Leeds North West (Katie White, Labour); Leeds South (Hilary Benn, Labour); Leeds South West and Morley (Mark Sewards, Labour); Leeds West and Pudsey (Rachel Reeves, Labour); Selby (constituency shared with North Yorkshire) (Keir Mather, Labour); Wakefield and Rothwell (constituency shared with City of Wakefield) (Simon Lightwood, Labour); and Wetherby and Easingwold (constituency shared with North Yorkshire) (Alec Shelbrooke, Conservative).

== Demography ==
Leeds and inclusive areas
2021 UK Census	City of Leeds metropolitan district	Yorkshire and the Humber	England
Population	812,000	5,480,800	56,536,000
White	79%	85%	81.7%
Asian	8.9%	9.1%	9.3%
Black	5.6%	2.2%	4%

Historical population
Year	Pop.	±%
1801	94,421	—
1811	108,459	+14.9%
1821	137,476	+26.8%
1831	183,015	+33.1%
1841	222,189	+21.4%
1851	249,992	+12.5%
1861	311,197	+24.5%
1871	372,402	+19.7%
1881	433,607	+16.4%
1891	503,493	+16.1%
1901	552,479	+9.7%
1911	606,250	+9.7%
1921	625,854	+3.2%
1931	646,119	+3.2%
1941	668,667	+3.5%
1951	692,003	+3.5%
1961	715,260	+3.4%
1971	739,401	+3.4%
1981	696,732	−5.8%
1991	716,760	+2.9%
2001	715,404	−0.2%
2021	812,000	+13.5%
Source: Vision of Britain "2021 Census"

At the 2001 UK census, the district had a total population of 715,402. Of the 301,614 households in Leeds, 33.3% were married couples living together, 31.6% were one-person households, 9.0% were co-habiting couples and 9.8% were lone parents, following a similar trend to the rest of England. The population density was 1,967/km^{2} (5,090/sq mi) and for every 100 females, there were 93.5 males. Of those aged 16–74, 30.9% had no academic qualifications, higher than the 28.9% in all of England. Of the residents, 6.6% were born outside the United Kingdom, lower than the England average of 9.2%.

At the 2021 Census the population of Leeds had grown substantially to 812,000 with population growth compared with 2011 at 8%, 1.4 points faster when compared with the rest of England.

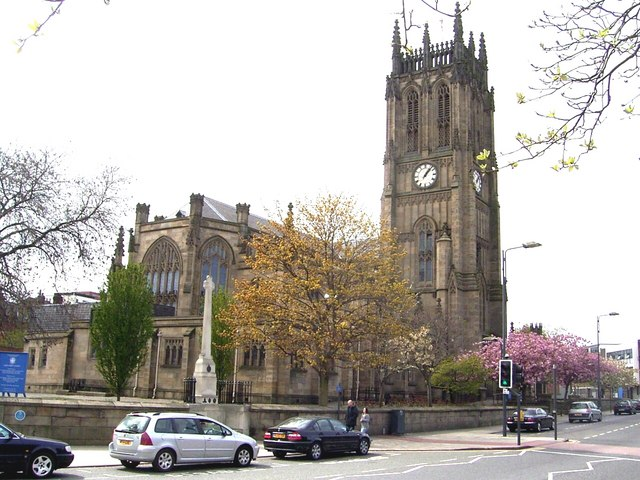
Leeds Minster

The majority of people in Leeds identify themselves as Christian. The proportion of Muslims is around National average. Leeds has the third-largest Jewish community in the United Kingdom, after those of London and Manchester. The areas of Alwoodley and Moortown contain sizeable Jewish populations. 16.8% of Leeds residents in the 2001 census declared themselves as having "no religion", which is broadly in line with the figure for the whole of the UK (also 8.1% "religion not stated").

The crime rate in Leeds is well above the national average, like many other cities in England. In July 2006, the think tank Reform calculated rates of crime for different offences and has related this to populations of major urban areas (defined as towns over 100,000 population). Leeds was 11th in this rating (excluding London boroughs, 23rd including London boroughs).

== Economy ==
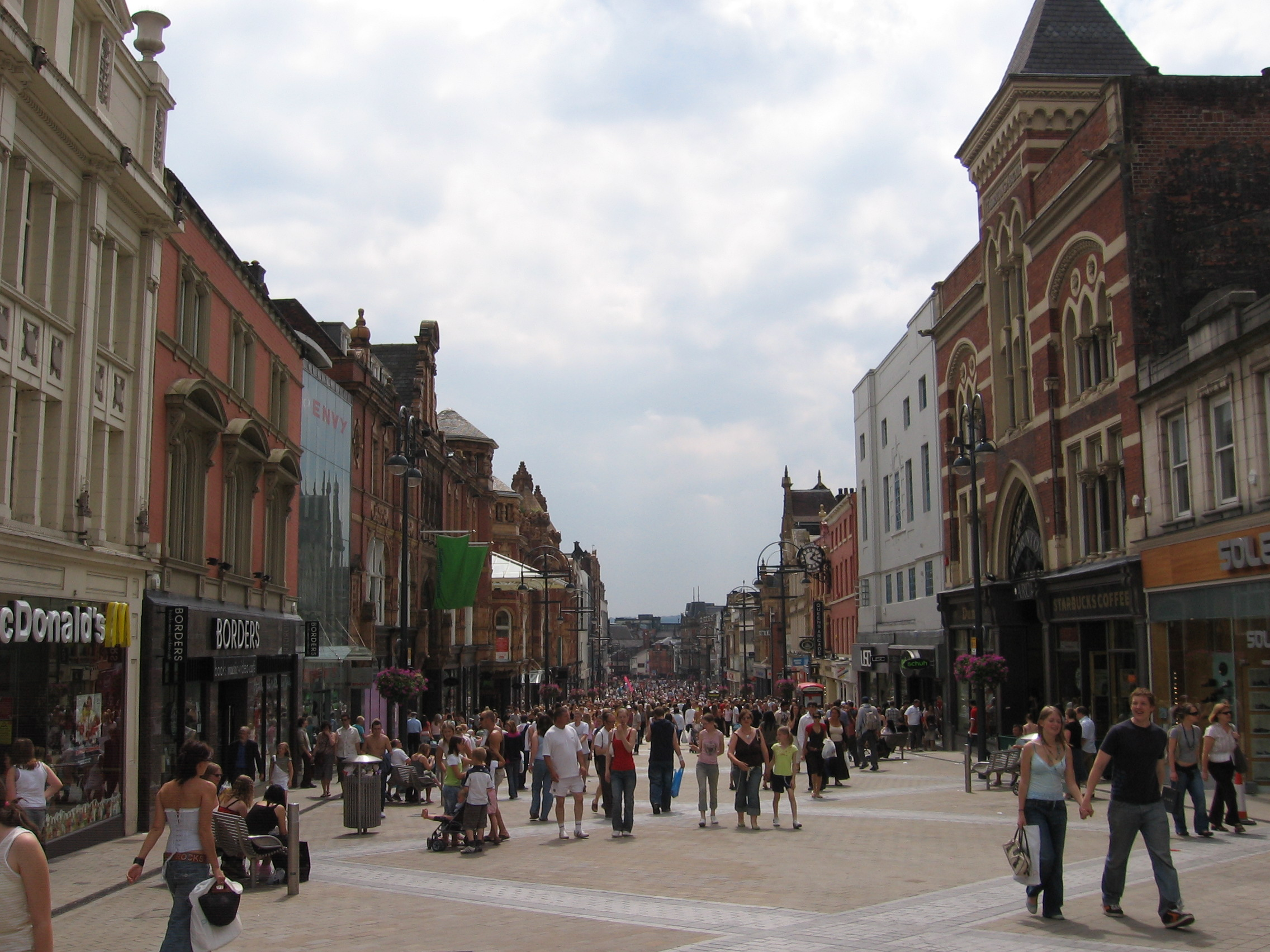
Leeds City Centre

Leeds has a diverse economy with the service sector now dominating over the traditional manufacturing industries. It is the location of one of the largest financial centres in England outside London. New tertiary industries such as retail, call centres, offices and media have contributed to a high rate of economic growth. This is a chart of trend of regional gross value added of Leeds at current basic prices with figures in millions of pounds.

Year	Regional Gross Value Added^{4}	Agriculture^{1}	Industry^{2}	Services^{3}
1995	8,713	43	2,652	6,018
2000	11,681	32	2,771	8,878
2003	13,637	36	3,018	10,583

== Education ==
Education Leeds, a non-profit company owned by Leeds City Council, provided educational services between 2001 and 2011. In April 2011 Leeds City Council disbanded Education Leeds and has consolidated educational services into the Children's Services Department of the council itself.

== Culture ==
Leeds has a diverse cultural offer, including art, music, dance, architecture, film and television.

Amongst its cultural offer, the city counts a variety of museums and galleries, live music and events venues, independent arts organisations, and city-wide festivals.

== Media ==
=== Television ===
The area has regional studios and broadcasting centres which broadcast from Leeds:

- BBC Yorkshire broadcasts from its studios on Peter's Square.
- ITV Yorkshire formerly Yorkshire Television broadcasts from the Leeds Studios on Kirkstall Road.

Leeds TV also broadcast to the area which is required to broadcast 37 hours a week of first-run local programming. .

=== Radio ===
The area has several radio stations:

BBC Local Radio

- BBC Radio Leeds

Independent Local Radio

- Heart Yorkshire
- Capital Yorkshire
- Hits Radio West Yorkshire
- Greatest Hits Radio West Yorkshire

Community Radio

- LDC Radio
- Tempo FM (serving Wetherby and Boston Spa)
- Drystone Radio (covering Wharfedale)
- Rhubarb Radio (covering south of Leeds)
- Radio Asian Fever (for the Asian community in Leeds)

=== Newspapers ===
Local newspapers for the area:

- The Yorkshire Post
- Yorkshire Evening Post
- Wetherby News
- Gazette & Observer

== Transport ==
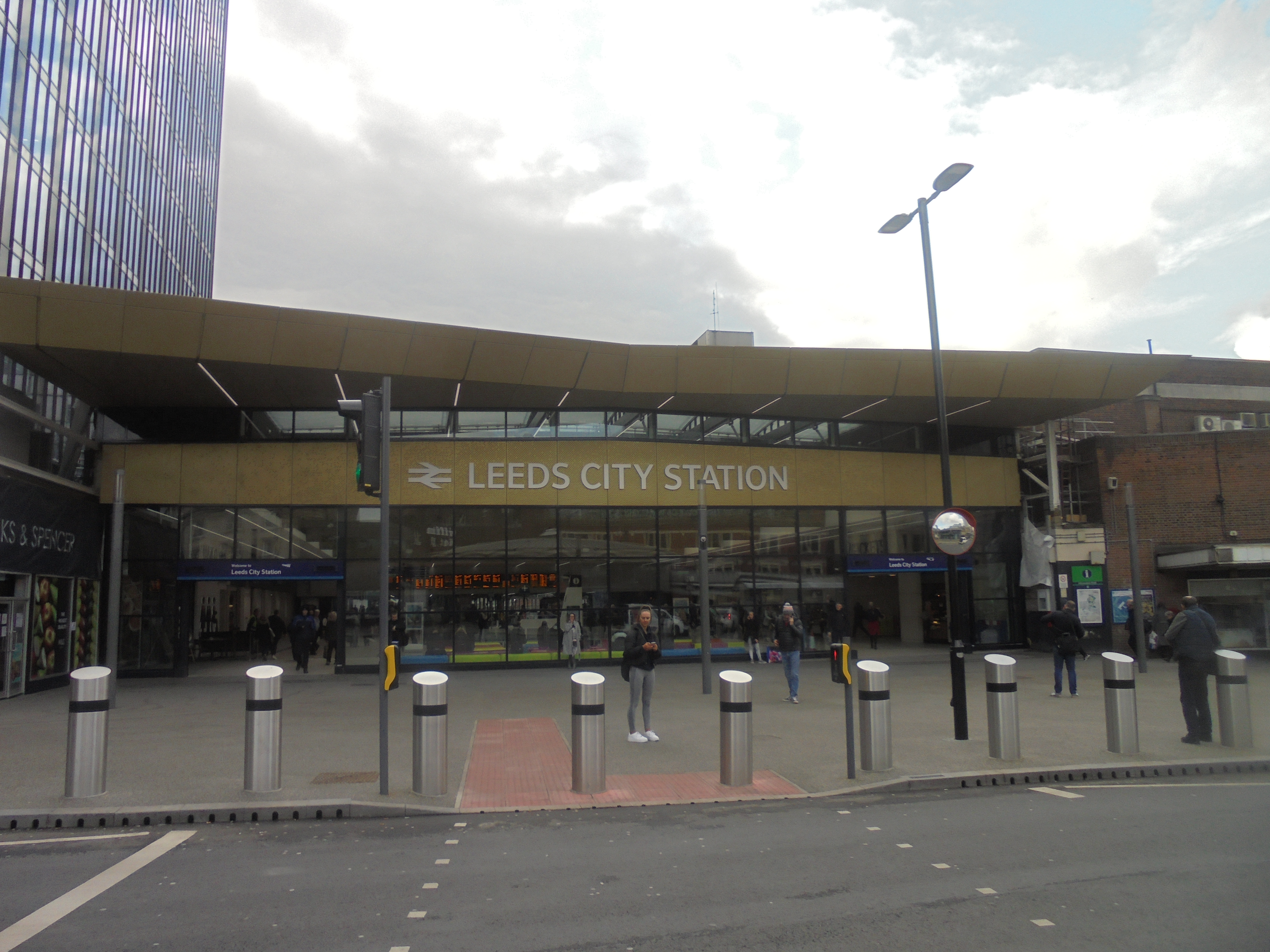
Leeds railway station, the city's busiest station

Leeds city centre is connected to the National Rail network at Leeds railway station. Public transport in West Yorkshire is coordinated by West Yorkshire Metro, under the control of a joint-board of local authorities in the county, including Leeds City Council.

== Public services ==
There are 24 cemeteries in Leeds operated by the city council. The oldest ones, in Beckett Street and Hunslet, were both opened in 1845; the newest ones, in Kippax and Whinmoor, opened in 2013.

== Twin cities ==
The City has several twinning or partnership arrangements

- Brno, Czech Republic
- Dortmund, Germany
- Durban, South Africa
- Hangzhou, China
- Lille, France
- Siegen, Germany
- Kharkiv, Ukraine

=== Former Partnerships ===
- Louisville, United States

== Notes ==
- ^1 includes hunting and forestry
- ^2 includes energy and construction
- ^3 includes financial intermediation services indirectly measured
- ^4 Components may not sum to totals due to rounding
