= Listed buildings in Holme Valley (central area) =

Holme Valley is a civil parish in the metropolitan borough of Kirklees, West Yorkshire, England. It contains 450 listed buildings that are recorded in the National Heritage List for England. Of these, one is listed at Grade II*, the middle of the three grades, and the others are at Grade II, the lowest grade. Holme Valley is a large parish to the south of Huddersfield, and is largely rural. The largest settlement is the small town of Holmfirth, and smaller settlements include Honley and Brockholes to the north, and New Mill, Totties, Jackson Bridge, Hepworth, Hade Edge and Burnlee to the east and south.

Until the Industrial Revolution the economy of the parish depended mainly on agriculture, and many of the listed buildings are farmhouses and farm buildings. The Industrial Revolution brought the woollen industry to the area, and this was initially a domestic process. A high proportion of the listed buildings are weavers' cottages and other houses used for spinning wool, and these are characterised by long rows of mullioned windows, mainly in the upper storeys, and containing as many as 14 lights. Most of the listed buildings are constructed from stone, in particular millstone grit, and have roofs of stone slate. The other listed buildings include churches, chapels and associated structures, items in churchyards, schools, public houses, shops, bridges over the River Holme and its tributaries, a pinfold, monuments, including a war memorial, milestones and mileposts, boundary markers, a civic hall, remaining parts of corn and woollen mills, a pair of wells and a pair of stone troughs, a cinema, and telephone kiosks.

This list contains the listed buildings in and near the town of Holmfirth, and includes the areas of Burnlee, Cliff, Hinchcliffe Mill, Holmbridge, Netherthong, Thongsbridge, Underbank, Upper Bridge, Upperthong, and Wooldale. The listed buildings in the other parts of the parish are included in Listed buildings in Holme Valley (outer areas).

== Key ==
Grade	Criteria
II*	Particularly important buildings of more than special interest
II	Buildings of national importance and special interest

== Buildings ==
Name and location	Photograph	Date	Notes	Grade
Curlew, Holly and Hawthorn Cottages; 53.56083°N 1.81426°W	—	17th century	A group of cottages that were rebuilt in the 19th century, they are in millstone grit, partly rendered, with quoins, and a stone slate roof with a finial. There are two storeys and a single-storey lean-to extension. The windows are a mix of single lights and mullioned windows. The original doorway has a chamfered surround and a deep lintel with a Tudor arch, and inscribed with initials and a date. Elsewhere there is a doorway with a chamfered and quoined surround and a deep lintel with a Tudor arch.	II
Lip Hill Farmhouse and adjoining dwelling 53.57067°N 1.81848°W	—	1690	A pair of houses with separate roofs at right angles to each other. They are in stone, partly rendered, with quoins, and stone slate roofs with chamfered gable copings and kneelers. Both houses have two storeys, and the windows are mullioned, with some mullions removed; those in the building to the north have hood moulds. The farmhouse to the south has a doorway with a chamfered surround and a partly arched head with initials and the date, and at the rear is a partly blocked doorway with a Tudor arched head.	II
46 and 48 Wooldale Road, Wooldale; 53.57684°N 1.77149°W	—	1691	A house at the end of a row, it is in millstone grit with quoins, a stone slate roof, and two storeys. The doorway has a chamfered surround and an arched lintel with an applied dated plaque. Most of the windows are double chamfered with mullions, there are some single lights, and in the gable are four blocked vents with false arches.	II
Lydgate Unitarian Chapel; 53.57874°N 1.76079°W	—	1695	The chapel, which was remodelled in 1768, is in stone with quoins, and a slate roof with coped gables and carved kneelers. In the entrance front is a round-arched doorway with impost blocks and a keystone. To each side is a small window, and above it is a round-arched window. At the top is a gable and a cupola with a ball finial. Along the sides are three round-arched windows, and at the rear are two Venetian windows.	II
43 Wooldale Road, Wooldale; 53.57678°N 1.77111°W	—	1698	A stone house, later altered and divided, it has quoins, and a chamfered coped gable with kneelers inscribed with a scroll pattern. There are two storeys and a continuous rear outshut. On the left is a blocked doorway with an inserted window and a deep shaped lintel with initials and the date. To the right are an inserted window, two later doorways, and a three-light mullioned window. The upper floor contains two modern inserted windows and another three-light mullioned window.	II
55 and 57 Wooldale Road, Wooldale; 53.57606°N 1.77009°W	—	17th or early 18th century	A pair of houses in rendered stone with a stone slate roof and chamfered coped gables on carved kneelers. There are two storeys and two bays. In the centre is a doorway, and there is another blocked doorway to the left. The windows have been altered, and some have retained their mullions.	II
61 and 63 Wooldale Road, Wooldale; 53.57613°N 1.76998°W	—	17th or early 18th century	A pair of houses that have been altered, they are in stone, partly rendered, with quoins, a stone slate roof, and two storeys. Most of the windows are mullioned, there is one single-light window, and a dormer.	II
67 Wooldale Road, Wooldale; 53.57608°N 1.76978°W	—	17th or early 18th century	The house, which has been much altered, is in rendered stone with a stone slate roof. There are two storeys, a central doorway, and mullioned windows, with some mullions removed.	II
Barn, Austonley Hall; 53.56206°N 1.82855°W	—	17th or early 18th century	The barn is in stone with quoins, a stone slate roof, and two storeys. In the south front are three entrances with millstone grit quoins, chamfered reveals, and Tudor arches, and a later larger doorway. In the upper storey are more openings, and in the gable end are external stairs to an upper floor doorway.	II
Building at rear of Lord Nelson Public House; 53.57622°N 1.77021°W	—	17th or early 18th century	Originally a house, it is in stone with quoins, and a stone slate roof with chamfered gable copings on shaped kneelers. There are two storeys, and the windows are mullioned.	II
Stoney Bank Cottage and Barn; 53.58246°N 1.76404°W	—	17th or early 18th century	A stone house with quoins, a stone slate roof, and two storeys. To the left is a gabled wing containing a gabled porch with a finial, and to its left is a cross window. Elsewhere are mullioned and transomed windows, and in the gable apex is a plaque. The barn is to the left, and it contains a large partly blocked entrance, and ventilation slits.	II
Wooldale Hall; 53.57603°N 1.77069°W	—	1714	The oldest part of the house is the rear wing, with the main range added in the late 19th century. The house is in millstone grit with quoins, a string course, a moulded eaves cornice, and a stone slate roof with chamfered gable copings on carved kneelers. There are two storeys, five bays, a rear wing and an outshut extension. The central doorway has a rectangular fanlight, a frieze and cornice. The windows on the front have single lights, and at the rear are chamfered windows with mullions removed.	II
4 and 5 Upper Hagg; 53.59195°N 1.78084°W	—	Early 18th century	A pair of houses in a terrace, originally one dwelling, they are in millstone grit on a plinth, with quoins, a stone slate roof, and two storeys. The doorway to No. 5 has a deep lintel, and the doorway to No, 4 is later. The windows are chamfered and mullioned, with some mullions removed.	II
House and barn, Austonley Hall; 53.56206°N 1.82873°W	—	Early 18th century (probable)	The house and barn adjoining the hall were altered in the 20th century. The house is in rendered stone with moulded gutter brackets, and a half-hipped stone slate roof with chamfered gable copings on moulded kneelers to the west. There are two storeys and the windows are modern with hood moulds. In the west gable wall are sash windows in the ground floor, and a mullioned window with some mullions removed in the upper floor. The barn is in stone with quoins and a stone slate roof, and it contains an original Tudor arched doorway.	II
Broad Lane Farmhouse; 53.56975°N 1.80465°W	—	Early 18th century	The farmhouse is in rendered stone with quoins, and a stone slate roof with a coped gable and kneelers to the south. There are two storeys, two bays, and a single-storey lean-to rear extension. Some of the windows are mullioned, and the others are sashes.	II
Cottage, Brownhill Farm; 53.57845°N 1.80208°W	—	Early 18th century	The cottage is in millstone grit and has a stone slate roof and two storeys. On the front is a doorway with chamfered reveals and a deep lintel, and the windows are mullioned, with some mullions removed.	II
Cricketers Arms; 53.58594°N 1.79067°W		Early 18th century	The public house is in stone with quoins and a stone slate roof. There are two storeys and two bays. In the centre is a gabled porch, and the doorway has chamfered reveals. The windows are mullioned, with four lights to the left and three lights to the right of the porch. Also at the right is a blocked doorway with a deep lintel.	II
Hagg Leys; 53.59303°N 1.77947°W	—	Early 18th century	A house and a former barn in one range, they are in stone with quoins, and a stone slate roof with coped gables and moulded kneelers to the north. There are two storeys, and the house has mullioned windows. The former barn contains two large segmental-arched doorways.	II
Ward Place House and Barn (west); 53.56314°N 1.79167°W	—	Early 18th century	The house and barn are in stone with moulded brackets and stone slate roofs. The farmhouse has two storeys, two bays and a later rear outshut extension. In the centre is a doorway with a chamfered surround and a Tudor arched lintel, and the windows are mullioned, with some mullions removed. The adjoining barn is at right angles, and contains a large doorway with a timber lintel on both fronts.	II
Waterside; 53.55759°N 1.81124°W	—	Early 18th century	A pair of houses that have been altered, they are in stone with quoins, a stone slate roof, and two storeys. The original doorway, which is partly blocked, is quoined and has a deep arched lintel, and there are two 19th-century inserted doorways. Most of the windows are mullioned, with some mullions removed, and there are two sash windows.	II
141A Thong Lane, Netherthong; 53.58351°N 1.79043°W	—	Early to mid 18th century	A cottage attached to a larger house, it is in stone with quoins and a stone slate roof with a coped gable and kneelers. There are three storeys and one bay, and the windows are mullioned. On the southeast front is a doorway with a deep lintel and a three-light window, and the upper floors contain four-light windows. At the rear there is a three-light window in each floor.	II
126 and 128 Town Gate, Netherthong; 53.58346°N 1.79105°W		Early to mid 18th century	A pair of back-to-back houses in stone, rendered on the side, with sill bands, moulded gutter brackets, and a stone slate roof. There are three storeys, and each house has one bay and mullioned windows The house facing the road has a doorway on the right, a three-light window to the left and a six-light window in both the upper floors. The house at the rear has a central doorway flanked by single-light windows, and in both upper floors is a seven-light window, with some lights blocked.	II
Croft House; 53.58306°N 1.79145°W	—	Early to mid 18th century	A stone house in a row, with quoins, a moulded eaves cornice, and a stone slate roof. There are two storeys and two bays. The near-central doorway has a chamfered lintel, most of the windows are mullioned, and there are two sash windows to the right of the doorway.	II
Centre Cottage, Moorgate; 53.58140°N 1.80588°W	—	Early to mid 18th century	The cottage, in the centre of a farm group, is in millstone grit, with quoins at the rear, and a stone slate roof. There are two storeys and a doorway with a deep Tudor arched lintel. Most of the windows are mullioned, including a six-light window in the upper floor on the front, mullions have been removed from other windows, and at the rear are single-light windows.	II
Westfield House; 53.58272°N 1.79177°W	—	Early to mid 18th century	A detached house in millstone grit, rendered at the rear, with quoins, moulded brackets, and a stone slate roof with coped gables and carved kneelers. There are two storeys and a basement, and three bays. The central doorway has a slightly arched head, and the windows are chamfered and mullioned.	II
Newlands; 53.57024°N 1.81315°W	—	1746	A farmhouse and a barn in one range, they are in millstone grit and have a stone slate roof. The house has two storeys and a rear extension, a doorway with a deep lintel and a datestone above, and mullioned windows. The barn is rendered and contains an entrance, a doorway, and a small vent.	II
40, 42 and 44 Cinderhills Road, Underbank; 53.56610°N 1.77750°W	—	Mid 18th century	A row of three stone houses, rendered on the south, with quoins and a stone slate roof. There are two storeys, on the front are two single-light windows with false arches, and the other windows are mullioned.	II
106–112 Dunford Road, Underbank; 53.56637°N 1.78199°W	—	Mid 18th century	A terrace of stone houses with quoins and a stone slate roof. There are two storeys on the east front and four on the west. The west front is symmetrical, and the windows are mullioned.	II
1 Town Gate, Upperthong; 53.57219°N 1.80616°W	—	Mid 18th century	A house, part of a row, it is in stone with quoins and a stone slate roof. There are two storeys, and a symmetrical front with a central doorway flanked by double-chamfered windows with the mullions removed.	II
3 Town Gate, Upperthong; 53.57214°N 1.80645°W	—	Mid 18th century	Two houses, later combined into one, it is in stone with quoins, a stone slate roof, and two storeys. On the front is a central doorway and mullioned windows. At the rear are paired doorways with millstone grit lintels, one blocked, and a fire window with a chamfered surround and a segmental false arch.	II
36 and 36A Town Gate, Upperthong; 53.57231°N 1.80825°W	—	Mid 18th century	The front of the house has been modernised, the house is in stone with quoins at the rear, and a stone slate roof. There are two storeys and doorways in both floors, with steps leading up to the upper doorway. The windows are double-chamfered with mullions.	II
39 and 41 Town Gate, Upperthong; 53.57211°N 1.80887°W	—	Mid 18th century	A pair of mirror-image houses in stone with quoins, and a stone slate roof with coped gables and moulded kneelers. There are two storeys, two doorways in the centre, and the windows are mullioned, with some mullions removed.	II
66 Town End Road, Wooldale; 53.57849°N 1.77378°W	—	Mid 18th century	A house in a terrace, it is in stone with quoins, a stone slate roof, two storeys, and mullioned windows. In the ground floor is a doorway, a single-light and a three-light window to the left, and the upper floor contains a five-light window.	II
Hillock; 53.57446°N 1.81813°W	—	Mid 18th century	A pair of houses, later extended, and combined into one dwelling, it is in stone with quoins and a tile roof. There are two storeys and an extension to the south. In the earlier, south, part is a doorway with a deep lintel and mullioned windows. The north part has a porch, an inserted bow window in the ground floor, and a seven-light mullioned window in the upper floor.	II
Kestrel and Kingfisher Cottages; 53.56080°N 1.81440°W	—	18th century	A pair of houses, part of a group, partly rebuilt in the 19th century, they are in millstone grit with quoins, and a stone slate roof with coped gables and moulded kneelers. There are two storeys, two central doorways, and the windows are mullioned.	II
Part of terrace, Lip Hill Lane; 53.57201°N 1.82059°W	—	18th century	The house in the centre of the farm terrace is in stone with a stone slate roof. There are two storeys, two bays, and a lean-to extension at the rear. The windows are chamfered and mullioned.	II
Pinfold, Carr Green; 53.56482°N 1.82050°W	—	18th century (presumed)	The pinfold is in stone with on-edge copings. It has a rectangular plan, and an opening on the west side with a stone lintel. To the north is a stone trough.	II
Ward Place House (east); 53.56336°N 1.79118°W	—	Mid 18th century	A stone house with quoins, a stone slate roof with coped gables, and two storeys. The doorway to the right has a chamfered surround and a deep lintel, and the windows are mullioned.	II
Wingfield (Centre Part); 53.57418°N 1.77921°W	—	Mid 18th century	The middle house in a row, it is in stone with a stone slate roof, and two storeys. On the front is a later porch with a reset datestone, and in each floor is a two-light and a three-light double chamfered mullioned window.	II
Wolfstones Heights; 53.57858°N 1.80944°W	—	1758	Originally two houses, now combined into one, and a barn in one range, they are in stone with quoins, and a stone slate roof with a coped gable on moulded kneelers to the east. The house has two storeys, and two central doorways, one blocked, with large tie-stones and a deep lintel. Above the doorway is a decorative initialled and dated plaque. The windows are mullioned, with some mullions removed and some lights blocked. The barn to the left contains a large segmental-arched quoined doorway with a small window above, and to the left is a lean-to extension. At the rear are mullioned and single-light windows.	II
59 Cliff Road, Cliff; 53.57172°N 1.78118°W	—	Mid to late 18th century	Two houses at the end of a row that have been extended and combined into one dwelling. It is in stone with quoins and coped gables on cut kneelers. In the right part is a doorway with a chamfered surround and a deep lintel, and in the left part is a blocked doorway. The windows are mullioned, with some mullions removed.	II
Fox House Farmhouse; 53.58219°N 1.80156°W	—	Mid to late 18th century	Originally a pair of mirror-image houses and a barn at right angles, later combined into a single dwelling, it is in millstone grit with quoins and a stone slate roof with coped gables and moulded kneelers. The house has two storeys, and in the centre are paired doorways, one partly blocked, with quoined surrounds and deep lintels. The windows are mulliond, with some mullions removed. The barn contains a large glass-filled segmental-headed doorway, and modern windows.	II
Holmroyd Nook (east); 53.58428°N 1.80350°W	—	Mid to late 18th century	Two dwellings and a barn in one range, later combined into one dwelling, it is in stone with quoins and a stone slate roof. The former dwellings have two storeys, two central doorways, one blocked, and mullioned windows with some mullions removed. The barn to the right has a large central round-arched doorway flanked by two smaller doorways, and windows have been added. At the rear is a central doorway with a lintel on rounded corbels.	II
Holmroyd Nook (west); 53.58410°N 1.80408°W	—	Mid to late 18th century	A farmhouse that was extended in the 19th century, it is in millstone grit with quoins, moulded gutter brackets, and a stone slate roof with moulded kneelers. There are two storeys and two bays. In the centre is a doorway with a deep lintel, and the windows are mullioned with some mullions removed and some lights blocked.	II
Netherthong Wesleyan Methodist Chapel; 53.58541°N 1.79208°W	—	1769	The chapel, later converted for residential use, is in stone with rusticated quoins, a string course, moulded brackets, and a stone slate roof with coped gables and moulded kneelers. There are two storeys to the south, one to the north, and a single-story extension to the west. The south front is symmetrical and contains two doorways with semicircular fanlights, two slim windows with semicircular heads, impost blocks and keystones, and there are semicircular motifs between the windows. In the upper storey are further semicircular-headed windows.	II
1, 2, 3 and 4 Carr Lane, Hogley Green; 53.56725°N 1.81876°W	—	Late 18th century	A row of four farm cottages in stone with quoins to the northeast, a stone slate roof, and two storeys. On the front are four doorways, one with a porch, and two blocked doorways with deep lintels. The windows are mullioned, and there is an inserted bow window.	II
1 and 2 Hollin House; 53.57196°N 1.74415°W	—	Late 18th century	A house, part of a group, it is in stone, and has a stone slate roof with coped gables and carved kneelers. There are two storeys, the front of the house has been altered, and at the rear is a central doorway and mullioned windows.	II
7 Town End Road, Holmfirth; 53.57621°N 1.77944°W	—	Late 18th century	A stone house in a terrace, it has quoins and a half-hipped stone slate roof. There are three storeys at the front and four at the rear. In the centre are two doorways, one blocked, and the windows are mullioned.	II
11 Outlane, Netherthong; 53.58373°N 1.79156°W	—	Late 18th century	A stone house, partly rendered, with quoins and a stone slate roof. There are two storeys and a basement, and three bays. In the centre is a doorway, and the windows are mullioned.	II
15 Outlane, Netherthong; 53.58397°N 1.79163°W	—	Late 18th century	A stone house with quoins and a stone slate roof with kneelers. There are two storeys and an attic, with the gable end facing the street. On the front is a doorway to the left, mullioned windows with one light blocked, and in the gable apex is a Venetian window with the central light blocked.	II
27 Outlane, Netherthong; 53.58404°N 1.79224°W	—	Late 18th century	A house, part of a group, it is in stone with quoins, and a stone slate roof with moulded kneelers. There are two storeys, some of the windows are mullioned, and others have been altered.	II
1 St Ann's Square, Netherthong; 53.58322°N 1.79169°W	—	Late 18th century	A stone house, part of a row, it has quoins and a stone slate roof. There are two storeys, a near-central doorway with a deep lintel, and mullioned windows.	II
11 Heys Road, Thongsbridge; 53.58230°N 1.77207°W	—	Late 18th century	A stone house with quoins, moulded gutter brackets, and a stone slate roof with coped gables and carved kneelers. There are two storeys and an attic, and a rear two-storey lean-to extension. In the centre is a doorway that is partly blocked, and a later doorway to the right. The windows are mullioned, and in the extension is a stair window.	II
29, 31, 33, 35 and 37 Heys Road, Thongsbridge; 53.58150°N 1.77198°W	—	Late 18th century	A terrace of stone houses with quoins, and a stone slate roof with moulded kneelers. There are three storeys, and the doorways have deep lintels. Most of the windows are mullioned, and some mullions have been removed and casement windows inserted.	II
6 Upper Hagg; 53.59184°N 1.78100°W	—	Late 18th century	A stone house with quoins, moulded brackets, and a stone slate roof with coped gables and moulded kneelers. There are two storeys and one bay. The doorway is to the right, and in each floor is a five-light mullioned window.	II
2 Wickins Lane, Upperthong; 53.57260°N 1.80934°W	—	Late 18th century	Three houses combined into one, it is in stone with quoins and a stone slate roof with coped gables and moulded kneelers. There are two storeys, and the right part contains two partly blocked doorways and windows that have rendered surrounds and mullions. To the left is another doorway, a bow window, and casement windows.	II
92 Lower Town End Road, Wooldale; 53.57883°N 1.77156°W	—	Late 18th century	A stone house with quoins and a stone slate roof. There are two storeys and two bays. The doorway is near the centre, and the windows are mullioned.	II
15, 17, 19 and 21 South Lane, Wooldale; 53.57553°N 1.77071°W	—	Late 18th century	A terrace of four houses with quoins and a stone slate roof. There are two storeys, and the end house is at right angles and partly rendered. One house has a porch, and the windows are mullioned.	II
73 Town End Road, Wooldale; 53.57868°N 1.77317°W	—	Late 18th century	A stone house in a group, it has quoins, moulded gutter brackets, and a stone slate roof. There are two storeys and three bays. In the centre is a doorway, to its left is a two-light mullioned window, and the other windows have single lights.	II
75 and 77 Town End Road, Wooldale; 53.57874°N 1.77305°W	—	Late 18th century	A pair of stone houses, No. 77 being later and dating from the early to mid 19th century. They have quoins and a stone slate roof with coped gables and carved kneelers to No. 75. There are two storeys, the doorways are in the centre, and that of No. 75 has a deep lintel. The windows are mullioned, and each house has a three-light window in the ground floor and a six-light window in the upper floor.	II
41 Wooldale Road, Wooldale; 53.57700°N 1.77142°W	—	Late 18th century	A detached stone house on a corner site, it has quoins, and a stone slate roof with coped gables and carved kneelers. There are two storeys and one bay, and the windows are mullioned.	II
69 Wooldale Road, Wooldale; 53.57569°N 1.76961°W	—	Late 18th century	A detached stone house with quoins and a stone slate roof. There are three storeys, and a later outshut at the rear. In the centre is a doorway, and most of the windows are mullioned, some have been altered, and there is a single-light window.	II
Building to rear of 33 Outlane, Netherthong; 53.58426°N 1.79225°W	—	Late 18th century	The cottage is attached to a house. It is in stone with quoins, and a stone slate roof. There are two storeys and two bays. The doorway has a deep lintel, and the windows are mullioned.	II
Hagg House; 53.58930°N 1.77997°W	—	Late 18th century	A stone house with quoins and a stone slate roof. The main block has three storeys at the front and two at the rear, and two bays. In the centre is a doorway flanked by bay windows, and elsewhere the windows are mullioned. Recessed to the left is a single bay containing a doorway with a fanlight and single-light windows above, and to the left of this is a further extension. To the right is a two-storey extension, and at the rear is a staircase window.	II
Ivy Cottage; 53.57213°N 1.76878°W	—	Late 18th century	A house with a former warehouse incorporated to the left, it is in stone with quoins and a stone slate roof. The house has three storeys, three bays, and a two-storey rear extension. In the centre is a doorway, and the windows are mullioned. In the former warehouse, a carriage entrance has been blocked and windows inserted.	II
Pell Croft; 53.57764°N 1.77084°W	—	Late 18th century	Originally a farm terrace, consisting of a barn to the left, a two-bay house to the right of it, then a one-bay house, and recessed at the end a one-bay cottage. The building is in stone with quoins and a tile roof. There are two storeys, and the windows are mullioned.	II
Upper Wickens; 53.57405°N 1.81383°W	—	Late 18th century	A farm terrace consisting of three houses and two barns in one range, they are in stone with quoins, and a stone slate roof with coped gables and carved kneelers. The houses have two storeys, three doorways, one of which is blocked, and mullioned windows. The barns contain, at the front a large quoined doorway with a segmental-arched head, a smaller doorway and mullioned windows, and at the rear are two large segmental-arched doorways.	II
Whinney Bank Cottages; 53.57245°N 1.77335°W	—	Late 18th century	A terrace of five cottages, later combined into three, they are in stone with quoins, and coped gables with carved kneelers. They have two storeys, and the cottage on the right also has an attic. Most windows are mullioned, with some mullions removed.	II
Holy Trinity Church, Holmfirth; 53.57012°N 1.78589°W		1782–86	The church, which is in Classical style, is built in stone with a modillion eaves cornice, and a stone slate roof. There are two storeys and sides of three and five bays. The church consists of a nave and a small chancel, over which is a tower with an embattled parapet and pinnacles. The entrance on the south side has a moulded surround, and a segmental pediment on consoles. In the upper storey, the windows have segmental heads, and in the lower storey they have round heads. Inside, there is a gallery on three sides.	II
Friends Meeting House, outbuilding and wall 53.57814°N 1.77011°W		1783	The Quaker meeting house is in stone with quoins and s stone slate roof. There is one storey and five bays. The doorways are in the left two bays, and the windows are tall with small panes. Inside the meeting house is a west gallery on Doric columns. There is an extension and a small adjoining outbuilding to the rear, and the area surrounding the meeting house is enclosed by a stone wall.	II
179–189 Huddersfield Road, Netherthong; 53.58007°N 1.78252°W		1790	A group of six back-to-back weavers' houses, they are in stone with a stone slate roof, three storeys and attics. The windows are mullioned, some lights are blocked, and over the entrance to No. 183 is an inscription and the date.	II
13 and 15 Cliff Lane, Cliff; 53.57210°N 1.78254°W	—	Late 18th to early 19th century	A pair of stone houses, partly rendered, with quoins and a stone slate roof with coped gables and kneelers. There are two storeys and a basement, and a later extension to the south. Most of the windows are mullioned, there are some single lights, and an inserted bow window.	II
11, 13 and 15 Flush House, Holmbridge; 53.56301°N 1.82808°W	—	Late 18th to early 19th century	A terrace of stone houses with quoins, and a concrete tile roof with coped gables and moulded kneelers. There are two storeys, and the windows are mullioned.	II
12 Flush House, Holmbridge; 53.56352°N 1.82735°W	—	Late 18th to early 19th century	A house in a terrace, it is in stone with quoins, and a stone slate roof with coped gables. The doorway has a rendered surround and the windows are mullioned.	II
147 Town Gate, Netherthong; 53.58315°N 1.79137°W	—	Late 18th to early 19th century	The house, possibly converted from a barn, is in stone with quoins and a stone slate roof. There are three storeys, most of the windows are mullioned, and there are some single lights. The gabled northeast front contains a doorway with a deep lintel, and in each of the upper floors are six-light windows. In the northwest front is a segmental-headed archway.	II
73 and 75 Wooldale Road, Wooldale; 53.57531°N 1.77015°W	—	Late 18th to early 19th century	A pair of stone houses with quoins and a stone slate roof with coped gables and carved kneelers. There are two storeys at the front and three at the rear, and the windows are mullioned.	II
Austonley Hall; 53.56195°N 1.82871°W	—	Late 18th to early 19th century	A stone house with quoins to the north, a string course with moulded brackets, and a hipped stone slate roof with a coped gable. There are three storeys on the front, and two bays. In the centre is a doorway with millstone grit quoins, chamfered reveals, and a deep lintel, and above it is a square plaque with a figure and harp motif and an inscription. On the front are two three-light mullioned window in each floor, the gable end has two storeys and contains sash windows, and at the rear is a five-light mullioned window.	II
Hillside Cottage; 53.56373°N 1.81648°W	—	Late 18th to early 19th century	A pair of stone houses with quoins, and a stone slate roof with coped gables. There are three storeys, and the windows are mullioned, with some mullions removed and some lights blocked.	II
Knoll Bridge Farmhouse and Barn; 53.58294°N 1.80963°W	—	Late 18th to early 19th century	The house and barn are in stone and have a stone slate roof with coped gables and moulded kneelers. The house has two storeys, and a single-storey extension to the right. There is a central doorway at the front and the rear, most of the windows are mullioned, including a continuous twelve-light window in the upper floor at the front, and at the rear is a bow window. The barn projects at right angles on the left, and has quoins, a central doorway with a segmental arch, and a mullioned window above.	II
Lower Wickens Farmhouse; 53.57521°N 1.81165°W	—	Late 18th to early 19th century	The farmhouse, part of a group, is in stone with moulded gutter brackets, and a stone slate roof with coped gables and carved kneelers. There are two storeys, the near-central doorway has a deep lintel, and the windows are mullioned with some blocked lights.	II
New Laith (House to southwest); 53.56690°N 1.82406°W	—	Late 18th to early 19th century	A stone house that has a stone slate roof with coped gables and carved kneelers. There are two storeys, a modern flat-roofed extension to the left, and a single-storey lean-to on the right. The windows are mullioned and one light has been blocked.	II
Ox Lane Farmhouse; 53.58097°N 1.80366°W	—	Late 18th to early 19th century	A pair of mirror-image houses, part of a farm row, they are in stone with quoins, and a stone slate roof with coped gables. There are three storeys and two bays. The doorways are in the outer parts and the windows are mullioned, with some lights blocked.	II
Sundial, Friends Meeting House; 53.57808°N 1.77004°W	—	1801	The sundial in the grounds of the meeting house, and is in stone. It stands on a pedestal, and has a square head inscribed on all four faces and on the top.	II
Bridge Tavern; 53.55784°N 1.81854°W		1809	Originally two or three houses, later a public house, it is in stone with moulded gutter brackets and a stone slate roof. There are three storeys and four bays. In the ground floor are modern bow windows, and the upper floors contain mullioned windows and a datestone.	II
Amiens Column, Holmfirth; 53.57058°N 1.78590°W		1810	A monument commemorating the Peace of Amiens, it is in stone, and consists of an octagonal column and base on a rough square block. At the top is a moulded square capital surmounted by a ball finial. On the column is an inscribed plaque.	II
Hall Croft; 53.56362°N 1.81998°W		1816	A Sunday school, later extended and converted into a private house, it is in stone, and has a stone slate roof with coped gables. There is one storey and a basement; originally with five bays, two bays were added to the right. The middle of the original bays projects forward under an open pediment containing an inscribed and dated plaque, and steps lead up to a doorway below. Five of the other bays contain casement windows in round-arched recesses, in the right bay is a blocked doorway, below which is a modern garage door.	II
12, 14, 16, and 18 Bunkers Hill, Cliff; 53.57053°N 1.78491°W	—	Early 19th century	A terrace of stone houses with quoins, a stone slate roof, and three storeys. On the front is a porch, most of the windows are mullioned, and there is one sash window.	II
1 Well Hill, Cinder Hills; 53.56653°N 1.78013°W	—	Early 19th century	Two dwellings, part of a row, later combined into one, it is in stone with a stone slate roof. There are three storeys and three bays, and the windows are mullioned.	II
45 and 47 Cliff Road, Cliff; 53.57147°N 1.78116°W	—	Early 19th century	A pair of mirror-image houses in stone, with a stone slate roof and coped gables. There are two storeys and two doorways, the right one blocked. The windows are mullioned; in the ground floor they have three lights, and in the upper floor six lights.	II
52, 54, 56, 58, 60 and 62 Old Road, Hinchcliffe Mill; 53.55962°N 1.81229°W	—	Early 19th century	A terrace of six stone houses, with quoins and a stone slate roof. There is one storey at the front and three at the rear. Most of the windows are mullioned, some mullions have been removed, and there are blocked lights, some windows have single lights, and there are inserted sash windows.	II
1 Spring Lane, Hinchcliffe Mill; 53.55952°N 1.81045°W	—	Early 19th century	A house, part of a terrace, it is in stone with a coped gable. In the centre is a doorway, and the windows are mullioned.	II
1 and 2 Water Street, Hinchcliffe Mill; 53.56024°N 1.81071°W	—	Early 19th century	Two houses, part of a row, in stone with a stone slate roof. There are two storeys, and each house has a doorway and mullioned windows, with some mullions removed. At the rear is a passage entry.	II
1, 3 and 5 Flush House, Holmbridge; 53.56337°N 1.82714°W	—	Early 19th century	Three houses at the end of a terrace, they are in stone with moulded gutter brackets and a stone slate roof. There are two storeys, No. 3 has three bays, No. 1 has two doorways, one with a porch, and the windows are mullioned.	II
230–236 and 240–244 Woodhead Road, Holmbridge; 53.55576°N 1.82216°W	—	Early 19th century	A terrace of four houses with underdwellings, they are in stone with quoins, and roofs partly tiled and partly in stone slate. There are three storeys and on the front of each house facing the road are two bays. The windows are mullioned, and some mullions have been removed.	II
8 and 10 Bunkers Hill, Holmfirth; 53.57037°N 1.78516°W	—	Early 19th century	A symmetrical pair of houses in stone with quoins to No. 10 and a stone slate roof with a coped gable and moulded kneelers to the southwest. There are three storeys at the front and two at the rear. On the front are mullioned windows with some blocked lights, and the rear has been altered.	II
25 and 27 Hollowgate, Holmfirth; 53.56939°N 1.78782°W	—	Early 19th century	A pair of houses, part of a terrace, later used for other purposes, they are in stone with moulded gutter brackets, and a stone slate roof with a coped with a kneeler at the rear. There are three storeys, each part has one bay, and there is an additional narrow bay on the left. In the left bay is a shop windows, the other windows are mullioned, and at the rear is a partly blocked taking-in door.	II
58 Huddersfield Road and 58 Norridge Bottom, Holmfirth; 53.57049°N 1.78716°W	—	Early 19th century	Part of a terrace with underdwellings, it is in stone with a tile roof. There are two storeys at the front and four at the rear. On the front are three bays, with a doorway and a shop window to the right in the ground floor, a sash window to the left, and sash windows in the upper floor. At the rear, the ground floor contains a doorway with a deep lintel, a smaller doorway, and a single-light window, and in each of the upper floors is a ten-light mullioned window.	II
23, 25 and 27 South Lane, Holmfirth; 53.56959°N 1.78505°W	—	Early 19th century	A row of three stone houses with coped gables and carved kneelers. There are three storeys, No. 23 has one bay, the other houses have two bays each, and there is a lean-to on the right. The windows flanking the doorway of No. 27 are sashes, and the other windows are mullioned.	II
18, 19 and 20 Dean Brook Road, Netherthong; 53.58645°N 1.78803°W	—	Early 19th century	Three stone houses in a terrace with a stone slate roof, three storeys, and mullioned windows. Each house has a doorway, a three-light window in the ground floor, two two-light windows in the middle floor, and a five-light window in the top floor.	II
21 and 22 Dean Brook Road, Netherthong; 53.58637°N 1.78825°W	—	Early 19th century	Two houses in a terrace, in stone with a stone slate roof. There are two storeys, each house has a doorway, and the windows are mullioned.	II
26, 27 and 31 Deanhouse Road, Netherthong; 53.58606°N 1.79023°W	—	Early 19th century	Originally four back-to-back weavers' houses, later three dwellings, they are in stone with a stone slate roof. There are three storeys, and the windows either have single lights or are mullioned; on the front and at the rear there are two eight-light windows in each of the upper floors.	II
28 and 29 Deanhouse Road, Netherthong; 53.58601°N 1.79045°W		Early 19th century	A pair of stone houses at the end of a terrace, they have a stone slate roof and three storeys. The windows are mullioned, and in both of the upper floors of each house are eight-light windows, with some blocked lights.	II
1 and 2 Dock Hill, Netherthong; 53.58482°N 1.79235°W	—	Early 19th century	A pair of mirror-image stone houses with a stone slate roof. There are three storeys at the front and two at the rear. In the centres of the front and the rear are doorways, and the windows are mullioned.	II
3 Dock Hill, Netherthong; 53.58474°N 1.79234°W	—	Early 19th century	A stone cottage with a stone slate roof, two storeys, and two bays. In the centre is a doorway, and there are two three-light mullioned windows in each floor.	II
8 Giles Street, Netherthong; 53.58415°N 1.79104°W	—	Early 19th century	Two houses later combined into one, it is in stone with a stone slate roof and three storeys. In the centre is a doorway with a modern bow window inserted to the right. The other windows are mullioned, with many blocked lights. At the rear, which is back-to-earth, is a large extension.	II
191 Huddersfield Road, Netherthong; 53.58015°N 1.78314°W	—	Early 19th century	A stone house with a stone slate roof, two storeys, two bays and an extension to the right, and mullioned windows. In the centre is a doorway, with a two-light window on the left and a three-light window on the right. The upper floor contains a ten-light window and in the extension is a doorway.	II
5 Outlane, Netherthong; 53.58372°N 1.79167°W	—	Early 19th century	A stone house in a terrace, with a stone slate roof, three storeys, and mullioned windows. In the ground floor is a doorway with a deep lintel and a three-light window to the left, and in the upper floors are four-light windows.	II
7 Outlane, Netherthong; 53.58368°N 1.79183°W	—	Early 19th century	A stone house is a terrace, the rear is partly rendered, and it has a stone slate roof. There are three storeys, a central doorway, a single-light window, and the other windows are mullioned.	II
115, 117 and 119 Thong Lane, Netherthong; 53.58408°N 1.78964°W	—	Early 19th century	A terrace of three houses in stone with stone slate roofs. No. 119 has three storeys, and the other houses have two. In the ground floor are two doorways, one with a deep lintel, and single-light windows. The windows in the upper floors are mainly mullioned, and some are sashes.	II
121 and 123 Thong Lane, Netherthong; 53.58416°N 1.78973°W	—	Early 19th century	A pair of mirror-image houses in stone with quoins and a stone slate roof. There are two storeys, each house has one bay, and there is a lean-to extension on the left. The doorways are in the centre, and the windows are mullioned, with three lights in each floor.	II
125 Thong Lane, Netherthong; 53.58412°N 1.78981°W	—	Early 19th century	A house in a terrace, it is in stone with quoins, moulded gutter brackets, and a stone slate roof. There are two storeys and one bay. The doorway is to the left, and there is a three-light mullioned window in each floor.	II
131 Thong Lane, Netherthong; 53.58401°N 1.79000°W	—	Early 19th century	A stone house with quoins and a stone slate roof. There are two storeys on the north front and three on the south, and the windows are mullioned. The left bay of the north front projects and contains a three-light window in each floor. On the south front is a porch flanked by single-light windows, and a ground floor extension. In the middle floor are three- and four-light windows and the top floor contains a ten-light window, the middle four lights blocked.	II
133 and 135 Thong Lane, Netherthong; 53.58394°N 1.79013°W	—	Early 19th century	A pair of stone houses in a terrace, with quoins and a stone slate roof. There are three storeys, each house has one bay, and the windows are mullioned. On the north front the doorways have canopies, and on the south front is a porch extension.	II
5 Cinderhills Road, Underbank; 53.56769°N 1.78015°W	—	Early 19th century	A stone house with quoins and a stone slate roof. There are three storeys and one bay, and the windows are mullioned.	II
2, 3, 4, 5 and 6 Gully Terrace, Underbank; 53.56744°N 1.78057°W	—	Early 19th century	A terrace of five houses running down a hillside, they are in stone with a stone slate roof and two storeys. Each house has a doorway, and single-light and mullioned windows.	II
1, 3, 5, 7 and 9 Woodhead Road, Upper Bridge; 53.56887°N 1.79037°W	—	Early 19th century	Two houses, the north front was rebuilt in about 1900, and the building has been divided into five dwellings. It is in stone with quoins to the south, and a stone slate roof with a coped gable and moulded kneelers to the southeast. There are four storeys at the front and two at the rear. In the ground floor are casement windows, and above are mullioned windows, some with ten lights.	II
25 and 27 Woodhead Road, Upper Bridge; 53.56795°N 1.79317°W	—	Early 19th century	A pair of stone cottages with a stone slate roof and coped gables. There are two storeys, and the windows either have single lights, or are mullioned.	II
92, 94, 96 and 100 Cliff Road, Wooldale; 53.57815°N 1.77464°W	—	Early 19th century	A group of back-to-back houses, they are in stone with a stone slate roof. There are three storeys, with a ground floor extension to the northwest. The windows are mullioned, and some lights have been removed.	II
110 and 112 Lower Town End Road, Wooldale; 53.57869°N 1.77019°W	—	Early 19th century	A terrace of formerly four houses, later converted into two, in stone with a stone slate roof. They have three storeys, and the windows are mullioned.	II
1, 3 and 5 South Lane, Wooldale; 53.57572°N 1.77029°W	—	Early 19th century	A row of three stone houses with a stone slate roof and three storeys. One house has a porch, and the windows are mullioned.	II
Booth House, 2 and 4 Booth House Lane; 53.56570°N 1.80876°W	—	Early 19th century	A pair of stone houses with a stone slate roof. There are two storeys and an extension to the southeast. Each house has a doorway and mullioned windows, with one blocked light.	II
Carr Farmhouse; 53.57728°N 1.81137°W	—	Early 19th century	Originally two dwellings and a barn at right angles, the farmhouse is in stone, and has a stone slate roof with coped gables and moulded kneelers. There are two storeys, the house contains mullioned windows with some mullions removed and some lights blocked, and in the barn is a large doorway with a segmental arch and a smaller doorway.	II
Cliff Farmhouse and barn 53.56521°N 1.82863°W	—	Early 19th century	The building consists of two dwellings and a barn in one range. It is in stone and has a stone slate roof with a coped gable to the west. There are two storeys, and the windows are mullioned, with some blocked lights. In the barn is a large doorway with a modern lintel.	II
Deanhouse; 53.58691°N 1.78669°W	—	Early 19th century	A pair of stone houses, partly rendered, with a stone slate roof. There are two storeys and an attic, and four bays. The windows are mullioned, on the southeast front is a blocked doorway, and the entrance is in the northeast gable end.	II
Green Gate; 53.56582°N 1.83252°W	—	Early 19th century	A stone house, partly rendered, that has a stone slate roof with coped gables. There are two storeys, a symmetrical front of three bays, and mullioned windows. In the centre is a doorway and a porch flanked by three-light windows, and in the upper floor is a twelve-light window with blocked lights making three two-light windows.	II
Hill Farm; 53.57233°N 1.79127°W	—	Early 19th century	Two houses, part of a group, they are in stone with a stone slate roof. The house on the left has three storeys, and the house on the right has two. Both houses have mullioned windows with some lights blocked, and there are extensions at the rear.	II
Hill House; 53.55653°N 1.80252°W	—	Early 19th century	A pair of mirror-image houses combined into one, it is in stone and has a stone slate roof with coped gables. There are three storeys and the windows are mullioned. in the ground floor, two-light windows are flanked by doorways, and the upper floors of each part contain six-light windows, with blocked lights in the top floor.	II
Hollowgate Bridge; 53.56934°N 1.78881°W		Early 19th century	The bridge carries Hollowgate over the River Holme. It is in stone, and consists of a single shallow segmental arch. The bridge has a parapet on a string course.	II
Lower Green Gate and Barn; 53.56536°N 1.83146°W	—	Early 19th century	Originally a terrace of three houses with a barn added later, the building is in stone and has a stone slate roof with coped gables. There are two storeys, two doorways, in the ground floor are later single-light windows, and in the upper floor and at the rear the windows are mullioned. The barn to the east has a large central doorway with a deep lintel on rounded corbels, and a small vent with a semicircular head.	II
Malkin House; 53.56240°N 1.79810°W	—	Early 19th century	A stone house, part of a group, with quoins, and a stone slate roof with coped gables and carved kneelers. There are three storeys, four bays, and a single-bay extension at each end. The doorway has a fanlight, the windows are mullioned, and at the rear is a taking-in door in the middle floor.	II
Milestone near the centre of Holmfirth; 53.57420°N 1.78503°W		Early 19th century	The milestone is on the east side of the A6042 road. It consists of a stone post with a rounded top, and it is inscribed with the distances to Huddersfield and Woodhead.	II
Mytholm Bridge; 53.58835°N 1.77042°W	—	Early 19th century	The bridge carries Luke Lane over New Mill Dyke. It is in stone, and consists of a single segmental arch. The bridge has a string course and a parapet with triangular copings.	II
Old Lock-up, Holmfirth; 53.57022°N 1.78550°W	—	Early 19th century	The former lock-up is in stone with a stone slate roof and two storeys. In the north front is a large carriage entry with a massive lintel on rounded corbels, and in other fronts are doorways, one blocked. The upper floor has a narrow slit opening with a vertical bar.	II
Sunny Brow; 53.57470°N 1.77123°W	—	Early 19th century	A house and farm building in one range, they are in stone with moulded brackets and a stone slate roof. The house has two storeys, a central doorway with a deep lintel, and mullioned windows with some blocked lights. The farm building to the left contains an entrance, windows and a square pitching hole.	II
Field Top and barn 53.56014°N 1.81283°W	—	1826	A house and a barn in one range, they are in stone, with a stone slate roof and a coped gable. The house has two storeys, a central doorway, mullioned windows with some blocked lights, a datestone on the front, and a taking-in door at the rear. The barn contains a large central doorway with stilted elliptical arch.	II
15 and 17 Dobb Lane, Hinchcliffe Mill; 53.55903°N 1.81180°W	—	1827	A Sunday school converted into two dwellings, it is in stone with string courses and a stone slate roof with coped gables. There are three storeys and a symmetrical gabled front of three bays. In the ground floor are two doorways, the top floor contains a Venetian window, the other windows are sashes, and in the gable apex is a plaque.	II
All Saints Church, Netherthong; 53.58309°N 1.79089°W		1829–30	A Commissioners' church designed by R. D Cantrell, it was remodelled and the chancel was extended in 1876–77 by W. Swinden Barber. The church is built in stone with a slate roof, and consists of a nave, a chancel, and a gabled projection at the west end. There are embattled gables at the west and east ends, at the west end is an ornate bellcote with flying buttresses, and at the angles of the church are semi-octagonal buttresses that rise to embattled turrets. The windows are lancets with Decorated tracery.	II
Gate piers, gates and overthrow, All Saints Church; 53.58326°N 1.79114°W	—	c. 1830	At the entry to the churchyard are octagonal stone gate piers with embattled copings. Between them are iron gates and an overthrow.	II
142–150 Huddersfield Road, Under Hill; 53.57346°N 1.78486°W	—	c. 1830	A row of stone houses with a moulded floor band and a stone slate roof. There are two storeys and a basement, and the windows are sashes. The outer bays are recessed, and each contains a round-headed doorway with a rusticated surround and doors with fanlights. Toward the centre are two doorways with plain surrounds, square heads, and fanlights.	II
Wooldale Methodist Church; 53.57634°N 1.77096°W	—	c. 1830	The church was extended in 1880–90. It is in stone, the original part has a stone slate roof, the roof of the extension is in blue slate, and the gables are coped. The original part has five bays, and contains round-arched windows with impost blocks and keystones, and in the right bay is a porch with a moulded cornice and a blocking course. The extension is at right angles with six bays, and the front facing the road has a gable with a stepped and scrolled parapet, and a scrolled pediment at the apex. In the centre is an oculus with a hood mould and keystone, and on the parapet are ball finials. The front contains a central three-light window and flanking single-light windows, all with round heads, and an overall continuous hood mould.	II
26 and 28 Fairfields Road, Hinchcliffe Mill; 53.56111°N 1.81061°W	—	Early to mid 19th century	A pair of cottages in a row, they are in stone and have a stone slate roof. There are two storeys, and the windows are mullioned. Each cottage has a doorway to the left, a three-light window to the right, and a two-light and a three-light window in the upper floor.	II
2, 4, 6, and 8 Old Road, and 121, 123 and 123A Woodhead Road, Hinchcliffe Mill; 53.56022°N 1.81128°W	—	Early to mid 19th century	A terrace with underdwellings in stone with a stone slate roof, three storeys and basements. On Woodhead Road, the entrances are in the top floor, and are approached by bridges. Most of the windows are mullioned, some with six lights on the top floor on Old Road, and there are some single-light windows.	II
9, 11 and 13 Old Road, Hinchcliffe Mill; 53.55966°N 1.81219°W	—	Early to mid 19th century	Three houses in a terrace, they are in stone with moulded gutter brackets and a stone slate roof. There are two storeys at the front and four at the rear. At the front is a central doorway and sash windows, and at the rear the windows are mullioned with some lights blocked.	II
5 Spring Lane, Hinchcliffe Mill; 53.55926°N 1.81157°W	—	Early to mid 19th century	A stone house in a terrace, with a stone slate roof and three storeys. The windows are mullioned, there is a three-light and a two-light window in each floor, and the doorway is on the right.	II
38 and 38A Back Lane, Holmfirth; 53.57059°N 1.78483°W	—	Early to mid 19th century	A pair of houses in a row, they are in stone with quoins and a stone slate roof. There are three storeys at the front and one at the rear. The windows are mullioned, and the top floor at the front contains a continuous 13-light window.	II
64 Huddersfield Road and 64 Norridge Bottom, Holmfirth; 53.57062°N 1.78712°W	—	Early to mid 19th century	Part of a terrace with underdwellings, it is in stone with a stone slate roof. There are two storeys at the front and four at the rear. On the front are two bays, with a doorway and a shop window in the ground floor, and sash windows in the upper floor. At the rear, the windows are mullioned. In the ground floor is a doorway and a four-light window, the first floor contains a four-light window and a taking-in door, and in the top floors are six-light windows.	II
66 and 68 Huddersfield Road and 66 and 68 Norridge Bottom, Holmfirth; 53.57070°N 1.78709°W	—	Early to mid 19th century	Part of a terrace with underdwellings, it is in stone with a tile roof. There are two storeys at the front and four at the rear. At the front are two entrances and two shop windows, and in the upper floor are a three-light mullioned window and a single light window. At the rear is an entrance in the ground floor, and mullioned windows in all floors.	II
70 and 72 Huddersfield Road and 70 and 72 Norridge Bottom, Holmfirth; 53.57070°N 1.78709°W	—	Early to mid 19th century	Part of a terrace with underdwellings, it is in stone with a tile roof. There are two storeys at the front and four at the rear. At the front are two entrances and two shop windows, and in the upper floor are two large single-light windows. At the rear is an entrance in the ground floor, and mullioned windows in all floors.	II
74 and 76 Huddersfield Road and 74 and 76 Norridge Bottom, Holmfirth; 53.57083°N 1.78693°W	—	Early to mid 19th century	A shop and an underdwelling in stone with a stone slate roof. There are two storeys at the front and four at the rear. At the front is a doorway and a shop window, and an eight-light mullioned window above. At the rear are entrances in the ground and first floors, in the third floor is a seven-light mullioned window, and some lights have sliding sashes.	II
84 Huddersfield Road and 84 Norridge Bottom, Holmfirth; 53.57096°N 1.78687°W	—	Early to mid 19th century	The building is in a terrace with an underdwelling. It is in stone with a stone slate roof, and has two storeys at the front and four at the rear. At the front is a doorway, and a three-light mullioned window in the upper floor. At the rear are a doorway, an entrance and a two-light window, and above are mullioned windows with some lights blocked.	II
86 Huddersfield Road and 86 Norridge Bottom, Holmfirth; 53.57103°N 1.78687°W	—	Early to mid 19th century	The building is at the end of a terrace and has an underbuilding. It is in stone with a stone slate roof, and has two storeys at the front and four at the rear. At the front are three bays and a single-storey extension to the right with a hipped roof. In the ground floor are two doorways and four shop fronts, and the upper floor contains three sash windows. At the rear is a ground floor entrance and mullioned windows.	II
25 and 27 Station Road, Holmfirth; 53.57117°N 1.78480°W	—	Early to mid 19th century	A pair of stone buildings with a stone slate roof. They are in two and three storeys, and the windows are mullioned, with some lights blocked.	II
20–32 Victoria Street, Holmfirth; 53.57014°N 1.78710°W	—	Early to mid 19th century	A terrace containing shops and a bank in stone, with sill bands, a moulded eaves cornice, and a stone slate roof. There are three storeys, and in the ground floor are later shop and bank fronts. The bank front to No. 28 extends up to the middle floor, and contains six moulded arched openings, the left a doorway. Elsewhere in the upper floors are sash windows.	II
21 and 23 Cinderhills Road, Underbank; 53.56719°N 1.78000°W	—	Early to mid 19th century	A pair of houses in a terrace, they are in stone with a stone slate roof. There are two storeys and a basement, and the windows are mullioned. On the left is a doorway in the basement, with a blocked doorway above with an inserted window, and the other doorway is in the lower floor and is approached by steps with railings.	II
6 and 8 Low Gate, Underbank; 53.56563°N 1.78116°W	—	Early to mid 19th century	A pair of mirror-image houses in stone with a sill band, a stone slate roof, two storeys, and mullioned windows. The doorways are in the centre and are flanked by three-light windows, and in the upper floor are six-light windows.	II
59 and 61 Sweep Lane, Underbank; 53.56310°N 1.78010°W	—	Early to mid 19th century	A pair of stone houses, with No. 61 rendered at the rear. They have a stone slate roof, three storeys, and mullioned windows. In the ground floor of each house is a doorway and a three-light window, a four-light window in the middle floor, and a six-light window with some blocked lights in the top floor.	II
57 Underbank Old Road, Underbank; 53.56360°N 1.78008°W	—	Early to mid 19th century	A stone house at the end of a terrace, it has a stone slate roof with a coped gable and a kneeler to the south. The doorway is to the right, and there is a three-light mullioned window in each floor.	II
12, 14, 16, 18 and 20 Holt Lane, Under Hill; 53.57240°N 1.78938°W	—	Early to mid 19th century	A group of houses with underdwellings, the building is in stone and has a stone slate roof with coped gables. There are three storeys at the front and four at the rear. Most windows are mullioned, there are some single lights, and some lights are blocked.	II
10, 12 and 14 Huddersfield Road, Upper Bridge; 53.56914°N 1.78974°W	—	Early to mid 19th century	A shop and two houses as part of a terrace, with underdwellings, they are in stone with moulded gutter brackets and a stone slate roof. There are two storeys at the front and four at the rear. On the front, on the left, is a shop front, to the right are two doorways, and in both floors are sash windows. At the rear are two sill bands, two doorways, and mullioned windows, including two nine-light windows in the top floor.	II
12 New Fold, Upper Bridge; 53.56903°N 1.78878°W	—	Early to mid 19th century	The house is part of a terrace, in stone and partly rendered, on a plinth, with quoins and a stone slate roof. There are three storeys and the windows are mullioned.	II
11 and 13 Upperthong Lane, Upper Bridge; 53.56909°N 1.79184°W	—	Early to mid 19th century	A pair of houses at the end of a terrace, they are in stone with a stone slate roof. There are two storeys, they contain two central doorways, one of which is blocked, and a later doorway to the left, and the windows are mullioned.	II
8 Town Gate, Upperthong; 53.57228°N 1.80638°W	—	Early to mid 19th century	A stone house at the end of a terrace, originally two houses, it has a stone slate roof, three storeys at the front and two at the rear. In the lower two floors at the front are sash windows, and the other windows are mullioned with a nine-light window in the top floor. At the rear is a nine-light window with some blocked lights, and single-light windows.	II
12 Town Gate, Upperthong; 53.57223°N 1.80663°W	—	Early to mid 19th century	Originally two dwellings, later combined into one, and the front modernised. It is in millstone grit with a stone slate roof and two storeys. At the rear is a doorway, mullioned windows, some single lights, and one 18th-century window.	II
Booth House, 24, 26 and 28 Booth House Lane; 53.56635°N 1.81047°W	—	Early to mid 19th century	A row of three houses in stone with a sill band, and a stone slate roof with coped gables. There are two storeys, each house has a doorway, and the windows are mullioned, with some blocked lights.	II
Cartref, Beyond the Sea, and adjoining property 53.58175°N 1.80341°W	—	Early to mid 19th century	A terrace of three stone houses with a stone slate roof. There are three storeys at the front and two at the rear. Each house has a doorway, and the windows are mullioned, with some mullions removed and some lights blocked.	II
Edge End (House to south); 53.56752°N 1.82686°W	—	Early to mid 19th century	A former weavers' house in stone and partly rendered, with two storeys at the front and one at the rear. There are doorways in the centres of the front and rear, and the windows are mullioned, with many lights blocked.	II
Hollin Greave Farmhouse and barn 53.58157°N 1.75824°W	—	Early to mid 19th century	The farmhouse and barn are in a single range, they are in stone with a stone slate roof and two storeys. The windows are mullioned with some blocked lights. The barn is to the right, in the front is a small doorway, and at the rear is a large central door with a lintel on rounded corbels.	II
Hollingreave; 53.58136°N 1.75867°W		Early to mid 19th century	A row of seven stone cottages that have a stone slate roof with coped gables. Most of the cottages have two storeys, and those to the right have three. Each cottage has a doorway and mullioned windows, with some lights blocked.	II
Hollingreave and barn 53.58111°N 1.75882°W	—	Early to mid 19th century	A farmhouse and barn in a single range, they are in stone. The farmhouse has a stone slate roof, two storeys, and mullioned windows with some blocked lights. The barn to the left has a slate roof with coped gables and carved kneelers. It contains a large central door with a round opening above.	II
Lower Woodhouse Farmhouse (north); 53.55474°N 1.80911°W	—	Early to mid 19th century	A stone house that has a stone slate roof with coped gables and carved kneelers. There are two storeys, a near-central doorway, and mullioned windows, with some missing mullions and some blocked lights.	II
Lower Woodhouse Farmhouse and barn (south); 53.55453°N 1.80939°W	—	Early to mid 19th century	The farmhouse and barn are in stone and have a stone slate roof with coped gables and carved kneelers. The house has two storeys, a near-central doorway, and mullioned windows, with some missing mullions and some blocked lights. The barn, which is at right angles, has segmental-arched cart entries at the front and the rear, the rear entry partly blocked.	II
Milestone north of Holmfirth; 53.58764°N 1.77632°W		Early to mid 19th century	The milestone is on the southeast side of Woodhead Road (A6024 road). It consists of a painted stone with a rounded top inscribed with the distances to Huddersfield and Woodhead.	II
Milestone southwest of Holmfirth; 53.56541°N 1.80254°W		Early to mid 19th century	The milestone is on the southeast side of Woodhead Road (A6024 road). It consists of a painted stone with a rounded top inscribed with the distances to Huddersfield and Woodhead.	II
Milestone, Holmbridge; 53.55625°N 1.82025°W		Early to mid 19th century	The milestone is on the southeast side of Woodhead Road (A6024 road). It consists of a painted stone with a rounded top inscribed with the distances to Huddersfield and Woodhead.	II
New Close Farmhouse; 53.57540°N 1.80888°W	—	Early to mid 19th century	A stone farmhouse with quoins, a stone slate roof, and three storeys. Most of the windows are mullioned, some lights have been blocked, and some windows have been enlarged.	II
New Hagg Farm; 53.58984°N 1.78673°W	—	Early to mid 19th century	A terrace of three weavers' houses, they are in stone with moulded brackets, and a stone slate roof with coped gables and carved kneelers. There are three storeys, and each house contains a doorway and mullioned windows with up to 14 lights.	II
New Row; 53.56945°N 1.78756°W	—	Early to mid 19th century	Part of a terrace with underdwellings, it is in stone and has a stone slate roof with a coped gable to the northeast. They are four storeys at the front and two at the rear. On the front are shop windows and single-light windows, and at the rear the windows are mullioned.	II
Royd Top; 53.56939°N 1.80409°W	—	Early to mid 19th century	A house, part of a group, it is in stone and has a stone slate roof with coped gables. There are two storeys and three bays. In the centre is a doorway, and the windows are mullioned. At the rear is a modern porch.	II
Sands Farmhouse and Barn; 53.58312°N 1.80128°W	—	Early to mid 19th century	The farmhouse and barn are in a single range and are in stone with a stone slate roof. The house has sill bands, three storeys, a symmetrical front of three bays, and a lean-to extension at the rear. In the centre is a doorway, and the windows are mullioned. The barn to the left contains a large doorway with an elliptical arch, and a keystone with a date and initials.	II
Sparth Top; 53.56607°N 1.82758°W	—	Early to mid 19th century	A terrace of stone houses with a stone slate roof, two storeys, and mullioned windows. On the front are doorways and porches, and the windows include one of twelve lights, and lights in other windows have been blocked.	II
1, 3 and 4 Long Ing and barn, Burnlee; 53.56417°N 1.80711°W	—	1837	A cottage and weaving sheds converted into cottages with an attached barn, they are in stone and have stone slate roofs with coped gables and kneelers. The cottages have three storeys and contain mullioned windows with some blocked lights and other alterations, and inserted doorways. The former threshing barn is at right angles, and contains a large segmental-headed entrance and various other openings.	II
Former Sunday School, Upperthong; 53.57419°N 1.81078°W		1837	The former Sunday school and school house, later used as a village hall, is in stone, and has a stone slate roof with coped gables. The school has one storey and the house has two. The school contains four round-arched windows with keystones and impost blocks. The third window is flanked by rusticated piers and has a pediment with an inscription and date in the tympanum. The house contains an entrance and single-light windows.	II
Troughs, Goose Green; 53.56850°N 1.78844°W	—	1838	A pair of stone troughs, one higher than the other, and feeding it. The troughs are in a recessed area of a dry stone wall under a lintel. Both troughs are inscribed with the date, and one also has initials.	II
St David's Church, Holmbridge; 53.55728°N 1.81891°W		1838–40	The chancel was added in 1885–87. The church is built in stone with a slate roof, and consists of a nave, a chancel with a vestry, and a west tower. The tower has four stages, diagonal buttresses, a clock face on three sides, and an embattled parapet with tall corner pinnacles.	II
Hinchcliffe Mill Bridge; 53.55970°N 1.81155°W	—	1839	The bridge carries Dobb Lane over the River Holme. It is in stone and consists of a single segmental arch. The bridge has a string course, a parapet with round coping, and a dated keystone.	II
Church of England School, Holmbridge; 53.55790°N 1.82169°W		1841	The school is in stone, and has a stone slate roof with coped gables and carved kneelers. There is one storey and a basement, and seven bays. The middle bay is gabled, and has a colonette in the apex. It contains a Tudor arched doorway with a moulded surround and a hood mould, and above it is an inscribed plaque. Each of the outer bays contains a two-light window with pointed arches and a hood mould.	II
Civic Hall, wall and piers 53.57242°N 1.78621°W		1842	The civic hall is in stone, with a moulded eaves cornice, a blocking course, and a flat roof, and is in Classical style. There are two storeys, and a front of five bays, the outer bays projecting forward. In each storey of each bay is a tall window, and the two entrances are on the insides of the projecting bays. The forecourt is enclosed by stone walls, and there are massive square end and gate piers in stone with moulded caps. Between the gate piers is an iron overthrow.	II
Lydgate Parsonage; 53.57869°N 1.76128°W	—	1842	The parsonage is in Jacobean style, and built in stone with quoins, and a stone slate roof with coped gables and carved kneelers. There are two storeys, a front of three bays, and a double-pile cross-wing at the rear. On the front are six-light mullioned and transomed windows in the ground floor, and three-light mullioned windows in the upper floor. In the right gable end is a two-storey canted bay window and a Tudor arched doorway.	II
St John's Church, Upperthong; 53.56903°N 1.79503°W		1846–48	The church, designed by Edwin Shellard in Gothic Revival style, is built in stone with slate roofs. It has a cruciform plan consisting of a nave with a south porch, a north transept, a south transept rising to a tower, and a chancel. The tower has three stages, a five-sided stair turret to the east, and an embattled parapet.	II
74 and 76 Woodhead Road, Burnlee; 53.56612°N 1.80065°W	—	Mid 19th century	A pair of houses with the gable end facing the street, they are in stone with a moulded eaves cornice, a blocking course, and a stone slate roof. There are two storeys and an attic, and three bays. In the centre of the front is a doorway with engaged columns and Ionic capitals, a fanlight, and an architrave with a frieze, a cornice and a blocking course. The windows are sashes. At the rear is a central doorway, single-light windows, and a round arched stair window.	II
119 Woodhead Road and warehouse, Hinchcliffe Mill; 53.56035°N 1.81106°W	—	Mid 19th century	The house with a warehouse at the rear are part of a terrace and are in stone with a stone slate roof. The front facing the road has one storey, and at the rear are three storeys. The windows in both fronts are mullioned. In the road front is a doorway and a two-light window. At the rear is a tunnel entrance, windows, and doorways with lintels on rounded corbels.	II
81 and 83 Huddersfield Road, Holmfirth; 53.57189°N 1.78651°W		Mid 19th century	A pair of mirror-image houses in stone with sill bands, a moulded eaves cornice, a blocking course, and a stone slate roof. There are three storeys and four bays. Steps with railings lead up to the central doorways that have semicircular fanlights, engaged Doric columns, a frieze, a cornice, and a blocking course. The windows are sashes, those in the ground floor in round-arched recesses.	II
4 Town Gate, Holmfirth; 53.56991°N 1.78601°W		Mid 19th century	A stone house with a dentilled eaves cornice and a hipped stone slate roof. There are three storeys and three bays. In the middle bay is a three-storey bow window, and each of the outer bays contains a doorway and sash windows above.	II
35 and 37 Dunford Road, Underbank; 53.56760°N 1.78228°W	—	19th century	A stone house with quoins, a moulded eaves cornice, a blocking course, and a hipped slate roof. There are two storeys, sides of three bays, and a single-bay extension to the east. In the centre is a doorway with engaged Doric columns, an entablature and a blocking course, and a semicircular fanlight, and the windows are sashes.	II
59 and 61 South Lane, Underbank; 53.56827°N 1.78152°W	—	Mid 19th century	A pair of stone houses with a stone slate roof and three storeys. The windows are mullioned, in the ground floor of each house is a doorway with a two-light window to the left, and in each upper floor is a six-light window, with some lights blocked.	II
13 New Fold, Upper Bridge; 53.56900°N 1.78886°W	—	19th century	A stone house, rendered on the south, with quoins and a stone slate roof. There are three storeys and a lean-to extension, and the windows are mullioned. In the ground floor are two two-light windows, and in each of the upper floors the windows have nine lights, with some lights blocked.	II
98 Cliff Road, Wooldale; 53.57820°N 1.77459°W	—	Mid 19th century	A stone house with a stone slate roof and a coped gable. There are two storeys and the windows are mullioned. In the ground floor is a porch and a four-light window, and the upper floor contains two two-light windows.	II
68 Town End Road, Wooldale; 53.57849°N 1.77370°W	—	Mid 19th century	A house in a terrace, it is in stone with a stone slate roof. There are two storeys, and the windows are mullioned with three lights each.	II
72 and 74 Wooldale Road, Wooldale; 53.57535°N 1.77041°W	—	Mid 19th century or earlier	A pair of stone houses with quoins, and a stone slate roof with coped gables and carved kneelers. There are two storeys nd two bays. In the centre is a later gabled porch, and in each floor are two three-light stepped mullioned windows.	II
Beech House; 53.57153°N 1.78688°W	—	Mid 19th century	A large detached stone house on a plinth, with a moulded string course, a moulded eaves cornice, and a hipped slate roof. There are two storeys and a symmetrical front of three bays. In the centre is a porch with square panelled columns, a frieze, a cornice, and a blocking course. It has a round-arched opening with a keystone and panelled spandrels, and the door has a semicircular fanlight. The porch is flanked by square bay windows, and the windows are sashes in architraves.	II
Bon Accord, Carrleigh and Carrfield Terrace; 53.57118°N 1.78779°W	—	Mid 19th century	A terrace of three stone houses with a moulded eaves cornice, a blocking course, and a slate roof with coped gables. There are two storeys and a symmetrical front of seven bays, the alternate bays projecting forward. The three doorways each has engaged columns, a full entablature, and a pediment, and the door has a semicircular fanlight. The windows are sashes in architraves, and at the rear are round-arched windows and four small dormers.	II
Railway Station Building, Holmfirth; 53.57315°N 1.78304°W		Mid 19th century	The stationmaster's house to Holmfirth railway station, it is in stone, partly rendered, with quoins, and a slate roof with gable copings on large kneelers. There are two storeys and an attic, and a front of three bays, the outer bays forming gabled cross-wings. The central bay is recessed, and contains a doorway with a Tudor arch and a hood mould, and above it is a gabled dormer. Each outer bay contains a six-light mullioned and transomed window in the ground floor, a cross window in the upper floor, and small single-light window in the gable apex. On the west front is a single-storey bay window.	II
The Cottage, Ox Lane; 53.58106°N 1.80369°W	—	Mid 19th century	The cottage, part of a farm row, is in stone, and has a stone slate roof with coped gables, and two storeys. Most of the windows are mullioned, some lights have been blocked, and some windows have been altered.	II
The Vicarage; 53.56993°N 1.78414°W	—	Mid 19th century	A large detached stone house with a string course, pilasters at the ends and between the bays, a moulded eaves cornice, and a hipped stone slate roof. There are two storeys, a symmetrical front of three bays, and a single-storey extension to the left. The central doorway has an architrave, a semicircular fanlight, and a small cornice, and the windows are sashes.	II
Ward Boundary Post opposite the junction of Burnlee Road; 53.56497°N 1.80340°W		Mid 19th century	The boundary post is on the southeast side of Woodhead Road (A6024 road), and marks the boundary between the wards of Holmfirth and Austonley. It consists of a stone post with a rounded top inscribed with a vertical line and the names of the wards, with some decoration at the top.	II
Ward Boundary Post opposite 224 Woodhead Road; 53.55575°N 1.82163°W		Mid 19th century	The boundary post is on the south side of Woodhead Road (A6024 road), and marks the boundary between the wards of Holme and Austonley. It consists of a shaped stone inscribed on the sides with the names of the wards.	II
Ward Boundary Stone 400 yards south of Smithy Place Lane; 53.59050°N 1.77389°W		Mid 19th century	The boundary stone is on the east side of Huddersfield Road (A6024 road), and marks the boundary between the wards of Honley and Holmfirth. It consists of a stone with a round top, inscribed at the top "BOUNDARY STONE", and below it is divided by a vertical line between the names of the wards.	II
Small Block, Yew Tree Mills; 53.56059°N 1.81268°W	—	Mid 19th century	The detached mill building is in stone, with modillion brackets on a string course to the gutter, and a stone slate roof with coped gables. There are two storeys and an attic. The east front is gabled, and contains a Venetian window in the apex. Below this is a three-light window and a double doorway approached by a flight of steps, and in the ground floor are three single-light windows. Along the sides are eight bays, multi-light windows on the south front, and a bridge link on the north front.	II
Clonlea; 53.55867°N 1.82190°W	—	1858	A detached house on a plinth, with rusticated quoins, a moulded eaves cornice, a blocking course, and a hipped slate roof. There are two storeys, and a symmetrical front of three bays. In the centre is a porch with Doric columns and pilasters, and a canopy with an entablature and blocking course, and the door has a semicircular fanlight. The windows have mounded surrounds, in the ground floor with canopies on carved consoles. On the left return is a canted bay window with a parapet.	II
Milepost, Upperthong; 53.56862°N 1.81010°W		Mid to late 19th century	The milepost is on the north side of Greenfield Road (A635 road). It is in cast iron on a stone post, and has a triangular plan and a curved top. On the top is "GREENFIELD & SHEPLEY LANE HEAD ROAD" and "UPPERTHONG", and on the sides are the distances to Holmfirth, Barnsley, Greenfield, and Oldham.	II
Milepost, Thongsbridge; 53.58133°N 1.77375°W		Mid to late 19th century	The milepost is on the south side of New Mill Road (A635 road). It is in cast iron on a stone post, and has a triangular plan and a curved top. On the top is "GREENFIELD & SHEPLEY LANE HEAD ROAD" and "WOOLDALE", and on the sides are the distances to Holmfirth, Barnsley, Denby Dale, and Cawthorne.	II
Milepost, Underbank; 53.56222°N 1.78075°W		Mid to late 19th century	The milepost is on the east side of Dunford Road (B6106 road). It is in cast iron on a stone post, and has a triangular plan and a curved top. On the top is "HOLMFIRTH ROAD" and "WOOLDALE", and on the sides are the distances to Holmfirth, Huddersfield, Sheffield, and Penistone.	II
Milepost, Hollowgate Bridge; 53.56941°N 1.78882°W		Mid to late 19th century	The milepost on the parapet of the bridge is in cast iron, and consists of a flat plate with a round top. In the top part is "GREENFIELD & SHEPLEY LAND HEAD ROAD" and "HOLMFIRTH", and in the lower parts are the distances to Barnsley, Denby Dale, Greenfield, Cawthorne, and Oldham.	II
Netherley House; 53.55481°N 1.82010°W	—	Mid to late 19th century	A large detached house, it is in stone with a moulded eaves cornice and a hipped slate roof. There are two storeys, and the doorway has square pilasters and capitals, a full entablature and a blocking course. The windows are sashes, and to the left is a two-storey bow window with a conical roof and a decorative wrought iron weathervane.	II
Ward Boundary Stone 50 yards to south of 103 New Mill Road; 53.58270°N 1.76102°W	—	Mid to late 19th century	The boundary stone is on the east side of New Mill Road (A616 road), and marked the boundary between the wards of Thurstonland and Fulstone. It consists of a stone with a triangular plan inscribed on the sides with the names of the wards.	II
Methodist Free Church, Wooldale; 53.57925°N 1.76963°W	—	1868	The church is in stone, with moulded brackets, and a stone slate roof with coped gables. On the ridge of the roof is a small cupola. There are two storeys, a gabled front with three bays, and sides of four bays. In the centre of the front is a doorway with a fanlight and a moulded cornice, and in the gable apex is an inscribed tablet. The windows each has two round arched lights with a simple foil above in an arched wood frame. In front of the church is a low wall with cast iron railings and gates.	II
Chimney, Yew Tree Mill; 53.56067°N 1.81201°W		1868	The mill chimney is in stone, and is octagonal and tapering. There are string courses at the bottom and near the top, and at the top is a cornice on large brackets.	II
Methodist Church, Netherthong; 53.58449°N 1.79178°W		1872	The former church is in stone with rusticated quoins, modillion brackets, and a slate roof. There are two storeys, a gabled front of three bays, and sides of four bays. In the centre of the front is a doorway with an architrave, a segmental-headed fanlight, and a small canopy on console brackets. Flanking the doorway are two round-arched windows with moulded imposts and keystones. Above the doorway is a triple round-headed window with an inscribed over-arch. Along the sides of the church are round-arched windows in the upper floor and segmental-headed windows in the lower floor.	II
Wall, gate piers and gates, Methodist Church, Netherthong; 53.58436°N 1.79164°W	—	c. 1872	The walls enclosing the churchyard are in stone with rounded coping. At the entrance are square stone gate piers with chamfered and pointed caps, and between them are iron gates.	II
Boundary Stone adjacent to 224 Woodhead Road; 53.55584°N 1.82162°W		Late 19th century	The stone is against a wall on the north side of Woodhead Road (A6024 road), and marked the boundary between two parishes. It has a triangular plan and a sloping top, and has inscriptions on the sides.	II
Boundary Stone opposite Post Office; 53.55751°N 1.81915°W		Late 19th century	The stone is against a wall on the southeast side of Woodhead Road (A6024 road), and marked the boundary between two parishes. It is an upright stone with a curved top and shaped sides, and has an inscribed vertical line and lettering.	II
Ward Boundary Stone opposite junction with Bradshaw Road; 53.58243°N 1.81470°W		Late 19th century	The boundary stone is on the north side of Wilshaw Road (B6107 road), and marked the boundary between the wards of Netherthong and Meltham. It consists of a stone with a rounded top, inscribed with a vertical tine and the names of the two wards.	II
181, 183, 185, 187, 189 and 191 Woodhead Road, Hinchcliffe Mill; 53.55908°N 1.81394°W	—	1886	A terrace of houses with underdwellings, they are in stone on a plinth, with quoins and a stone slate roof with coped gables. On the front facing the road are two storeys and three bays, three doorways, and sash windows. At the rear there are five storeys and a two-storey extension on the left. The doorway has a fanlight, and the windows in the top two floors have mullions.	II
Holmfirth Technical Institute; 53.57329°N 1.78498°W		1892–94	The building, on a corner site, is in buff sandstone with a roof of Welsh blue slate. The entrance front has two storeys and a basement, and seven bays, with a projecting plinth, moulded floor bands, and bracketed eaves. Three of the bays project and have stepped gables and ball finials. The main entrance has a segmental head, a moulded surround and an arched doorway with a fanlight. The windows are transomed, or mullioned and transomed, and on the roof is a cupola.	II
Lydgate Oliver Heywood Memorial Sunday School; 53.57856°N 1.76163°W	—	1910	The Sunday school was designed by Edgar Wood and James Henry Sellers and has Arts and Crafts features. It is in stone and has a flat roof and a parapet. There is a single storey, a bowed front, and sides of six bays. In the centre of the front is a door in a recessed porch with an architrave, and a tent gable above. Set back above this is a mullioned and transomed window, over which is an inscription and a decorative parapet.	II
The Picturedrome; 53.57021°N 1.78659°W		1912–13	A cinema in red brick, mainly rendered, with exposed brick pillars, and a slate roof surmounted by a louvre. The entrance front has two storeys, three bays, a band and a shaped gable. In the centre is a double doorway, above which is a balcony with a window and three blocked openings. The outer bays also contain windows, at the top of the brick pillars are semicircular caps, and in the apex of the gable is a date and a cartouche. Inside the cinema is a pressed tin ceiling.	II
Holme, Holmfirth and Newmill Memorial Cross; 53.57880°N 1.78368°W		1921	The cross is a war memorial in the grounds of Holme Valley Memorial Hospital. It is in granite, and consists of a Latin cross on an octagonal shaft with a moulded foot. Draped on the cross is a carved wreath, and on the shaft is a reversed sword in relief. The cross stands on a stepped octagonal plinth with an inscription, on an octagonal base. Behind the cross is a balustraded wall in York stone, the centre of which projects under a pediment with a broken cornice and contains an inscribed granite panel. The flanking wall contains granite panels inscribed with the names of those from Holmfirth and the surrounding districts and villages who were lost in the two World Wars.	II
Telephone Kiosk Outside Wooldale Methodist Chapel; 53.57626°N 1.77075°W	—	1935	A K6 type telephone kiosk, designed by Giles Gilbert Scott. Constructed in cast iron with a square plan and a dome, it has three unperforated crowns in the top panels.	II
