= Burnlee =

Coordinates: 53.564°N 01.807°W

- Location within West Yorkshire
- Population: 1,050
- OS grid reference: SE128074
- Metropolitan county: West Yorkshire
- Region: Yorkshire and the Humber
- Country: England
- Sovereign state: United Kingdom
- Police: West Yorkshire
- Fire: West Yorkshire
- Ambulance: Yorkshire

Burnlee is a village in the Holme Valley in Kirklees, West Yorkshire, England. It is bordered by the settlements of Holmfirth, Upperthong and Hinchcliffe Mill.

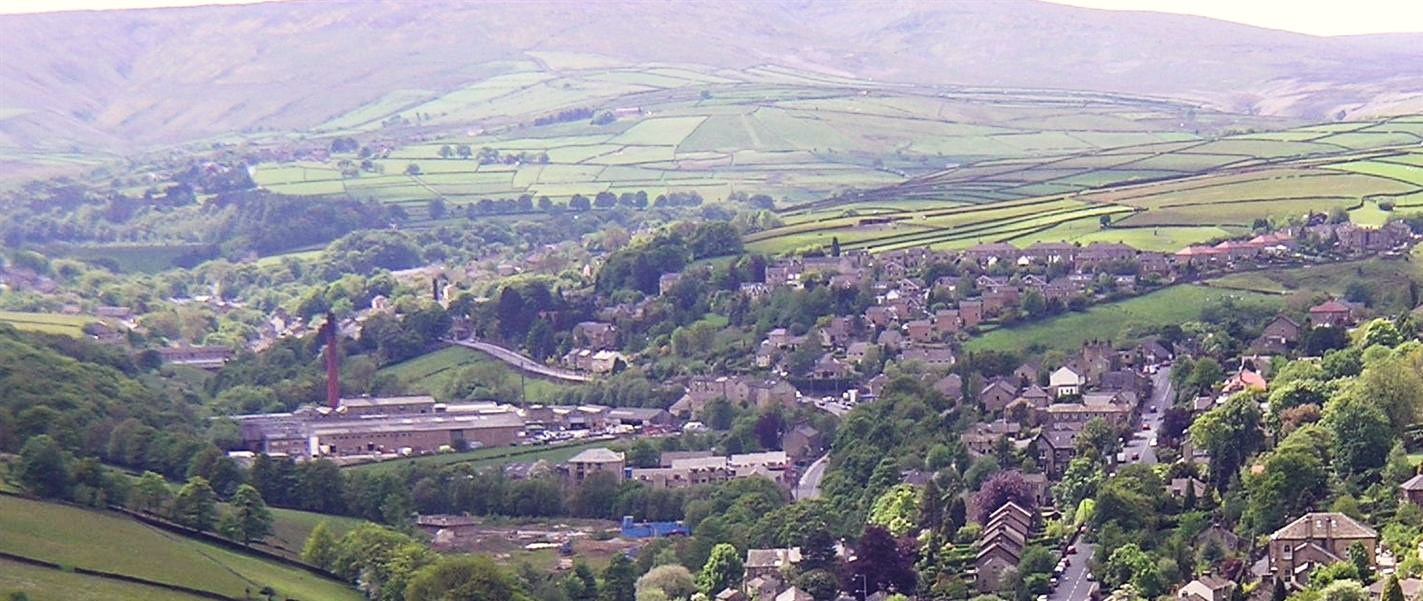
Burnlee Village viewed from Cliffe Lane, above Holmfirth
