= Aberford =

Village and civil parish near Leeds, West Yorkshire, England

Coordinates: 53.8304°N 1.3429°W

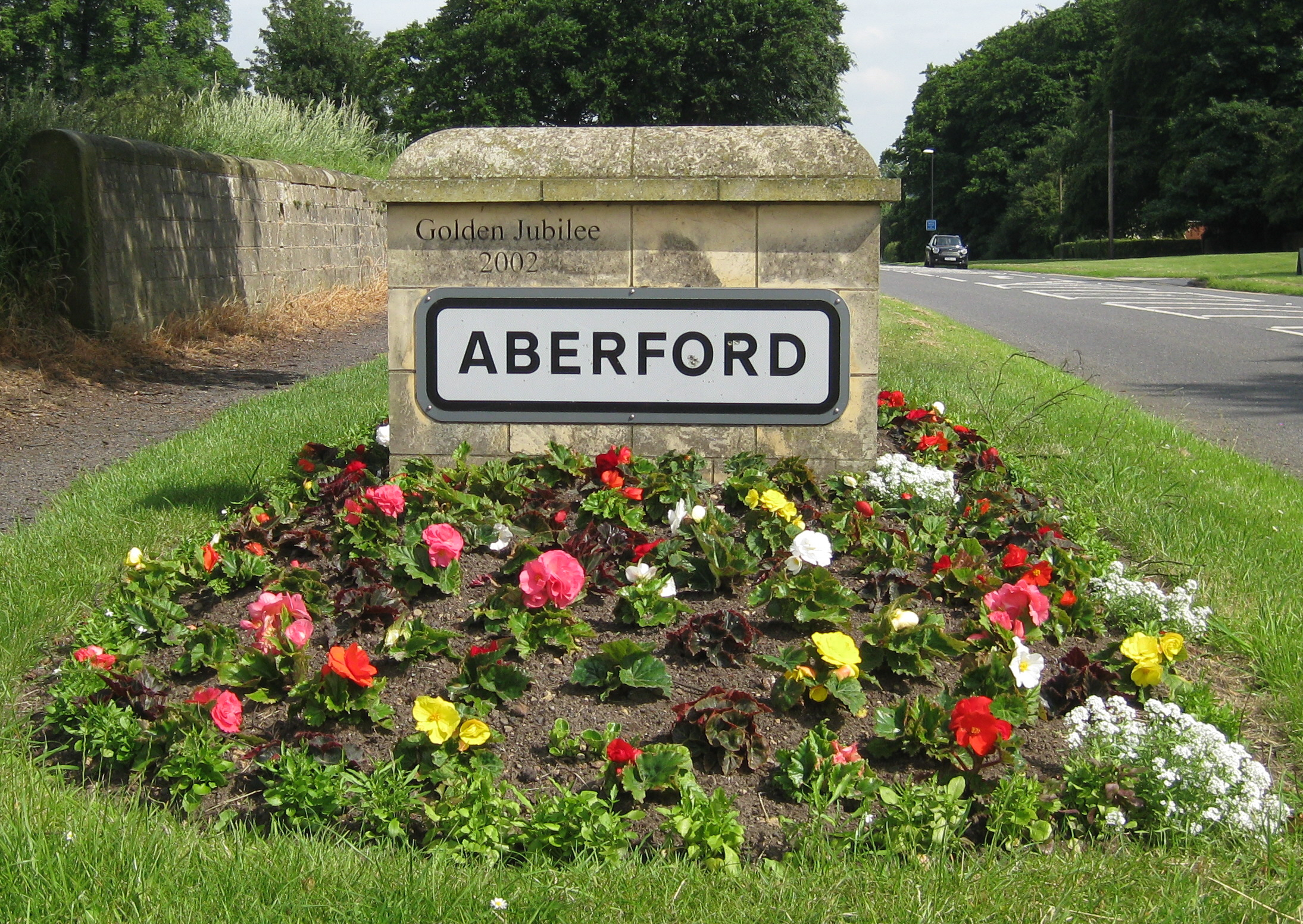
- Boundary marker

- Location within West Yorkshire
- Population: 1,180 (2011 census)
- OS grid reference: SE 434 373
  - London: 165 mi (266 km) SSE
- Civil parish: Aberford
- Metropolitan borough: City of Leeds
- Metropolitan county: West Yorkshire
- Region: Yorkshire and the Humber
- Country: England
- Sovereign state: United Kingdom
- Post town: LEEDS
- Postcode district: LS25
- Dialling code: 0113
- Police: West Yorkshire
- Fire: West Yorkshire
- Ambulance: Yorkshire
- UK Parliament: Wetherby and Easingwold

Aberford is a village and civil parish on the eastern outskirts of the City of Leeds in West Yorkshire, England. It had a population of 1,059 at the 2001 census, increasing to 1,180 at the 2011 Census. It is situated 10 miles (15.5 km) east, north east of Leeds and west of the A1(M) motorway.

== Etymology ==
The name 'Aberford' comes from the Old English woman's name Ēadburg and ford, which, then as now, meant 'ford'. The name meant 'Eadburg's ford'. This suggests the settlement's once-strategic importance. The name was recorded as Ædburford in 1176 and Ædburgford in 1177, Ebberford in the 13th century and Aberford from 1208.

== History ==
Aberford is where the ancient Great North Road crosses over the Cock River (now reduced in volume as the Cock Beck). Aberford was the midway point on the road between London and Edinburgh, being around 200 miles (320 km) distant from each city. The construction of the A1(M) motorway bypassed the village starting at Hook Moor. On the north side of the river the Aberford Dykes earthworks were constructed to defend the crossing. The buried remains of a Roman fort have been found beneath Aberford House. The bridge dates from the 18th century.

Aberford was in the ancient Kingdom of Elmet, the name given to the former parliamentary constituency. An Anglo-Saxon gold ring, inscribed with the name of King Alfred the Great's sister Æthelswith, was found in a ploughed field near the village in 1870. It was bequeathed by A. W. Franks to the British Museum in 1897. In the 17th century the village was a major place for the manufacture of pins.

Aberford's growth was along the road and the village has developed a linear rather than nucleated profile. Since the early 1990s much new housing has been constructed, as increasing affluence allows people to move away from city centres to rural and suburban areas.

Aberford adjoins the Parlington Estate, and was the northern terminus of the private Aberford Railway.

== Geology ==
Geologically, Aberford lies slightly east of the narrow basal sandstone boundary between the central Leeds Coal Measures and much harder magnesian limestone deposits, in an area shaped heavily by subsidence of the underlying Coal Measures.

== Buildings ==
Aberford is considered "a place of special architectural and historic interest". Some notable buildings are:

- St Ricarius Church. The parish church is an 1861 rebuilding of a 12th-century one.
- The Gascoigne Almshouses designed by George Fowler Jones was built by sisters Mary Isabella and Elizabeth Gascoigne of Parlington Hall in 1844 to commemorate their father, Richard Oliver Gascoigne and two brothers who died in quick succession. They are grade II* listed buildings.
- Aberford House is a classical 18th century mansion on Main Street.
- The Swan Hotel, previously a staging post used by those travelling the Great North Road.
- The Arabian Horse Inn is one of a very few public houses in the UK with this name, and a landmark with the conservation area.

Aberford Church of England primary School is affiliated with the parish church adjacent to it. The school was originally a tithe barn and is owned by the Archdeacon of York following its transfer from the Vicar of Aberford. Previously, it and much of the village was owned by Oriel College, Oxford, which received tithes from Aberford. At the northern boundary is the A64 road from Leeds to York and Scarborough. At the south end of Aberford is what used to be Hicklam Mill Farm now a small certified caravan and camping site.

== Gallery ==
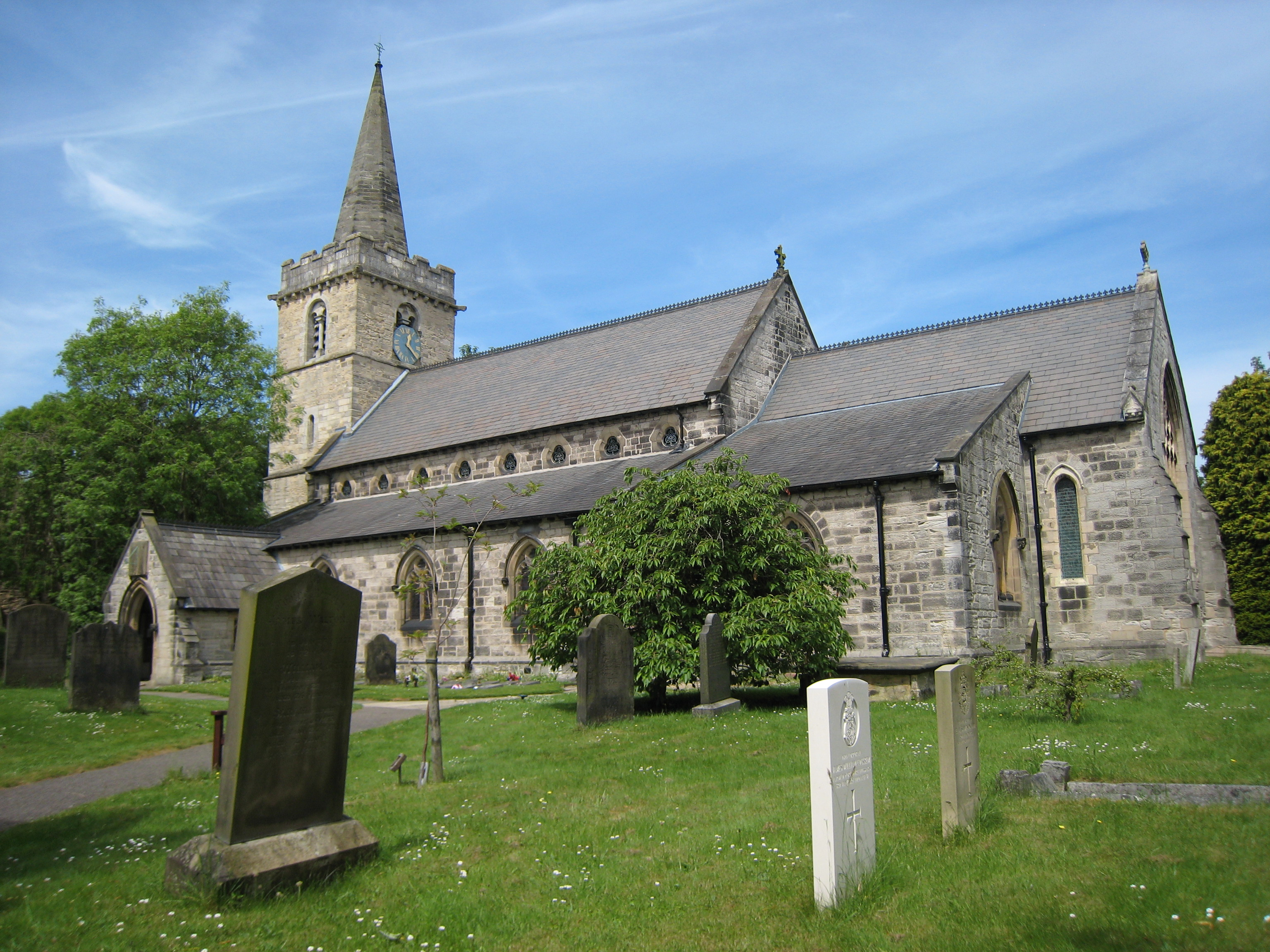
St Ricarius Church

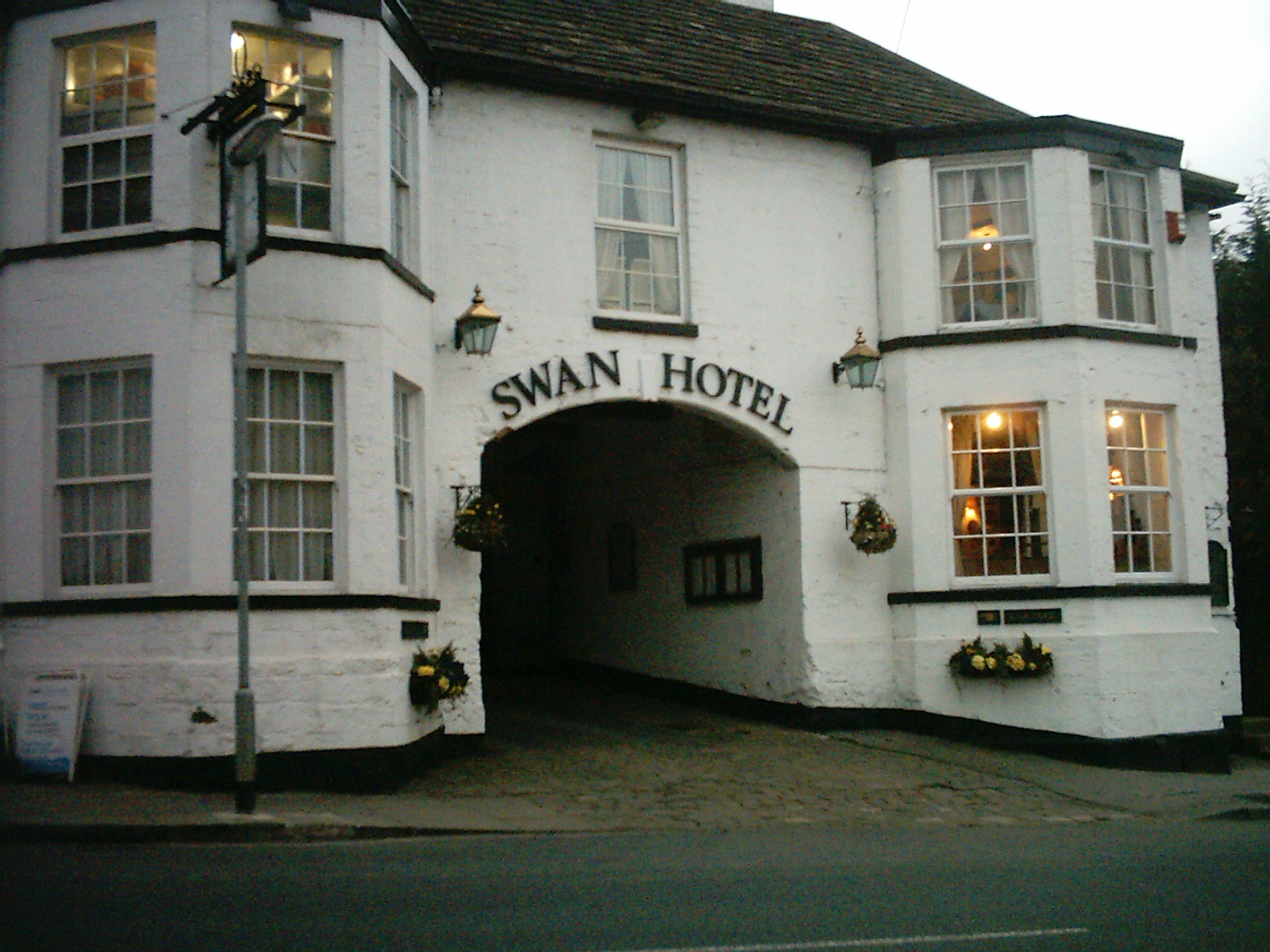
The Swan a former public house

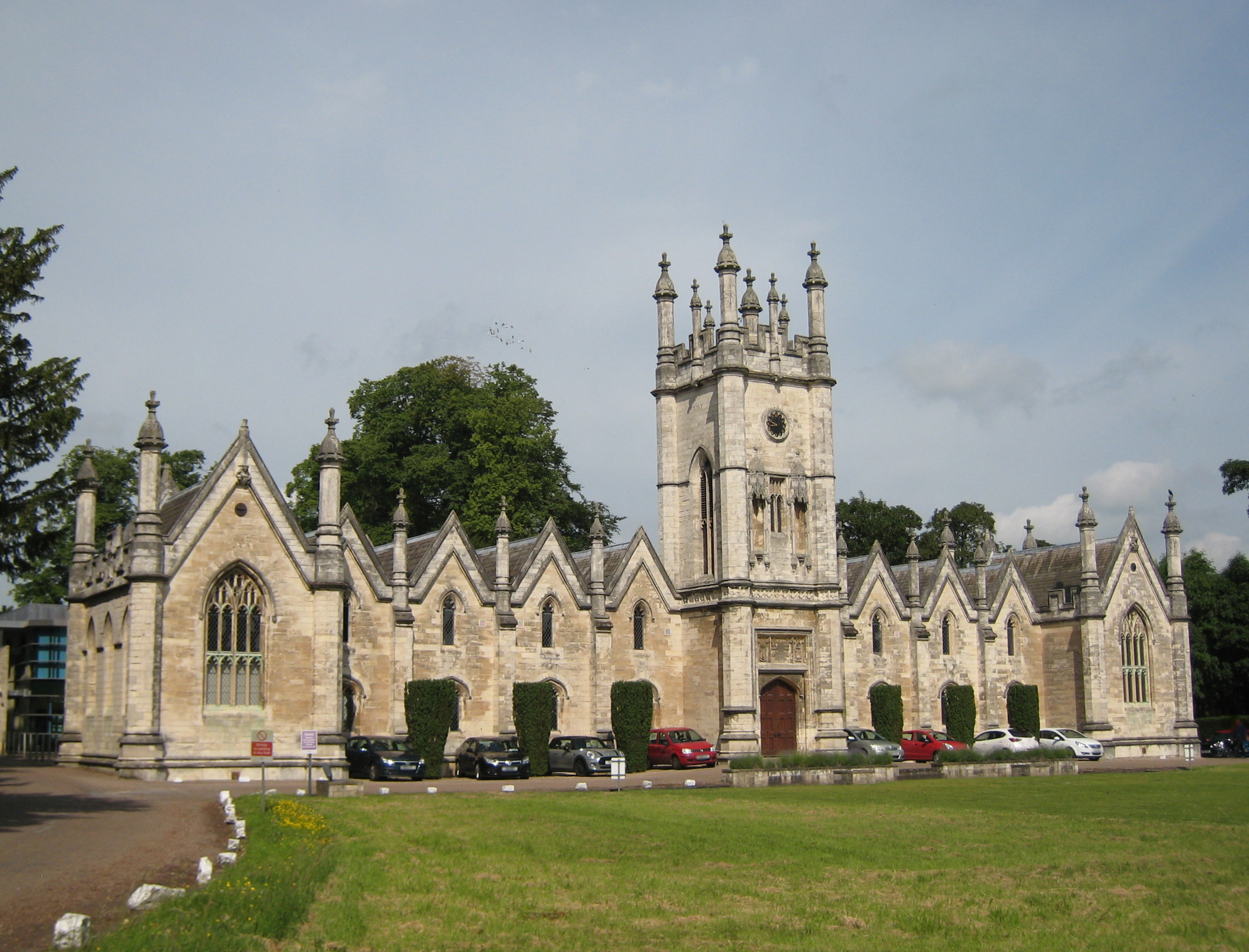
Gascoigne Almshouses

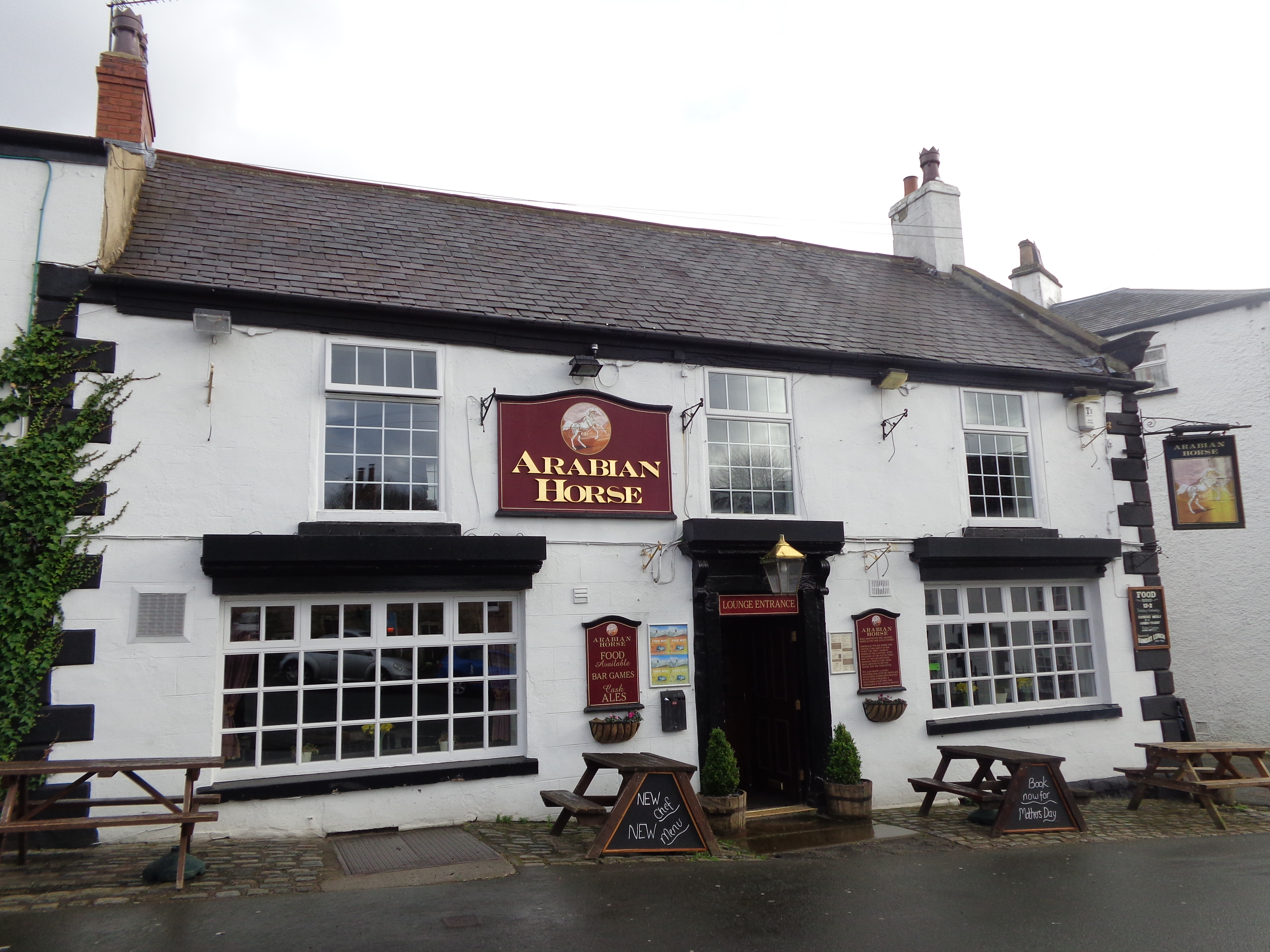
The Arabian Horse public house

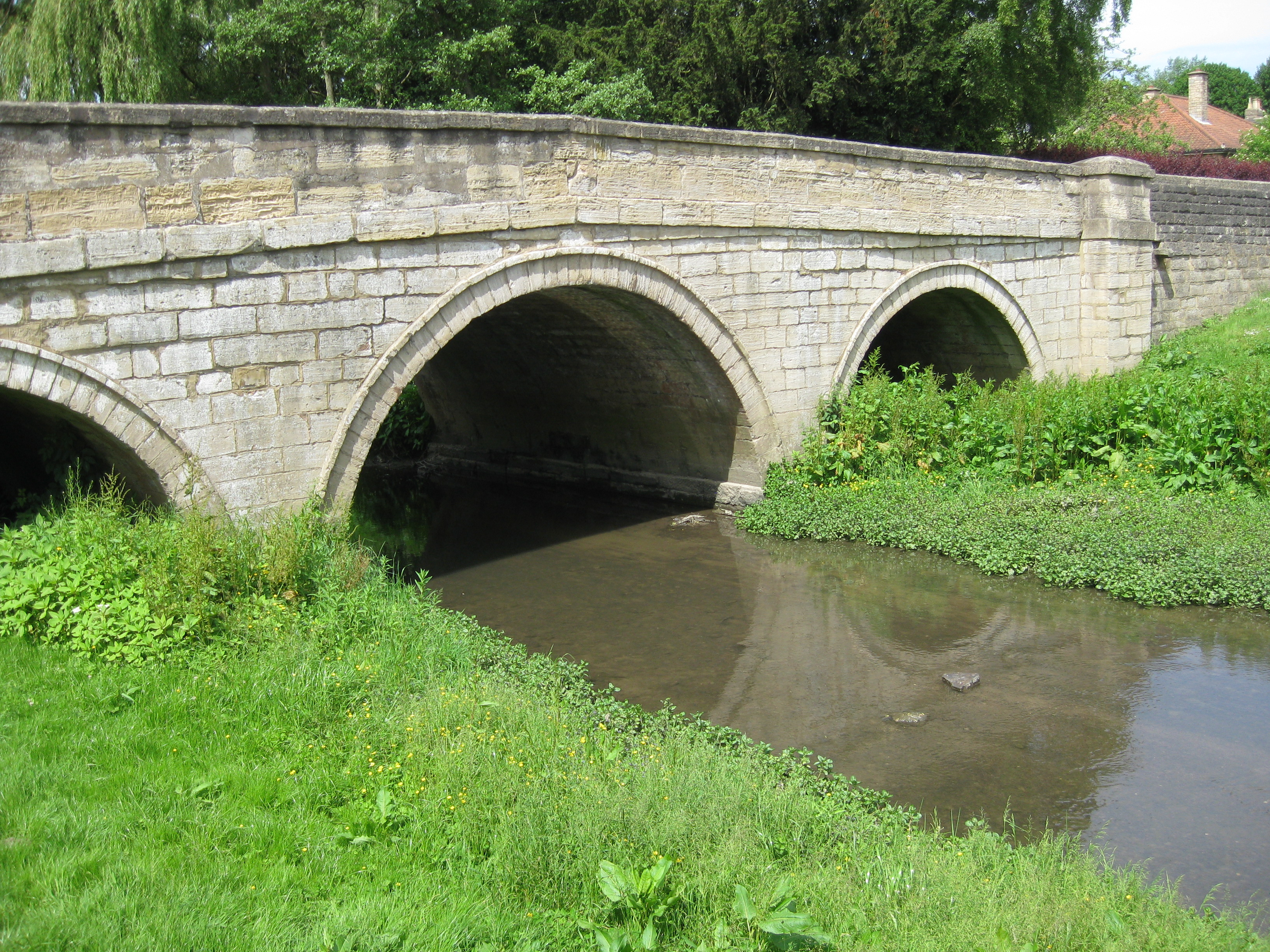
Aberford Bridge over the Cock Beck. The arches show the former width

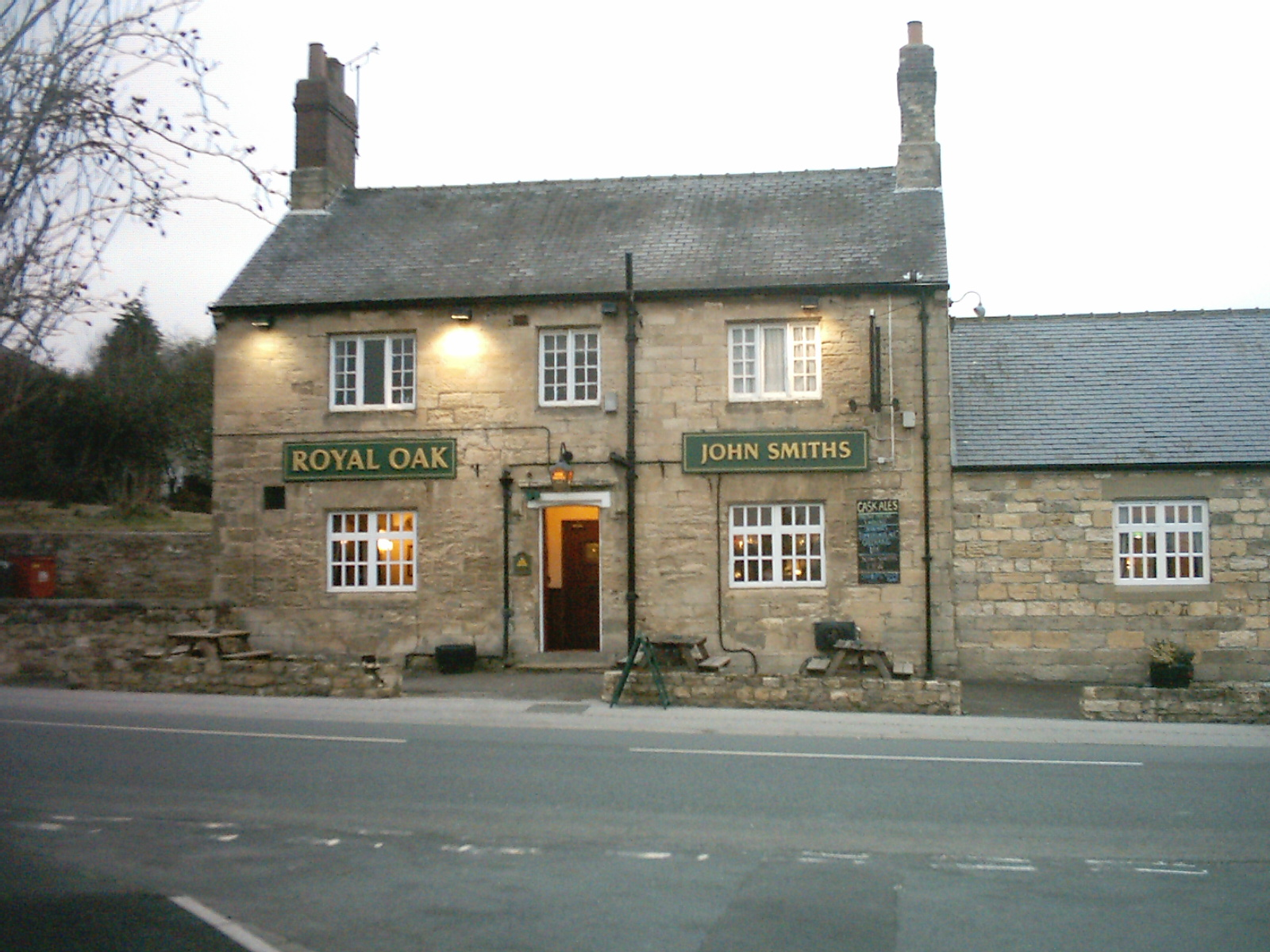
The Royal Oak a former public house

== See also ==
- Listed buildings in Aberford
