= St Ricarius Church, Aberford =

Anglican church in Aberford, West Yorkshire, England

- Church of St Ricarius or St Riquier
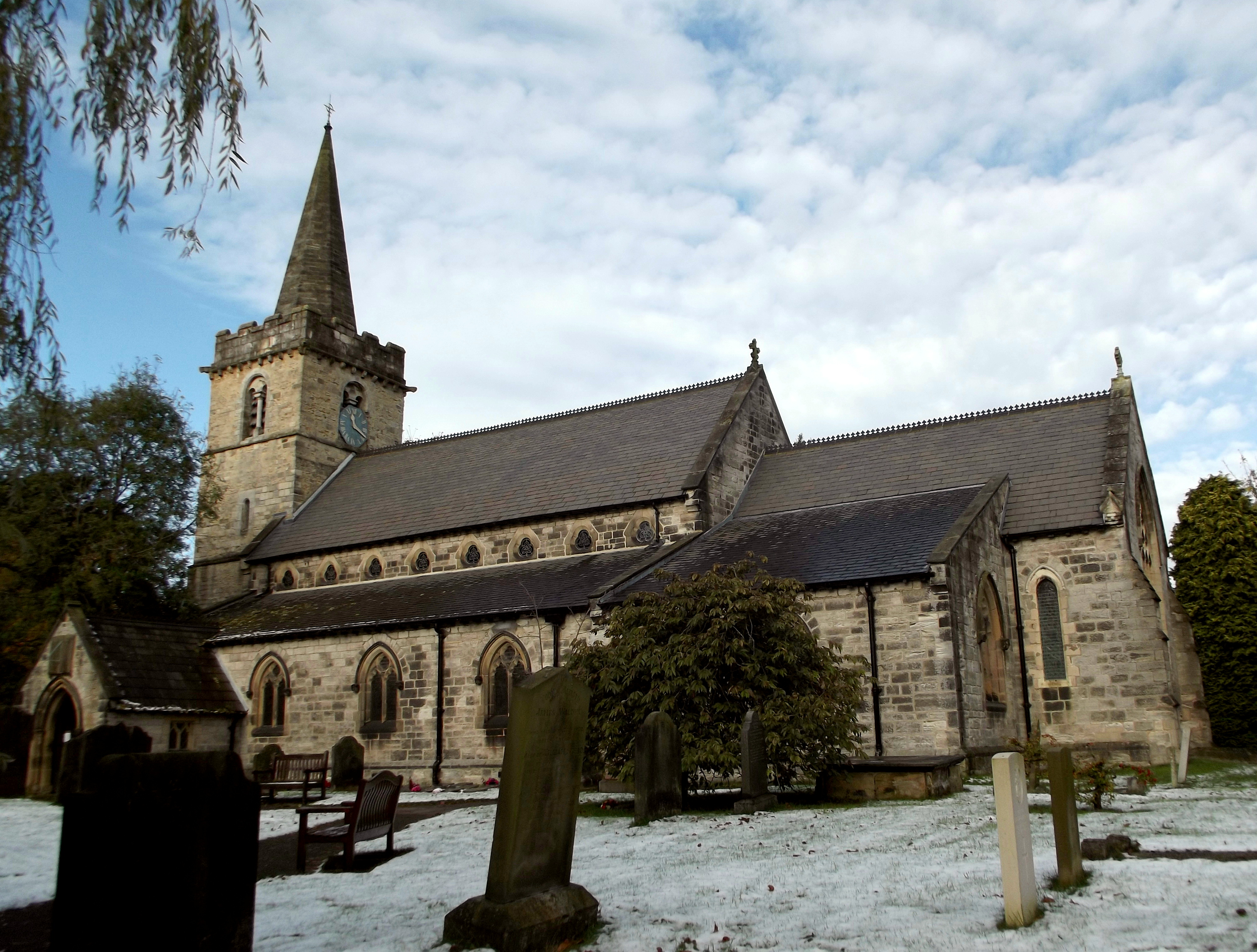
- St Ricarius Church, Aberford
- 53.828854°N 1.343817°W
- OS grid reference: SE 43288 37153
- Location: Aberford, West Yorkshire
- Country: England
- Denomination: Church of England

History
- Status: Parish Church

Architecture
- Heritage designation: Grade II listed building
- Architect: Anthony Salvin
- Completed: 1861

Specifications
- Materials: Magnesian limestone

Administration
- Province: York

The Church of St Ricarius, Aberford, West Yorkshire, England, is an active Anglican parish church in the archdeaconry of York and the Diocese of Leeds. It is commonly stated that the dedication refers to the French saint St Richarius or Riquier who is supposed to have visited Aberford in 630. However, the church itself has a stained glass window depicting "Ricarius Rex 720" (King Richard) the Saxon King also known as St Richard the Pilgrim.

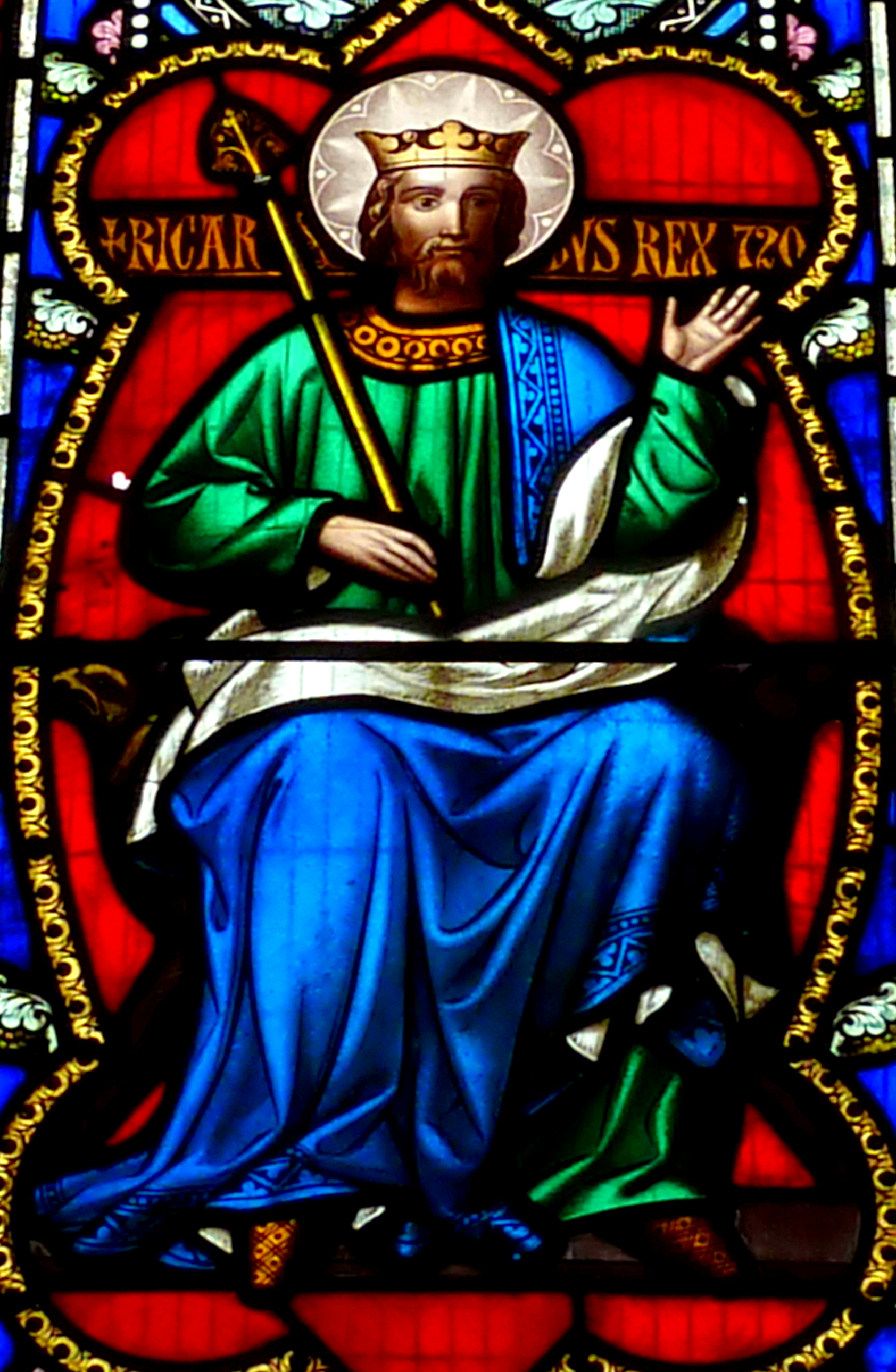
Ricarius Rex window

== History ==
Apart from the Norman tower, one Norman window and a 13th-century window, the church is largely an 1861 rebuilding of a 12th-century church by Anthony Salvin. The church was listed as a grade II listed building on 3 February 1967.

== Architectural style ==
=== Exterior ===
The church is of magnesian limestone with a slate roof. The west tower has a short octagonal spire and copies the style of the former tower: it has three stages with a rubble base and from there up is of squared masonry. The belfry has Norman-style round-headed belfry windows on all sides of the third stage and a clock face on the eastern side. There is a nave with both north and south aisles and a gabled porch to the south aisle. The church has a north vestry and a small chancel with south chapel. The chapel has a small priest's door and window. The porch has a sundial dating from 1806.

=== Interior ===
The church has four-bay arcades with double-chamfered arches and short cylindrical columns. The chancel arch has a 20th-century figurative painting. There is a two-bay arcade on either side of the chancel and on the north side a Norman lancet, perhaps relocated from the previous church. The church contains the anvil of blacksmith Samuel Hick, who is buried outside. There is an octagonal stone font with an ornate carved wooden cover.

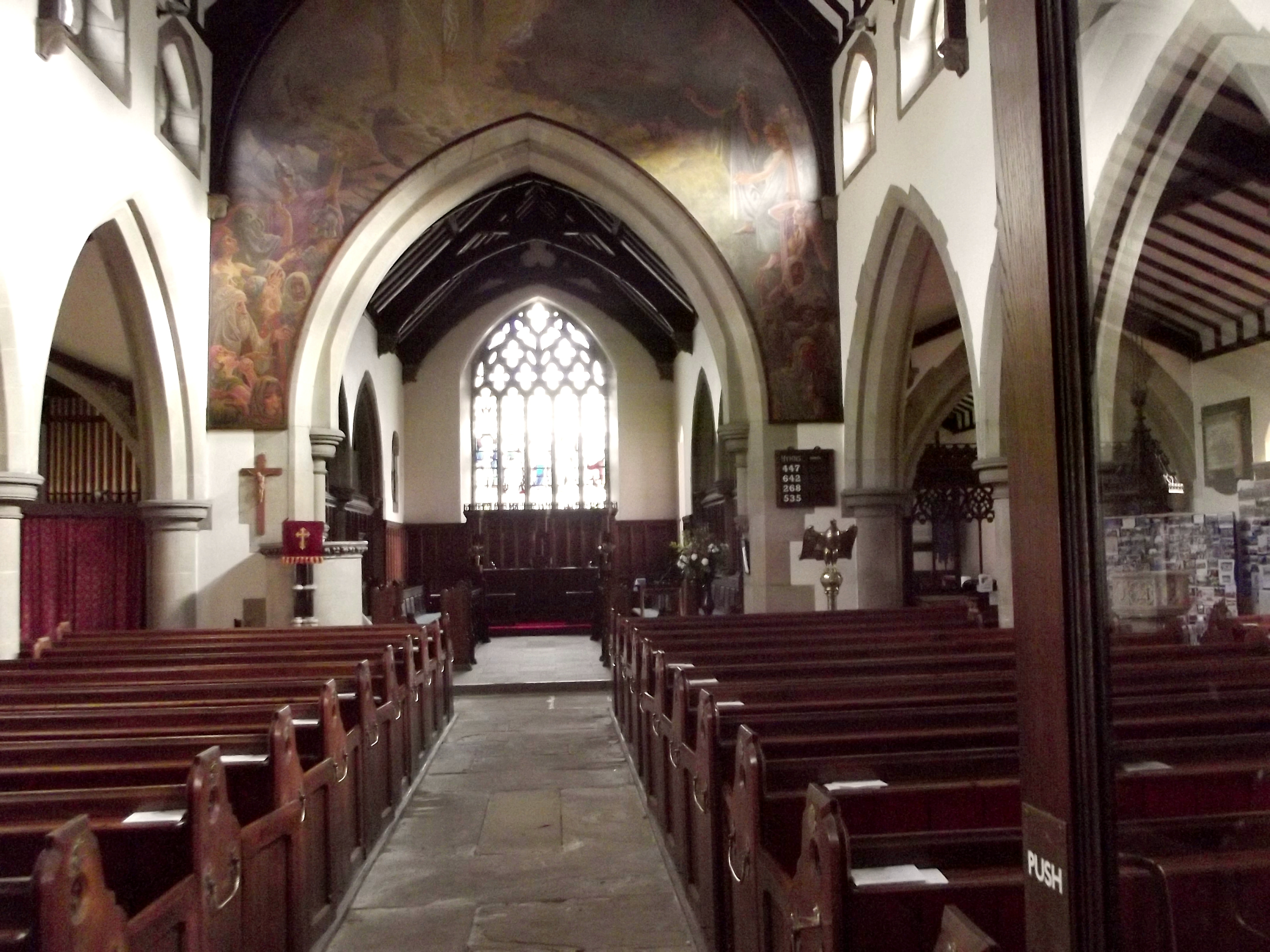
Interior

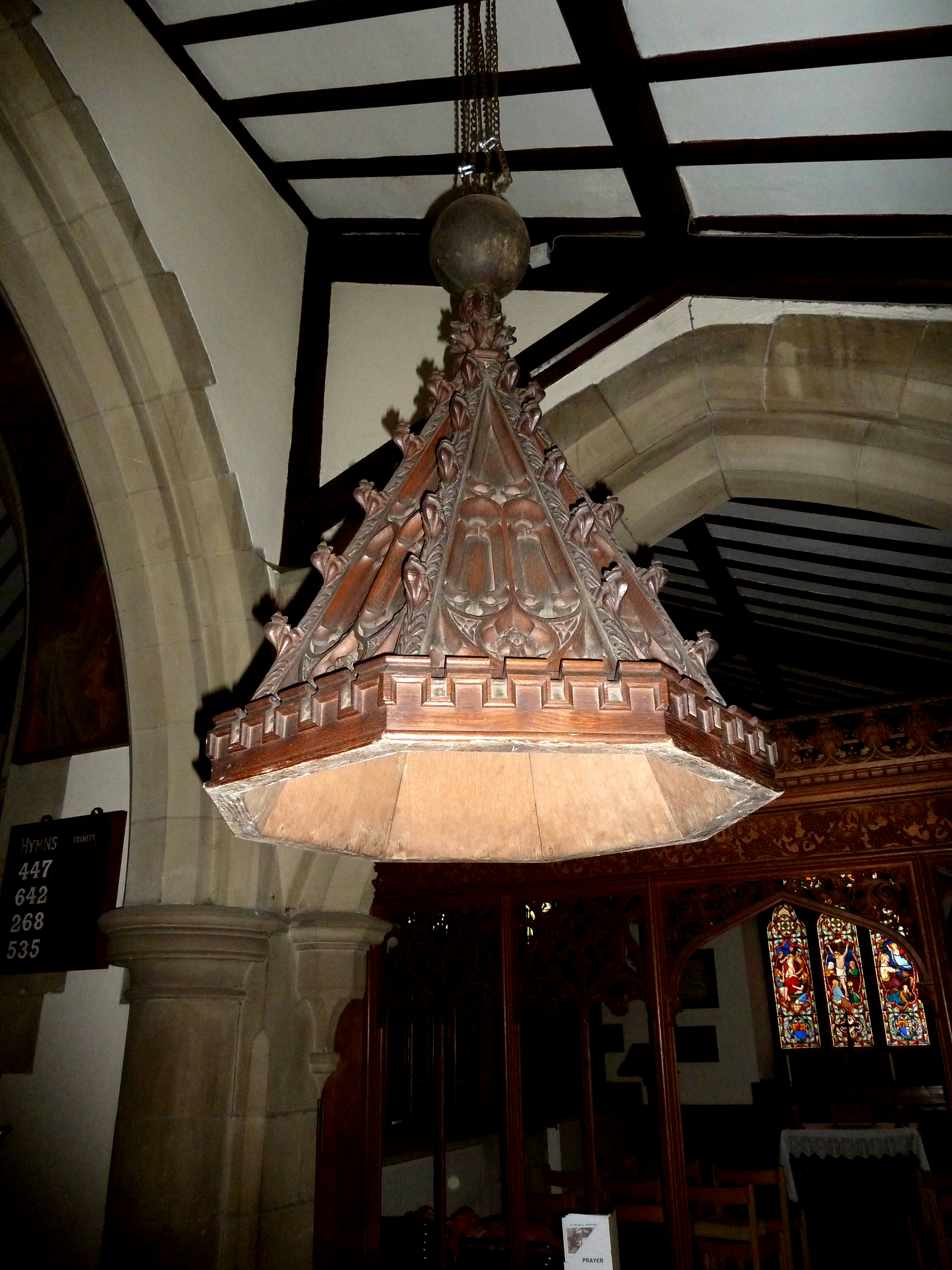
Carved wooden cover over the font

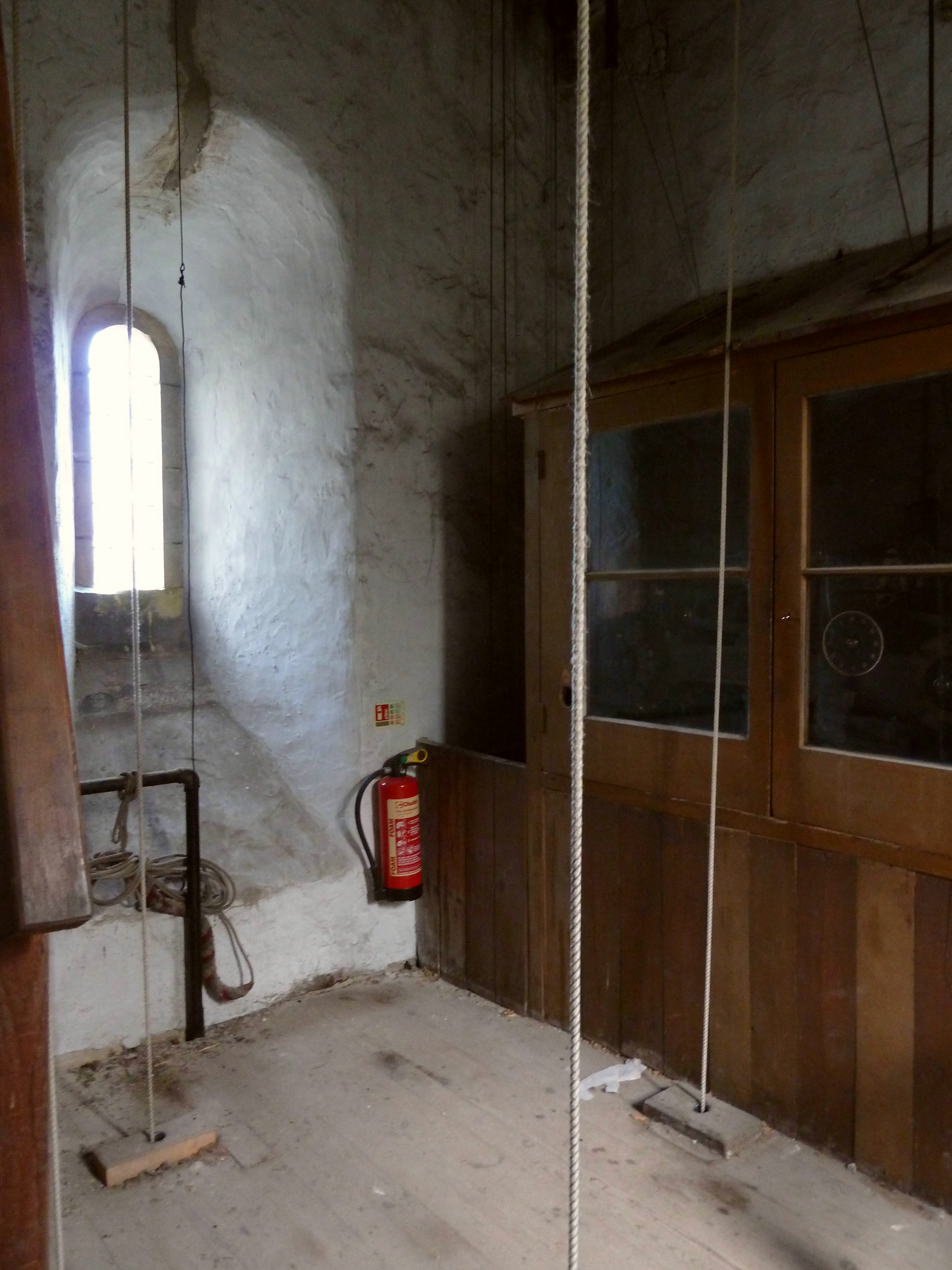
Clock chamber

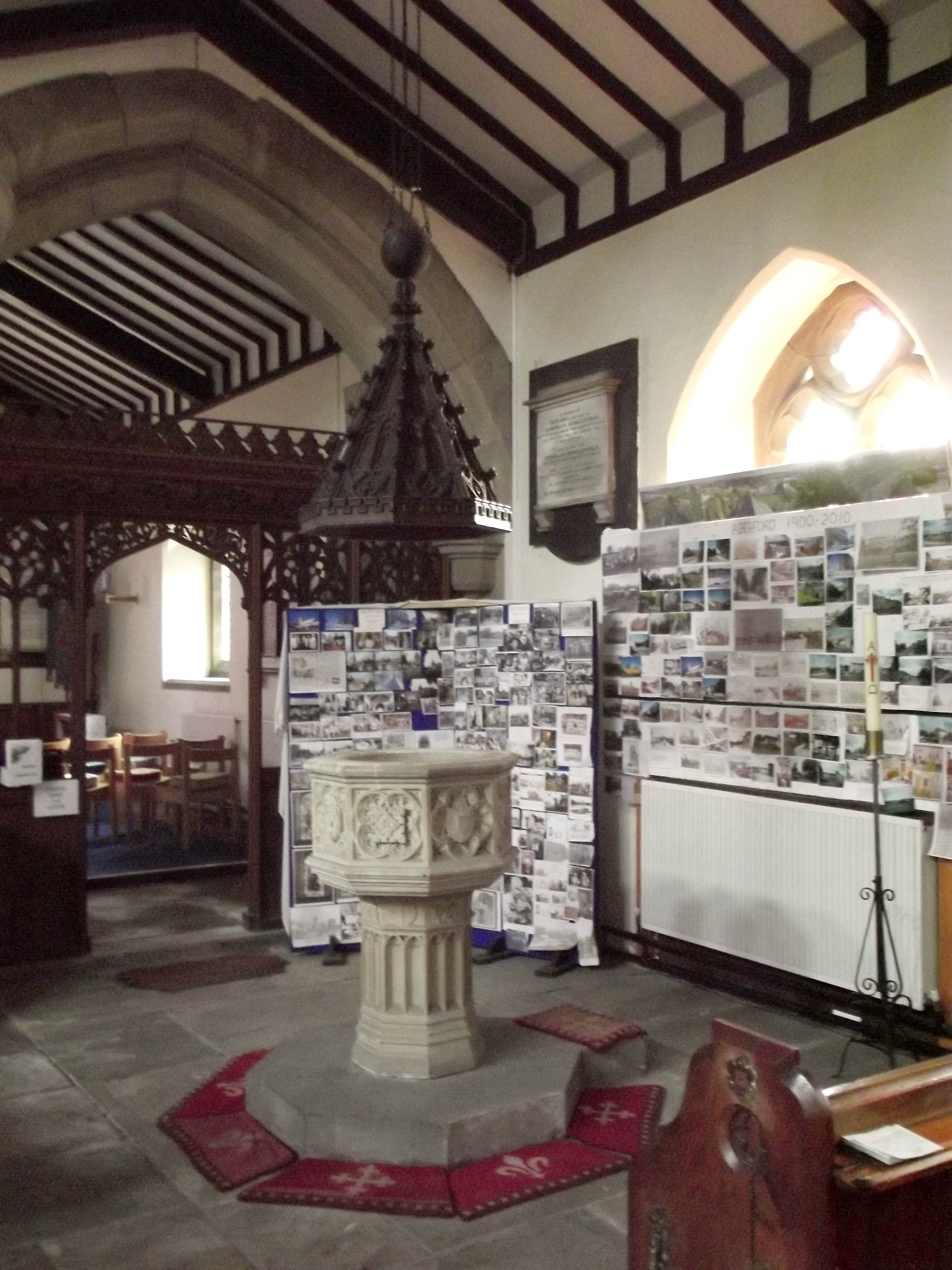
Font and cover

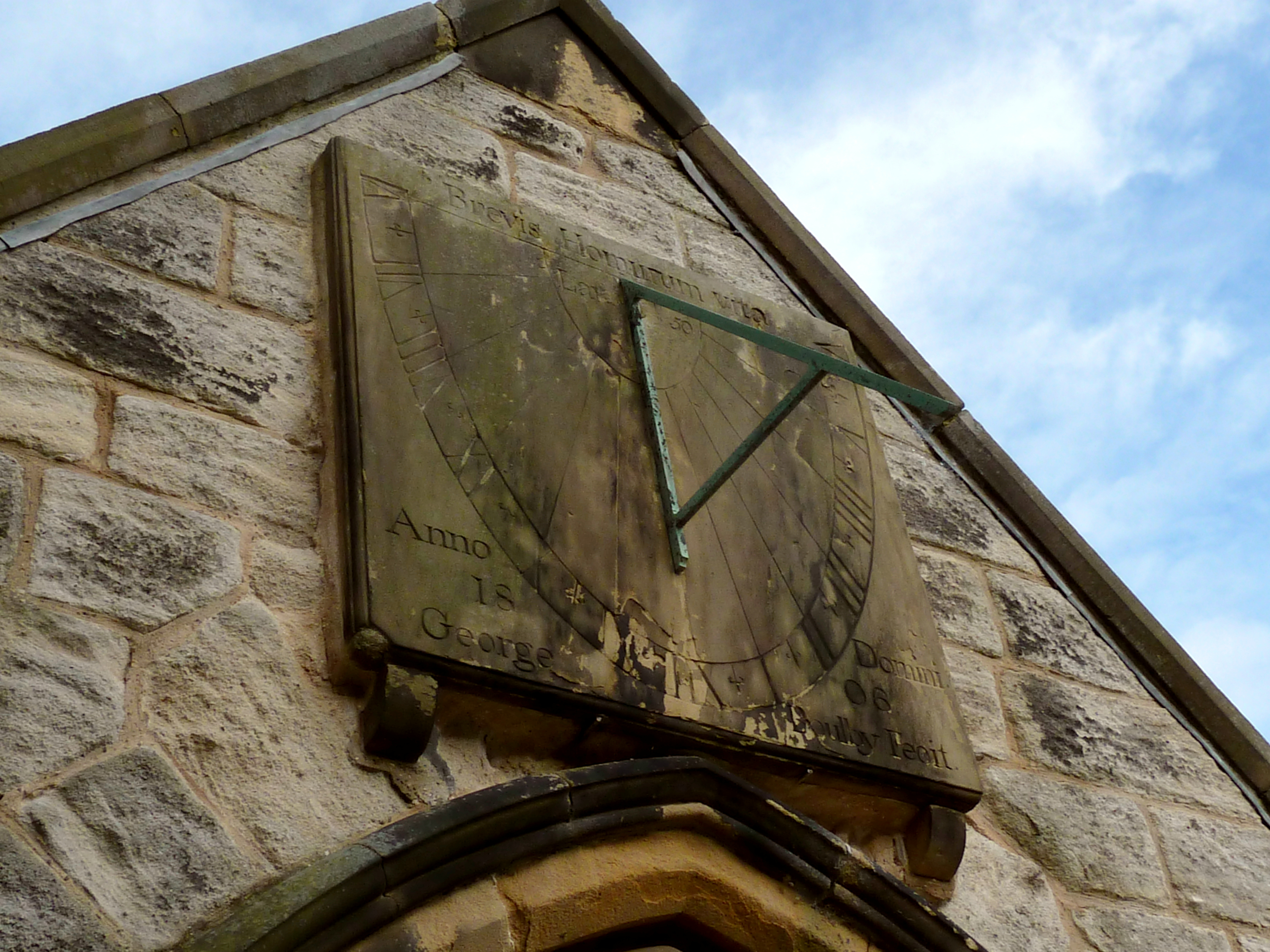
Sundial over porch

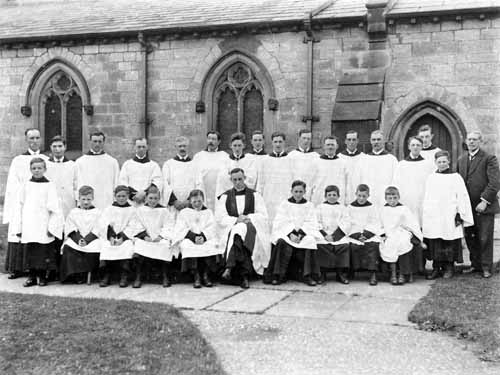
The choir at the church in the early 20th century

== Market Cross ==
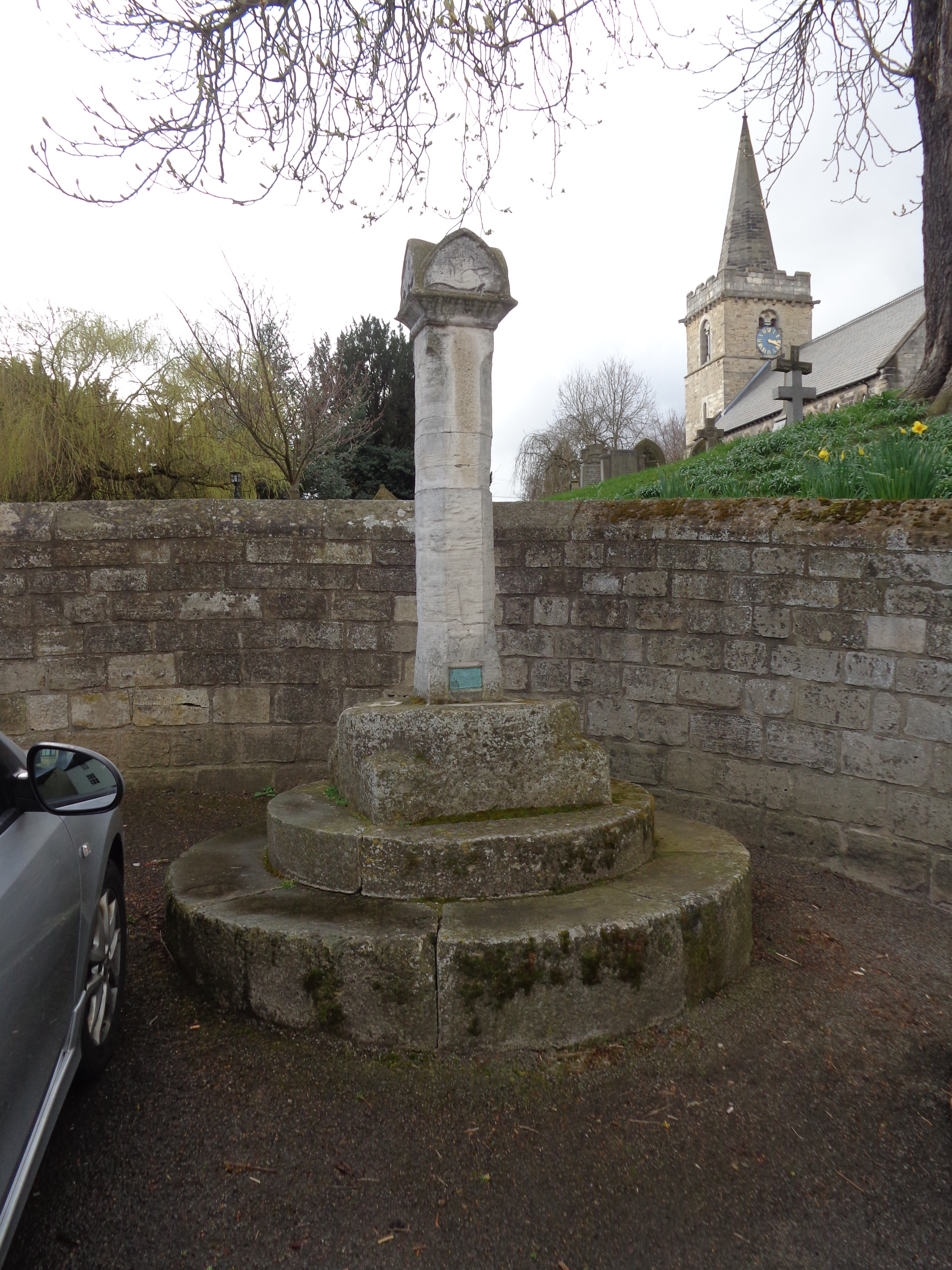
Market Cross at the church

Outside the church's south gate is a former market cross thought to be of 17th-century origin which was relocated here in 1911. Like the church the cross is of magnesian limestone. The cross has two circular steps and a stone pedestal and octagonal plinth. There is a lettered brass plaque claiming the cross was removed during the plague in 1644 and restored and relocated to commemorate the coronation of King George V in 1911.

== See also ==
- List of places of worship in the City of Leeds
- Listed buildings in Aberford
