= Listed buildings in Aberford and Lotherton =

Aberford and Lotherton cum Aberford are adjacent civil parishes in the metropolitan borough of the City of Leeds, West Yorkshire, England. The parishes contain 25 listed buildings that are recorded in the National Heritage List for England. Of these, one is listed at Grade II*, the middle of the three grades, and the others are at Grade II, the lowest grade. The parishes contain the village of Aberford and the surrounding countryside, including the area around Lotherton Hall. Most of the listed buildings are houses and cottages, and the others include churches, a market cross, a former water mill and a former windmill, a bridge, farm buildings, a hotel and a former stable block, a war memorial, and three milestones.

== Key ==
| Grade | Criteria |
|---|---|
| II* | Particularly important buildings of more than special interest |
| II | Buildings of national importance and special interest |

== Buildings ==
| Name and location | Photograph | Date | Notes | Grade |
|---|---|---|---|---|
| Church of St Ricarius; 53.82888°N 1.34388°W | | 12th century | The oldest part of the church is the tower, the rest was rebuilt in 1861–62 by Anthony Salvin. The tower is built in magnesian limestone, the rest is in sandstone, and the roofs are slated. The church consists of a nave with a clerestory, north and south aisles, a south porch, a chancel with a north vestry and a south chapel, and a west tower. The tower has three stages, round-headed lancet windows on the lower stages, larger round-headed windows in the bell stage, with a clock face on the east side, a corbel table with corner gargoyles, an embattled parapet, and a short recessed octagonal spire. The porch is gabled and has a sundial above the outer doorway, and the east window has five lights. | II |
| Lotherton Chapel; 53.81868°N 1.31893°W | | Late 12th century (probable) | The chapel is in magnesian limestone with a stone slate roof, and consists of a nave and a short chancel. In the north wall is a round-arched doorway with a moulded surround, and square recessed jambs with stiff-lead capitals, and in the south wall is a round-arched doorway with a plain surround. To the right of this doorway is a Norman round-headed lancet window, and there are two more Norman windows elsewhere. On the west gable is a gabled bellcote, and in the chancel is a blocked priest's door. | II* |
| Lotherton Hall Cottage and Lotherton Old House; 53.81896°N 1.31944°W | — | Early 17th century (probable) | A farmhouse in two builds, later divided, it is in magnesian limestone, with quoins and stone slate roofs. There is an L-shaped plan, one range with two storeys and three bays, and the other with two storeys and an attic and two bays, and at the rear is a gabled stair turret. Most of the windows are mullioned and some are sashes. | II |
| Market Cross; 53.82863°N 1.34325°W | | 17th century (probable) | The market cross was restored and moved to its present site in 1911. It is in magnesian limestone, and has two circular steps, a square pedestal brought to an octagon, a shaft with chamfered corners, and a moulded square cap. There is carving on each face of the cap, and set into the bottom of the shaft is an inscribed brass plaque. | II |
| Aberford House, wall, gatepiers, parterre and steps 53.82897°N 1.34285°W | | 18th century | The house is in magnesian limestone, with rusticated quoins, a sill band, a modillion cornice, a partly balustraded parapet and a hipped stone slate roof. There are two storeys, and an L-shaped plan with a front of five bays, and a rear wing with a service extension. On the front are two doorways, each with an architrave, a fanlight, and a pediment on consoles. The windows are sashes with architraves. At the rear is a two-storey canted bay window, and in the service extension is a Venetian window. In front of the house is a paved parterre with steps leading up to the house and a garden wall with banded gate piers. | II |
| Hicklam House; 53.82069°N 1.34278°W | | Mid 18th century (probable) | The front of the house is in brick with limestone dressings, and the rear wall is in limestone. The house has a hipped slate roof, a plinth, rusticated quoins, a sill band, and a modillion cornice. There are three storeys, and three bays on the front and sides. In the centre is a flat-roofed porch with clasping pilasters, a cornice, and a low parapet, and the windows are sashes with triple keystones. On each side is a semicircular bay window. | II |
| Hicklam Mill; 53.81785°N 1.34142°W | — | 18th century (probable) | The tower mill, now disused, is in limestone, it is tapering and has a circular plan. There are four stages, including a basement. The mill contains segmental-headed doorways and small windows, and the superstructure is missing. | II |
| Jessamine; 53.83129°N 1.34299°W | | 18th century | A house in painted rendered magnesian limestone with a pantile roof. There are three storeys and two bays. The doorway has a rusticated surround of long-and-short vermiculated and moulded masonry, and a triple keystone. The windows are small-pane casements, those in the lower two floors with keystones. | II |
| Manor Farmhouse; 53.82773°N 1.34295°W | | 18th century | The house is in magnesian limestone, the rear wall is partly in rendered brick, and the roof is in Welsh slate. There are three storeys, a symmetrical front of seven bays, and at the rear is an outshut and a short wing. In the centre is an elliptical-headed carriage entrance with voussoirs and a pendant keystone. In the lower two floors are sash windows with keystones, and in the top floor some windows are top-hung casements, and others are fixed. | II |
| Aberford Bridge; 53.83046°N 1.34285°W | | Late 18th century (probable) | The bridge carries Main Street over Cock Beck, and is built in squared magnesian limestone. It consists of three segmental arches, and has slightly recessed voussoirs, bands, a plain string course, a coped parapet, and projecting end piers. | II |
| Barn or coach house and stable range, Beckside Farm; 53.83009°N 1.34187°W | — | Late 18th century (probable) | The building is in sandstone with a hipped stone slate roof. There are two storeys and seven bays, the middle bay taller and projecting. In the middle bay is an elliptical-headed wagon entry, over which is an eaves band, an oculus, and a pyramidal roof. In the adjacent bays are round-arched doorways, and elsewhere are square windows. | II |
| Church House; 53.82868°N 1.34444°W | — | Late 18th century | The house has been extended on both sides, and divided. It is in magnesian limestone with quoins, and a tile roof with coped gables and kneelers. There is a double-depth plan. The original part has three storeys and a symmetrical front of three bays. It has a Tuscan porch and a doorway with a moulded surround, above which war two round-headed windows, and the other windows are sashes. The extension to the right has three storeys and one bay, and the left extension has two storeys under the same roof, two bays, and a doorway with columns and a cornice. | II |
| Field House; 53.83203°N 1.34220°W | | Late 18th century | A house in magnesian limestone, partly rendered, with a band, a moulded cornice, a low parapet, and a stone slate roof with coped gables. There are two storeys and a symmetrical front of three bays. At the top is a pediment containing an oeil-de-boeuf window. In the centre is a round-headed arch containing a doorway with a moulded surround, imposts and a fanlight, and the windows are sashes. | II |
| The Swan Hotel; 53.82939°N 1.34326°W | | Late 18th century | A coaching house, later a public house and hotel, it is in painted stuccoed stone with a stone slate roof. There are two storeys and a cellar, and an L-shaped plan, consisting of a four-bay front and a rear wing. In the third bay is a segmental-headed carriage entrance, above it is a name plate, and it is flanked by two-story canted bay windows. In the right bay is a blocked round-headed cellar door, in the left bay is a doorway, and the windows are 16-pane sashes. | II |
| Stable block, The Swan Hotel; 53.82926°N 1.34379°W | — | Late 18th century (probable) | The stable block at the rear of the hotel is in limestone, with a hipped stone slate roof. There are two storeys and an L-shaped plan, consisting of two four-bay ranges at right angles. The west range has four stable doors with windows above. In the south range is a segmental-headed wagon entry, garage doors, other doorways, and in the upper floor are windows. | II |
| Former water mill 53.82988°N 1.34347°W | — | Late 18th century (probable) | The water mill, later altered and used for other purposes, is in magnesian limestone with a tile roof. There are two storeys and a basement, and three bays. In the right gable end is a window with Y-tracery, the other windows have been altered, and doorways have been inserted. | II |
| Becca Hall; 53.84328°N 1.36423°W | | c. 1785 | A country house that was later altered, extended, and used for other purposes. It is in sandstone and has hipped slate roofs. The house consists of a main range of two storeys and five bays with a double-depth plan, flanked by later recessed taller single-bay wings with two storeys and a mezzanine. Above the middle three bays of the main range is a pediment containing an oculus, and at its sides are balustraded parapets. In the centre is a tetrastyle Tuscan porch with an entablature surmounted by a shield, and flanked by canted bay windows. In the upper floor are sash windows, the middle window tripartite. Each wing has a sill band, tripartite windows, and at the top are a moulded cornice, a parapet, and urn finials. | II |
| St Wilfrid's Church and presbytery 53.82316°N 1.34264°W | — | 1793 | The church and presbytery are in magnesian limestone with a slate roof, and form a rectangular range, with the church at the north. The church has a single cell, and the walls contain three round-arched windows with keystones. The presbytery has two storeys and three bays, a central doorway with a fanlight, and altered windows. | II |
| Pikes Head Lodge; 53.83005°N 1.34702°W | | c. 1800 | A former estate lodge, it is in rendered stone, with a moulded cornice, corner chimneys, and a pyramidal slate roof with a ball finial. There are two storeys, with one storey facing the road, and a symmetrical front of three bays. In the centre is a recessed round-headed arch containing the doorway, which has a moulded cornice on consoles, and above it is a family crest with a coronet and a pike's head. This is flanked by casement windows imitating small-pane sash windows. | II |
| Church Terrace; 53.82921°N 1.34327°W | — | Late 18th or early 19th century | A terrace of four cottages in magnesian limestone, Nos. 1 and 3 rendered, with a stone slate roof, and two storeys. Most of the windows are sashes, two doorways have fanlights, and there is a round-headed passage entrance. | II |
| Pump Hill Cottage; 53.83188°N 1.34262°W | | Early 19th century | Two cottages later combined, the building is in magnesian limestone, partly rendered, and has a slate roof with coped gables. There is one storey and attics, and a symmetrical front. At the outer ends are gabled porches, and between are casement windows with hood moulds, and gabled dormers above. | II |
| Milestone, Main Street; 53.83792°N 1.34242°W | | Mid 19th century (probable) | The milestone is on the east side of Main Street, originally the Great North Road. It is in stone with cast iron plates, and has a triangular section and a rounded top. On the top is inscribed "FERRYBRIDGE & BOROUGHBRIDGE ROAD" and "ABERFORD" and on the sides are the distances to Aberford, Wetherby, Ferrybridge, Boroughbridge, and Doncaster. | II |
| Milestone against church garden wall 53.82301°N 1.34332°W | | Mid 19th century (probable) | The milestone is on the east side of Main Street against the garden wall of the church. It is in stone with cast iron plates, and has a triangular section and a rounded top. On the top is inscribed "FERRYBRIDGE & BOROUGHBRIDGE ROAD" and "ABERFORD" and on the sides are the distances to Aberford, Wetherby, Ferrybridge, Boroughbridge, and Doncaster. | II |
| Milestone, York Road; 53.85335°N 1.36906°W | | Mid 19th century (probable) | The milestone is on the north side of York Road (A64 road). It is in stone with cast iron plates, and has a triangular section and a rounded top. On the top is inscribed "TADCASTER AND HALTONDIAL" and "TURNPIKE ROAD", and on the sides are the distances to Leeds and Tadcaster. | II |
| Aberford War Memorial; 53.82234°N 1.34327°W | | 1922 | The war memorial is on the east side of Bunkers Hill. It is in Portland stone, and consists of a cenotaph in the form of a blocked rusticated arch with a fluted impost band and a keystone, above which is a projecting moulded cornice surmounted by a two-stepped pyramidal sarcophagus. This stands on a two-stepped plinth on a concrete base. On the sides are friezes carved with laurel wreaths. In the arch are plaques in Westmorland green slate with inscriptions and the names of those lost in the two World Wars. | II |
