= 1966 Leeds City Council election =

1966 English local government election

The 1966 Leeds municipal elections were held on Thursday 12 May 1966, with one third of the council up for election.

A 2.7% swing towards Labour allowed the party to defend half of their losses of the previous year, and win a majority of the seats up for election, despite still trailing the Conservatives by a significant number in votes. The three Tory gains were in the marginal wards of Beeston, Bramley and Wortley, adding to the gains they were enjoying around the country.

There was a sharp drop in turnout for the election - falling into the twenties for only the second time in post-war history - to 29.6%. Unlike the nadir of 1960 election, where the fall mostly came from the Labour vote, this year's drop chiefly hit Conservative support. None-the-less, the Labour vote received was close to their worst.

The Liberals managed to regain second place in Far Headingley and Wellington, although standing their lowest number of candidates since 1958 and receiving their lowest share since that year. The Communists' received their greatest share on a reduced vote, from their peak in the prior election and the British National Party participated after a five-year absence, fielding a sole candidate in Armley.

== Election result ==
Leeds local election result 1966
Party	Seats	Gains	Losses	Net gain/loss	Seats %	Votes %	Votes	+/−
Labour	16	0	3	-3	57.1	40.7	40,170	+2.9
Conservative	12	3	0	+3	42.8	53.7	52,921	-2.4
Liberal	0	0	0	0	0.0	3.8	3,767	-0.8
Communist	0	0	0	0	0.0	1.6	1,553	+0.1
British National	0	0	0	0	0.0	0.2	195	+0.2

The result had the following consequences for the total number of seats on the council after the elections:

Party	Previous council		New council	
Party	Cllr	Ald	Cllr	Ald
Labour	49	19	46	19
Conservatives	35	9	38	9
Total	84	28	84	28
Total	112		112	
Working majority	14	10	8	10
Working majority	24		18	

== Ward results ==
Allerton
Party	Candidate	Votes	%	±%
Conservative	J. Long	4,388	83.0	+4.2
Labour	J. Marshall	899	17.0	−4.2
Majority		3,489	66.0	+8.4
Turnout		5,287		
Conservative hold		Swing	+4.2	

Armley
Party	Candidate	Votes	%	±%
Labour	S. Lee	1,635	53.3	+0.7
Conservative	K. Beal	1,235	40.3	−7.1
British National	P. Stone	195	6.4	+6.4
Majority		400	13.0	+7.9
Turnout		3,065		
Labour hold		Swing	+3.9	

Beeston
Party	Candidate	Votes	%	±%
Conservative	J. Farrell	2,873	50.8	−7.7
Labour	A. Beevers	2,788	49.2	+9.1
Majority		85	1.5	−16.8
Turnout		5,661		
Conservative gain from Labour		Swing	-8.4	

Blenheim
Party	Candidate	Votes	%	±%
Labour	Ernest Morris	844	60.3	+0.8
Conservative	R. Austwick	555	39.7	−0.8
Majority		289	20.7	+1.6
Turnout		1,399		
Labour hold		Swing	+0.8	

Bramley
Party	Candidate	Votes	%	±%
Conservative	D. Armitage	2,523	52.7	−3.7
Labour	M. Chadwick	2,264	47.3	+3.7
Majority		259	5.4	−7.4
Turnout		4,787		
Conservative gain from Labour		Swing	-3.7	

Burmantofts
Party	Candidate	Votes	%	±%
Labour	F. Watson	1,413	57.2	+1.1
Conservative	J. White	1,058	42.8	−1.1
Majority		355	14.4	+2.2
Turnout		2,471		
Labour hold		Swing	+1.1	

City
Party	Candidate	Votes	%	±%
Labour	Jim Marshall	696	65.4	+3.8
Conservative	M. Baker	368	34.6	−3.8
Majority		328	30.8	+7.6
Turnout		1,064		
Labour hold		Swing	+3.8	

Cross Gates
Party	Candidate	Votes	%	±%
Labour	L. Jackson	1,847	49.1	−8.7
Conservative	R. Vaughan	1,693	45.0	+9.3
Communist	F. Sidebottom	224	6.0	−0.6
Majority		154	4.1	−17.9
Turnout		3,764		
Labour hold		Swing	-9.0	

East Hunslet
Party	Candidate	Votes	%	±%
Labour	E. Haughton	1,070	64.0	+0.9
Conservative	P. Wooler	601	36.0	−0.9
Majority		469	28.0	+1.8
Turnout		1,671		
Labour hold		Swing	+0.9	

Far Headingley
Party	Candidate	Votes	%	±%
Conservative	G. Somers	4,630	65.0	−2.2
Liberal	J. Harris	1,485	20.8	+6.8
Labour	N. Jenner	1,012	14.2	−4.6
Majority		3,145	44.1	−4.3
Turnout		7,127		
Conservative hold		Swing	-4.5	

Halton
Party	Candidate	Votes	%	±%
Conservative	J. Brooksbank	3,978	77.4	−1.0
Labour	D. Hamilton	1,161	22.6	+1.0
Majority		2,817	54.8	−1.9
Turnout		5,139		
Conservative hold		Swing	-1.0	

Harehills
Party	Candidate	Votes	%	±%
Conservative	J. Astle	2,380	60.9	+2.0
Labour	H. Howlett	1,525	39.1	+3.6
Majority		855	21.9	−1.5
Turnout		3,905		
Conservative hold		Swing	-0.8	

Holbeck
Party	Candidate	Votes	%	±%
Labour	W. Smith	1,326	61.8	+6.8
Conservative	M. Waddington	759	35.4	−2.8
Communist	J. McCarthy	59	2.8	−4.0
Majority		567	26.4	+9.6
Turnout		2,144		
Labour hold		Swing	+4.8	

Hunslet Carr
Party	Candidate	Votes	%	±%
Labour	Harry Booth	1,427	67.0	+9.1
Conservative	H. Lister	630	29.6	−8.1
Communist	E. Burwin	73	3.4	−1.0
Majority		797	37.4	+17.1
Turnout		2,130		
Labour hold		Swing	+8.6	

Hyde Park
Party	Candidate	Votes	%	±%
Conservative	Kenneth Davison	2,030	57.8	+1.9
Labour	M. Lawrence	1,342	38.2	+12.1
Communist	S. Walker	143	4.1	+1.5
Majority		688	19.6	−10.2
Turnout		3,515		
Conservative hold		Swing	-5.1	

Kirkstall
Party	Candidate	Votes	%	±%
Labour	D. Matthews	2,864	54.4	+8.2
Conservative	H. Newton	2,251	42.8	−7.6
Communist	B. Huffingley	148	2.8	−0.6
Majority		613	11.6	7.4
Turnout		5,263		
Labour hold		Swing	+7.9	

Meanwood
Party	Candidate	Votes	%	±%
Conservative	Alan Pedley	2,596	66.7	−0.9
Labour	J. McPheat	824	21.2	−0.8
Liberal	Evelyn Mary Briggs	470	12.1	+1.6
Majority		1,772	45.6	−0.1
Turnout		3,890		
Conservative hold		Swing	-0.0	

Middleton
Party	Candidate	Votes	%	±%
Labour	J. Taylor	1,872	79.1	+4.4
Conservative	R. Heslet	389	16.4	−3.0
Communist	E. Moore	106	4.5	−1.4
Majority		1,483	62.7	+7.4
Turnout		2,367		
Labour hold		Swing	+3.7	

Moortown
Party	Candidate	Votes	%	±%
Conservative	S. Bolton	4,540	75.6	+4.4
Labour	D. Chadwick	1,082	18.0	−1.1
Communist	P. Boyes	384	6.4	+3.9
Majority		3,458	57.6	+5.5
Turnout		6,006		
Conservative hold		Swing	+2.7	

Osmondthorpe
Party	Candidate	Votes	%	±%
Labour	Douglas Gabb	1,234	67.6	+2.3
Conservative	E. Lewis	592	32.4	−2.3
Majority		642	35.2	+4.7
Turnout		1,826		
Labour hold		Swing	+2.3	

Potternewton
Party	Candidate	Votes	%	±%
Conservative	D. Bradley	1,676	59.8	+3.6
Labour	Joyce Gould	819	29.2	−2.2
Liberal	Sydney Herbert Bexan	259	9.2	−1.3
Communist	R. Rawson	49	1.7	−0.1
Majority		857	30.6	+5.8
Turnout		2,803		
Conservative hold		Swing	+2.9	

Richmond Hill
Party	Candidate	Votes	%	±%
Labour	M. Rooney	1,547	71.2	+1.7
Conservative	E. Dean	446	20.5	−4.1
Communist	T. Johnson	179	8.2	+2.5
Majority		1,101	50.7	+5.8
Turnout		2,172		
Labour hold		Swing	+2.9	

Roundhay
Party	Candidate	Votes	%	±%
Conservative	D. Wolstenholme	3,793	78.5	+1.1
Labour	D. Thomas	1,037	21.5	−1.1
Majority		2,756	57.1	+2.3
Turnout		4,830		
Conservative hold		Swing	+1.1	

Stanningley
Party	Candidate	Votes	%	±%
Labour	Kevin Gould	1,979	45.2	+7.8
Conservative	A. Redmond	1,739	39.8	−5.4
Liberal	F. Robertson	656	15.0	−2.4
Majority		240	5.5	−2.2
Turnout		4,374		
Labour hold		Swing	+6.6	

Wellington
Party	Candidate	Votes	%	±%
Labour	A. Donohoe	950	62.8	+4.4
Liberal	G. Hoyland	237	15.7	−0.3
Conservative	D. Tiffany	235	15.5	−5.3
Communist	M. Rogers	91	6.0	+1.2
Majority		713	47.1	+9.6
Turnout		1,513		
Labour hold		Swing	+2.3	

Westfield
Party	Candidate	Votes	%	±%
Labour	J. Bell	1,031	51.3	+7.9
Conservative	A. Sexton	978	48.7	−7.9
Majority		53	2.6	−10.6
Turnout		2,009		
Labour hold		Swing	+7.9	

Woodhouse
Party	Candidate	Votes	%	±%
Labour	R. Ellis	1,507	48.7	+3.8
Conservative	D. Crawford	1,493	48.2	−3.5
Communist	A. Dale	97	3.1	−0.3
Majority		14	0.5	−6.3
Turnout		3,097		
Labour hold		Swing	+3.6	

Wortley
Party	Candidate	Votes	%	±%
Conservative	F. Stubley	2,492	46.8	−4.6
Labour	J. Moynihan	2,175	40.8	+2.3
Liberal	Walter Holdsworth	660	12.4	+2.3
Majority		317	6.0	−6.8
Turnout		5,327		
Conservative gain from Labour		Swing	-3.4	
