= 1959 Leeds City Council election =

English local election

The 1959 Leeds municipal elections were held on Thursday 7 May 1959, with one third of the seats and extra vacancies in East Hunslet and Stanningley up for election.

Mirroring their national recovery, the Conservatives achieved a 3% swing to win the popular vote and make the only gain of the night in the marginal Wortley. The Liberals fielded their greatest number of candidates since 1951, and as such received their highest vote since then. Turnout fell by just under a percentage point from the year before to 36.3%.

== Election result ==
Leeds local election result 1959
Party	Seats	Gains	Losses	Net gain/loss	Seats %	Votes %	Votes	+/−
Labour	19	0	1	-1	63.3	46.5	59,182	-3.3
Conservative	11	1	0	+1	36.7	49.0	62,414	+2.9
Liberal	0	0	0	0	0.0	4.0	5,046	+0.3
Communist	0	0	0	0	0.0	0.5	630	+0.1

The result had the following consequences for the total number of seats on the council after the elections:

Party	Previous council		New council	
Party	Cllr	Ald	Cllr	Ald
Labour	55	18	54	18
Conservatives	29	10	30	10
Total	84	28	84	28
Total	112		112	
Working majority	26	8	24	8
Working majority	34		32	

== Ward results ==
Allerton
Party	Candidate	Votes	%	±%
Conservative	M. Mustill	4,704	87.4	+1.4
Labour	A. Baum	681	12.6	−1.4
Majority		4,023	74.8	+2.8
Turnout		5,385		
Conservative hold		Swing	+1.4	

Armley
Party	Candidate	Votes	%	±%
Labour	J. Bissell	2,341	57.1	−1.3
Conservative	J. Ashworth	1,756	42.9	+1.3
Majority		585	14.2	−2.6
Turnout		4,097		
Labour hold		Swing	-1.3	

Beeston
Party	Candidate	Votes	%	±%
Conservative	P. Woodward	3,555	46.6	+3.8
Labour	N. Billington	3,250	42.6	+1.0
Liberal	H. Passmore	820	10.8	−4.8
Majority		305	4.0	+2.8
Turnout		7,625		
Conservative hold		Swing	+1.4	

Blenheim
Party	Candidate	Votes	%	±%
Labour	W. Merritt	1,861	63.4	−5.7
Conservative	J. Butterfield	1,076	36.6	+5.7
Majority		785	26.7	−11.4
Turnout		2,937		
Labour hold		Swing	-5.7	

Bramley
Party	Candidate	Votes	%	±%
Labour	W. Lord	2,723	50.3	−0.1
Conservative	C. Dean	2,214	40.9	+6.3
Liberal	George Petch	474	8.8	−6.2
Majority		509	9.4	−6.4
Turnout		5,411		
Labour hold		Swing	-3.2	

Burmantofts
Party	Candidate	Votes	%	±%
Labour	G. Murray	2,058	68.3	−3.9
Conservative	H. Robinson	956	31.7	+3.9
Majority		1,102	36.6	−7.8
Turnout		3,014		
Labour hold		Swing	-3.9	

City
Party	Candidate	Votes	%	±%
Labour	Bernard Atha	1,373	64.6	−2.7
Conservative	B. Emmett	751	35.4	+2.7
Majority		622	29.3	−5.4
Turnout		2,124		
Labour hold		Swing	-2.7	

Cross Gates
Party	Candidate	Votes	%	±%
Labour	A. Harrison	3,273	63.6	−5.2
Conservative	F. Hodges	1,874	36.4	+5.2
Majority		1,399	27.2	−10.4
Turnout		5,147		
Labour hold		Swing	-5.2	

East Hunslet
Party	Candidate	Votes	%	±%
Labour	E. Kavanagh	2,349	74.5	−2.2
Labour	E. Haughton	2,149		
Conservative	D. Mowbray	802	25.5	+2.2
Majority		1,347	49.1	−4.5
Turnout		3,151		
Labour hold		Swing		
Labour hold		Swing	-2.2	

Far Headingley
Party	Candidate	Votes	%	±%
Conservative	G. Dovenor	4,351	65.1	−12.9
Labour	J. Stephenson	1,212	18.1	−3.9
Liberal	John Humphrey Morrish	1,122	16.8	+16.8
Majority		3,139	47.0	−9.0
Turnout		6,685		
Conservative hold		Swing	-4.5	

Halton
Party	Candidate	Votes	%	±%
Conservative	J. Dougray	4,349	75.8	+0.5
Labour	J. Taylor	1,391	24.2	−0.5
Majority		2,958	51.5	+1.0
Turnout		5,740		
Conservative hold		Swing	+0.5	

Harehills
Party	Candidate	Votes	%	±%
Conservative	Patrick Crotty	3,177	55.6	+2.1
Labour	J. Klineberg	2,532	44.4	−2.1
Majority		645	11.3	+4.2
Turnout		5,709		
Conservative hold		Swing	+2.1	

Holbeck
Party	Candidate	Votes	%	±%
Labour	G. Bray	2,148	59.0	−3.3
Conservative	B. Morland	882	24.2	+7.2
Liberal	H. Fearnley	608	16.7	−3.8
Majority		1,266	34.8	−7.1
Turnout		3,638		
Labour hold		Swing	-5.2	

Hunslet Carr
Party	Candidate	Votes	%	±%
Labour	W. Parker	2,442	69.1	−6.4
Conservative	A. Roberts	700	19.8	+8.8
Liberal	J.T. Hill	392	11.1	+1.6
Majority		1,742	49.3	−15.2
Turnout		3,534		
Labour hold		Swing	-7.6	

Hyde Park
Party	Candidate	Votes	%	±%
Conservative	H. Walmsley	2,713	63.9	+6.0
Labour	W. Fanning	1,532	36.1	−6.0
Majority		1,181	27.8	+11.9
Turnout		4,245		
Conservative hold		Swing	+6.0	

Kirkstall
Party	Candidate	Votes	%	±%
Labour	D. Matthews	3,053	58.2	−0.8
Conservative	S. Codd	2,195	41.8	+0.8
Majority		858	16.3	−1.6
Turnout		5,248		
Labour hold		Swing	-0.8	

Meanwood
Party	Candidate	Votes	%	±%
Conservative	T. Kirkby	3,696	73.3	+0.7
Labour	E. Webber	1,347	26.7	−0.7
Majority		2,349	46.6	+1.4
Turnout		5,043		
Conservative hold		Swing	+0.7	

Middleton
Party	Candidate	Votes	%	±%
Labour	S. Binns	2,694	76.8	+3.7
Conservative	A. Hartley	491	14.0	+3.8
Liberal	Walter Holdsworth	219	6.2	−6.5
Communist	E. Moore	105	3.0	−1.1
Majority		2,203	62.8	+2.5
Turnout		3,509		
Labour hold		Swing	-0.0	

Moortown
Party	Candidate	Votes	%	±%
Conservative	L. Henson	4,606	76.8	+0.0
Labour	L. Steele	1,388	23.2	−0.0
Majority		3,218	53.7	+0.0
Turnout		5,994		
Conservative hold		Swing	+0.0	

Osmondthorpe
Party	Candidate	Votes	%	±%
Labour	L. Walsh	3,162	74.3	−2.7
Conservative	F. Barry	1,094	25.7	+2.7
Majority		2,068	48.6	−5.3
Turnout		4,256		
Labour hold		Swing	-2.7	

Potternewton
Party	Candidate	Votes	%	±%
Conservative	L. Lyons	2,266	65.8	+4.0
Labour	V. Zermansky	1,021	29.7	−8.5
Communist	H. Fawcett	156	4.5	+4.5
Majority		1,245	36.2	+12.6
Turnout		3,443		
Conservative hold		Swing	+6.2	

Richmond Hill
Party	Candidate	Votes	%	±%
Labour	W. Cain	1,496	76.1	−3.9
Conservative	H. Flockton	469	23.9	+3.9
Majority		1,027	52.3	−7.7
Turnout		1,965		
Labour hold		Swing	-3.9	

Roundhay
Party	Candidate	Votes	%	±%
Conservative	H. Jowitt	4,142	70.3	+2.8
Labour	E. Colley	1,747	29.7	−2.8
Majority		2,395	40.7	+5.6
Turnout		5,889		
Conservative hold		Swing	+2.8	

Stanningley
Party	Candidate	Votes	%	±%
Labour	Jim Marshall	2,441	45.9	−6.0
Labour	E. Coward	2,436		
Conservative	A. Vickers	1,890	35.5	+7.9
Conservative	D. Vickers	1,658		
Liberal	J. Grimshaw	991	18.6	−1.9
Liberal	Julius Blum	617		
Majority		551	10.4	−13.9
Turnout		5,322		
Labour hold		Swing		
Labour hold		Swing	-6.9	

Wellington
Party	Candidate	Votes	%	±%
Labour	J. Underwood	2,129	74.0	−5.2
Conservative	B. Pearce	548	19.1	+4.6
Communist	G. Hodgson	199	6.9	+0.6
Majority		1,581	55.0	−9.8
Turnout		2,876		
Labour hold		Swing	-4.9	

Westfield
Party	Candidate	Votes	%	±%
Labour	Stan Cohen	2,141	51.8	−0.3
Conservative	May Sexton	1,992	48.2	+0.3
Majority		149	3.6	−0.6
Turnout		4,133		
Labour hold		Swing	-0.3	

Woodhouse
Party	Candidate	Votes	%	±%
Labour	H. Bretherick	2,153	47.9	−12.0
Conservative	A. Chadwick	1,755	39.0	−1.1
Liberal	Wilfred Ernest Hopper	420	9.3	+9.3
Communist	D. Banks	170	3.8	+3.8
Majority		398	8.8	−11.0
Turnout		4,498		
Labour hold		Swing	-5.4	

Wortley
Party	Candidate	Votes	%	±%
Conservative	F. Stubley	3,410	51.2	+1.8
Labour	W. Smart	3,244	48.8	−1.8
Majority		166	2.5	+1.3
Turnout		6,654		
Conservative gain from Labour		Swing	+1.8	
