= 1957 Leeds City Council election =

English local election

The 1957 Leeds municipal elections were held 9 May 1957, with one third of the council up for election, alongside extra vacancies in the City, Halton and Woodhouse wards.

Much like the national picture, with Labour winning record representation on borough councils, Labour outstripped their prior efforts, defending all of their 1954 gains as well as gaining in Beeston and Harehills – two wards they failed to win in their peak of 1952, despite accruing only a modest swing of 1.2% swing (although they had come within a vote to taking the former the previous year). Unlike 1952 or the year before, Labour failed to gain Wortley this time, as the Liberal damage to the Conservative vote was unwound. The two gains increased Labour's majority to 28, mirroring the Conservatives' after their triumphant 1951 election. Turnout rose to 36.2% following last year's plummet to the low thirties.

== Election result ==
Leeds local election result 1957
Party	Seats	Gains	Losses	Net gain/loss	Seats %	Votes %	Votes	+/−
Labour	21	2	0	+2	67.7	50.2	64,454	+2.0
Conservative	10	0	2	-2	32.2	46.4	59,508	-1.0
Liberal	0	0	0	0	0.0	3.1	4,019	-0.6
Communist	0	0	0	0	0.0	0.3	374	-0.3

The result had the following consequences for the total number of seats on the council after the elections:

Party	Previous council		New council	
Party	Cllr	Ald	Cllr	Ald
Labour	51	17	53	17
Conservatives	33	11	31	11
Total	84	28	84	28
Total	112		112	
Working majority	18	6	22	6
Working majority	24		28	

== Ward results ==
Allerton
Party	Candidate	Votes	%	±%
Conservative	B. Lyons	5,091	86.6	+0.8
Labour	J. Klineberg	787	13.4	−0.8
Majority		4,304	73.2	+1.6
Turnout		5,878		
Conservative hold		Swing	+0.8	

Armley
Party	Candidate	Votes	%	±%
Labour	S. Lee	2,621	56.7	+0.9
Conservative	J. Broomfield	2,002	43.3	−0.9
Majority		619	13.4	+1.8
Turnout		4,623		
Labour hold		Swing	+0.9	

Beeston
Party	Candidate	Votes	%	±%
Labour	A. Tallant	3,688	47.2	−2.8
Conservative	J. Farrell	3,363	43.0	−7.0
Liberal	H. Passmore	764	9.8	+9.8
Majority		325	4.2	+4.2
Turnout		7,815		
Labour gain from Conservative		Swing	+2.1	

Blenheim
Party	Candidate	Votes	%	±%
Labour	L. Lake	2,268	67.6	+7.2
Conservative	W. McClellan	1,085	32.4	−7.2
Majority		1,183	35.3	+14.4
Turnout		3,353		
Labour hold		Swing	+7.2	

Bramley
Party	Candidate	Votes	%	±%
Labour	G. Rhodes	3,285	54.4	+5.9
Conservative	B. Pearce	1,938	32.1	−4.1
Liberal	J. Walker	811	13.4	−1.8
Majority		1,347	22.3	+10.0
Turnout		6,034		
Labour hold		Swing	+5.0	

Burmantofts
Party	Candidate	Votes	%	±%
Labour	F. Watson	2,414	70.7	+4.4
Conservative	S. Hick	1,002	29.3	−4.4
Majority		1,412	41.3	+8.7
Turnout		3,416		
Labour hold		Swing	+4.4	

City
Party	Candidate	Votes	%	±%
Labour	W. Stoner	1,846	64.9	+0.3
Labour	Bernard Atha	1,745		
Conservative	J. Butterfield	999	35.1	−0.3
Conservative	K. Wigin	992		
Majority		746	29.8	+0.6
Turnout		2,845		
Labour hold		Swing		
Labour hold		Swing	+0.3	

Cross Gates
Party	Candidate	Votes	%	±%
Labour	L. Jackson	3,188	61.9	−1.4
Conservative	H. Williams	1,964	38.1	+1.4
Majority		1,224	23.8	−2.8
Turnout		5,152		
Labour hold		Swing	-1.4	

East Hunslet
Party	Candidate	Votes	%	±%
Labour	F. Naylor	2,498	75.3	+1.8
Conservative	B. Watson	820	24.7	−1.8
Majority		1,678	50.6	+3.5
Turnout		3,318		
Labour hold		Swing	+1.8	

Far Headingley
Party	Candidate	Votes	%	±%
Conservative	S. Rostron	4,145	74.8	−4.5
Labour	G. Brogden	1,399	25.2	+4.5
Majority		2,746	49.5	−9.0
Turnout		5,544		
Conservative hold		Swing	-4.5	

Halton
Party	Candidate	Votes	%	±%
Conservative	J. Brooksbank	3,958	77.2	+0.5
Conservative	J. Dougray	3,768		
Labour	J. Marshall	1,172	22.8	−0.5
Labour	A. Grange	1,135		
Majority		2,596	54.3	+1.0
Turnout		5,130		
Conservative hold		Swing		
Conservative hold		Swing	+0.5	

Harehills
Party	Candidate	Votes	%	±%
Labour	R. Sedler	2,825	50.5	+2.9
Conservative	N. Kay	2,770	49.5	−2.9
Majority		55	1.0	−3.9
Turnout		5,595		
Labour gain from Conservative		Swing	+2.9	

Holbeck
Party	Candidate	Votes	%	±%
Labour	T. Smith	2,344	61.0	+0.0
Conservative	K. Orton	835	21.7	+0.6
Liberal	John Brian Meeks	661	17.2	−0.5
Majority		1,509	39.3	−0.6
Turnout		3,840		
Labour hold		Swing	-0.3	

Hunslet Carr
Party	Candidate	Votes	%	±%
Labour	Harry Booth	2,708	80.4	−11.7
Conservative	J. Judge	544	16.2	+16.2
Communist	E. Moore	116	3.4	−4.5
Majority		2,164	64.3	−19.8
Turnout		3,368		
Labour hold		Swing	-13.9	

Hyde Park
Party	Candidate	Votes	%	±%
Conservative	Kenneth Davison	2,828	60.3	−7.9
Labour	E. Coward	1,865	39.7	+7.9
Majority		963	20.5	−15.7
Turnout		4,693		
Conservative hold		Swing	-7.9	

Kirkstall
Party	Candidate	Votes	%	±%
Labour	A. Happold	3,171	60.9	−0.1
Conservative	E. Lodge	2,032	39.1	+0.1
Majority		1,139	21.9	−0.2
Turnout		5,203		
Labour hold		Swing	-0.1	

Meanwood
Party	Candidate	Votes	%	±%
Conservative	Alan Pedley	3,654	73.9	−1.8
Labour	F. Woolhouse	1,291	26.1	+1.8
Majority		2,363	47.8	−3.5
Turnout		4,945		
Conservative hold		Swing	-1.8	

Middleton
Party	Candidate	Votes	%	±%
Labour	Arthur Brown	2,429	83.2	−2.2
Conservative	F. Stubley	491	16.8	+2.2
Majority		1,938	66.4	−4.4
Turnout		2,920		
Labour hold		Swing	-2.2	

Moortown
Party	Candidate	Votes	%	±%
Conservative	S. Bolton	4,306	74.2	−3.4
Labour	L. Steele	1,496	25.8	+3.4
Majority		2,810	48.4	−6.9
Turnout		5,802		
Conservative hold		Swing	-3.4	

Osmondthorpe
Party	Candidate	Votes	%	±%
Labour	Douglas Gabb	2,710	77.1	+1.8
Conservative	L. Ideson	807	22.9	−1.8
Majority		1,903	54.1	+3.5
Turnout		3,517		
Labour hold		Swing	+1.8	

Potternewton
Party	Candidate	Votes	%	±%
Conservative	D. Bradley	2,044	60.4	−0.5
Labour	V. Zermansky	1,341	39.6	+5.6
Majority		703	20.8	−6.1
Turnout		3,385		
Conservative hold		Swing	-3.0	

Richmond Hill
Party	Candidate	Votes	%	±%
Labour	M. Rooney	1,825	77.0	+0.3
Conservative	J. Ashworth	544	23.0	−0.3
Majority		1,281	54.1	+0.6
Turnout		2,369		
Labour hold		Swing	+0.3	

Roundhay
Party	Candidate	Votes	%	±%
Conservative	G. Monkman	3,927	67.8	−3.0
Labour	D. Yelland	1,867	32.2	+3.0
Majority		2,060	35.6	−5.9
Turnout		5,794		
Conservative hold		Swing	-3.0	

Stanningley
Party	Candidate	Votes	%	±%
Labour	W. Spence	2,646	50.3	+0.9
Conservative	A. Vickers	1,644	31.2	+0.5
Liberal	J. Grimshaw	972	18.5	−1.4
Majority		1,002	19.0	+0.3
Turnout		5,262		
Labour hold		Swing	+0.2	

Wellington
Party	Candidate	Votes	%	±%
Labour	Aimee Tong	2,413	90.3	+13.6
Communist	G. Hodgson	258	9.7	+4.8
Majority		2,155	80.7	+22.4
Turnout		2,671		
Labour hold		Swing	+4.4	

Westfield
Party	Candidate	Votes	%	±%
Labour	H. Wiseman	2,639	56.0	+2.4
Conservative	M. Sexton	1,735	36.8	+0.0
Liberal	George Petch	337	7.2	−2.4
Majority		904	19.2	+2.5
Turnout		4,711		
Labour hold		Swing	+1.2	

Woodhouse
Party	Candidate	Votes	%	±%
Labour	R. Ellis	2,754	60.3	+10.7
Labour	P. Taylor	2,583		
Conservative	A. Chadwick	1,813	39.7	−5.4
Conservative	L. Francis	1,787		
Majority		941	20.6	+16.1
Turnout		4,567		
Labour hold		Swing		
Labour hold		Swing	+8.0	

Wortley
Party	Candidate	Votes	%	±%
Conservative	Bertrand Mather	3,167	47.9	+4.7
Labour	E. Morris	2,964	44.9	+1.1
Liberal	Walter Holdsworth	474	7.2	−5.8
Majority		203	3.1	+2.5
Turnout		6,605		
Conservative hold		Swing	+1.8	
