= 1960 Leeds City Council election =

English local election

The 1960 Leeds municipal elections were held on 12 May 1960, with one third of the council set to be re-elected.

A large swing of 5.5% to the Conservatives allowed them their first election victory since 1951 - having won the most votes in several elections since then, but never amounting to a majority of seats. The Conservatives made their six gains from Labour in the wards of Beeston, Bramley, Harehills, Stanningley, Westfield, Woodhouse and Wortley, halving Labour's majority of councillors from 24 to 12.

Elsewhere, the Liberals managed a post-war first of beating Labour to second place in Allerton and Far Headingley, and the first Independent candidate standing since the war, Dennis Peddar, made negligible impact in Westfield. Turnout fell sharply for this election - by nearly a quarter from the previous year - to a new low of 27.5%.

== Election result ==
Leeds local election result 1960
Party	Seats	Gains	Losses	Net gain/loss	Seats %	Votes %	Votes	+/−
Conservative	15	6	0	+6	53.6	54.3	52,399	+5.3
Labour	13	0	6	-6	46.4	41.0	39,553	-5.5
Liberal	0	0	0	0	0.0	4.2	4,029	+0.2
Communist	0	0	0	0	0.0	0.5	500	0.0
Independent	0	0	0	0	0.0	0.1	73	+0.1

The result had the following consequences for the total number of seats on the council after the elections:

Party	Previous council		New council	
Party	Cllr	Ald	Cllr	Ald
Labour	54	18	48	18
Conservatives	30	10	36	10
Total	84	28	84	28
Total	112		112	
Working majority	24	8	12	8
Working majority	32		20	

== Ward results ==
Allerton
Party	Candidate	Votes	%	±%
Conservative	B. Lyons	3,514	76.8	−10.6
Liberal	Julius Blum	674	14.7	+14.7
Labour	A. Baum	388	8.5	−4.2
Majority		2,840	62.1	−12.6
Turnout		4,576		
Conservative hold		Swing	-12.6	

Armley
Party	Candidate	Votes	%	±%
Labour	S. Lee	1,582	52.7	−4.5
Conservative	R. Beal	1,421	47.3	+4.5
Majority		161	5.4	−8.9
Turnout		3,003		
Labour hold		Swing	-4.5	

Beeston
Party	Candidate	Votes	%	±%
Conservative	J. Farrell	3,004	50.0	+3.4
Labour	A. Tallant	2,573	42.8	+0.2
Liberal	H. Linley	433	7.2	−3.5
Majority		431	7.2	+3.2
Turnout		6,010		
Conservative gain from Labour		Swing	+1.6	

Blenheim
Party	Candidate	Votes	%	±%
Labour	B. Sedgley	1,736	65.2	+1.9
Conservative	J. Butterfield	926	34.8	−1.9
Majority		810	30.4	+3.7
Turnout		2,662		
Labour hold		Swing	+1.9	

Bramley
Party	Candidate	Votes	%	±%
Conservative	C. Dean	2,279	49.5	+8.6
Labour	H. Battersby	1,879	40.8	−9.5
Liberal	Walter Holdsworth	446	9.7	+0.9
Majority		400	8.7	−0.7
Turnout		4,604		
Conservative gain from Labour		Swing	+9.0	

Burmantofts
Party	Candidate	Votes	%	±%
Labour	F. Watson	1,384	64.1	−4.2
Conservative	D. Mowbray	776	35.9	+4.2
Majority		608	28.2	−8.6
Turnout		2,160		
Labour hold		Swing	-4.2	

City
Party	Candidate	Votes	%	±%
Labour	W. Stoner	901	57.3	−7.4
Conservative	B. Emmett	672	42.7	+7.4
Majority		229	14.6	−14.7
Turnout		1,573		
Labour hold		Swing	-7.4	

Cross Gates
Party	Candidate	Votes	%	±%
Labour	L. Jackson	2,121	55.5	−8.1
Conservative	G. Lockwood	1,700	44.5	+8.1
Majority		421	11.0	−16.2
Turnout		3,821		
Labour hold		Swing	-8.1	

East Hunslet
Party	Candidate	Votes	%	±%
Labour	E. Houghton	1,313	65.3	−9.3
Conservative	M. Green	699	34.7	+9.3
Majority		614	30.5	−18.6
Turnout		2,012		
Labour hold		Swing	-9.3	

Far Headingley
Party	Candidate	Votes	%	±%
Conservative	S. Rostron	3,374	62.6	−2.5
Liberal	John Humphrey Morrish	1,098	20.4	+3.6
Labour	H. Swain	917	17.0	−1.1
Majority		2,276	42.2	−4.8
Turnout		5,389		
Conservative hold		Swing	-3.0	

Halton
Party	Candidate	Votes	%	±%
Conservative	J. Brooksbank	3,752	80.7	+4.9
Labour	L. Wray	897	19.3	−4.9
Majority		2,855	61.4	+9.9
Turnout		4,649		
Conservative hold		Swing	+4.9	

Harehills
Party	Candidate	Votes	%	±%
Conservative	J. Astle	2,734	63.5	+7.9
Labour	W. Todd	1,569	36.5	−7.9
Majority		1,165	27.1	+15.8
Turnout		4,303		
Conservative gain from Labour		Swing	+7.9	

Holbeck
Party	Candidate	Votes	%	±%
Labour	T. Smith	1,342	64.1	+5.0
Conservative	B. Morland	752	35.9	+11.7
Majority		590	28.2	−6.6
Turnout		2,094		
Labour hold		Swing	-3.3	

Hunslet Carr
Party	Candidate	Votes	%	±%
Labour	Harry Booth	1,550	68.8	−0.3
Conservative	A. Roberts	704	31.2	+11.4
Majority		846	37.5	−11.8
Turnout		2,254		
Labour hold		Swing	-5.8	

Hyde Park
Party	Candidate	Votes	%	±%
Conservative	Kenneth Davison	2,095	70.6	+6.7
Labour	L. Steele	874	29.4	−6.7
Majority		1,221	41.1	+13.3
Turnout		2,969		
Conservative hold		Swing	+6.7	

Kirkstall
Party	Candidate	Votes	%	±%
Labour	A. Happold	2,251	51.8	−6.3
Conservative	S. Codd	2,092	48.2	+6.3
Majority		159	3.7	−12.6
Turnout		4,343		
Labour hold		Swing	-6.3	

Meanwood
Party	Candidate	Votes	%	±%
Conservative	Alan Pedley	2,989	77.9	+4.7
Labour	A. Kirk	846	22.1	−4.7
Majority		2,143	55.9	+9.3
Turnout		3,835		
Conservative hold		Swing	+4.7	

Middleton
Party	Candidate	Votes	%	±%
Labour	Arthur Brown	1,405	72.1	−4.7
Conservative	H. Alexander	427	21.9	+7.9
Communist	R. Wilkinson	118	6.1	+3.1
Majority		978	50.2	−12.6
Turnout		1,950		
Labour hold		Swing	-6.3	

Moortown
Party	Candidate	Votes	%	±%
Conservative	S. Bolton	3,714	80.9	+4.0
Labour	D. Thomas	879	19.1	−4.0
Majority		2,835	61.7	+8.0
Turnout		4,593		
Conservative hold		Swing	+4.0	

Osmondthorpe
Party	Candidate	Votes	%	±%
Labour	Douglas Gabb	1,774	71.2	−3.1
Conservative	A. Lunn	719	28.8	+3.1
Majority		1,055	42.3	−6.3
Turnout		2,493		
Labour hold		Swing	-3.1	

Potternewton
Party	Candidate	Votes	%	±%
Conservative	D. Bradley	1,691	70.1	+4.3
Labour	Kevin Gould	602	25.0	−4.7
Communist	H. Fawcett	118	4.9	+0.4
Majority		1,089	45.2	+9.0
Turnout		2,411		
Conservative hold		Swing	+4.5	

Richmond Hill
Party	Candidate	Votes	%	±%
Labour	M. Rooney	1,093	74.2	−2.0
Conservative	H. Flockton	381	25.8	+2.0
Majority		712	48.3	−4.0
Turnout		1,474		
Labour hold		Swing	-2.0	

Roundhay
Party	Candidate	Votes	%	±%
Conservative	G. Monkman	3,362	79.1	+8.8
Labour	D. Yelland	888	20.9	−8.8
Majority		2,474	58.2	+17.5
Turnout		4,250		
Conservative hold		Swing	+8.8	

Stanningley
Party	Candidate	Votes	%	±%
Conservative	A. Vickers	1,749	42.6	+7.1
Labour	E. Coward	1,621	39.5	−6.4
Liberal	J. Grimshaw	734	17.9	−0.7
Majority		128	3.1	−7.3
Turnout		4,104		
Conservative gain from Labour		Swing	+6.7	

Wellington
Party	Candidate	Votes	%	±%
Labour	Aimee Tong	1,862	72.4	−1.7
Conservative	B. Pearce	542	21.1	+2.0
Communist	G. Hodgson	169	6.6	−0.4
Majority		1,320	51.3	−3.7
Turnout		2,573		
Labour hold		Swing	-1.8	

Westfield
Party	Candidate	Votes	%	±%
Conservative	May Sexton	1,576	44.1	−4.1
Labour	H. Wiseman	1,397	39.1	−12.7
Liberal	E. Vasey	530	14.8	+14.8
Independent	Dennis Pedder	73	2.0	+2.0
Majority		179	5.0	+1.4
Turnout		3,576		
Conservative gain from Labour		Swing	+4.3	

Woodhouse
Party	Candidate	Votes	%	±%
Conservative	A. Chadwick	1,686	48.6	+9.6
Labour	R. Ellis	1,572	45.3	−2.5
Liberal	A. Oliver	114	3.3	−6.0
Communist	E. Meth	95	2.7	−1.0
Majority		114	3.3	−5.5
Turnout		3,467		
Conservative gain from Labour		Swing	+6.0	

Wortley
Party	Candidate	Votes	%	±%
Conservative	Bertrand Mather	3,069	56.8	+5.5
Labour	J. Stephenson	2,337	43.2	−5.5
Majority		732	13.5	+11.0
Turnout		5,406		
Conservative hold		Swing	+5.5	
