= 1956 Leeds City Council election =

1956 English local government election

The 1956 municipal elections for Leeds were held on Thursday 10 May 1956, with one third of the council and an extra vacancy in Hyde Park to be elected.

A 3% swing to Labour seen them once again on top in votes, although things may have been closer had the Conservatives stood candidates in Hunslet Carr and Wellington. With the swing, Labour managed to hold on to all of their 1953 gains; most fairly comfortably. The notable exceptions were in Woodhouse, one of the few wards to record a swing to the Conservatives - of 4.6% no less - reducing Labour's majority to 169 votes. The other being Wortley, where the Liberal intervention there hit the Conservatives twice as hard as Labour, helping them to retain their seat by 31 votes. The closest run result, in actuality, was found in Beeston - with Labour just one vote away from a gain there. As such the night ended without a gain, leaving the dramatic drop in turnout - from what was already one of the worst recorded since the war - by a fifth to an all-time low of 31.4% the main story.

== Election result ==
Leeds local election result 1956
| Party | Seats | Gains | Losses | Net gain/loss | Seats % | Votes % | Votes | +/− |
|---|---|---|---|---|---|---|---|---|
| Labour | 18 | 0 | 0 | 0 | 62.1 | 48.2 | 53,382 | +2.0 |
| Conservative | 11 | 0 | 0 | 0 | 37.9 | 47.4 | 52,541 | -4.5 |
| Liberal | 0 | 0 | 0 | 0 | 0.0 | 3.7 | 4,139 | +2.2 |
| Communist | 0 | 0 | 0 | 0 | 0.0 | 0.6 | 664 | +0.2 |

The result had the following consequences for the total number of seats on the council after the elections:

| Party | Previous council | | New council | |
| Party | Cllr | Ald | Cllr | Ald |
|---|---|---|---|---|
| Labour | 51 | 17 | 51 | 17 |
| Conservatives | 33 | 11 | 33 | 11 |
| Total | 84 | 28 | 84 | 28 |
| Total | 112 | | 112 | |
| Working majority | 18 | 6 | 18 | 6 |
| Working majority | 24 | | 24 | |

== Ward results ==
Allerton
| Party | Candidate | Votes | % | ±% |
|---|---|---|---|---|
| Conservative | M. Mustill | 3,904 | 85.8 | −1.7 |
| Labour | E. Bell | 645 | 14.2 | +1.7 |
| Majority | | 3,259 | 71.6 | −3.5 |
| Turnout | | 4,549 | | |
| Conservative hold | | Swing | -1.7 | |

Armley
| Party | Candidate | Votes | % | ±% |
|---|---|---|---|---|
| Labour | J. Bissell | 2,022 | 55.8 | +1.4 |
| Conservative | J. Broomfield | 1,602 | 44.2 | +5.3 |
| Majority | | 420 | 11.6 | −3.8 |
| Turnout | | 3,624 | | |
| Labour hold | | Swing | -1.9 | |

Beeston
| Party | Candidate | Votes | % | ±% |
|---|---|---|---|---|
| Conservative | P. Woodward | 3,109 | 50.0 | −4.0 |
| Labour | A. Tallant | 3,108 | 50.0 | +4.0 |
| Majority | | 1 | 0.0 | −8.1 |
| Turnout | | 6,217 | | |
| Conservative hold | | Swing | -4.0 | |

Blenheim
| Party | Candidate | Votes | % | ±% |
|---|---|---|---|---|
| Labour | W. Merritt | 2,339 | 60.5 | +5.7 |
| Conservative | W. Murphy | 1,530 | 39.5 | −5.7 |
| Majority | | 809 | 20.9 | +11.4 |
| Turnout | | 3,869 | | |
| Labour hold | | Swing | +5.7 | |

Bramley
| Party | Candidate | Votes | % | ±% |
|---|---|---|---|---|
| Labour | W. Lord | 2,661 | 48.5 | +0.7 |
| Conservative | C. Dean | 1,984 | 36.2 | −4.6 |
| Liberal | R. Walker | 837 | 15.3 | +3.9 |
| Majority | | 677 | 12.3 | +5.3 |
| Turnout | | 5,482 | | |
| Labour hold | | Swing | +2.6 | |

Burmantofts
| Party | Candidate | Votes | % | ±% |
|---|---|---|---|---|
| Labour | G. Murray | 1,884 | 66.3 | +3.2 |
| Conservative | K. Wiggin | 958 | 33.7 | −3.2 |
| Majority | | 926 | 32.6 | +6.5 |
| Turnout | | 2,842 | | |
| Labour hold | | Swing | +3.2 | |

City
| Party | Candidate | Votes | % | ±% |
|---|---|---|---|---|
| Labour | E. Stubbs | 1,512 | 64.6 | +2.6 |
| Conservative | J. Dougray | 829 | 35.4 | −2.6 |
| Majority | | 683 | 29.2 | +5.2 |
| Turnout | | 2,341 | | |
| Labour hold | | Swing | +2.6 | |

Cross Gates
| Party | Candidate | Votes | % | ±% |
|---|---|---|---|---|
| Labour | A. Harrison | 2,657 | 63.3 | +5.6 |
| Conservative | J. Baldwin | 1,540 | 36.7 | −5.6 |
| Majority | | 1,117 | 26.6 | +11.3 |
| Turnout | | 4,197 | | |
| Labour hold | | Swing | +5.6 | |

East Hunslet
| Party | Candidate | Votes | % | ±% |
|---|---|---|---|---|
| Labour | E. Kavanagh | 2,011 | 73.5 | +0.2 |
| Conservative | B. Watson | 724 | 26.5 | −0.2 |
| Majority | | 1,287 | 47.1 | +0.4 |
| Turnout | | 2,735 | | |
| Labour hold | | Swing | +0.2 | |

Far Headingley
| Party | Candidate | Votes | % | ±% |
|---|---|---|---|---|
| Conservative | G. Dovenor | 3,702 | 79.3 | −4.2 |
| Labour | E. Holmes | 969 | 20.7 | +4.2 |
| Majority | | 2,733 | 58.5 | −8.5 |
| Turnout | | 4,671 | | |
| Conservative hold | | Swing | -4.2 | |

Halton
| Party | Candidate | Votes | % | ±% |
|---|---|---|---|---|
| Conservative | P. Dobson | 3,446 | 76.6 | −2.2 |
| Labour | J. Marshall | 1,051 | 23.4 | +2.2 |
| Majority | | 2,395 | 53.3 | −4.3 |
| Turnout | | 4,497 | | |
| Conservative hold | | Swing | -2.2 | |

Harehills
| Party | Candidate | Votes | % | ±% |
|---|---|---|---|---|
| Conservative | B. Gardener | 2,305 | 52.4 | −7.2 |
| Labour | R. Sedler | 2,091 | 47.6 | +7.2 |
| Majority | | 214 | 4.9 | −14.5 |
| Turnout | | 4,396 | | |
| Conservative hold | | Swing | -7.2 | |

Holbeck
| Party | Candidate | Votes | % | ±% |
|---|---|---|---|---|
| Labour | G. Bray | 2,082 | 61.1 | −4.8 |
| Conservative | D. Stewart | 722 | 21.2 | −13.0 |
| Liberal | John Brian Meeks | 605 | 17.7 | +17.7 |
| Majority | | 1,360 | 39.9 | +8.2 |
| Turnout | | 3,409 | | |
| Labour hold | | Swing | +4.1 | |

Hunslet Carr
| Party | Candidate | Votes | % | ±% |
|---|---|---|---|---|
| Labour | W. Parker | 2,020 | 92.1 | +18.5 |
| Communist | E. Moore | 174 | 7.9 | +3.9 |
| Majority | | 1,846 | 84.1 | +32.9 |
| Turnout | | 2,194 | | |
| Labour hold | | Swing | +7.3 | |

Hyde Park
| Party | Candidate | Votes | % | ±% |
|---|---|---|---|---|
| Conservative | H. Walmsley | 2,916 | 68.1 | −3.1 |
| Conservative | F. Hall | 2,873 | | |
| Labour | A. Malcolm | 1,365 | 31.9 | +3.1 |
| Labour | N. Davy | 1,363 | | |
| Majority | | 1,508 | 36.2 | −6.2 |
| Turnout | | 4,281 | | |
| Conservative hold | | Swing | -3.1 | |

Kirkstall
| Party | Candidate | Votes | % | ±% |
|---|---|---|---|---|
| Labour | D. Matthews | 2,945 | 61.0 | +5.0 |
| Conservative | E. Lucas | 1,879 | 39.0 | −5.0 |
| Majority | | 1,066 | 22.1 | +10.0 |
| Turnout | | 4,824 | | |
| Labour hold | | Swing | +5.0 | |

Meanwood
| Party | Candidate | Votes | % | ±% |
|---|---|---|---|---|
| Conservative | T. Kirkby | 3,466 | 75.7 | +0.9 |
| Labour | F. Woolhouse | 1,115 | 24.3 | −0.9 |
| Majority | | 2,351 | 51.3 | +1.8 |
| Turnout | | 4,581 | | |
| Conservative hold | | Swing | -0.9 | |

Middleton
| Party | Candidate | Votes | % | ±% |
|---|---|---|---|---|
| Labour | J. Binns | 1,918 | 85.4 | +7.8 |
| Conservative | E. Bailey | 328 | 14.6 | −7.8 |
| Majority | | 1,590 | 70.8 | +15.6 |
| Turnout | | 2,246 | | |
| Labour hold | | Swing | +7.8 | |

Moortown
| Party | Candidate | Votes | % | ±% |
|---|---|---|---|---|
| Conservative | L. Henson | 3,695 | 77.6 | +0.8 |
| Labour | L. Steele | 1,064 | 22.4 | −0.8 |
| Majority | | 2,631 | 55.3 | +1.6 |
| Turnout | | 4,759 | | |
| Conservative hold | | Swing | +0.8 | |

Osmondthorpe
| Party | Candidate | Votes | % | ±% |
|---|---|---|---|---|
| Labour | L. Walsh | 2,628 | 75.3 | +3.5 |
| Conservative | L. Ideson | 862 | 24.7 | −3.5 |
| Majority | | 1,766 | 50.6 | +7.1 |
| Turnout | | 3,490 | | |
| Labour hold | | Swing | +3.5 | |

Potternewton
| Party | Candidate | Votes | % | ±% |
|---|---|---|---|---|
| Conservative | A. Coleman | 1,866 | 60.9 | −1.8 |
| Labour | B. Atha | 1,041 | 34.0 | +1.0 |
| Communist | S. Bloom | 156 | 5.1 | +0.8 |
| Majority | | 825 | 26.9 | −2.7 |
| Turnout | | 3,063 | | |
| Conservative hold | | Swing | -1.4 | |

Richmond Hill
| Party | Candidate | Votes | % | ±% |
|---|---|---|---|---|
| Labour | W. Cain | 1,416 | 76.7 | −2.1 |
| Conservative | J. Ashworth | 429 | 23.3 | +2.1 |
| Majority | | 987 | 53.5 | −4.2 |
| Turnout | | 1,845 | | |
| Labour hold | | Swing | -2.1 | |

Roundhay
| Party | Candidate | Votes | % | ±% |
|---|---|---|---|---|
| Conservative | H. Jowitt | 3,362 | 70.7 | −1.1 |
| Labour | P. Taylor | 1,391 | 29.3 | +1.1 |
| Majority | | 1,971 | 41.5 | −2.1 |
| Turnout | | 4,753 | | |
| Conservative hold | | Swing | -1.1 | |

Stanningley
| Party | Candidate | Votes | % | ±% |
|---|---|---|---|---|
| Labour | F. Kennally | 2,546 | 49.4 | +0.0 |
| Conservative | D. Vickers | 1,584 | 30.7 | −11.1 |
| Liberal | J. Grimshaw | 1,022 | 19.8 | +11.1 |
| Majority | | 962 | 18.7 | +11.1 |
| Turnout | | 5,152 | | |
| Labour hold | | Swing | +5.5 | |

Wellington
| Party | Candidate | Votes | % | ±% |
|---|---|---|---|---|
| Labour | J. Underwood | 2,142 | 76.7 | +9.5 |
| Liberal | Walter Holdsworth | 513 | 18.4 | +9.0 |
| Communist | J. Wheatley | 137 | 4.9 | −0.8 |
| Majority | | 1,629 | 58.3 | +8.8 |
| Turnout | | 2,792 | | |
| Labour hold | | Swing | +0.2 | |

Westfield
| Party | Candidate | Votes | % | ±% |
|---|---|---|---|---|
| Labour | Stan Cohen | 2,434 | 53.6 | +5.0 |
| Conservative | May Sexton | 1,674 | 36.9 | −14.5 |
| Liberal | H. Burridge | 432 | 9.5 | +9.5 |
| Majority | | 760 | 16.7 | +14.0 |
| Turnout | | 4,540 | | |
| Labour hold | | Swing | +9.7 | |

Woodhouse
| Party | Candidate | Votes | % | ±% |
|---|---|---|---|---|
| Labour | H. Bretherick | 1,862 | 49.6 | −7.3 |
| Conservative | L. Francis | 1,693 | 45.1 | +2.0 |
| Communist | F. Slaughter | 197 | 5.3 | +5.3 |
| Majority | | 169 | 4.5 | −9.3 |
| Turnout | | 3,752 | | |
| Labour hold | | Swing | -4.6 | |

Wortley
| Party | Candidate | Votes | % | ±% |
|---|---|---|---|---|
| Labour | W. Smart | 2,463 | 43.8 | −4.3 |
| Conservative | P. Stubley | 2,432 | 43.2 | −8.6 |
| Liberal | D. Boden | 730 | 13.0 | +13.0 |
| Majority | | 31 | 0.6 | −3.2 |
| Turnout | | 5,625 | | |
| Labour hold | | Swing | +2.1 | |
