= 1953 Leeds City Council election =

English local election

The 1953 Leeds municipal elections were held on Thursday 7 May 1953, with one third of the council as well as a vacancy in Richmond Hill to be elected.

Winning control of Leeds was one of Labour's highlights in a night that seen them make gains across the country. Whilst there was a swing away from Labour to the Conservatives of over four percent from the previous year's high benchmark, Labour were able to repeat most of the gains they achieved the year before, with the two exceptions being Armley - a seat they already held - and Beeston, which the Tories managed to hold by sixty-six votes this time around. In total they gained seven seats, replacing the Tories slim majority of two with a majority of twelve. Turnout continued its trend downwards with a post-war low of 41.4%.

== Election result ==
Leeds local election result 1953
Party	Seats	Gains	Losses	Net gain/loss	Seats %	Votes %	Votes	+/−
Labour	19	7	0	+7	65.5	52.5	78,259	-4.0
Conservative	10	0	7	-7	34.5	46.7	69,560	+4.2
Liberal	0	0	0	0	0.0	0.6	923	-0.2
Communist	0	0	0	0	0.0	0.2	294	+0.1

The result had the following consequences for the total number of seats on the council after the elections:

Party	Previous council		New council	
Party	Cllr	Ald	Cllr	Ald
Labour	41	14	48	14
Conservatives	43	14	36	14
Total	84	28	84	28
Total	112		112	
Working majority	-2	0	12	0
Working majority	-2		12	

== Ward results ==
Allerton
Party	Candidate	Votes	%	±%
Conservative	M. Mustill	5,260	85.2	+1.3
Labour	W. Stoner	917	14.8	−1.3
Majority		4,343	70.3	+2.6
Turnout		6,177		
Conservative hold		Swing	+1.3	

Armley
Party	Candidate	Votes	%	±%
Labour	J. Hodgson	3,815	61.3	−0.1
Conservative	J. Longstaff	2,407	38.7	+0.1
Majority		1,408	22.6	−0.2
Turnout		6,222		
Labour hold		Swing	-0.1	

Beeston
Party	Candidate	Votes	%	±%
Conservative	P. Woodward	3,810	50.4	+1.5
Labour	S. Binns	3,744	49.6	−1.5
Majority		66	0.9	−1.2
Turnout		7,554		
Conservative hold		Swing	+1.5	

Blenheim
Party	Candidate	Votes	%	±%
Labour	W. Merritt	3,144	56.9	−0.6
Conservative	K. Davison	2,386	43.1	+0.6
Majority		758	13.7	−1.2
Turnout		5,530		
Labour gain from Conservative		Swing	-0.6	

Bramley
Party	Candidate	Votes	%	±%
Labour	W. Lord	3,285	53.4	−6.6
Conservative	B. Pearce	2,862	46.6	+6.6
Majority		423	6.9	−13.1
Turnout		6,147		
Labour gain from Conservative		Swing	-6.6	

Burmantofts
Party	Candidate	Votes	%	±%
Labour	G. Murray	2,832	71.1	−3.7
Conservative	K. Platts	1,150	28.9	+3.7
Majority		1,682	42.2	−7.5
Turnout		3,982		
Labour hold		Swing	-3.7	

City
Party	Candidate	Votes	%	±%
Labour	E. Stubbs	2,449	69.3	+0.4
Conservative	N. Kay	1,083	30.7	−0.4
Majority		1,366	38.7	+0.9
Turnout		3,532		
Labour hold		Swing	+0.4	

Cross Gates
Party	Candidate	Votes	%	±%
Labour	A. Harrison	3,181	66.3	−3.8
Conservative	W. Tull	1,618	33.7	+3.8
Majority		1,563	32.6	−7.6
Turnout		4,799		
Labour gain from Conservative		Swing	-3.8	

East Hunslet
Party	Candidate	Votes	%	±%
Labour	E. Kavanagh	3,064	75.1	−7.6
Conservative	G. Hewdey	1,017	24.9	+7.6
Majority		2,047	50.2	−15.1
Turnout		4,081		
Labour hold		Swing	-7.6	

Far Headingley
Party	Candidate	Votes	%	±%
Conservative	G. Dovenor	4,112	82.1	+3.1
Labour	J. Bissell	897	17.9	−3.1
Majority		3,215	64.2	+6.2
Turnout		5,009		
Conservative hold		Swing	+3.1	

Halton
Party	Candidate	Votes	%	±%
Conservative	P. Dodson	3,933	72.7	+6.3
Labour	A. Vickers	1,476	27.3	−2.4
Majority		2,457	45.4	+8.7
Turnout		5,409		
Conservative hold		Swing	+4.3	

Harehills
Party	Candidate	Votes	%	±%
Conservative	B. Garden	2,918	53.6	+2.4
Labour	D. Gabb	2,529	46.4	−2.4
Majority		389	7.1	+4.7
Turnout		5,447		
Conservative hold		Swing	+2.4	

Holbeck
Party	Candidate	Votes	%	±%
Labour	G. Bray	3,545	64.3	−5.0
Conservative	S. Ristron	1,384	25.1	+1.6
Liberal	K. Heald	582	10.6	+3.4
Majority		2,161	39.2	−6.7
Turnout		5,511		
Labour hold		Swing	-3.3	

Hunslet Carr
Party	Candidate	Votes	%	±%
Labour	W. Parker	3,408	75.1	−5.0
Conservative	N. Cooke	942	20.8	+3.9
Communist	R. Wilkinson	185	4.1	+1.2
Majority		2,466	54.4	−8.9
Turnout		4,535		
Labour hold		Swing	-4.4	

Hyde Park
Party	Candidate	Votes	%	±%
Conservative	H. Walmsley	3,402	63.4	+3.4
Labour	I. Calvert	1,965	36.6	−3.4
Majority		1,437	26.8	+6.8
Turnout		5,367		
Conservative hold		Swing	+3.4	

Kirkstall
Party	Candidate	Votes	%	±%
Labour	D. Matthews	4,446	62.8	−0.3
Conservative	R. Neill	2,628	37.2	+5.2
Majority		1,818	25.7	−5.5
Turnout		7,074		
Labour hold		Swing	-2.7	

Meanwood
Party	Candidate	Votes	%	±%
Conservative	F. Carter	4,231	69.0	+0.9
Labour	J. Hedley	1,900	31.0	−0.9
Majority		2,331	38.0	+1.7
Turnout		6,131		
Conservative hold		Swing	+0.9	

Middleton
Party	Candidate	Votes	%	±%
Labour	S. Hand	3,510	85.3	−4.4
Conservative	F. Stubley	604	14.7	+4.4
Majority		2,906	70.6	−8.9
Turnout		4,114		
Labour hold		Swing	-4.4	

Moortown
Party	Candidate	Votes	%	±%
Conservative	L. Henson	4,179	70.2	−2.5
Labour	R. Hyams	1,771	29.8	+2.5
Majority		2,408	40.5	−4.9
Turnout		2,408		
Conservative hold		Swing	-2.5	

Osmondthorpe
Party	Candidate	Votes	%	±%
Labour	L. Walsh	3,690	79.5	−3.5
Conservative	D. Bradley	954	20.5	+3.5
Majority		2,736	58.9	−7.1
Turnout		4,644		
Labour hold		Swing	-3.5	

Potternewton
Party	Candidate	Votes	%	±%
Conservative	E. Coleman	2,460	61.3	+5.6
Labour	F. Howard	1,550	38.7	−5.6
Majority		910	22.7	+11.1
Turnout		4,010		
Conservative hold		Swing	+5.6	

Richmond Hill
Party	Candidate	Votes	%	±%
Labour	W. Cain	2,838	80.0	−5.0
Labour	W. Fowler	2,728		
Conservative	W. Clayton	710	20.0	+5.0
Conservative	H. Harwood	585		
Majority		2,018	60.0	−10.0
Turnout		3,548		
Labour hold		Swing		
Labour hold		Swing	-5.0	

Roundhay
Party	Candidate	Votes	%	±%
Conservative	H. Jowitt	4,409	66.6	+7.3
Labour	E. Morris	2,207	33.4	−7.3
Majority		2,202	33.3	+14.6
Turnout		6,616		
Conservative hold		Swing	+7.3	

Stanningley
Party	Candidate	Votes	%	±%
Labour	P. Kennally	3,059	51.8	−7.5
Conservative	F. Ayres	2,850	48.2	+7.5
Majority		209	3.5	−15.1
Turnout		5,909		
Labour gain from Conservative		Swing	-7.5	

Wellington
Party	Candidate	Votes	%	±%
Labour	J. Underwood	3,461	72.7	−3.1
Conservative	J. Palmer	848	17.8	−0.2
Liberal	Harry Burbridge	341	7.2	+2.7
Communist	F. Warburton	109	2.3	+0.7
Majority		2,613	54.9	−2.9
Turnout		4,759		
Labour hold		Swing	-1.4	

Westfield
Party	Candidate	Votes	%	±%
Labour	Stan Cohen	2,916	56.7	+1.7
Conservative	G. Appleby	2,228	43.3	−1.7
Majority		688	13.4	+3.4
Turnout		5,144		
Labour gain from Conservative		Swing	+1.7	

Woodhouse
Party	Candidate	Votes	%	±%
Labour	H. Bretherick	3,456	59.9	−5.0
Conservative	H. Stott	2,318	40.1	+5.0
Majority		1,138	19.7	−10.1
Turnout		5,774		
Labour gain from Conservative		Swing	-5.0	

Wortley
Party	Candidate	Votes	%	±%
Labour	W. Smart	3,204	52.9	−2.4
Conservative	Charles Horner	2,857	47.1	+2.4
Majority		347	5.7	−4.8
Turnout		6,061		
Labour gain from Conservative		Swing	-2.4	
