= 1958 Leeds City Council election =

English local election

The 1958 Leeds municipal elections were held on Thursday 10 April 1958, with one third of the seats and a double vacancy in Bramley to be elected.

Labour achieved a further swing of 0.3%, to take two more seats from the Conservatives. The two gains were in Westfield - where the incumbents 7.5% swing was not enough to hold on - and Wortley, with Labour narrowly gaining on a 78-vote majority as the main beneficiaries of the Liberal absence this time around. As well as those two gains, Labour gained one in the new aldermen division, increasing their majority on the council to 34. A notable feat of the election was the Liberals managing to push the Conservatives into third in the two wards of Holbeck and Middleton - a post-war first. Turnout rose by a percentage point on the previous year, to 37.2%.

== Election result ==
Leeds local election result 1958
Party	Seats	Gains	Losses	Net gain/loss	Seats %	Votes %	Votes	+/−
Labour	19	2	0	+2	65.5	49.8	64,563	-0.4
Conservative	10	0	2	-2	34.5	46.1	59,770	-0.3
Liberal	0	0	0	0	0.0	3.7	4,739	+0.6
Communist	0	0	0	0	0.0	0.4	485	+0.1

The result had the following consequences for the total number of seats on the council after the elections:

Party	Previous council		New council	
Party	Cllr	Ald	Cllr	Ald
Labour	53	17	55	18
Conservatives	31	11	29	10
Total	84	28	84	28
Total	112		112	
Working majority	22	6	26	8
Working majority	28		34	

== Ward results ==
Allerton
Party	Candidate	Votes	%	±%
Conservative	H. Drake	4,376	86.0	−0.7
Labour	J. Marshall	715	14.0	+0.7
Majority		3,661	72.0	−1.4
Turnout		5,091		
Conservative hold		Swing	-0.7	

Armley
Party	Candidate	Votes	%	±%
Labour	K. Cohen	2,820	58.5	+1.8
Conservative	J. Broomfield	2,002	41.5	−1.8
Majority		818	17.0	+3.6
Turnout		4,822		
Labour hold		Swing	+1.8	

Beeston
Party	Candidate	Votes	%	±%
Conservative	L. Snape	3,174	42.8	−0.2
Labour	N. Billington	3,084	41.6	−5.6
Liberal	H. Passmore	1,154	15.6	+5.8
Majority		90	1.2	−3.0
Turnout		7,412		
Conservative hold		Swing	+2.7	

Blenheim
Party	Candidate	Votes	%	±%
Labour	J. Wallbanks	2,146	69.0	+1.4
Conservative	J. Ashworth	962	31.0	−1.4
Majority		1,184	38.1	+2.8
Turnout		3,108		
Labour hold		Swing	+1.4	

Bramley
Party	Candidate	Votes	%	±%
Labour	Eric Atkinson	3,051	50.4	−4.0
Labour	W. Tate	2,713		
Conservative	C. Dean	2,095	34.6	+2.5
Conservative	H. Pickering	1,860		
Liberal	John Humphrey Morrish	905	15.0	+1.5
Liberal	George Petch	836		
Majority		618	15.8	−6.5
Turnout		6,051		
Labour hold		Swing		
Labour hold		Swing	-3.2	

Burmantofts
Party	Candidate	Votes	%	±%
Labour	G. Lloyd	2,367	72.2	+1.5
Conservative	H. Robinson	912	27.8	−1.5
Majority		1,455	44.4	+3.1
Turnout		3,279		
Labour hold		Swing	+1.5	

City
Party	Candidate	Votes	%	±%
Labour	J. Whitehead	1,568	67.3	+2.4
Conservative	B. Emmett	761	32.7	−2.4
Majority		807	34.7	+4.9
Turnout		2,329		
Labour hold		Swing	+2.4	

Cross Gates
Party	Candidate	Votes	%	±%
Labour	F. Booth	3,700	68.8	+6.9
Conservative	F. Hodges	1,677	31.2	−6.9
Majority		2,023	37.6	+13.8
Turnout		5,377		
Labour hold		Swing	+6.9	

East Hunslet
Party	Candidate	Votes	%	±%
Labour	M. Fish	2,659	76.8	+1.5
Conservative	B. Watson	804	23.2	−1.5
Majority		1,855	53.6	+3.0
Turnout		3,463		
Labour hold		Swing	+1.5	

Far Headingley
Party	Candidate	Votes	%	±%
Conservative	W. Hey	4,451	78.0	+3.3
Labour	G. Brogden	1,254	22.0	−3.3
Majority		3,197	56.0	+6.5
Turnout		5,705		
Conservative hold		Swing	+3.3	

Halton
Party	Candidate	Votes	%	±%
Conservative	C. Watson	3,857	75.3	−1.9
Labour	N. Harding	1,267	24.7	+1.9
Majority		2,590	50.5	−3.8
Turnout		5,124		
Conservative hold		Swing	-1.9	

Harehills
Party	Candidate	Votes	%	±%
Conservative	Lawrence Turnbull	3,400	53.5	+4.0
Labour	J. Klineberg	2,951	46.5	−4.0
Majority		449	7.1	+6.1
Turnout		6,351		
Conservative hold		Swing	+4.0	

Holbeck
Party	Candidate	Votes	%	±%
Labour	W. Jones	2,334	62.4	+1.3
Liberal	B. Fearnley	768	20.5	+3.3
Conservative	K. Orton	639	17.1	−4.7
Majority		1,566	41.9	+2.6
Turnout		3,741		
Labour hold		Swing	-1.0	

Hunslet Carr
Party	Candidate	Votes	%	±%
Labour	J. Hodgkinson	2,639	75.5	−4.9
Conservative	B. Morland	385	11.0	−5.1
Liberal	J.T. Hill	331	9.5	+9.5
Communist	E. Moore	141	4.0	+0.6
Majority		2,254	64.5	+0.2
Turnout		3,496		
Labour hold		Swing	+0.1	

Hyde Park
Party	Candidate	Votes	%	±%
Conservative	F. Hall	2,915	58.0	−2.3
Labour	E. Coward	2,115	42.0	+2.3
Majority		800	15.9	−4.6
Turnout		5,030		
Conservative hold		Swing	-2.3	

Kirkstall
Party	Candidate	Votes	%	±%
Labour	Albert Smith	3,195	58.9	−2.0
Conservative	E. Lodge	2,225	41.1	+2.0
Majority		970	17.9	−4.0
Turnout		5,420		
Labour hold		Swing	-2.0	

Meanwood
Party	Candidate	Votes	%	±%
Conservative	V. Cardno	3,696	72.6	−1.3
Labour	E. Webber	1,396	27.4	+1.3
Majority		2,300	45.2	−2.6
Turnout		5,092		
Conservative hold		Swing	-1.3	

Middleton
Party	Candidate	Votes	%	±%
Labour	Harold Watson	2,511	73.0	−10.1
Liberal	G. Houghton	438	12.7	+12.7
Conservative	A. Hartley	350	10.2	−6.6
Communist	R. Wilkinson	139	4.0	+4.0
Majority		2,073	60.3	−6.1
Turnout		3,438		
Labour hold		Swing	-11.4	

Moortown
Party	Candidate	Votes	%	±%
Conservative	John Watson	4,435	76.8	+2.6
Labour	L. Steele	1,337	23.2	−2.6
Majority		3,098	53.7	+5.3
Turnout		5,772		
Conservative hold		Swing	+2.6	

Osmondthorpe
Party	Candidate	Votes	%	±%
Labour	G. Addlestone	2,617	76.9	−0.1
Conservative	L. Ideson	784	23.1	+0.1
Majority		1,833	53.9	−0.2
Turnout		3,401		
Labour hold		Swing	-0.1	

Potternewton
Party	Candidate	Votes	%	±%
Conservative	Sydney Symmond	2,131	61.8	+1.4
Labour	V. Zermanski	1,316	38.2	−1.4
Majority		815	23.6	+2.8
Turnout		3,447		
Conservative hold		Swing	+1.4	

Richmond Hill
Party	Candidate	Votes	%	±%
Labour	A. King	1,698	80.0	+3.0
Conservative	H. Flockton	424	20.0	−3.0
Majority		1,274	60.0	+5.9
Turnout		2,122		
Labour hold		Swing	+3.0	

Roundhay
Party	Candidate	Votes	%	±%
Conservative	Allan Bretherick	3,957	67.5	−0.2
Labour	D. Yelland	1,902	32.5	+0.2
Majority		2,055	35.1	−0.5
Turnout		5,859		
Conservative hold		Swing	-0.2	

Stanningley
Party	Candidate	Votes	%	±%
Labour	H. Waterman	2,897	51.9	+1.6
Conservative	A. Vickers	1,541	27.6	−3.6
Liberal	J. Grimshaw	1,143	20.5	+2.0
Majority		1,356	24.3	+5.3
Turnout		5,581		
Labour hold		Swing	+2.6	

Wellington
Party	Candidate	Votes	%	±%
Labour	N. Barrett	2,578	79.2	−11.1
Conservative	F. Stubley	470	14.4	+14.4
Communist	G. Hodgson	205	6.3	−3.4
Majority		2,108	64.8	−15.9
Turnout		3,253		
Labour hold		Swing	-12.7	

Westfield
Party	Candidate	Votes	%	±%
Labour	V. Whelan	2,554	52.1	−3.9
Conservative	L. Lyons	2,349	47.9	+11.1
Majority		205	4.2	−15.0
Turnout		4,903		
Labour gain from Conservative		Swing	-7.5	

Woodhouse
Party	Candidate	Votes	%	±%
Labour	P. Taylor	2,471	59.9	−0.4
Conservative	A. Chadwick	1,655	40.1	+0.4
Majority		816	19.8	−0.8
Turnout		4,126		
Labour hold		Swing	-0.4	

Wortley
Party	Candidate	Votes	%	±%
Labour	Ernest Morris	3,421	50.6	+5.7
Conservative	D. Wolstenholme	3,343	49.4	+1.5
Majority		78	1.2	−1.9
Turnout		6,764		
Labour gain from Conservative		Swing	+2.1	
