= 1951 Leeds City Council election =

1951 English local government election

The 1951 Leeds municipal elections were held on Thursday 10 May 1951, with boundary changes prompting the whole council's re-election. With the new wards the council grew by a further two (two additional wards also represented an increase of six councillors and two aldermen), as thirteen newly created wards replaced the eleven that were abolished:

Abolished:

- Armley & Wortley
- Central
- Cross Gates & Temple Newsam
- Farnley & Wortley
- Holbeck North
- Holbeck South
- Hunslet Carr & Middleton
- Mill Hill & South
- North
- Upper Armley
- West Hunslet

Created:

- Allerton
- Armley
- City
- Cross Gates
- Halton
- Holbeck
- Hunslet Carr
- Meanwood
- Middleton
- Moortown
- Stanningley
- Wellington
- Wortley

There was a three percent swing from Labour to the Conservatives (as compared to 1949 – swings from 1950's distorted results show much larger swings as seen below) on the night, delivering the Conservatives control of the council with a 30-seat majority. Turnout naturally rose from the previous year's scarcely contested election, to an above average figure of 45.9%.

== Election result ==
Leeds local election result 1951
Party	Seats	Gains	Losses	Net gain/loss	Seats %	Votes %	Votes	+/−
Conservative	53	0	0	0	63.1	55.8	93,031	+16.8
Labour	31	0	0	0	36.9	39.8	66,370	-11.4
Liberal	0	0	0	0	0.0	4.0	6,692	-0.7
Communist	0	0	0	0	0.0	0.4	703	-4.7

The result had the following consequences for the total number of seats on the council after the elections:

Party	Previous council		New council	
Party	Cllr	Ald	Cllr	Ald
Conservatives	36	12	53	18
Labour	42	14	31	10
Total	78	26	84	28
Total	104		112	
Working majority	-6	-2	22	8
Working majority	-8		30	

== Ward results ==
Allerton
Party	Candidate	Votes	%	±%
Conservative	E. Wooler	7,130	78.6	N/A
Conservative	D. Murphy	6,915		
Conservative	H. Drake	6,879		
Labour	Ms. Mattison	1,057	11.6	N/A
Labour	A. Hammond	1,057		
Labour	Ms. Hammond	1,006		
Liberal	S. Lee	888	9.8	N/A
Majority		5,822	66.9	N/A
Turnout		9,075		N/A
Conservative win (new seat)				
Conservative win (new seat)				
Conservative win (new seat)				

Armley
Party	Candidate	Votes	%	±%
Conservative	E. Glover	3,278	46.2	N/A
Labour	J. Hodgson	3,159	44.5	N/A
Conservative	G. Atkinson	3,103		
Labour	E. Cohen	3,075		
Labour	P. Holmes	3,001		
Conservative	J. North	2,910		
Liberal	F. Johnson	658	9.3	N/A
Majority		28	1.7	N/A
Turnout		7,095		N/A
Conservative win (new seat)				
Labour win (new seat)				
Conservative win (new seat)				

Beeston
Party	Candidate	Votes	%	±%
Conservative	M. Collins	4,639	54.8	N/A
Conservative	P. Woodward	4,450		
Conservative	F. Gummersall	4,400		
Labour	S. Binns	3,131	37.0	N/A
Labour	T. Jessup	3,044		
Labour	F. Burnley	3,031		
Liberal	J. T. Ward	694	8.2	N/A
Liberal	F. Fearnley	489		
Liberal	Victor Louis Raymond Delepine	446		
Majority		1,269	17.8	N/A
Turnout		8,464		N/A
Conservative win (new seat)				
Conservative win (new seat)				
Conservative win (new seat)				

Blenheim
Party	Candidate	Votes	%	±%
Conservative	B. Lyons	3,032	55.0	N/A
Conservative	K. Davison	3,024		
Conservative	J. Butterfield	3,009		
Labour	J. Walsh	2,478	45.0	N/A
Labour	J. Wallbanks	2,472		
Labour	J. Wilkinson	2,450		
Majority		531	10.1	N/A
Turnout		5,510		N/A
Conservative win (new seat)				
Conservative win (new seat)				
Conservative win (new seat)				

Bramley
Party	Candidate	Votes	%	±%
Conservative	T. Bennett	3,276	46.3	N/A
Conservative	B. Pearce	3,227		
Conservative	H. Womersley	3,197		
Labour	E. Atkinson	2,870	40.5	N/A
Labour	A. Crossland	2,773		
Labour	A. Malcolm	2,559		
Liberal	A. Thompson	935	13.2	N/A
Majority		327	5.7	N/A
Turnout		7,081		N/A
Conservative win (new seat)				
Conservative win (new seat)				
Conservative win (new seat)				

Burmantofts
Party	Candidate	Votes	%	±%
Labour	W. Shutt	2,456	56.4	N/A
Labour	G. Murray	2,415		
Labour	W. Jackson	2,321		
Conservative	J. Sizer	1,895	43.6	N/A
Conservative	A. Clark	1,874		
Conservative	J. Crotty	1,865		
Majority		426	12.9	N/A
Turnout		4,351		N/A
Labour win (new seat)				
Labour win (new seat)				
Labour win (new seat)				

City
Party	Candidate	Votes	%	±%
Labour	F. Hirst	2,144	55.4	N/A
Labour	E. Stubbs	2,095		
Labour	E. Whitehead	2,066		
Conservative	R. Neill	1,723	44.6	N/A
Conservative	D. Crockett	1,689		
Conservative	T. Nipe	1,659		
Majority		343	10.9	N/A
Turnout		3,867		N/A
Labour win (new seat)				
Labour win (new seat)				
Labour win (new seat)				

Cross Gates
Party	Candidate	Votes	%	±%
Conservative	L. Demaine	2,246	51.4	N/A
Conservative	W. Tull	2,185		
Conservative	A. Ingram	2,169		
Labour	E. Booth	2,120	48.6	N/A
Labour	H. Wiseman	2,063		
Labour	W. Spence	2,059		
Majority		49	2.9	N/A
Turnout		4,366		N/A
Conservative win (new seat)				
Conservative win (new seat)				
Conservative win (new seat)				

East Hunslet
Party	Candidate	Votes	%	±%
Labour	F. Naylor	2,834	60.9	N/A
Labour	E. Kavanagh	2,736		
Labour	M. Fish	2,730		
Conservative	Ms. Kirwin	1,820	39.1	N/A
Conservative	K. Stead	1,716		
Conservative	G. Fagan	1,709		
Majority		910	21.8	N/A
Turnout		4,654		N/A
Labour win (new seat)				
Labour win (new seat)				
Labour win (new seat)				

Far Headingley
Party	Candidate	Votes	%	±%
Conservative	W. Hargrave	5,060	84.4	N/A
Conservative	G. Dovenor	5,041		
Conservative	W. Hey	4,932		
Labour	D. Beevers	932	15.6	N/A
Majority		4,000	68.9	N/A
Turnout		5,992		N/A
Conservative win (new seat)				
Conservative win (new seat)				
Conservative win (new seat)				

Halton
Party	Candidate	Votes	%	±%
Conservative	J. Brocksbank	4,834	75.8	N/A
Conservative	P. Dodson	4,788		
Conservative	C. Watson	4,592		
Labour	A. Harrison	1,546	24.2	N/A
Labour	Ms. Naylor	1,290		
Majority		3,288	51.5	N/A
Turnout		6,380		N/A
Conservative win (new seat)				
Conservative win (new seat)				
Conservative win (new seat)				

Harehills
Party	Candidate	Votes	%	±%
Conservative	P. Crotty	3,861	66.0	N/A
Conservative	W. Power	3,787		
Conservative	L. Turnbull	3,766		
Labour	W. Cain	1,986	34.0	N/A
Labour	E. Simpson	1,939		
Labour	F. Symonds	1,887		
Majority		1,780	32.1	N/A
Turnout		5,847		N/A
Conservative win (new seat)				
Conservative win (new seat)				
Conservative win (new seat)				

Holbeck
Party	Candidate	Votes	%	±%
Labour	T. Smith	3,221	51.6	N/A
Labour	G. Bray	3,183		
Labour	W. Jones	3,105		
Conservative	J. Farrell	2,439	39.1	N/A
Conservative	I. Clayton	2,388		
Conservative	P. Glew	2,219		
Liberal	C. T. Howes	577	9.3	n/a
Liberal	J. T. Hill	522		
Liberal	Walter Holdsworth	497		
Majority		666	12.5	n/a
Turnout		6,237		N/A
Labour win (new seat)				
Labour win (new seat)				
Labour win (new seat)				

Hunslet Carr
Party	Candidate	Votes	%	±%
Labour	T. Ellison	3,297	57.6	N/A
Labour	A. Adamson	3,285		
Labour	J. Hodkinson	3,266		
Conservative	R. Horley	1,746	30.5	N/A
Conservative	J. Loades	1,659		
Conservative	C. Murgatroyd	1,657		
Liberal	A. Burrell	683	11.9	N/A
Majority		1,520	27.1	N/A
Turnout		5,726		N/A
Labour win (new seat)				
Labour win (new seat)				
Labour win (new seat)				

Hyde Park
Party	Candidate	Votes	%	±%
Conservative	H. McKay	4,396	64.3	N/A
Conservative	P. Hutchinson	4,351		
Conservative	F. Walker	4,240		
Labour	R. Whittaker	1,580	23.1	N/A
Liberal	Stanley Edward Graham	857	12.5	N/A
Majority		2,660	41.2	N/A
Turnout		6,833		N/A
Conservative win (new seat)				
Conservative win (new seat)				
Conservative win (new seat)				

Kirkstall
Party	Candidate	Votes	%	±%
Labour	A. Happold	3,318	46.3	N/A
Labour	D. Matthews	3,180		
Labour	A. Smith	3,110		
Conservative	C. Turnbull	3,090	43.1	N/A
Conservative	F. Cowell	3,076		
Conservative	J. Coles	2,976		
Liberal	L. Cooper	756	10.6	N/A
Liberal	G. Foster	432		
Majority		20	3.2	N/A
Turnout		7,164		N/A
Labour win (new seat)				
Labour win (new seat)				
Labour win (new seat)				

Meanwood
Party	Candidate	Votes	%	±%
Conservative	A. Pedley	5,451	77.8	N/A
Conservative	F. Carter	5,435		
Conservative	V. Cardno	5,414		
Labour	J. Huddleston	1,558	22.2	N/A
Labour	N. Davy	1,523		
Labour	A. Tong	1,506		
Majority		3,856	55.5	N/A
Turnout		7,009		N/A
Conservative win (new seat)				
Conservative win (new seat)				
Conservative win (new seat)				

Middleton
Party	Candidate	Votes	%	±%
Labour	A. Brown	3,113	69.4	N/A
Labour	S. Hand	3,098		
Labour	H. Watson	3,002		
Conservative	E. McQuire	1,370	30.6	N/A
Conservative	J. Wise	1,197		
Conservative	D. Redmond	1,173		
Majority		1,632	38.9	N/A
Turnout		4,483		N/A
Labour win (new seat)				
Labour win (new seat)				
Labour win (new seat)				

Moortown
Party	Candidate	Votes	%	±%
Conservative	A. Cummings	5,045	78.5	N/A
Conservative	H. Sellors	5,036		
Conservative	J. Watson	4,942		
Labour	M. Pearce	1,381	21.5	N/A
Majority		3,561	57.0	N/A
Turnout		6,426		N/A
Conservative win (new seat)				
Conservative win (new seat)				
Conservative win (new seat)				

Osmondthorpe
Party	Candidate	Votes	%	±%
Labour	J. Rafferty	3,695	66.2	N/A
Labour	L. Walsh	3,560		
Labour	F. Potter	3,520		
Conservative	N. Webster	1,887	33.8	N/A
Conservative	W. Brownridge	1,810		
Conservative	H. Howe	1,807		
Majority		1,633	32.4	N/A
Turnout		5,582		N/A
Labour win (new seat)				
Labour win (new seat)				
Labour win (new seat)				

Potternewton
Party	Candidate	Votes	%	±%
Conservative	J. Bidgood	3,113	64.0	N/A
Conservative	E. Coleman	3,041		
Conservative	C. Driver	2,952		
Labour	A. Sharp	1,397	28.7	N/A
Labour	H. Dawson	1,348		
Labour	J. Warwick	1,339		
Communist	B. Ramelson	357	7.3	N/A
Majority		1,555	35.3	N/A
Turnout		4,867		N/A
Conservative win (new seat)				
Conservative win (new seat)				
Conservative win (new seat)				

Richmond Hill
Party	Candidate	Votes	%	±%
Labour	Z. Fernandez	2,461	67.8	N/A
Labour	W. Fowler	2,414		
Labour	A. King	2,327		
Conservative	W. Clayton	1,169	32.2	N/A
Conservative	D. Hopkins	1,155		
Conservative	S. Tomlinson	1,086		
Majority		1,158	35.6	N/A
Turnout		3,630		N/A
Labour win (new seat)				
Labour win (new seat)				
Labour win (new seat)				

Roundhay
Party	Candidate	Votes	%	±%
Conservative	G. Monkman	5,902	73.8	N/A
Conservative	H. Jowitt	5,744		
Conservative	A. Bretherick	5,699		
Labour	S. Spencer	2,096	26.2	N/A
Majority		3,603	47.6	N/A
Turnout		7,998		N/A
Conservative win (new seat)				
Conservative win (new seat)				
Conservative win (new seat)				

Stanningley
Party	Candidate	Votes	%	±%
Conservative	A. Baker	3,427	56.2	N/A
Conservative	F. Ayres	3,409		
Conservative	T. Kirby	3,336		
Labour	W. Haswell	2,676	43.8	N/A
Labour	J. Barriff	2,618		
Labour	H. Waterman	2,617		
Majority		660	12.3	N/A
Turnout		6,103		N/A
Conservative win (new seat)				
Conservative win (new seat)				
Conservative win (new seat)				

Wellington
Party	Candidate	Votes	%	±%
Labour	A. Farrington	2,832	59.2	N/A
Labour	J. Underwood	2,735		
Labour	E. Youngman	2,667		
Conservative	J. Palmer	1,604	33.5	N/A
Conservative	G. Denman	1,558		
Conservative	D. Willis	1,463		
Communist	F. Warburton	346	7.2	N/A
Majority		1,063	25.7	N/A
Turnout		4,782		N/A
Labour win (new seat)				
Labour win (new seat)				
Labour win (new seat)				

Westfield
Party	Candidate	Votes	%	±%
Conservative	Ms. Lister	2,635	61.4	N/A
Conservative	G. Appleby	2,617		
Conservative	S. Webster	2,540		
Labour	G. Horsley	1,660	38.6	N/A
Labour	W. Parker	1,541		
Labour	H. Wright	1,520		
Majority		880	22.7	N/A
Turnout		4,295		N/A
Conservative win (new seat)				
Conservative win (new seat)				
Conservative win (new seat)				

Woodhouse
Party	Candidate	Votes	%	±%
Conservative	F. Winterburn	3,053	55.9	N/A
Conservative	H. Stott	3,051		
Conservative	B. Garden	2,952		
Labour	H. Vick	2,404	44.1	N/A
Labour	Ms. Clayden	2,363		
Labour	H. Bretherick	2,320		
Majority		548	11.8	N/A
Turnout		5,457		N/A
Conservative win (new seat)				
Conservative win (new seat)				
Conservative win (new seat)				

Wortley
Party	Candidate	Votes	%	±%
Conservative	Bertrand Mather	3,910	52.0	N/A
Conservative	Charles Horner	3,686		
Conservative	Mary Dowling	3,675		
Labour	Leonard Wilkinson	2,968	39.5	N/A
Labour	Edgar Robinson	2,965		
Labour	Harry Kinder	2,863		
Liberal	Robert Baldridge	644	8.6	N/A
Majority		707	12.5	N/A
Turnout		7,522		N/A
Conservative win (new seat)				
Conservative win (new seat)				
Conservative win (new seat)				
