= Bootie (bicycle) =

Folding bicycle

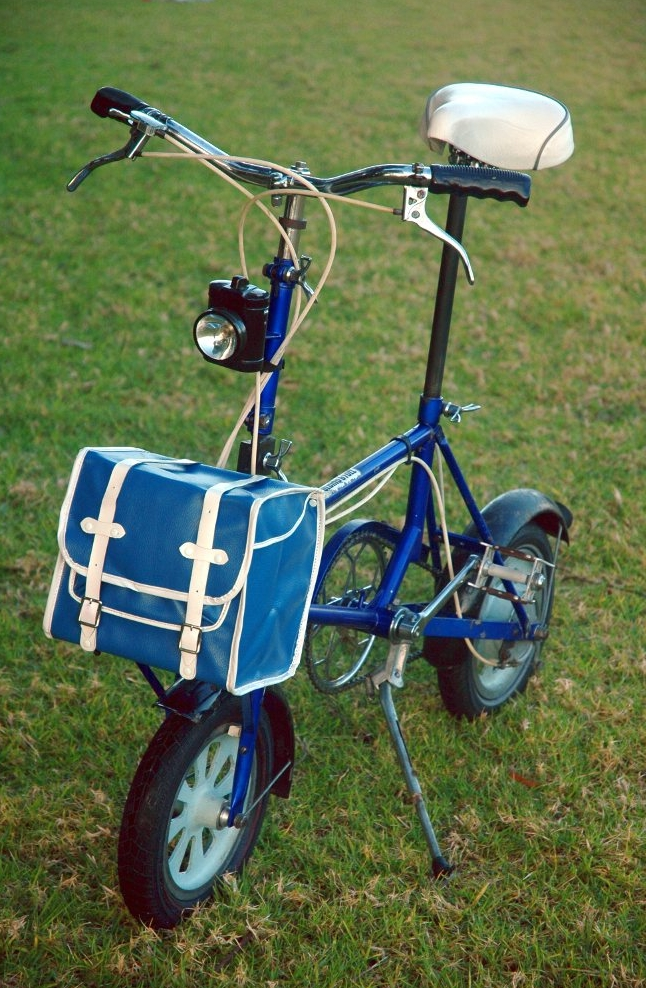
A second generation Bootie bicycle

The Bootie Folding Cycle, or 'Bootie', is a rare folding bicycle produced in West Yorkshire UK from 1965 to 1973.

== Manufacturer ==
The Bootie Folding Cycle was designed by Thomas Kitchin and made by F. T. Kitchin of Vickersdale Works, an old industrial estate in Grove Street, Stanningley, Pudsey.

F.T. Kitchin were general engineers who were in business for over 100 years. They have been described as relatively small, true 'jobbing' engineers who were willing to make, or 'invent', whatever wasn't generally available, but never big enough to develop their products in the way a larger firm would.

== Marketing ==
The Bootie was sold directly via advertising in the cycle press. In the December 1966/January 1967 issue of Cycletouring Magazine it was priced at £25.10.0 (inc. tax), delivered.

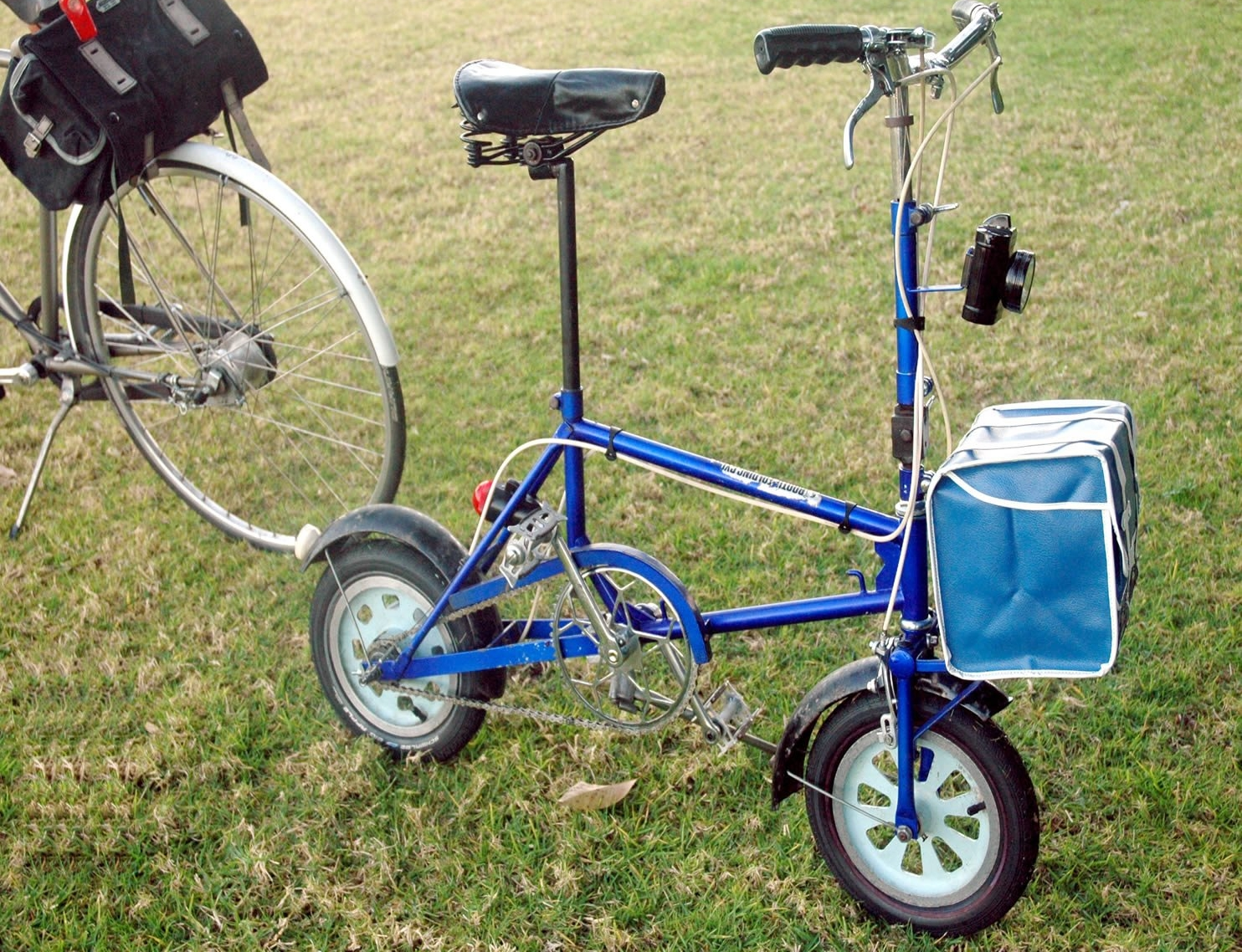
Comparison of Bootie with conventional bike

It was primarily designed for ‘last mile’ purposes, but the advertising also appealed to caravanners, boat owners, flat dwellers and fishermen. The slogan ‘As a dinghy is to a boat, so is the Bootie to a car’ was used to promote the Bootie.

The ‘Bootie’ name was chosen because the bike was designed to be small enough to store in the boot (trunk in American English) of a car.

== Design ==
Strictly speaking, the Bootie was not really a folding bike. More accurately, it was a very small, rigid-framed bike with folding handlebars and seat post. It was therefore a revival of a concept pioneered by the French ‘Le Petit Bi’ in the late 1930s. The Daewoo Shuttle is a more recent example of the type.

== Folding mechanism ==
The Bootie featured a then-unique way to fold the handlebars and seat out of the way. This comprised a solid steel, two-part hinge fitted midway on the steerer and seat tubes.

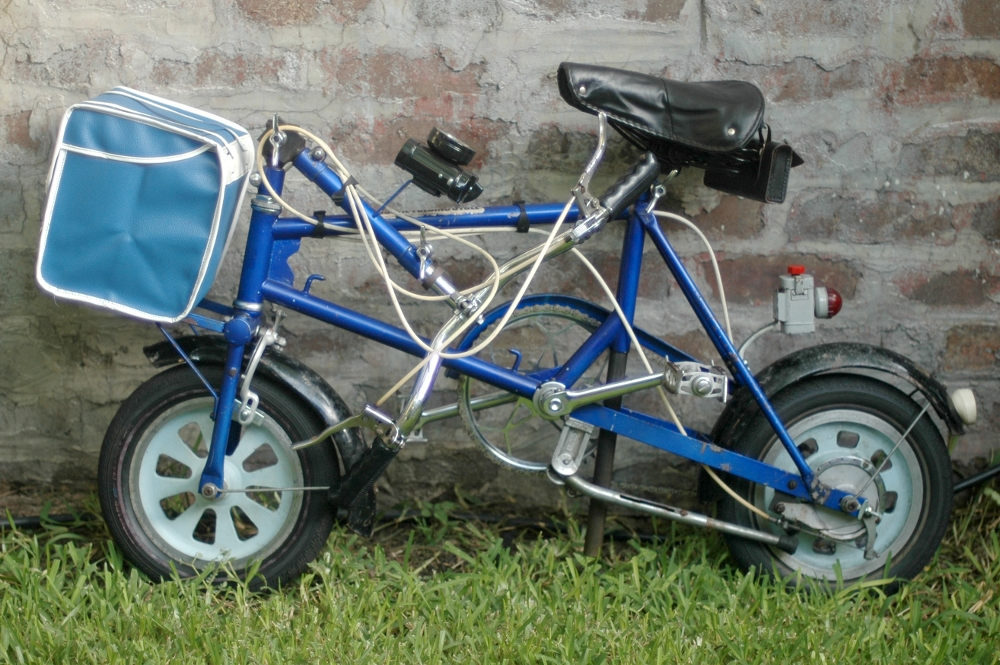
A folded Bootie

Each hinge was secured with a hand nut which, when loosened, allowed the upper part to be swung over the side of the frame. In the case of the steerer tube, loosening another hand nut allowed the handlebars to be rotated 90 degrees to fit snugly against the side of the bike.

Only the very earliest examples had both a hinged seat tube and handlebar stem. Within a year or two of introduction the hinged seat tube was replaced by a conventional seat tube with a long seat post that could be slid down or removed altogether. The lower end of the seat tube was open, and to the rear of the bottom bracket, to allow the seat post to slide all the way down.

With the change to a conventional seat tube the only part of the Bootie 'Folding' Cycle that actually folded was the steerer tube (i.e. the handlebars).

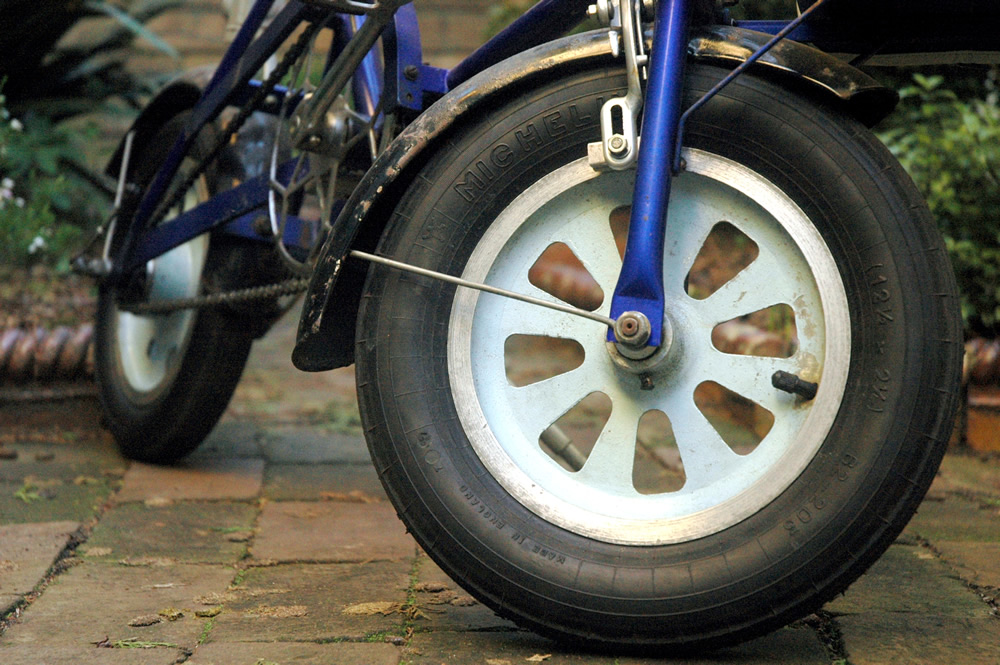
Original type 62 x 203 Michelin balloon tire on front wheel of Bootie Folding Cycle

== Equipment ==
The Bootie Folding Cycle came well equipped, with mudguards, a built-in luggage rack, front and rear lamp brackets and sidestand. The crankset is a steel, cottered mass market unit manufactured by Williams, and the handlebars and stem are conventional chrome plated steel. A black double-sprung mattress type saddle was fitted to the 500 mm long L-shaped seatpost. Booties were shod with Dunlop or Michelin ETRTO size 203 - 62, balloon-type tyres.

== Dimensions ==
The wheelbase was 76 cm (compared to around a metre for conventional bicycles), with an overall length of 120 cm with the foldable front rack extended. The Bootie weighed around 17 kg.

== Model history ==
The Bootie was produced for in two ‘generations’: the first from 1965 to 1968, the second from then until the end of production.

=== First generation ===
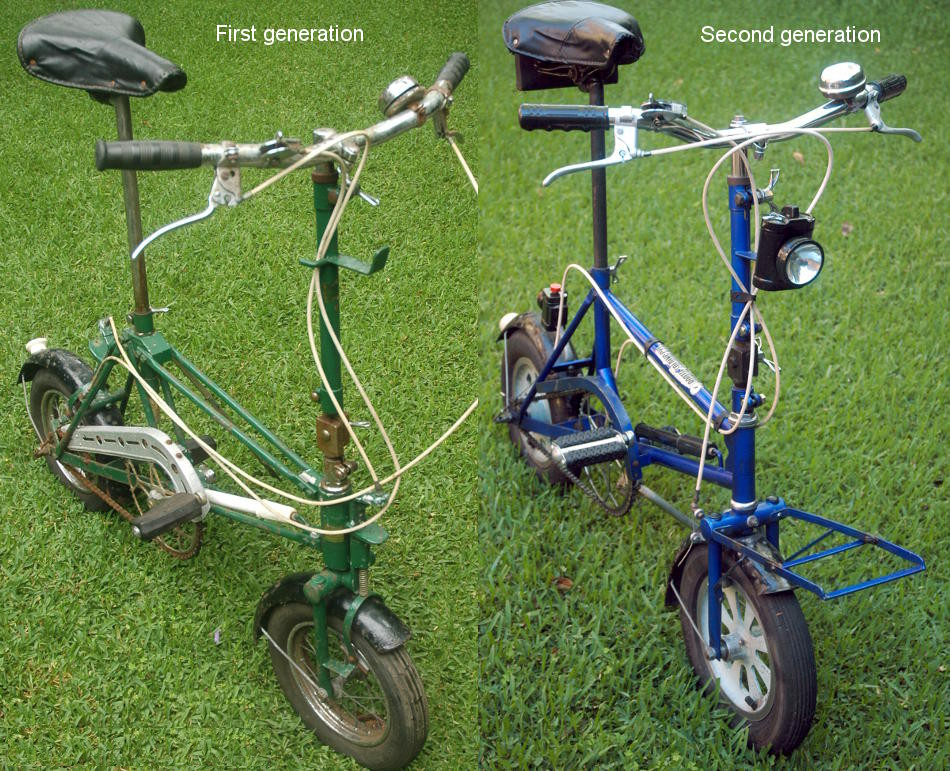
Comparison of first and second generation Bootie Folding Cycle

The frame of the first generation Bootie was made of pairs of half inch steel tubes, with the flattened tube ends bolted to aluminium head, saddle and bottom bracket castings. The chainstays were of flat steel strip.

The first generation bikes had wire wheels. Braking was by unique, Kitchin-made stirrup brakes designed with extra leverage to give more braking power than was otherwise available with the tiny wheels. A Sturmey Archer ‘AW’ three speed gear was fitted.

=== Second generation ===
The second generation Booties had a different frame and wheels. The frame was mostly of tubular steel without lugs, but the chainstays were still made of flat steel strip.

The wheels were of single-piece cast alloy, the front being equipped with sealed ball races, possibly a first for the industry. An alloy GB T91 Sprite caliper brake was employed at the front, while the rear brake was of the internal expanding type, integral with the three speed gear in the Sturmey Archer ‘AB’ hub. It appears as though the drive side flange of the hub was removed for fitting in the wheel.
