= Gertrude Bray =

British architect and politician (1906–1992)

Gertrude Bray (1906–1992) was a British builder, self-taught architect, urban planning advocate, and politician. Known as 'The Home Specialist', she was one of Britain's first prominent women builders, designing and constructing hundreds of homes in Leeds while also serving on the City Council and raising three children.

== Early life and career ==
Bray developed an interest in architecture at Thoresby Girls' School in Leeds. Though tuberculosis prevented formal training, by 17 she was designing house alterations. By the age of 22, she had built her first house for her mother, and at 23, she designed her own home. Bray recalled her entry into the building industry: "I started off by designing a house for my mother. Then I designed one for myself. Then I thought I might as well go on."

== Building and architectural career ==
After designing her own home, Bray began creating houses for relatives and then paying customers. Her business grew quickly. By 1938, she was managing large construction projects, employing 90 workers and two supervisors on one estate in Halton. Her workers referred to her as a "reight good gaffer". By 1939, at the age of 32, she had built a new suburban estate near Cross Gates, designing all 500 houses herself and employing 300 workers.

=== Business growth and family involvement ===
Bray Homes grew to become a significant enterprise in Leeds. Over her career, Bray designed and built over 1,000 houses and bungalows. The company continued operations for several decades, with both Bray's father and her husband Harry joining the business. Her company's longevity is evidenced by its continued activity until at least 1976, when Bray, at age 70, was still actively involved in the business.

Bray's success was evident in her rapid house sales. She once remarked, "I sold 40 houses in one afternoon. I had to stop because I hadn't any more to sell." By the outbreak of World War II, she had built 650 small houses in Leeds. Her experience in construction informed her political views. In a 1945 Labour Women's conference on housing, Bray stood out for her practical approach, criticizing building delays due to shortages of fittings and advocating for mass-produced standardized fittings at fixed prices.

Despite her busy professional life, Bray managed to balance her work with family responsibilities. As of 1939, she had a five-year-old daughter, whom she looked after while also managing her extensive building projects and designing houses. This demonstrated her ability to juggle the demands of motherhood with her successful career in the building industry. Bray's commitment to family remained a constant throughout her career. Just as her first project was designing a house for her mother, one of her last projects in her 70s was designing a home for her daughter Helen. This full-circle moment underscores how Bray's professional and personal lives were intertwined throughout her long career.

=== Marketing strategy ===
Bray's marketing strategy emphasized her unique position as a woman builder, targeting women as her primary audience. She recognized women as key decision-makers in home purchases and design. Bray explained her approach: "I concentrated on selling to the women, instead of the men. The men just wanted to know the price and the number of rooms. But the women were interested in the fittings and the design."

Bray's advertisements emphasized her unique perspective as a woman builder and her focus on practical home design features:

- A June 1937 advertisement stated "Gertrude Bray is a woman builder who designs homes which are different and better."
- Another ad that month highlighted her personal involvement, noting she spent "ten hours every day on the estates in supervision."
- A July 1937 ad further emphasized her unique perspective: "Gertrude Bray is a housewife and a practical builder," and claimed that "No other builder can offer the specialised knowledge possessed by Gertrude Bray."

=== Notable projects ===
Her company, Bray Homes, designed and constructed modern, labor-saving homes in new estates, including:

- Houses on Selby Road, Halton
- Developments around Temple Newsam
- The Vesper Gate Mount estate in Kirkstall
- The Cross Gates Garden Village, which included innovative features like a village green, new roads, shops, terraced houses, and flats

One of Bray's major projects was the development of Penda's Way in Cross Gates. The name was proposed by Bray herself, drawing from local history. It controversially references Penda, a 7th-century pagan king of Mercia who likely marched through the area on his way to battle with Oswy of Northumbria. Bray's interest in local history influenced her naming choices, aiming to avoid repetitive place names common in the district.

Bray was also responsible for the development of Penda's Way railway station on the Cross Gates–Wetherby line. She was credited with requesting the station's construction and giving it its name. At the station's opening in June 1939, Bray was the only woman officially present and was described as "the heroine of the whole show".

=== Design philosophy and innovation ===
Bray maintained an innovative approach to housing design throughout her career. She pioneered the "kitchen niche" or "cooking-recess" concept in her modest houses, creating a more sociable and practical kitchen that allowed women to supervise children and interact with family while cooking. She believed that women occupying smaller houses wanted more room and fewer rooms, incorporating a "cooking recess" that was part of the kitchen but separated only by sliding doors, eliminating the need for a separate scullery.

Her homes were advertised as "Houses of distinctive design and superior finish", and she was known for incorporating modern amenities like stainless steel sinks and refrigerators. In 1954, two decades after starting her building career, she was still advocating for the housewife's perspective in housing design. She noted how tastes had changed over the years, with a shift from front-parlour type houses to designs featuring large living rooms with dining recesses and working kitchens rather than kitchenettes. Bray believed that well-planned kitchens should be suitable for everyday meals, especially breakfast, reflecting her practical approach to home design.

Bray maintained a hands-on approach throughout her career, often being present on-site during construction. She was known to interact directly with workers and tenants, addressing various issues from design choices to practical concerns. This level of involvement was unusual for a developer, particularly for a woman in the male-dominated construction industry of the time. Her presence on building sites sometimes led to confusion, with people initially assuming she was a tenant rather than the developer and boss. Bray's direct involvement extended to all aspects of her work, including occasional attempts at bricklaying, though she admitted to limited success in this area. She continued to manage all aspects of her business, from design and construction to tenant relations, even after her husband joined the Army.

== Political career ==
Bray was first elected as a Labour Party councillor for the Mill Hill & South ward in the 1945 Leeds City Council election. She received 1,387 votes (57.0% of the total), defeating the Conservative candidate. As a councillor, she served on the housing committee, aligning with her professional expertise.

In the 1949 Leeds City Council election, Bray lost her seat but returned to the council in the 1951 Leeds City Council election following a ward reorganization. She was elected in the newly created Holbeck ward.

Bray successfully defended her Holbeck seat in multiple subsequent elections:

- 1953: 64.3% of the vote
- 1956: 61.1% of the vote
- 1959: 59.0% of the vote
- 1962: 68.4% of the vote

In her final recorded election in the 1965 Leeds City Council election, Bray won the Holbeck seat with 55.0% of the vote.

Over her two-decade political career, Bray consistently maintained strong support in her ward, becoming a significant figure in Leeds local politics.

== Views and advocacy ==
Bray was a Labour Party member with strong socialist principles. At a 1945 Labour Women's Conference, she was described as "a member of the Socialist party for 20 years and the builder of 650 small houses in Leeds before the war". This likely refers to her long-standing commitment to socialist ideals within the Labour Party framework.

Bray advocated for various causes, including:

- Equal rights for women in the workplace
- Modern approaches to childbirth, including painless methods. She argued that fear of pain in childbirth was a major factor limiting family size. In 1945, she challenged the prejudice against pain relief in childbirth, asserting: "If men were having the babies they would soon see to it. By doing so they would be serving humanity better than by inventing atomic bombs."
- Housing design as a means of women's emancipation. In a 1949 address to an all-male Rotary Club audience, Bray advocated for smaller houses with modern amenities, stating, "We have to build a smaller house with all the amenities of the better houses before the war to give your wives the chance to be truly emancipated."
- Environmental concerns in urban planning. In the same 1949 address, Bray highlighted air pollution in city centers as a major issue, emphasizing the need for scientific solutions to the "smoke menace".

She spoke openly about experiencing prejudice in her career due to her gender. Bray recalled, "People thought I was mad being a builder. There was terrible prejudice." Despite these challenges, she also noted that being a woman was often an asset in her work. Bray was known for her socialist feminist views and for balancing a successful career with family life.

=== Urban planning and housing ===
Bray advocated for innovative urban planning solutions throughout her career. In a 1943 address to the Leeds Publicity Club titled "Housing for a New Era," she criticized the existing "straggling suburbs, housing estates and ribbon development." Bray emphasized the need to think in terms of rehousing entire communities rather than just a few favored individuals after the war.

In 1944, she supported prefabricated houses as a cost-effective post-war housing solution. She also promoted denser urban development to prevent suburban sprawl, suggesting reorganizing Leeds' housing by utilizing derelict spaces within city boundaries.

Bray's approach to housing issues was strongly influenced by her socialist principles. Her advocacy in the late 1940s urged local authorities to purchase and modernize old houses for conversion into multiple dwellings, favoring public ownership over private enterprise. At a 1945 Labour Women's Conference, she further advocated for significant government intervention in housing, including calls for the mass production of affordable utility kitchen fittings to be achieved by restricting manufacturers' profits. Her stance highlighted a belief in prioritizing accessibility of quality housing features for working people over corporate interests.

Bray proposed a radical vision for urban development, advocating for the construction of skyscraper flats in Leeds. In her 1943 address, she suggested 10-storey flats as a solution, believing that new techniques and materials could create "beautiful, colourful buildings." She argued that people needed to be persuaded to accept new methods and that their limited experience with various forms of housing had restricted their vision of what could be achieved.

In an article for The Labour Woman in April 1945, she elaborated on this vision: "Before us it lies, ten stories high with large windows catching every possible ray of sunshine. It faces east and west, and to every alternate floor on both sides are balconies wide enough to sit out upon." She envisioned these buildings surrounded by "a wide stretch of green interspersed here and there by flowering trees," with dedicated spaces for children and allotments. Bray argued that this vision was "not Utopian" and could be realized.

Her ideas extended to critiquing existing housing developments. In a 1953 conference, she argued that 50% of gardens on Leeds Corporation housing estates were "wasted land" and considered giving everyone in the suburbs a garden "just ridiculous," emphasizing her preference for more efficient use of urban space.
