= Osmondthorpe =

District of east Leeds, West Yorkshire, England

Coordinates: 53.79587°N 1.50051°W

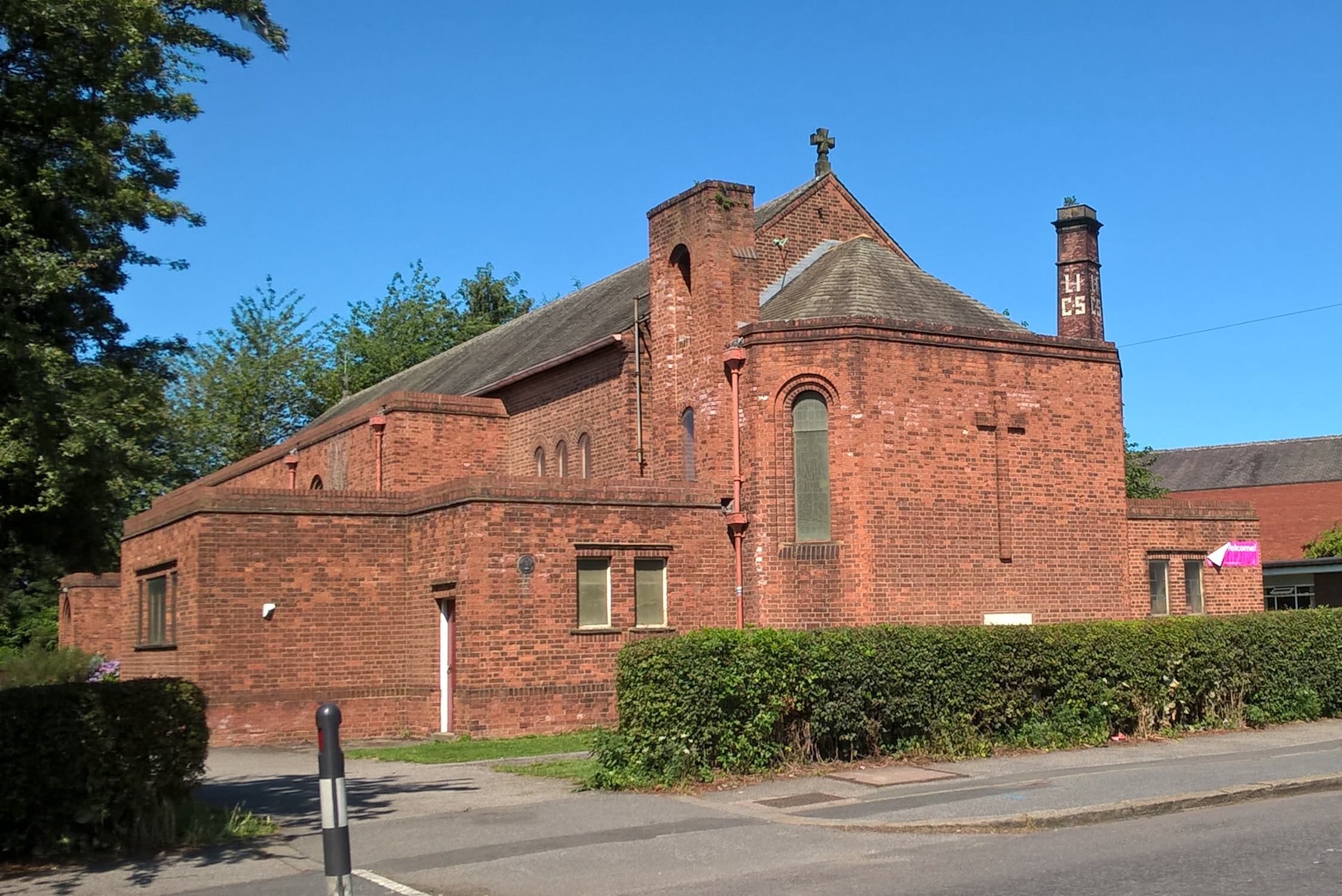
- St Philip's Church, Osmondthorpe Lane

- Location within West Yorkshire
- Metropolitan borough: Leeds
- Metropolitan county: West Yorkshire
- Region: Yorkshire and the Humber
- Country: England
- Sovereign state: United Kingdom
- Police: West Yorkshire
- Fire: West Yorkshire
- Ambulance: Yorkshire

Osmondthorpe a district of east Leeds in West Yorkshire, England is considered part of the Halton Moor district.

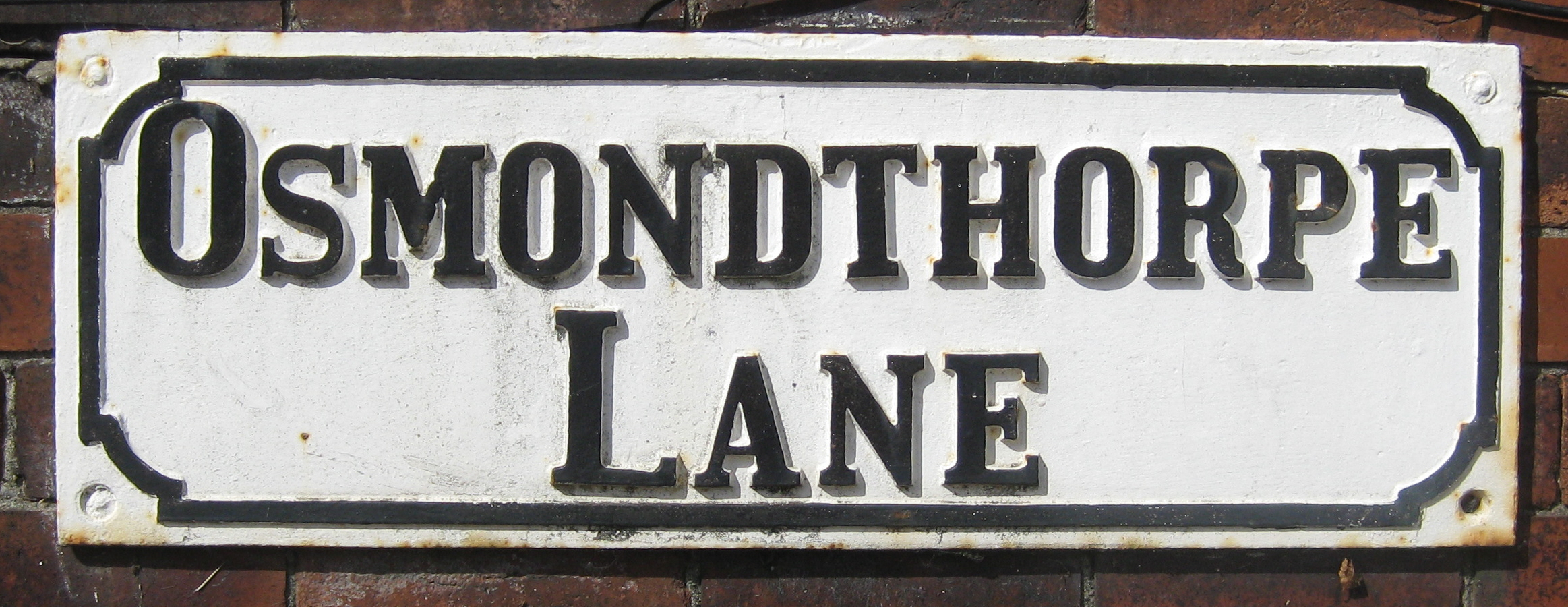
Street sign

It is situated in the LS9 Leeds postcode area, two miles (3 km) to the east of Leeds city centre between East End Park and Halton Moor. The district is part of the Burmantofts and Richmond Hill Ward of the Leeds Metropolitan Council.

It was originally a hamlet 3.5 miles SE of Leeds associated with the township of Temple Newsam and in the Whitkirk parish with some coal working. Ralph Thoresby visited Osmondthorpe Hall, which stood on the West side of Osmondthorpe Lane, but was destroyed by fire in 1924. Some 50 acres of the grounds were used to create East End Park and the rest for housing.

On 31 December 1894 Osmondthorpe became a separate civil parish, being formed from the part of the parish of Templenewsam in Leeds County Borough, on 1 April 1925 the parish was abolished and merged with Leeds. In 1921 the parish had a population of 773.

Osmondthorpe railway station was opened by the London & North Eastern Railway on the Selby Line in 1930 to serve a new estate of housing, but closed in 1960. Osmondthorpe is home to the Neville Hill railway depot.
