= Stanningley =

District of Pudsey in West Yorkshire, England

Coordinates: 53.807°N 1.667°W

- Location within West Yorkshire
- OS grid reference: SE225346
  - London: 170 mi (270 km) SSE
- Metropolitan borough: City of Leeds
- Metropolitan county: West Yorkshire
- Region: Yorkshire and the Humber
- Country: England
- Sovereign state: United Kingdom
- Post town: PUDSEY
- Postcode district: LS28
- Dialling code: 0113
- Police: West Yorkshire
- Fire: West Yorkshire
- Ambulance: Yorkshire
- UK Parliament: Leeds West and Pudsey

Stanningley is a district of Pudsey, West Yorkshire, England. It is situated approximately 5 miles (8 km) west of Leeds city centre on the A647 road, the original main road from Leeds to Bradford. The appropriate Leeds Metropolitan Ward is Bramley and Stanningley. The parish is part of the Anglican Diocese of Leeds.

== History ==
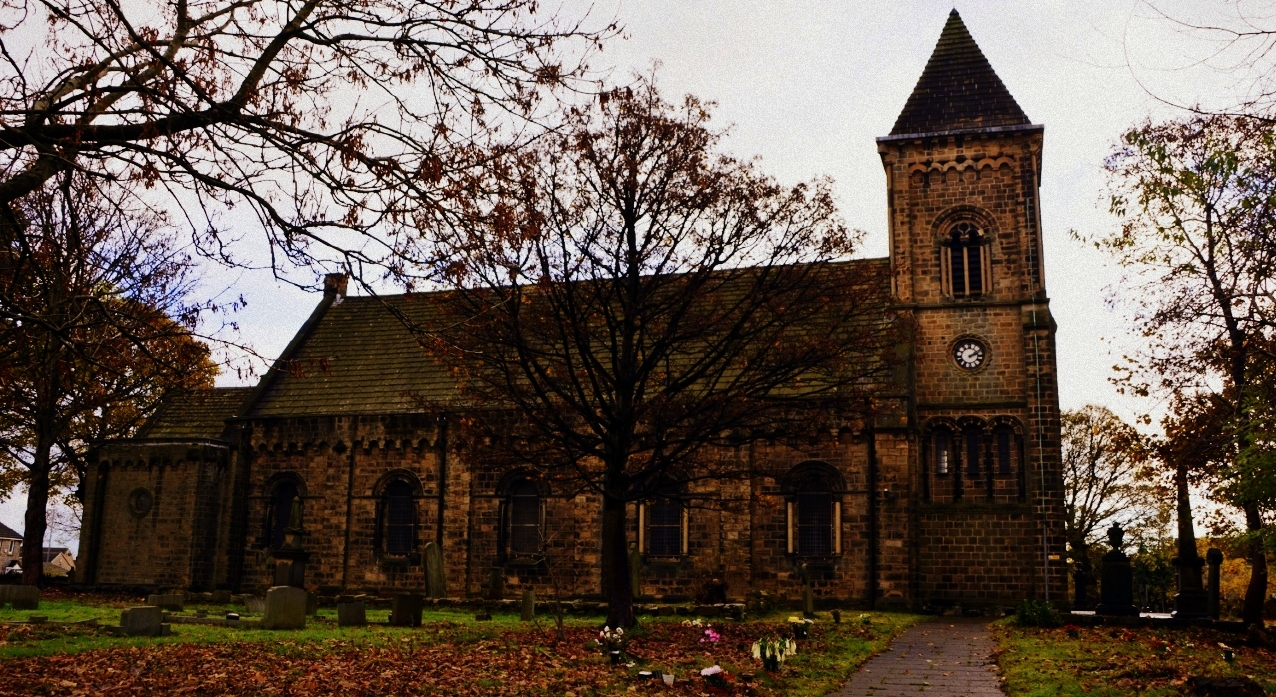
St Thomas Parish Church (pictured in 2016)

The parish church of St Thomas was built in 1841 in Neo-Norman style and is now Grade II listed. It was designed by H. Rogerson. The foundation stone was laid on 5 November 1839, by John Farrar of Pudsey. The organ chamber and vestry were added in 1870. There are examples of stained glass dating to the 1860s and painted panels from the late 1880s. There is a notable marble memorial to John Butler of West Royd, d.1884 which was erected by the men of the Stanningley Ironworks where he was the manager. One of the stained glass windows (by Mr Preedy of London) is dedicated to Thomas Hardaker and Emma Carrick, two Sunday school teachers who were struck down by lightening in 1869, two months before they were due to be married. Many thousands of people attended the funeral of the unfortunate couple who had been caught in a storm while walking between Farsley and Stanningley. Having taken sheleter under a wall, between two iron railings, the lightening is believed to have formed a short circuit between the metal structures killing the two lovers, coins in the pocket of Hardaker having melted and fused.

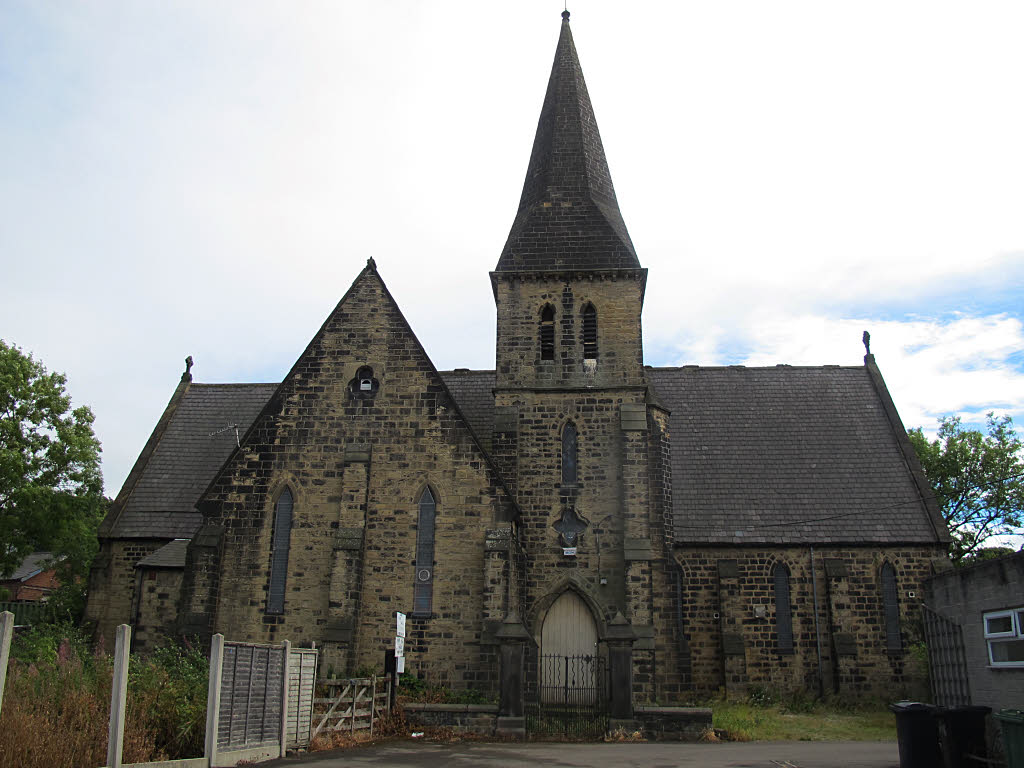
The former St Paul's Parish Church (pictured in 2016)

St Paul's Parish Church was constructed in 1853 and its register started in 1856. The last burial at the church took place in 1939 before it was closed in 1982 as the parish was merged with Pudsey's St Lawrence Parish. After the closure, the building was converted into an office space and used by companies like Rockstar Leeds, a video game developer. As of December 2018, the building is privately owned.

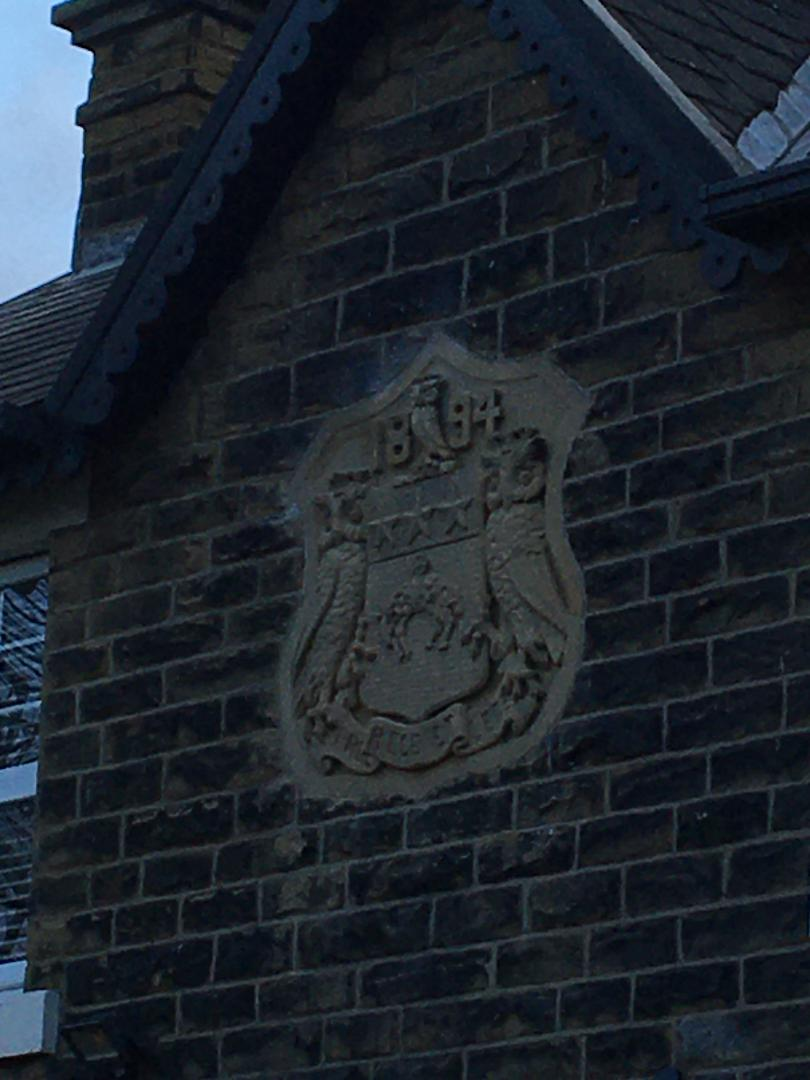
Stanningley Park Lodge Stone Heraldic Crest of Leeds with date of 1894

In 1894, the park lodge at Stanningley Park was built. It has the coat of arms of Leeds mounted on the park side of the house. The park once had a greenhouse.

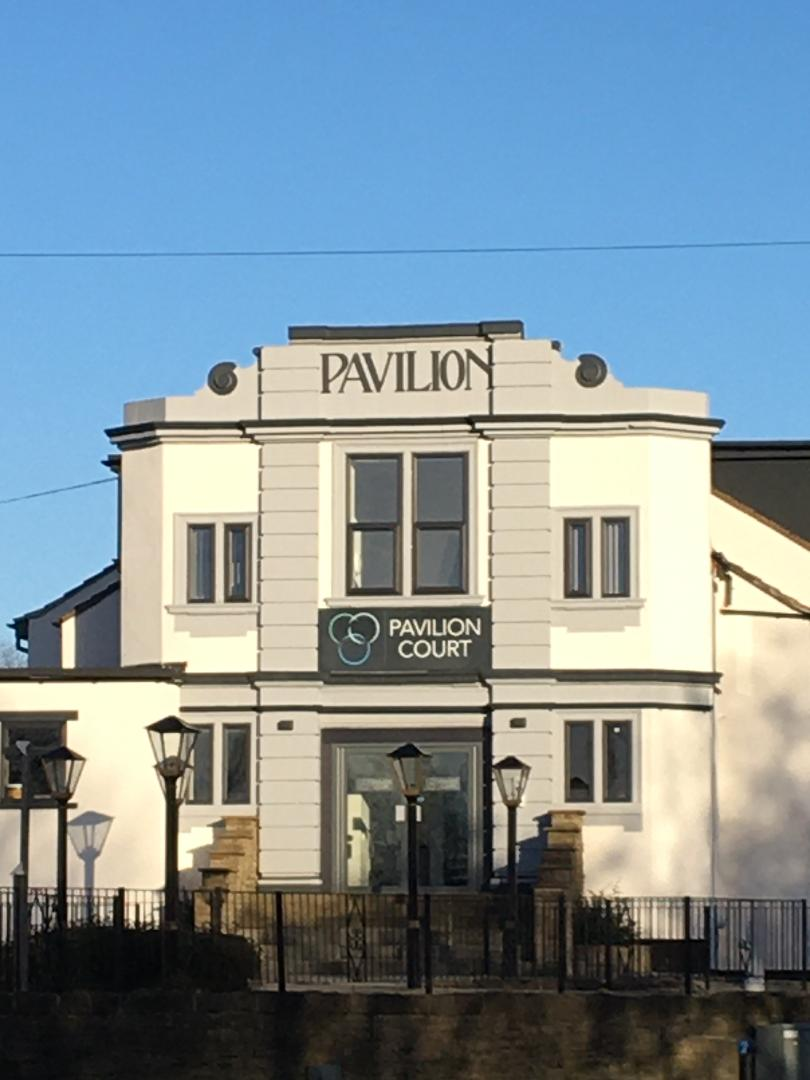
Pavilion Picture House, built 1920, Stanningley January 2021

The distinctive 1920s Pavilion Picture House was opened in February 1920. It was designed by J. P. Crawford of Albion Place. The first film shown was Daddy-Long-Legs starring Mary Pickford. In 1970, the cinema closed and it was turned into a bingo hall, before becoming a business centre c. 2005 and private accommodation c. 2020.

=== F & T Kitchin and Co. ===
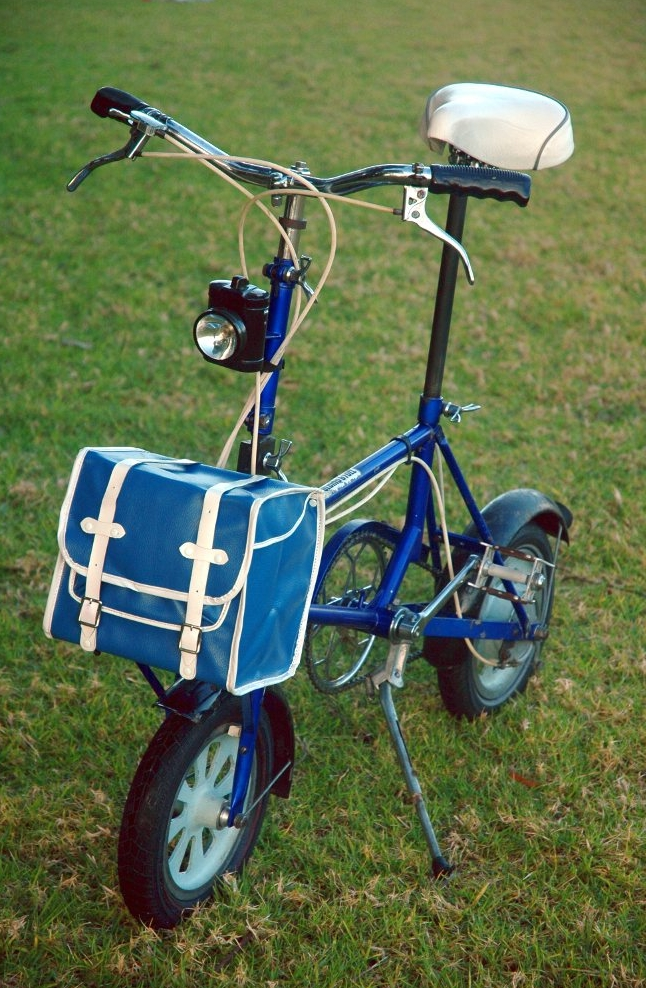
Bootie Folding Cycle, made in the Vickersdale works, Stanningley, Leeds from 1965 to 1973

Stanningley was the home of the Bootie Folding Cycle. It was made by a local engineering firm, F & T Kitchin & Co, at their Vickersdale works as a sideline to their main business. Production of the Bootie bicycle began in 1965 and continued with only minor refinements until early 1973.

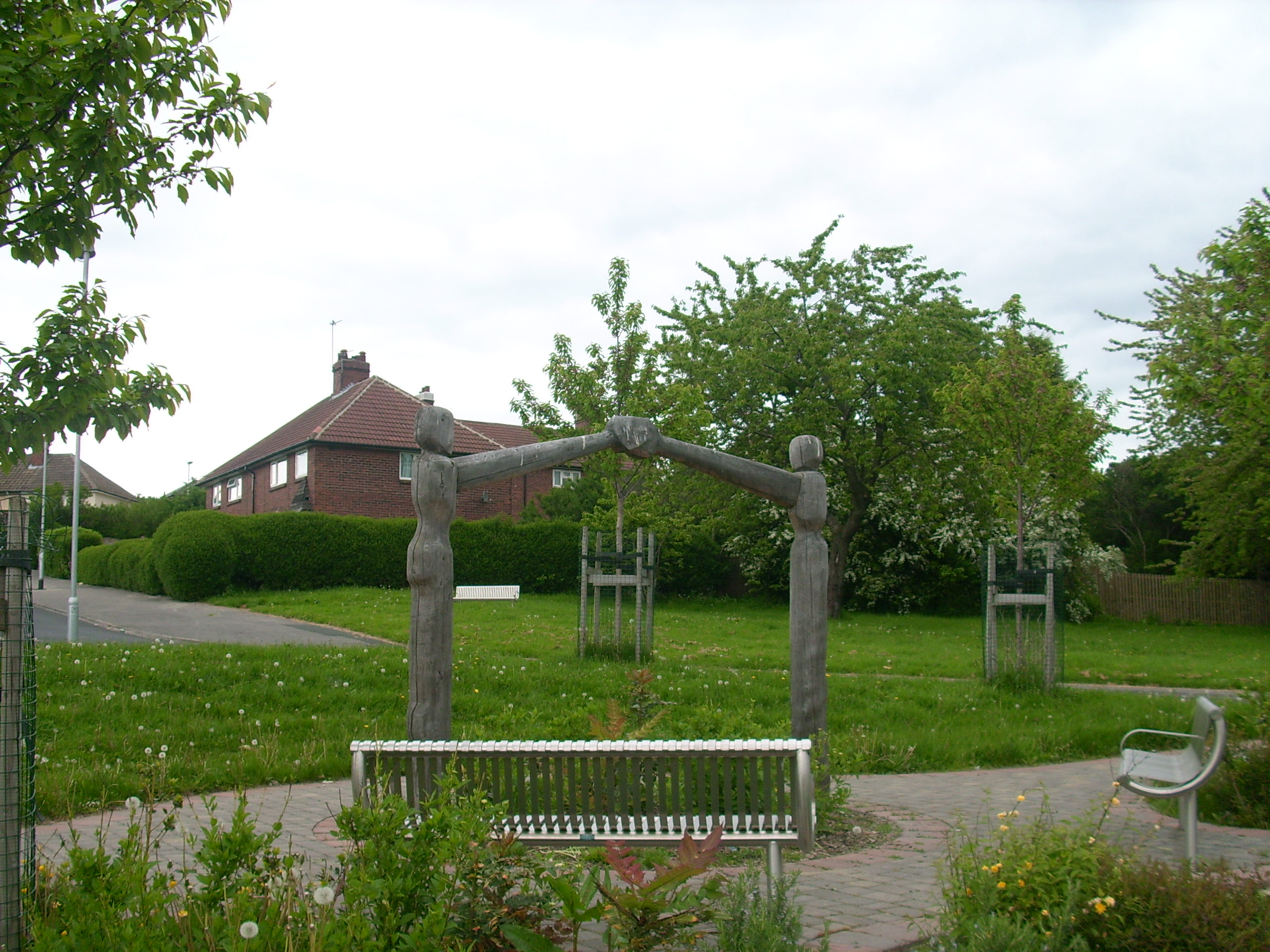
Public art near Stanningley Road

=== UK's first High Occupancy Vehicle Lane ===
A section of the A647 road Stanningley Road and Stanningley By-Pass became the UK's first High Occupancy Vehicle Lane in 1998. It began on a trial basis and was made permanent after proving successful.

This part of the route between Leeds and Bradford experienced high levels of traffic congestion and there were few public transport priority measures. The council originally wanted to install a bus lane, but found that bus service frequencies were too low to justify it.

The project was part of an EU research project called Increasing CAR Occupancy (ICARO). Its objectives were to increase car occupancy by encouraging car sharing and to demonstrate the feasibility of providing a lane for shared use by buses, other high occupancy vehicles, motorcycles and cycles.

== Economy ==
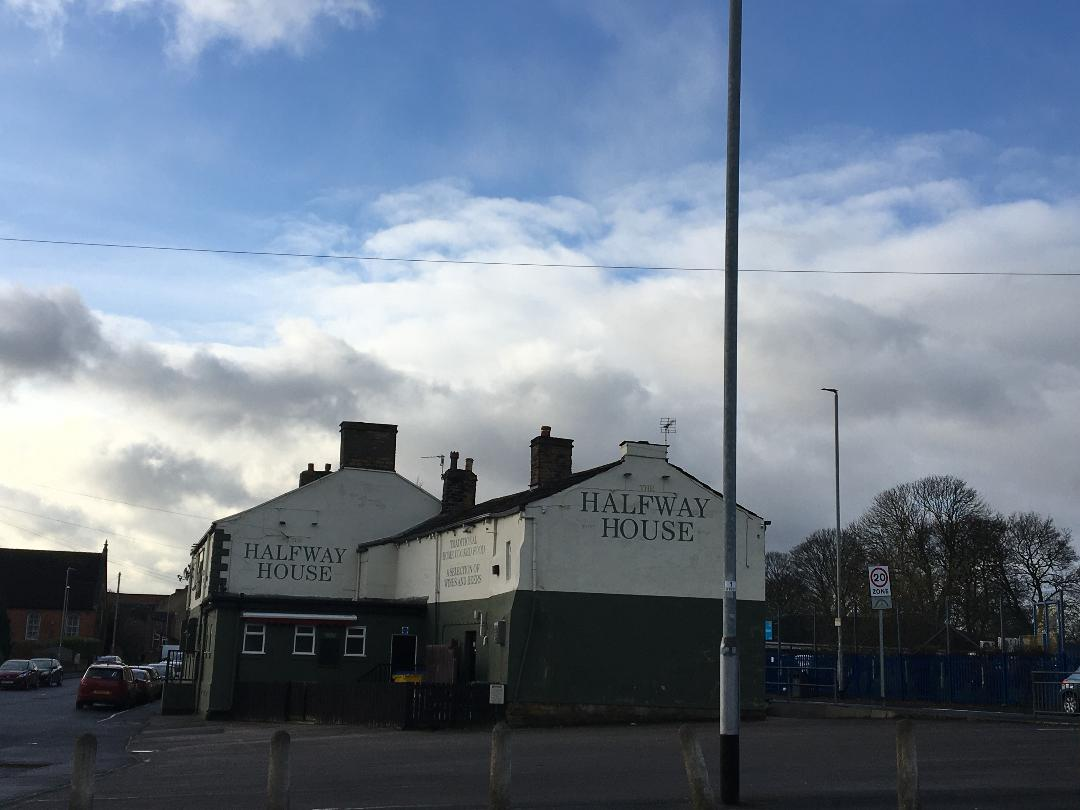
Halfway House, Stanningley, Leeds

Town Street and a section of Stanningley Road to the east are home to most of the district's shops, pubs and eateries. Amenities include a dry cleaners, butcher, newsagent, salon and car garage. There are 10 public houses in Stanningley, including The Jug & Barrel, Waggon & Horses and The Great Northern. The historic pub The Halfway House is on the corner of Broad Lane and Leeds and Bradford Road. A photo in the Leodis archive shows the pub in the 1950s.

Owlcotes Shopping Centre, in Stanningley, contains an Asda supermarket and a Marks & Spencer store, and B&M shop.

== Sport ==
=== Stanningley SARLFC ===
Stanningley is home to Stanningley Sport and Amateur Rugby League Club. Formed in 1889 it is one of the oldest amateur rugby league clubs in the world and has provided numerous players to the professional ranks. These including England captain Jamie Peacock, Jamie Jones-Buchanan, Tom Johnstone, Ryan Atkins, Ash Gibson, Jordan Lilley, Ashton Golding, Garreth Carvell, Michael Banks, Andy Bastow, Steve Nicholson, Mark Wilson and Roy Dickinson. Danika Priim represented England whilst at Stanningley.

=== Football ===
There are two Stanningley football clubs, despite neither actually playing in Stanningley. Stanningley Albion run junior and open age teams play on Woodhall in Pudsey and Stanningley Old Boys run open age teams play in Swinnow.

== See also ==
- Listed buildings in Calverley and Farsley
- Listed buildings in Leeds (Bramley and Stanningley Ward)
