= Far Headingley =

Area of Leeds, England

Coordinates: 53.826486°N 1.581603°W

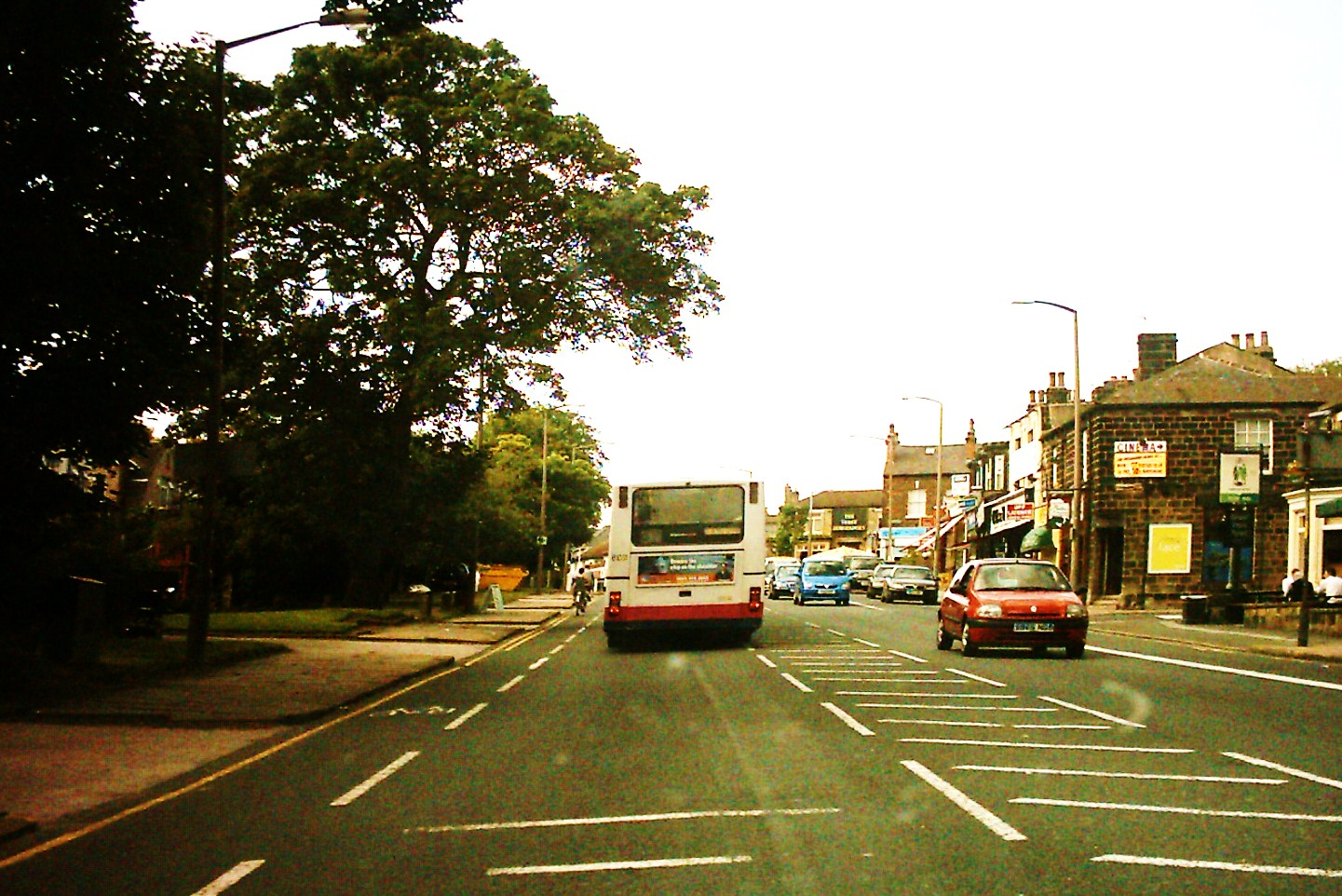
- Otley Road in Far Headingley, showing the New Inn and the Three Horseshoes.

- Location within West Yorkshire
- OS grid reference: SE276367
- Metropolitan borough: City of Leeds
- Metropolitan county: West Yorkshire
- Region: Yorkshire and the Humber
- Country: England
- Sovereign state: United Kingdom
- Post town: LEEDS
- Postcode district: LS6, LS16
- Dialling code: 0113
- Police: West Yorkshire
- Fire: West Yorkshire
- Ambulance: Yorkshire
- UK Parliament: Leeds North West

Far Headingley is an area of Leeds, West Yorkshire, England approximately 3 miles (4.8 km) north of the city centre. The parish of Far Headingley was created in 1868.

The area is part of the Weetwood ward of Leeds City Council and Leeds North West parliamentary constituency.

It is situated beyond (i.e. to the north of) central Headingley, on the way to West Park and Weetwood along the A660 Otley Road. Like the rest of Headingley, there are many student houses and houses to let.

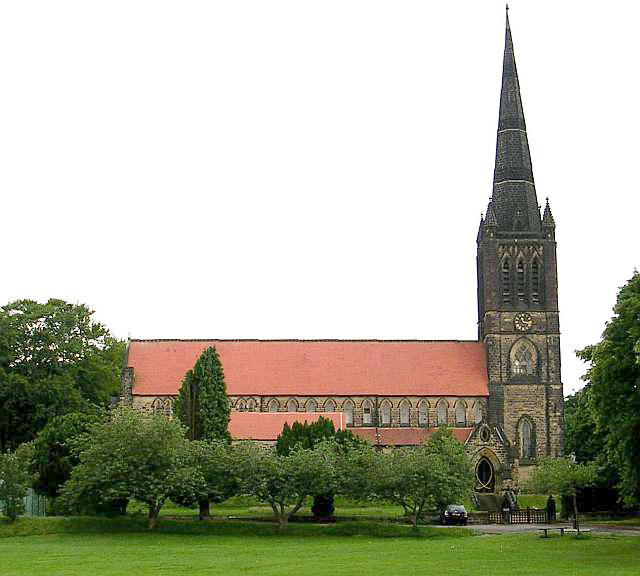
St Chad's Church

Features of Far Headingley include St. Chad's parish church, the Cottage Road Cinema, and Woodies and the Three Horseshoes public houses at the start of the Otley Run pub crawl.

== Notable residents ==
Arthur Ransome, author of the Swallows and Amazons series of children's books, was born in Headingley but moved to Far Headingley as a child in 1890. His father, Cyril Ransome, was a professor at the University of Leeds and had lived in Far Headingley before his marriage in 1882. It was at his house in Hollin Lane that the young Prince Alemayehu of Ethiopia died in 1869.

Alan Bennett, actor, author, playwright and screenwriter, lived in Far Headingley as a child from 1946-1957, above his father's butcher's shop at 92A Otley Road.

== See also ==
- Listed buildings in Leeds (Weetwood Ward)
