= 1980 Leeds City Council election =

1980 UK local government election

- 1 May 1980

All 99 seats on Leeds City Council 50 seats needed for a majority
	First party	Second party
Leader	George Mudie	Peter Sparling
Party	Labour	Conservative
Leader's seat	Seacroft	Moortown
Seats won	62	29
Seat change	▲18	▼16
Popular vote	94,460	74,442
Percentage	43.7%	34.4%
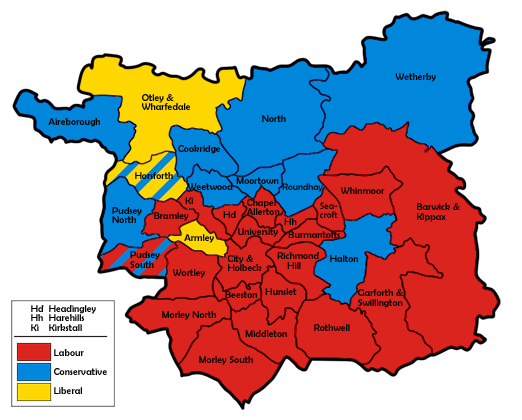
Council control before election
Minority administration
Conservative
Council control after election
Majority administration
Labour

The 1980 Leeds City Council election took place on 1 May 1980 to elect members of Leeds City Council in England.

A full boundary review of Leeds's electoral wards increased the number of wards from 32 to 33, also increasing the number of councillors from 96 to 99. This prompted the entire council needing to be elected.

== Boundary changes ==
The boundary changes added an extra ward to the existing 32 - increasing the councillor total by three to 99 - with just half the ward names surviving the changes:

Abolished:

1. Armley and Castleton
2. Beeston and Holbeck
3. Burley
4. Burmantofts and Richmond Hill
5. Chapel Allerton and Scott Hall
6. City and Woodhouse
7. Cookridge and Weetwood
8. Garforth North and Barwick
9. Kippax and Swillington
10. Gipton and Whinmoor
11. Harehills and Roundhay
12. Hunslet East and West
13. Osmondthorpe
14. Otley
15. Stanningley
16. Talbot

Created:

1. Armley
2. Barwick & Kippax
3. Beeston
4. Burmantofts
5. Chapel Allerton
6. City & Holbeck
7. Cookridge
8. Garforth & Swillington
9. Harehills
10. Hunslet
11. North
12. Otley & Wharfedale
13. Richmond Hill
14. Roundhay
15. University
16. Weetwood
17. Whinmoor

== Election result ==
The drop in Conservative support - which seen them set lows in vote share and seats won - allowed Labour to win record representation and comfortably regain control of the council from the Conservatives, with a 25-seat strong majority. Labour also managed highs in votes and vote share, once the previous year's totals are omitted for unrepresentatively high turnout (which were gained from coinciding with the general election that year).

The Liberals, who fielded their first full-slate of candidates, also achieved party records but were rewarded with fewer seats in the new landscape; their gains confined to Armley, Horsforth and Otley, looking unlikely to win the new seats replacing the formerly favourable seats for Hunslet and Pudsey.

Elsewhere, the Ecologists bettered their previous efforts with an increased outing, standing candidates in over a half of the wards, surpassing Liberal support in a number of them. Beyond the regular Communist slate, there was also another appearance from an Independent in Morley North, an Independent Liberal standing in Rothwell and the first appearance of a Residents Association by way of a candidate each in Headingley, Kirkstall and Weetwood.

Leeds local election result 1980
Party	Seats	Gains	Losses	Net gain/loss	Seats %	Votes %	Votes	+/−
Labour	62	0	0	0	62.6	43.7	94,460	+2.5%
Conservative	29	0	0	0	29.3	34.4	74,442	-4.1%
Liberal	8	0	0	0	8.1	18.0	38,818	+0.2%
Ecology	0	0	0	0	0.0	2.7	5,790	+1.2%
Communist	0	0	0	0	0.0	0.6	1,369	+0.3%
Residents	0	0	0	0	0.0	0.3	604	+0.3%
Independent	0	0	0	0	0.0	0.2	395	-0.0%
Independent Liberal	0	0	0	0	0.0	0.1	268	+0.1%

This result has the following consequences for the total number of seats on the council after the elections:

Party	Previous council	New council
Labour	44	62
Conservatives	45	29
Liberals	7	8
Total	96	99
Working majority	0	25

== Ward results ==
Aireborough
Party	Candidate	Votes	%	±%
Conservative	W. Hudson	3,236	40.6	N/A
Conservative	H. Barber	3,039		
Conservative	T. Hawkins	2,947		
Liberal	J. Brown	2,400	30.1	N/A
Liberal	R. Lee	2,239		
Liberal	G. McCabe	2,226		
Labour	M. Dunn	2,098	26.3	N/A
Labour	J. Collins	2,068		
Labour	J. Prior	2,009		
Ecology	R. Cresswell	242	3.0	N/A
Majority		547	10.5	N/A
Turnout		7,976		N/A
Conservative win (new seat)				
Conservative win (new seat)				
Conservative win (new seat)				

Armley
Party	Candidate	Votes	%	±%
Liberal	Michael Meadowcroft	3,746	51.5	N/A
Liberal	D. Selby	3,449		
Liberal	B. Nelson	3,439		
Labour	A. Gunter	2,281	31.4	N/A
Labour	P. Shires	2,198		
Labour	V. Firth	2,080		
Conservative	H. Hinchliffe	1,159	15.9	N/A
Conservative	B. Stockwell	1,096		
Conservative	E. McKimmings	1,066		
Communist	J. Light	81	1.1	N/A
Majority		1,158	20.2	N/A
Turnout		7,267		N/A
Liberal win (new seat)				
Liberal win (new seat)				
Liberal win (new seat)				

Barwick & Kippax
Party	Candidate	Votes	%	±%
Labour	F. Flatters	3,784	51.0	N/A
Labour	M. Monks	3,713		
Labour	K. Smith	3,608		
Conservative	A. Taylor	2,729	36.8	N/A
Conservative	B. Rowley	2,688		
Conservative	J. Sherwin	2,620		
Liberal	R. Hutchinson	458	6.2	N/A
Ecology	D. Corry	445	6.0	N/A
Liberal	N. Parnaby	428		
Liberal	B. Maney	394		
Majority		879	14.2	N/A
Turnout		7,416		N/A
Labour win (new seat)				
Labour win (new seat)				
Labour win (new seat)				

Beeston
Party	Candidate	Votes	%	±%
Labour	A. Beevers	3,131	50.3	N/A
Labour	H. Booth	3,101		
Labour	Michael McGowan	2,680		
Conservative	W. Birch	1,721	27.7	N/A
Conservative	S. Grenfell	1,450		
Conservative	J. Sturgeon	1,411		
Liberal	M. Day	1,218	19.6	N/A
Liberal	J. Ellis	1,184		
Liberal	R. Heselwood	1,113		
Ecology	R. Mitchell	151	2.4	N/A
Majority		959	22.7	N/A
Turnout		6,221		N/A
Labour win (new seat)				
Labour win (new seat)				
Labour win (new seat)				

Bramley
Party	Candidate	Votes	%	±%
Labour	E. Atkinson	3,877	64.7	N/A
Labour	A. Miller	3,690		
Labour	A. Atkinson	3,644		
Conservative	I. Benton	1,308	21.8	N/A
Conservative	L. Hargreaves	1,218		
Conservative	K. Knapton	1,205		
Liberal	L. Meadowcroft	804	13.4	N/A
Liberal	S. Gillen	692		
Liberal	B. Jacques	646		
Majority		2,336	42.9	N/A
Turnout		5,989		N/A
Labour win (new seat)				
Labour win (new seat)				
Labour win (new seat)				

Burmantofts
Party	Candidate	Votes	%	±%
Labour	R. Millet	3,393	47.4	N/A
Labour	M. Moynihan	3,343		
Labour	R. Sedler	3,144		
Liberal	M. Clay	2,779	38.8	N/A
Liberal	N. Mackie	2,285		
Liberal	T. Bland	2,223		
Conservative	V. Dodgson	761	10.6	N/A
Conservative	M. Suttenstall	687		
Conservative	M. Gorrill	670		
Communist	M. Monkman	225	3.1	N/A
Majority		365	8.6	N/A
Turnout		7,158		N/A
Labour win (new seat)				
Labour win (new seat)				
Labour win (new seat)				

Chapel Allerton
Party	Candidate	Votes	%	±%
Labour	J. Frankland	3,326	51.3	N/A
Labour	C. Clarke	3,253		
Labour	N. Taggart	3,180		
Conservative	K. Hind	2,200	34.0	N/A
Conservative	J. Howard	2,184		
Conservative	M. Sexton	2,150		
Liberal	J. Clay	563	8.7	N/A
Liberal	B. Jones	438		
Liberal	D. Johns	417		
Ecology	P. Sanders	259	4.0	N/A
Ecology	H. Terry	210		
Communist	L. Willoughby	131	2.0	N/A
Majority		980	17.4	N/A
Turnout		6,479		N/A
Labour win (new seat)				
Labour win (new seat)				
Labour win (new seat)				

City & Holbeck
Party	Candidate	Votes	%	±%
Labour	B. Sanderson	3,854	67.8	N/A
Labour	E. Morris	3,663		
Labour	C. Myers	3,548		
Liberal	P. Jones	1,133	19.9	N/A
Liberal	J. Wright	1,048		
Liberal	P. Tekchandani	953		
Conservative	D. Tomlinson	701	12.3	N/A
Conservative	S. Kaberry	668		
Conservative	H. Stockwell	633		
Majority		2,415	47.8	N/A
Turnout		5,688		N/A
Labour win (new seat)				
Labour win (new seat)				
Labour win (new seat)				

Cookridge
Party	Candidate	Votes	%	±%
Conservative	K. Loudon	3,353	58.7	N/A
Conservative	M. Gledhill	3,200		
Conservative	J. Carter	3,198		
Labour	B. McKiernan	1,247	21.8	N/A
Labour	J. Woolmer	1,223		
Labour	E. Whelan	1,167		
Liberal	D. Lofthouse	844	14.8	N/A
Liberal	B. Dodds	785		
Liberal	D. Taylor	758		
Ecology	D. Darnborough	264	4.6	N/A
Majority		1,951	36.9	N/A
Turnout		5,708		N/A
Conservative win (new seat)				
Conservative win (new seat)				
Conservative win (new seat)				

Garforth & Swillington
Party	Candidate	Votes	%	±%
Labour	G. Moakes	4,208	51.3	N/A
Labour	D. Lambert	3,941		
Labour	R. Smith	3,912		
Conservative	N. May	3,145	38.3	N/A
Conservative	W. Hedley	3,125		
Conservative	D. Schofield	3,056		
Liberal	R. Corrigan	589	7.2	N/A
Liberal	M. Winterton	391		
Liberal	J. Lelean	372		
Ecology	D. Linley-Young	266	3.2	N/A
Ecology	J. Dowsett	238		
Majority		767	13.0	N/A
Turnout		8,208		N/A
Labour win (new seat)				
Labour win (new seat)				
Labour win (new seat)				

Halton
Party	Candidate	Votes	%	±%
Conservative	M. Dodgson	3,566	59.2	N/A
Conservative	W. Hyde	3,486		
Conservative	D. Wood	3,401		
Labour	H. Harris	2,040	33.9	N/A
Labour	A. McQueenie	1,904		
Labour	L. Worth	1,853		
Liberal	P. Julings	415	6.9	N/A
Liberal	A. Scoot	415		
Liberal	A. Weatherly	376		
Majority		1,361	25.3	N/A
Turnout		6,021		N/A
Conservative win (new seat)				
Conservative win (new seat)				
Conservative win (new seat)				

Harehills
Party	Candidate	Votes	%	±%
Labour	L. Cohen	3,611	63.5	N/A
Labour	T. Briggs	3,360		
Labour	M. Simmons	2,447		
Conservative	D. MacLeod	1,584	27.9	N/A
Conservative	R. Simpson	1,577		
Conservative	L. Welch	1,565		
Liberal	P. Langley	492	8.7	N/A
Liberal	J. Gandhi	470		
Liberal	P. McCarthy	421		
Majority		863	35.6	N/A
Turnout		5,687		N/A
Labour win (new seat)				
Labour win (new seat)				
Labour win (new seat)				

Headingley
Party	Candidate	Votes	%	±%
Labour	M. Dalwood	2,836	41.8	N/A
Labour	J. Thomas	2,833		
Labour	E. Millet	2,512		
Conservative	E. Clark	2,071	30.5	N/A
Conservative	J. Searle	2,022		
Conservative	P. Gruen	2,001		
Liberal	D. Rolfe	704	10.4	N/A
Liberal	M. Gradwell	679		
Liberal	M. Hipshon	628		
Ecology	R. Boyle	451	6.6	N/A
Residents	K. Nathan	383	5.6	N/A
Communist	B. Cooper	346	5.1	N/A
Majority		441	11.3	N/A
Turnout		6,791		N/A
Labour win (new seat)				
Labour win (new seat)				
Labour win (new seat)				

Horsforth
Party	Candidate	Votes	%	±%
Liberal	S. Cooksey	3,576	43.7	N/A
Liberal	M. Crossfield	3,488		
Conservative	V. Stevens	3,279	40.0	N/A
Conservative	K. Vause	3,234		
Conservative	J. Unsworth	3,175		
Liberal	M. Moreland	3,158		
Labour	A. Radford	908	11.1	N/A
Labour	R. Winn	894		
Labour	G. Wood	789		
Ecology	P. Lewenz	429	5.2	N/A
Majority		254	3.6	N/A
Turnout		8,192		N/A
Liberal win (new seat)				
Liberal win (new seat)				
Conservative win (new seat)				

Hunslet
Party	Candidate	Votes	%	±%
Labour	Geoff Driver	3,621	84.4	N/A
Labour	John Battle	3,472		
Labour	Trevor Park	3,417		
Liberal	L. Hirst	380	8.9	N/A
Liberal	E. Lynch	350		
Liberal	D. Marsh	289		
Conservative	D. Nichols	287	6.7	N/A
Conservative	R. Tetley	269		
Conservative	J. Stevens	266		
Majority		3,037	75.6	N/A
Turnout		4,288		N/A
Labour win (new seat)				
Labour win (new seat)				
Labour win (new seat)				

Kirkstall
Party	Candidate	Votes	%	±%
Labour	E. Nash	4,165	62.9	N/A
Labour	J. Illingworth	4,033		
Labour	Bernard Atha	3,842		
Conservative	P. Sexton	1,759	26.5	N/A
Conservative	G. Bullock	1,745		
Conservative	M. Jones	1,666		
Liberal	L. Keates	423	6.4	N/A
Liberal	M. Leser	388		
Communist	B. Jackson	147	2.2	N/A
Residents	J. Coates	132	2.0	N/A
Majority		2,083	36.3	N/A
Turnout		6,626		N/A
Labour win (new seat)				
Labour win (new seat)				
Labour win (new seat)				

Middleton
Party	Candidate	Votes	%	±%
Labour	J. Kitchen	3,265	73.5	N/A
Labour	J. Taylor	3,253		
Labour	J. Mann	2,995		
Conservative	A. Larvin	588	13.2	N/A
Conservative	K. Crosby	574		
Conservative	E. Scott	544		
Liberal	D. Hart	452	10.2	N/A
Liberal	R. James	340		
Liberal	M. Batley	312		
Ecology	B. Monaghan	137	3.1	N/A
Majority		2,407	60.3	N/A
Turnout		4,442		N/A
Labour win (new seat)				
Labour win (new seat)				
Labour win (new seat)				

Moortown
Party	Candidate	Votes	%	±%
Conservative	C. Thomas	3,092	52.9	N/A
Conservative	P. Sparling	3,072		
Conservative	S. Symmonds	2,967		
Labour	T. Cooke	1,608	27.5	N/A
Labour	R. Wilson	1,555		
Labour	P. Jeffers	1,485		
Liberal	R. Clay	794	13.6	N/A
Liberal	T. Garbett	686		
Liberal	I. Johnson	589		
Ecology	R. Evans	348	6.0	N/A
Majority		1,359	25.4	N/A
Turnout		5,842		N/A
Conservative win (new seat)				
Conservative win (new seat)				
Conservative win (new seat)				

Morley North
Party	Candidate	Votes	%	±%
Labour	P. Jones	3,731	48.5	N/A
Labour	R. Cordingley	3,715		
Labour	B. Cook	3,565		
Conservative	R. Senior	2,891	37.6	N/A
Conservative	R. Verity	2,757		
Conservative	B. Barker	2,709		
Liberal	A. Gilchrist	682	8.9	N/A
Independent	B. Morris	395	5.1	N/A
Majority		674	10.9	N/A
Turnout		7,699		N/A
Labour win (new seat)				
Labour win (new seat)				
Labour win (new seat)				

Morley South
Party	Candidate	Votes	%	±%
Labour	B. North	4,687	66.1	N/A
Labour	B. Haydn	4,658		
Labour	K. Burnley	4,294		
Conservative	S. Hodgson	1,978	27.9	N/A
Conservative	A. Grayson	1,966		
Conservative	M. Broadhead	1,883		
Ecology	M. Coates	430	6.1	N/A
Majority		2,316	38.2	N/A
Turnout		7,095		N/A
Labour win (new seat)				
Labour win (new seat)				
Labour win (new seat)				

North
Party	Candidate	Votes	%	±%
Conservative	A. Redmond	3,123	57.5	N/A
Conservative	R. Feldman	3,094		
Conservative	K. Sibbald	3,069		
Labour	E. Hayhurst	1,422	26.2	N/A
Labour	J. Monksfield	1,277		
Labour	J. Roche	1,264		
Liberal	M. Phillips	500	9.2	N/A
Liberal	E. Hart	489		
Ecology	C. Rushworth	382	7.0	N/A
Liberal	C. Shenton	348		
Majority		1,647	31.3	N/A
Turnout		5,427		N/A
Conservative win (new seat)				
Conservative win (new seat)				
Conservative win (new seat)				

Otley & Wharfedale
Party	Candidate	Votes	%	±%
Liberal	H. Morgan	4,987	47.4	N/A
Liberal	G. Kirkland	4,563		
Liberal	J. Spencer	4,288		
Conservative	S. Day	3,969	37.8	N/A
Conservative	G. Francis	3,734		
Conservative	M. Drayton	3,460		
Labour	J. Rookledge	1,038	9.9	N/A
Labour	M. Marshall	984		
Labour	J. Kerwin-Davey	869		
Ecology	A. Laurence	518	4.9	N/A
Ecology	A. Marriott	447		
Majority		319	9.7	N/A
Turnout		10,512		N/A
Liberal win (new seat)				
Liberal win (new seat)				
Liberal win (new seat)				

Pudsey North
Party	Candidate	Votes	%	±%
Conservative	A. Carter	3,901	45.1	N/A
Conservative	I. Favell	3,664		
Conservative	J. Bashall	3,604		
Labour	P. Burrill	3,245	37.5	N/A
Labour	A. Sugden	3,076		
Labour	C. Say	3,036		
Liberal	A. Booker	1,497	17.3	N/A
Liberal	R. Hollingworth	1,492		
Liberal	L. Stevenson	1,411		
Majority		359	7.6	N/A
Turnout		8,643		N/A
Conservative win (new seat)				
Conservative win (new seat)				
Conservative win (new seat)				

Pudsey South
Party	Candidate	Votes	%	±%
Conservative	P. Kersting	2,905	39.7	N/A
Labour	E. Hickinson	2,773	37.9	N/A
Labour	D. Brown	2,717		
Labour	N. Rhodes	2,671		
Conservative	L. Fletcher	2,530		
Conservative	P. Lee	2,412		
Liberal	P. Coulson	1,634	22.3	N/A
Liberal	A. Fleet	1,552		
Liberal	J. Fisken	1,530		
Majority		234	1.8	N/A
Turnout		7,312		N/A
Conservative win (new seat)				
Labour win (new seat)				
Labour win (new seat)				

Richmond Hill
Party	Candidate	Votes	%	±%
Labour	M. Lyons	3,481	66.0	N/A
Labour	D. Hamilton	3,117		
Labour	W. Prichard	3,019		
Liberal	P. Gilbert	1,143	21.7	N/A
Liberal	A. Betts	1,114		
Liberal	K. Norman	972		
Conservative	A. Brookes	654	12.4	N/A
Conservative	B. Horrocks	593		
Conservative	J. Sibbald	534		
Majority		1,876	44.3	N/A
Turnout		5,278		N/A
Labour win (new seat)				
Labour win (new seat)				
Labour win (new seat)				

Rothwell
Party	Candidate	Votes	%	±%
Labour	R. Lund	3,963	58.3	N/A
Labour	B. Walker	3,748		
Labour	S. Hudson	3,554		
Conservative	D. Levison	1,782	26.2	N/A
Conservative	K. Sadler	1,750		
Conservative	D. Boyton	1,597		
Liberal	E. Russell	624	9.2	N/A
Liberal	A. Todd	607		
Liberal	A. Paton	594		
Independent Liberal	W. Mansfield	268	3.9	N/A
Communist	R. Horsbrough	166	2.4	N/A
Majority		1,772	32.1	N/A
Turnout		6,803		N/A
Labour win (new seat)				
Labour win (new seat)				
Labour win (new seat)				

Roundhay
Party	Candidate	Votes	%	±%
Conservative	P. Crotty	4,096	61.8	N/A
Conservative	J. Challenor	4,078		
Conservative	J. White	3,982		
Labour	B. Bloom	1,294	19.5	N/A
Labour	A. Barnard	1,247		
Labour	R. Mitchell	1,204		
Liberal	L. Thackray	939	14.2	N/A
Liberal	P. Arnold	863		
Liberal	S. Hollands	834		
Ecology	C. Hill	303	4.6	N/A
Ecology	S. Sykes	272		
Majority		2,688	42.2	N/A
Turnout		6,632		N/A
Conservative win (new seat)				
Conservative win (new seat)				
Conservative win (new seat)				

Seacroft
Party	Candidate	Votes	%	±%
Labour	George Mudie	3,758	78.5	N/A
Labour	D. Gabb	3,470		
Labour	A. Vollans	3,452		
Conservative	P. Hyde	727	15.2	N/A
Conservative	D. Townsley	702		
Conservative	F. Brownbridge	684		
Liberal	B. Selby	204	4.3	N/A
Liberal	G. Bratt	191		
Liberal	P. Julings	179		
Communist	B. Wilson	99	2.1	N/A
Majority		2,725	63.3	N/A
Turnout		4,788		N/A
Labour win (new seat)				
Labour win (new seat)				
Labour win (new seat)				

University
Party	Candidate	Votes	%	±%
Labour	W. Kilgallon	2,800	62.2	N/A
Labour	N. Jarosz	2,736		
Labour	D. Jenner	2,672		
Conservative	R. Boddington	767	17.0	N/A
Conservative	H. Woodhead	723		
Conservative	E. Warriner	706		
Liberal	N. Flood	591	13.1	N/A
Liberal	G. Prescott	494		
Liberal	E. Bee	472		
Communist	J. Rodgers	174	3.9	N/A
Ecology	S. Graves	170	3.8	N/A
Ecology	P. Newey	158		
Majority		2,033	45.2	N/A
Turnout		4,502		N/A
Labour win (new seat)				
Labour win (new seat)				
Labour win (new seat)				

Weetwood
Party	Candidate	Votes	%	±%
Conservative	R. Hall	2,861	46.2	N/A
Conservative	S. Gill	2,842		
Conservative	J. Hamilton	2,825		
Labour	K. Fenwick	1,854	30.0	N/A
Labour	M. Verity	1,751		
Labour	A. Jarosz	1,645		
Liberal	D. Gazey	1,049	17.0	N/A
Liberal	D. Archbold	973		
Liberal	P. Baxter	945		
Ecology	C. Nash	335	5.4	N/A
Residents	E. Leigh	89	1.4	N/A
Majority		971	16.3	N/A
Turnout		6,188		N/A
Conservative win (new seat)				
Conservative win (new seat)				
Conservative win (new seat)				

Wetherby
Party	Candidate	Votes	%	±%
Conservative	H. Gardiner	4,204	66.7	N/A
Conservative	D. Hudson	4,035		
Conservative	J. Gray	3,979		
Labour	J. Taylor	813	12.9	N/A
Labour	R. Bishop	758		
Labour	I. Adams	755		
Ecology	D. Rawson	660	10.5	N/A
Liberal	T. Burgess	628	10.0	N/A
Liberal	J. Scott	552		
Liberal	R. Morris	487		
Majority		3,166	53.8	N/A
Turnout		6,305		N/A
Conservative win (new seat)				
Conservative win (new seat)				
Conservative win (new seat)				

Whinmoor
Party	Candidate	Votes	%	±%
Labour	F. Stringer	2,912	54.5	N/A
Labour	E. Hewitt	2,623		
Labour	G. Platt	2,585		
Conservative	M. Beardsall	1,909	35.7	N/A
Conservative	W. Buckland	1,906		
Conservative	A. Woolman	1,844		
Liberal	N. Hudson	522	9.8	N/A
Liberal	J. Exley	508		
Liberal	A. Wood	502		
Majority		676	18.8	N/A
Turnout		5,343		N/A
Labour win (new seat)				
Labour win (new seat)				
Labour win (new seat)				

Wortley
Party	Candidate	Votes	%	±%
Labour	W. Thurlow	3,436	45.1	N/A
Labour	P. Fathers	3,170		
Labour	M. Bedford	3,051		
Conservative	R. Robson	2,136	28.0	N/A
Liberal	C. Greenfield	2,048	26.9	N/A
Conservative	H. Connah	2,023		
Conservative	F. Stubley	1,999		
Liberal	W. Moss	1,847		
Liberal	D. Jones	1,758		
Majority		915	17.1	N/A
Turnout		7,620		N/A
Labour win (new seat)				
Labour win (new seat)				
Labour win (new seat)				
