= 1990 Leeds City Council election =

1990 UK local government election

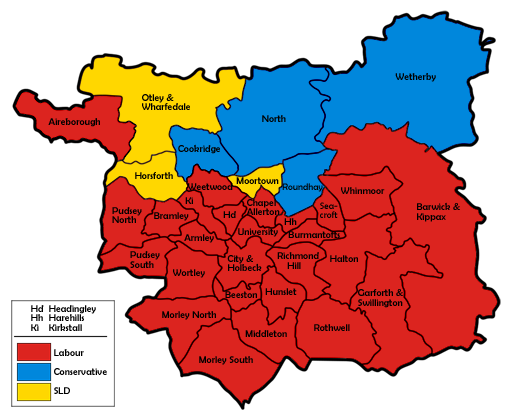
Map of the results for the 1990 Leeds council election.

The 1990 Leeds City Council elections were held on Thursday, 4 May 1990, with one third of the council and two casual vacancies in Beeston and North to be elected. There had been a number of by-elections in the interim, resulting in two Labour gains in Armley and Burmantofts from the Social and Liberal Democrats and holds elsewhere.

The election was held amidst deep unpopularity for the Conservative national government and their poll tax measure, resulting in the party's worst ever performance in the English locals. The effects it had in Leeds were no less severe, with the party obtaining a record low vote share, with their victories confined to just 4 of the 33 wards, restricted to their Northern heartlands – Cookridge, North, Roundhay and Wetherby – losing stalwarts Aireborough, Halton, Pudsey North and Weetwood to Labour for the first time.

Both the Conservative vote and the SLD vote were little changed from the previous election; the landslide was caused by a remarkable increase in Labour's vote – over 50% on recent elections – bringing with it a record turnout (with 1979 omitted). The SLD's slate was notably much reduced, fielding their lowest number of candidates since the 1978 election, after their fall-back at their last outing. Similar to the last election, their sole loss was found in Armley to Labour, narrowly holding onto Otley and Wharfedale, but much more comfortably their Horsforth and Moortown seats. In total, Labour's five gains extended their majority by ten, comfortably surpassing party records in votes, vote share and council majority.

Elsewhere, the leader of the newly formed Liberal Party Michael Meadowcroft – alongside his fellow candidate in Harehills – won a respectable second place in Bramley. Meanwhile, their fellow SLD defectors, the SDP joined the Communists in producing just one candidate – with both collecting negligible support, suggesting possible demise (with the latter likely adversely impacted by recent international events).

== Election result ==
Leeds local election result 1990
Party	Seats	Gains	Losses	Net gain/loss	Seats %	Votes %	Votes	+/−
Labour	27	5	0	+5	77.1	56.1	141,610	+9.9
Conservative	5	0	4	-4	14.3	26.7	67,284	-6.3
SLD	3	0	1	-1	8.6	14.4	36,325	-2.7
Green	0	0	0	0	0.0	1.4	3,481	+0.6
Liberal	0	0	0	0	0.0	1.0	2,623	+1.0
Independent	0	0	0	0	0.0	0.2	626	-1.6
SDP	0	0	0	0	0.0	0.1	256	-0.8
National Front	0	0	0	0	0.0	0.0	109	+0.0
Communist	0	0	0	0	0.0	0.0	67	-0.2

This result has the following consequences for the total number of seats on the council after the elections:

Party	Previous council	New council
Labour	61	66
Conservative	25	21
SLD	12	11
Independent	1	1
Total	99	99
Working majority	23	33

== Ward results ==
Aireborough
Party	Candidate	Votes	%	±%
Labour	M. Dunn	4,672	45.3	+14.1
Conservative	M. Atkinson	3,914	38.0	−5.8
SLD	D. Gowland	1,726	16.7	−8.3
Majority		758	7.4	−5.1
Turnout		10,312		
Labour gain from Conservative		Swing	+9.9	

Armley
Party	Candidate	Votes	%	±%
Labour	A. Lowe	4,788	67.0	+12.1
Conservative	R. Mundell	1,256	17.6	−1.6
SLD	D. Colton	1,099	15.4	−10.4
Majority		3,532	49.4	+22.5
Turnout		7,143		
Labour gain from SLD		Swing	+11.2	

Barwick and Kippax
Party	Candidate	Votes	%	±%
Labour	J. Parker	6,002	62.7	+3.9
Conservative	John Procter	2,532	26.5	−8.7
SLD	G. Roberts	600	6.3	+0.3
Green	D. Corry	436	4.6	+4.6
Majority		3,470	36.3	+12.6
Turnout		9,570		
Labour hold		Swing	+6.3	

Beeston
Party	Candidate	Votes	%	±%
Labour	Jon Trickett	4,180	72.3	+4.5
Labour	D. Congreve	3,690		
Conservative	A. Rhodes	1,009	17.5	−7.5
Conservative	H. Woodhead	929		
Green	D. Blakemore	590	10.2	+10.2
Majority		3,171	54.9	+12.0
Turnout		5,779		
Labour hold		Swing		
Labour hold		Swing	+6.0	

Bramley
Party	Candidate	Votes	%	±%
Labour	D. Atkinson	4,867	65.9	−2.9
Liberal	Michael Meadowcroft	1,831	24.8	+24.8
Conservative	T. Cooper	689	9.3	−7.4
Majority		3,036	41.1	−10.9
Turnout		7,387		
Labour hold		Swing	-13.8	

Burmantofts
Party	Candidate	Votes	%	±%
Labour	S. Butterfield	4,267	63.7	+19.4
SLD	T. Ineson	2,030	30.3	−19.2
Conservative	C. Wilson	399	6.0	−0.2
Majority		2,237	33.4	+28.3
Turnout		6,696		
Labour hold		Swing	+19.3	

Chapel Allerton
Party	Candidate	Votes	%	±%
Labour	N. Taggart	4,772	72.7	+7.3
Conservative	P. Lawton	1,215	18.5	−5.4
SLD	J. Levy	578	8.8	+3.6
Majority		3,557	54.2	+12.8
Turnout		6,565		
Labour hold		Swing	+6.4	

City and Holbeck
Party	Candidate	Votes	%	±%
Labour	C. Myers	4,843	79.1	+2.1
SLD	A. Davies	701	11.5	+3.8
Conservative	D. Boynton	576	9.4	−6.0
Majority		4,142	67.7	+6.1
Turnout		6,120		
Labour hold		Swing	-0.8	

Cookridge
Party	Candidate	Votes	%	±%
Conservative	J. Carter	4,143	48.8	−11.5
Labour	G. Morrison	3,063	36.1	+13.0
SLD	E. Brazier	1,278	15.1	+3.8
Majority		1,080	12.7	−24.5
Turnout		8,484		
Conservative hold		Swing	-12.2	

Garforth and Swillington
Party	Candidate	Votes	%	±%
Labour	A. Groves	6,239	67.1	+9.7
Conservative	C. Jones	2,133	23.0	−13.2
SLD	R. Hutchinson	921	9.9	+3.6
Majority		4,106	44.2	+22.9
Turnout		9,293		
Labour hold		Swing	+11.4	

Halton
Party	Candidate	Votes	%	±%
Labour	J. Sully	3,840	44.9	+11.1
Conservative	D. Schofield	3,569	41.7	−12.9
SLD	D. Hollingsworth	1,149	13.4	+1.7
Majority		271	3.2	−17.6
Turnout		8,558		
Labour gain from Conservative		Swing	+12.0	

Harehills
Party	Candidate	Votes	%	±%
Labour	U. Ryatt	3,906	64.8	−0.7
Liberal	R. Senior	792	13.1	+13.1
Conservative	K. Weightman	708	11.7	−3.7
Independent	S. Prasad	449	7.4	+7.4
Independent	D. Talbot	177	2.9	+2.9
Majority		3,114	51.6	+5.2
Turnout		6,032		
Labour hold		Swing	-6.9	

Headingley
Party	Candidate	Votes	%	±%
Labour	Paul Truswell	3,965	55.1	+13.3
SLD	C. Shaw	1,250	17.4	−12.7
Conservative	G. Castle	1,058	14.7	−0.7
Green	G. Rainford	850	11.8	+2.4
Communist	B. Cooper	67	0.9	−2.3
Majority		2,715	37.8	+26.0
Turnout		7,190		
Labour hold		Swing	+13.0	

Horsforth
Party	Candidate	Votes	%	±%
SLD	M. Shaw	3,756	42.4	−2.1
Conservative	R. Richardson	3,032	34.2	−5.8
Labour	J. Erskine	2,072	23.4	+7.9
Majority		724	8.2	+3.7
Turnout		8,860		
SLD hold		Swing	+1.8	

Hunslet
Party	Candidate	Votes	%	±%
Labour	John Gunnell	4,619	91.0	+13.1
Conservative	D. Thomas	458	9.0	−1.5
Majority		4,161	82.0	+14.7
Turnout		5,077		
Labour hold		Swing	+7.3	

Kirkstall
Party	Candidate	Votes	%	±%
Labour	Bernard Atha	5,507	81.8	+15.3
Conservative	S. McBarron	1,229	18.2	−0.8
Majority		4,278	63.5	+16.1
Turnout		6,736		
Labour hold		Swing	+8.0	

Middleton
Party	Candidate	Votes	%	±%
Labour	L. Middleton	4,876	85.6	+8.2
Conservative	A. Wright	823	14.4	−1.4
Majority		4,053	71.1	+9.6
Turnout		5,699		
Labour hold		Swing	+4.8	

Moortown
Party	Candidate	Votes	%	±%
SLD	W. Winlow	3,737	44.9	−2.7
Conservative	C. Thompson	2,430	29.2	−4.9
Labour	J. Talbot	2,164	26.0	+7.6
Majority		1,307	15.7	+2.2
Turnout		8,331		
SLD hold		Swing	+1.1	

Morley North
Party	Candidate	Votes	%	±%
Labour	F. Jones	5,390	66.0	+15.2
Conservative	J. Galek	2,772	34.0	−5.6
Majority		2,618	32.1	+20.9
Turnout		8,162		
Labour hold		Swing	+10.4	

Morley South
Party	Candidate	Votes	%	±%
Labour	K. Burnley	5,857	67.9	+4.4
Conservative	L. Frost	1,858	21.5	−7.8
SLD	T. Leadley	803	9.3	+2.2
National Front	N. Howard	109	1.3	+1.3
Majority		3,999	46.4	+12.2
Turnout		8,627		
Labour hold		Swing	+6.1	

North
Party	Candidate	Votes	%	±%
Conservative	R. Manning	3,795	49.9	−7.7
Conservative	P. Harrand	3,621		
Labour	B. Brady	2,432	32.0	+8.3
Labour	J. Lister	2,206		
SLD	R. Barr	1,115	14.7	+1.0
SLD	D. Dresser	1,091		
SDP	B. Finniestone	256	3.4	−1.6
Majority		1,363	17.9	−16.0
Turnout		7,598		
Conservative hold		Swing		
Conservative hold		Swing	-8.0	

Otley and Wharfedale
Party	Candidate	Votes	%	±%
SLD	C. Campbell	3,681	35.9	+1.2
Conservative	G. Francis	3,560	34.7	−11.9
Labour	S. Egan	3,009	29.4	+15.8
Majority		121	1.2	−10.7
Turnout		10,250		
SLD hold		Swing	+6.5	

Pudsey North
Party	Candidate	Votes	%	±%
Labour	A. Ross	4,304	45.3	+15.9
Conservative	J. Bashall	3,295	34.7	−17.0
SLD	J. Heppell	1,897	20.0	+1.1
Majority		1,009	10.6	−11.6
Turnout		9,496		
Labour gain from Conservative		Swing	+16.4	

Pudsey South
Party	Candidate	Votes	%	±%
Labour	R. Lewis	4,734	56.4	+26.8
Conservative	R. Cam	2,147	25.6	+4.6
SLD	A. Fleet	1,508	18.0	+15.0
Majority		2,587	30.8	+14.0
Turnout		8,389		
Labour hold		Swing	+11.1	

Richmond Hill
Party	Candidate	Votes	%	±%
Labour	E. McGee	5,141	80.1	+1.0
SLD	K. Norman	787	12.3	+2.6
Conservative	W. Birch	490	7.6	−3.5
Majority		4,354	67.8	−0.2
Turnout		6,418		
Labour hold		Swing	-0.8	

Rothwell
Party	Candidate	Votes	%	±%
Labour	A. Hudson	4,695	63.1	−3.4
Conservative	A. Heeson	1,464	19.7	−6.3
SLD	A. Barber	1,276	17.2	+9.6
Majority		3,231	43.5	+3.0
Turnout		7,435		
Labour hold		Swing	+1.4	

Roundhay
Party	Candidate	Votes	%	±%
Conservative	J. White	3,826	46.8	−10.0
Labour	K. Prior	2,844	34.8	+10.2
SLD	J. Pullan	862	10.5	−3.6
Green	A. Tear	643	7.9	+3.4
Majority		982	12.0	−20.2
Turnout		8,175		
Conservative hold		Swing	-10.1	

Seacroft
Party	Candidate	Votes	%	±%
Labour	A. Vollans	4,729	82.4	+1.1
Conservative	H. Gill	591	10.3	−3.3
SLD	S. Fisher	421	7.3	+2.2
Majority		4,138	72.1	+4.4
Turnout		5,741		
Labour hold		Swing	+2.2	

University
Party	Candidate	Votes	%	±%
Labour	B. Dale	3,883	72.8	−2.0
Conservative	R. Winfield	553	10.4	−3.4
Green	A. Begg	491	9.2	+9.2
SLD	A. Appleyard	405	7.6	−0.3
Majority		3,330	62.5	−1.4
Turnout		5,332		
Labour hold		Swing	+0.7	

Weetwood
Party	Candidate	Votes	%	±%
Labour	E. Moxon	3,313	41.0	+11.6
Conservative	J. Hamilton	2,794	34.5	−8.0
SLD	J. Ewens	1,509	18.7	−6.3
Green	C. Nash	471	5.8	+2.7
Majority		519	6.4	−6.7
Turnout		8,087		
Labour gain from Conservative		Swing	+9.8	

Wetherby
Party	Candidate	Votes	%	±%
Conservative	J. Evans	5,899	60.3	−6.7
Labour	J. Postill	2,612	26.7	+10.7
SLD	J. Macarthur	1,266	12.9	+2.4
Majority		3,287	33.6	−17.3
Turnout		9,777		
Conservative hold		Swing	-8.7	

Whinmoor
Party	Candidate	Votes	%	±%
Labour	M. Hemmingway	4,439	65.4	+8.1
Conservative	P. Rayner	1,735	25.6	−10.9
SLD	C. Ward	615	9.1	+2.8
Majority		2,704	39.8	+19.0
Turnout		6,789		
Labour hold		Swing	+9.5	

Wortley
Party	Candidate	Votes	%	±%
Labour	M. Bedford	5,586	67.5	+7.9
Conservative	B. Nicol	1,489	18.0	−4.4
SLD	W. Moss	1,198	14.5	−3.5
Majority		4,097	49.5	+12.2
Turnout		8,273		
Labour hold		Swing	+6.1	
