= 1969 Leeds City Council election =

Local election in the United Kingdom

The 1969 Leeds municipal election was held on 8 May 1969, with one third of the councillors up for election. The Conservative incumbent in Armley had defected to Independent Conservative in the interim and hoped to defend it as such.

In contrast to their performance nationally, the Tories fell back upon their peak the previous year, with Labour managing to stabilise their support somewhat. The sole beneficiary (unlike last year, the Communists dropped back to their normal support) were the Liberals, who obtained their largest vote since 1963. In total three seats changed hands, with a spectacular gain in West Hunslet by the Liberals from the Conservatives, another loss of the latter's to Labour in Osmondthorpe, offset a little by a comfortable win back in Armley from their former incumbent.

== Election result ==
Leeds local election result 1969
| Party | Seats | Gains | Losses | Net gain/loss | Seats % | Votes % | Votes | +/− |
|---|---|---|---|---|---|---|---|---|
| Conservative | 23 | 1 | 2 | -1 | 76.7 | 58.7 | 62,949 | -2.6 |
| Labour | 5 | 1 | 0 | +1 | 16.7 | 27.9 | 29,872 | -0.0 |
| Liberal | 2 | 1 | 0 | +1 | 6.7 | 11.3 | 12,099 | +6.8 |
| Communist | 0 | 0 | 0 | 0 | 0.0 | 1.7 | 1,879 | -4.4 |
| Ind. Conservative | 0 | 0 | 1 | -1 | 0.0 | 0.4 | 400 | +0.4 |

The result had the following consequences for the total number of seats on the Council after the elections:

| Party | Previous council | | New council | |
| Party | Cllr | Ald | Cllr | Ald |
|---|---|---|---|---|
| Conservatives | 74 | 25 | 73 | 25 |
| Labour | 12 | 5 | 13 | 5 |
| Liberals | 3 | 0 | 4 | 0 |
| Independent Conservative | 1 | 0 | 0 | 0 |
| Total | 90 | 30 | 90 | 30 |
| Total | 120 | | 120 | |
| Working majority | 58 | 20 | 56 | 20 |
| Working majority | 78 | | 76 | |

== Ward results ==
Armley
| Party | Candidate | Votes | % | ±% |
|---|---|---|---|---|
| Conservative | G. Mathers | 1,743 | 38.5 | −15.7 |
| Liberal | J. Saxton | 1,318 | 29.1 | +29.1 |
| Labour | J. Bissell | 989 | 21.9 | −15.0 |
| Ind. Conservative | G. Atkinson | 400 | 8.8 | +8.8 |
| Communist | P. Wilson | 72 | 1.6 | −7.3 |
| Majority | | 425 | 9.4 | −8.0 |
| Turnout | | 4,522 | | |
| Conservative hold | | Swing | -22.4 | |

Beeston
| Party | Candidate | Votes | % | ±% |
|---|---|---|---|---|
| Conservative | A. Hartley | 2,547 | 61.1 | −5.2 |
| Labour | J. Hodkinson | 1,212 | 29.1 | −1.0 |
| Liberal | L. Kent | 408 | 9.8 | +9.8 |
| Majority | | 1,335 | 32.0 | −4.3 |
| Turnout | | 4,167 | | |
| Conservative hold | | Swing | -2.1 | |

Bramley
| Party | Candidate | Votes | % | ±% |
|---|---|---|---|---|
| Conservative | A. Robinson | 2,025 | 54.2 | −3.0 |
| Labour | M. Chadwick | 998 | 26.7 | −8.5 |
| Liberal | A. Fleet | 712 | 19.1 | +19.1 |
| Majority | | 1,027 | 27.5 | +5.6 |
| Turnout | | 3,735 | | |
| Conservative hold | | Swing | +2.7 | |

Burley
| Party | Candidate | Votes | % | ±% |
|---|---|---|---|---|
| Conservative | D. Ramsden | 1,852 | 66.2 | +4.3 |
| Labour | S. Whelan | 706 | 25.3 | −6.7 |
| Communist | S. Walker | 238 | 8.5 | +2.4 |
| Majority | | 1,146 | 41.0 | +11.1 |
| Turnout | | 2,796 | | |
| Conservative hold | | Swing | +5.5 | |

Burmantofts
| Party | Candidate | Votes | % | ±% |
|---|---|---|---|---|
| Conservative | Christine Thomas | 1,956 | 49.8 | +0.1 |
| Labour | Joyce Gould | 1,843 | 47.0 | +4.0 |
| Communist | F. Stockdale | 126 | 3.2 | −4.1 |
| Majority | | 113 | 2.9 | −3.9 |
| Turnout | | 3,925 | | |
| Conservative hold | | Swing | -1.9 | |

Castleton
| Party | Candidate | Votes | % | ±% |
|---|---|---|---|---|
| Liberal | C. Tucker | 2,081 | 54.6 | +9.1 |
| Labour | K. Cohen | 1,051 | 27.6 | +1.6 |
| Conservative | C. Johnson | 624 | 16.4 | −5.6 |
| Communist | J. Corscadden | 52 | 1.4 | −5.1 |
| Majority | | 1,030 | 27.0 | +7.4 |
| Turnout | | 3,808 | | |
| Liberal hold | | Swing | +3.7 | |

Chapel Allerton
| Party | Candidate | Votes | % | ±% |
|---|---|---|---|---|
| Conservative | R. Hunt | 3,120 | 86.0 | +0.8 |
| Labour | A. Baum | 263 | 7.2 | −3.9 |
| Liberal | Deryck Ernest Senior | 246 | 6.8 | +6.8 |
| Majority | | 2,857 | 78.7 | +4.7 |
| Turnout | | 3,629 | | |
| Conservative hold | | Swing | +2.3 | |

City
| Party | Candidate | Votes | % | ±% |
|---|---|---|---|---|
| Labour | Doreen Jenner | 1,388 | 53.5 | +4.7 |
| Conservative | J. Klineberg | 1,113 | 42.9 | −1.7 |
| Communist | T. Johnson | 94 | 3.6 | −3.0 |
| Majority | | 275 | 10.6 | +6.4 |
| Turnout | | 2,595 | | |
| Labour hold | | Swing | +3.2 | |

Cookridge
| Party | Candidate | Votes | % | ±% |
|---|---|---|---|---|
| Conservative | D. Jenkins | 3,337 | 74.4 | +0.8 |
| Labour | F. Davis | 678 | 15.1 | +5.2 |
| Liberal | J. Davies | 471 | 10.5 | −1.9 |
| Majority | | 2,659 | 59.3 | −1.9 |
| Turnout | | 4,486 | | |
| Conservative hold | | Swing | -2.2 | |

East Hunslet
| Party | Candidate | Votes | % | ±% |
|---|---|---|---|---|
| Labour | W. Parker | 1,416 | 57.7 | −4.3 |
| Conservative | I. Holmes | 558 | 22.8 | −7.3 |
| Liberal | G. Beever | 478 | 19.5 | +19.5 |
| Majority | | 858 | 35.0 | +3.0 |
| Turnout | | 2,452 | | |
| Labour hold | | Swing | +1.5 | |

Gipton
| Party | Candidate | Votes | % | ±% |
|---|---|---|---|---|
| Conservative | M. Suttenstall | 2,014 | 61.1 | +5.7 |
| Labour | J. Gore | 1,219 | 37.0 | −1.1 |
| Communist | J. Bellamy | 61 | 1.9 | −4.6 |
| Majority | | 795 | 24.1 | +6.8 |
| Turnout | | 3,294 | | |
| Conservative hold | | Swing | +3.4 | |

Halton
| Party | Candidate | Votes | % | ±% |
|---|---|---|---|---|
| Conservative | Martin Dodgson | 4,659 | 85.9 | +4.3 |
| Labour | E. Coward | 587 | 10.8 | −0.9 |
| Communist | S. Jones | 180 | 3.3 | −3.4 |
| Majority | | 4,072 | 75.0 | +5.2 |
| Turnout | | 5,426 | | |
| Conservative hold | | Swing | +2.6 | |

Harehills
| Party | Candidate | Votes | % | ±% |
|---|---|---|---|---|
| Conservative | A. Cummings | 1,986 | 76.7 | −3.1 |
| Labour | W. Spence | 304 | 11.7 | −1.5 |
| Liberal | D. Freethy | 298 | 11.5 | +11.5 |
| Majority | | 1,682 | 65.0 | −1.6 |
| Turnout | | 2,588 | | |
| Conservative hold | | Swing | -0.8 | |

Headingley
| Party | Candidate | Votes | % | ±% |
|---|---|---|---|---|
| Conservative | E. Clark | 3,097 | 79.7 | +8.0 |
| Labour | G. Wood | 437 | 11.2 | +0.5 |
| Liberal | M. Stevens | 353 | 9.1 | −3.5 |
| Majority | | 2,660 | 68.4 | +9.3 |
| Turnout | | 3,887 | | |
| Conservative hold | | Swing | +3.7 | |

Holbeck
| Party | Candidate | Votes | % | ±% |
|---|---|---|---|---|
| Labour | Bernard Atha | 1,306 | 47.4 | −7.6 |
| Liberal | R. Whitelock | 830 | 30.1 | +30.1 |
| Conservative | J. Bateman | 622 | 22.6 | −12.4 |
| Majority | | 476 | 17.3 | −2.7 |
| Turnout | | 2,758 | | |
| Labour hold | | Swing | -18.8 | |

Kirkstall
| Party | Candidate | Votes | % | ±% |
|---|---|---|---|---|
| Conservative | J. Horrocks | 2,898 | 57.9 | −3.6 |
| Labour | D. Matthews | 1,639 | 32.7 | −0.3 |
| Liberal | J. Grant | 381 | 7.6 | +7.6 |
| Communist | J. Sidebottom | 88 | 1.8 | −3.8 |
| Majority | | 1,259 | 25.1 | −3.3 |
| Turnout | | 5,006 | | |
| Conservative hold | | Swing | -1.6 | |

Middleton
| Party | Candidate | Votes | % | ±% |
|---|---|---|---|---|
| Labour | A. Malcolm | 1,606 | 54.0 | −1.4 |
| Liberal | J. Crashaw | 683 | 23.0 | +23.0 |
| Conservative | B. Rawson | 488 | 16.4 | −17.1 |
| Communist | D. Priscott | 197 | 6.6 | −4.4 |
| Majority | | 923 | 31.0 | +9.1 |
| Turnout | | 2,974 | | |
| Labour hold | | Swing | -12.2 | |

Moortown
| Party | Candidate | Votes | % | ±% |
|---|---|---|---|---|
| Conservative | A. Redmond | 2,740 | 74.1 | −0.5 |
| Liberal | E. Nevies | 545 | 14.7 | +3.1 |
| Labour | C. Bloom | 414 | 11.2 | +1.2 |
| Majority | | 2,195 | 59.3 | −3.6 |
| Turnout | | 3,699 | | |
| Conservative hold | | Swing | -1.8 | |

Osmondthorpe
| Party | Candidate | Votes | % | ±% |
|---|---|---|---|---|
| Labour | W. Prichard | 1,812 | 49.8 | +6.5 |
| Conservative | L. Horton | 1,663 | 45.7 | −0.5 |
| Communist | T. Kelly | 163 | 4.5 | −6.0 |
| Majority | | 149 | 4.1 | +1.2 |
| Turnout | | 3,638 | | |
| Labour gain from Conservative | | Swing | +3.5 | |

Richmond Hill
| Party | Candidate | Votes | % | ±% |
|---|---|---|---|---|
| Conservative | H. Levey | 1,709 | 54.6 | −0.6 |
| Labour | J. Mathers | 1,188 | 38.0 | +1.2 |
| Liberal | D. McAllister | 133 | 4.2 | +4.2 |
| Communist | P. Fawcett | 100 | 3.2 | −0.8 |
| Majority | | 521 | 16.6 | −1.8 |
| Turnout | | 3,130 | | |
| Conservative hold | | Swing | -0.9 | |

Roundhay
| Party | Candidate | Votes | % | ±% |
|---|---|---|---|---|
| Conservative | A. Johnson | 3,316 | 91.3 | +3.5 |
| Labour | Douglas Gabb | 316 | 8.7 | +1.5 |
| Majority | | 3,000 | 82.6 | +2.0 |
| Turnout | | 3,632 | | |
| Conservative hold | | Swing | +1.0 | |

Scott Hall
| Party | Candidate | Votes | % | ±% |
|---|---|---|---|---|
| Conservative | V. Darnton | 1,429 | 75.5 | +24.7 |
| Labour | R. Sedler | 464 | 24.5 | −8.3 |
| Majority | | 965 | 51.0 | +33.0 |
| Turnout | | 1,893 | | |
| Conservative hold | | Swing | +16.5 | |

Seacroft
| Party | Candidate | Votes | % | ±% |
|---|---|---|---|---|
| Conservative | E. McQuire | 1,642 | 49.5 | +2.9 |
| Labour | J. Moran | 1,544 | 46.6 | +2.3 |
| Communist | H. Besser | 130 | 3.9 | −5.3 |
| Majority | | 98 | 3.0 | +0.6 |
| Turnout | | 3,316 | | |
| Conservative hold | | Swing | +0.3 | |

Stanningley
| Party | Candidate | Votes | % | ±% |
|---|---|---|---|---|
| Conservative | I. Benton | 1,991 | 51.8 | +5.3 |
| Labour | Kevin Gould | 1,689 | 44.0 | +5.3 |
| Communist | F. Sidebottom | 160 | 4.2 | −0.4 |
| Majority | | 302 | 7.9 | +0.1 |
| Turnout | | 3,840 | | |
| Conservative hold | | Swing | +0.0 | |

Talbot
| Party | Candidate | Votes | % | ±% |
|---|---|---|---|---|
| Conservative | P. Brayshay | 3,398 | 87.5 | +0.4 |
| Labour | A. Vollans | 487 | 12.5 | +2.9 |
| Majority | | 2,911 | 74.9 | −2.5 |
| Turnout | | 3,885 | | |
| Conservative hold | | Swing | -1.2 | |

Weetwood
| Party | Candidate | Votes | % | ±% |
|---|---|---|---|---|
| Conservative | R. Rostron | 3,789 | 81.3 | +5.1 |
| Liberal | W. Beaumont | 583 | 12.5 | −2.5 |
| Labour | C. Collinge | 287 | 6.2 | +2.3 |
| Majority | | 3,206 | 68.8 | +7.5 |
| Turnout | | 4,659 | | |
| Conservative hold | | Swing | +3.8 | |

West Hunslet
| Party | Candidate | Votes | % | ±% |
|---|---|---|---|---|
| Liberal | Dennis Pedder | 2,104 | 54.8 | +54.8 |
| Conservative | M. Waddington | 1,038 | 27.0 | −28.8 |
| Labour | A. Donohoe | 698 | 18.2 | −17.3 |
| Majority | | 1,066 | 27.8 | +7.4 |
| Turnout | | 3,840 | | |
| Liberal gain from Conservative | | Swing | +41.8 | |

Whinmoor
| Party | Candidate | Votes | % | ±% |
|---|---|---|---|---|
| Conservative | Peggy White | 1,329 | 49.5 | +0.7 |
| Labour | L. Jackson | 1,305 | 48.6 | +4.1 |
| Communist | W. Rumbelow | 49 | 1.8 | −4.8 |
| Majority | | 24 | 0.9 | −3.4 |
| Turnout | | 2,683 | | |
| Conservative hold | | Swing | -1.7 | |

Woodhouse
| Party | Candidate | Votes | % | ±% |
|---|---|---|---|---|
| Conservative | P. Fingret | 1,856 | 63.1 | +0.7 |
| Labour | Eric Atkinson | 916 | 31.1 | +3.0 |
| Communist | L. Morris | 169 | 5.7 | −3.7 |
| Majority | | 940 | 32.0 | −2.2 |
| Turnout | | 2,941 | | |
| Conservative hold | | Swing | -1.1 | |

Wortley
| Party | Candidate | Votes | % | ±% |
|---|---|---|---|---|
| Conservative | F. Stubley | 2,410 | 60.3 | −3.7 |
| Labour | W. Thurlow | 1,110 | 27.8 | +6.1 |
| Liberal | Walter Holdsworth | 475 | 11.9 | +1.0 |
| Majority | | 1,300 | 32.5 | −9.9 |
| Turnout | | 3,995 | | |
| Conservative hold | | Swing | -4.9 | |
