= Bernard Atha =

British politician (1928–2022)

Bernard Atha CBE

Lord Mayor of Leeds
- In office 2000–2001
- Preceded by: Keith Parker
- Succeeded by: David Hudson

Leeds City Councillor for Kirkstall Ward
- In office 1973–2014
- Preceded by: R. Robertson
- Succeeded by: Fiona Venner

Leeds City Councillor for Holbeck Ward
- In office 1969–1973
- Preceded by: W. Smith
- Succeeded by: Ward abolished

Leeds City Councillor for City Ward
- In office 1957–1968
- Preceded by: E. Stubbs
- Succeeded by: Ward abolished

Personal details
- Born: Bernard Peter Atha; 27 August 1928 Leeds, England
- Died: 22 October 2022 (aged 94)
- Party: Labour
- Education: Lawnswood School
- Alma mater: University of Leeds

Bernard Peter Atha CBE (27 August 1928 – 22 October 2022) was an English politician and actor. He served as Lord Mayor of Leeds and was a major figure in the arts and sport in West Yorkshire and elsewhere; he also appeared in a number of films. He was a Law lecturer at Huddersfield Technical College in the 1970s

== Life and career ==
Atha was born in Leeds on 27 August 1928, and educated at Leeds Modern School, now Lawnswood School, and the University of Leeds.

In Ken Loach's film Kes (1969) Atha played the part of the Careers Officer who genuinely tries to suggest various career possibilities to the completely uninterested schoolboy, Billy, but the interview's outcome "throws Billy on the scrap heap". He also had small roles in the Ken Loach films Family Life (1971) and Black Jack (1979). Atha's television credits include roles in the series All Creatures Great and Small, Sherlock Holmes, Coronation Street, Emmerdale and Last of the Summer Wine.

Atha served as Lord Mayor of Leeds from 2000 to 2001. During his mayoralty he selected 18 "high-profile, well-known Yorkshire women" to act in turn as his Lady Mayoress, a role traditionally taken by the spouse or another family member of the mayor.

Atha was appointed Commander of the Order of the British Empire (CBE) in the 2007 Birthday Honours "for services to the Arts and to the community in Leeds", having earlier been appointed Officer of the Order of the British Empire (OBE) in the 1991 New Year Honours "for services to Sport, particularly Sport for the Disabled". He died on 22 October 2022, at the age of 94.

Civic offices
Preceded by Keith Parker	Lord Mayor of Leeds; 2000–2001	Succeeded by David Hudson
