= 1973 Leeds City Council election =

1973 UK local government election

The first elections to the newly created Leeds City Council were held on 10 May 1973, with the entirety of the 96 seat council – three seats for each of the 32 wards – up for vote. The Local Government Act 1972 stipulated that the elected members were to shadow and eventually take over from the predecessor corporation on 1 April 1974. The order in which the councillors were elected dictated their term serving, with third-place candidates serving two years and up for re-election in 1975, second-placed three years expiring in 1976 and 1st-placed five years until 1978.

As well as replacing the County Borough of Leeds, the new council included:

- Municipal Borough of Morley
- Municipal Borough of Pudsey
- Aireborough Urban District
- Horsforth Urban District
- Otley Urban District
- Garforth Urban District
- Rothwell Urban District
- Tadcaster Rural District (part)
- Wetherby Rural District
- Wharfedale Rural District

The election resulted in no overall control.

== Election result ==
Leeds local election result 1973
Party	Seats	Gains	Losses	Net gain/loss	Seats %	Votes %	Votes	+/−
Labour	44	0	0	0	45.8	40.4	69,696	N/A
Conservative	38	0	0	0	39.6	41.1	70,906	N/A
Liberal	14	0	0	0	14.6	16.3	28,141	N/A
Independent	0	0	0	0	0.0	1.0	1,763	N/A
Communist	0	0	0	0	0.0	0.7	1,134	N/A
Independent Labour	0	0	0	0	0.0	0.3	564	N/A
National Front	0	0	0	0	0.0	0.2	314	N/A

This result has the following consequences for the total number of seats on the council after the elections:

Party	New council
Labour	44
Conservatives	38
Liberals	14
Total	96
Working majority	0

== Ward results ==
Aireborough
Party	Candidate	Votes	%	±%
Conservative	W. Hudson	4,808	53.0	N/A
Conservative	H. Freeman	4,724		
Conservative	R. Cartwright	4,658		
Labour	C. Hardwick	2,938	32.4	N/A
Labour	P. Booth	2,794		
Labour	R. Oddy	2,778		
Liberal	R. Lee	1,330	14.7	N/A
Liberal	R. Bell	1,259		
Liberal	J. Harrison	1,225		
Majority		1,720	20.6	N/A
Turnout		9,076		N/A
Conservative win (new seat)				
Conservative win (new seat)				
Conservative win (new seat)				

Armley and Castleton
Party	Candidate	Votes	%	±%
Liberal	Michael Meadowcroft	4,468	60.4	N/A
Liberal	Christopher John Greenfield	4,111		
Liberal	B. Nelson	4,046		
Labour	J. Dixon	2,026	27.4	N/A
Labour	C. Buttery	1,875		
Labour	R. Sedler	1,869		
Conservative	H. Stephenson	775	10.5	N/A
Conservative	H. Hinchcliffe	765		
Conservative	N. Thompson	738		
Communist	P. Wilton	123	1.7	N/A
Majority		2,020	33.0	N/A
Turnout		7,392		N/A
Liberal win (new seat)				
Liberal win (new seat)				
Liberal win (new seat)				

Beeston and Holbeck
Party	Candidate	Votes	%	±%
Labour	A. Beevers	3,063	54.4	N/A
Labour	A. Barnard	2,892		
Labour	H. Booth	2,671		
Conservative	R. Barker	1,650	29.3	N/A
Conservative	E. Lucas	1,500		
Conservative	N. Skinn	1,491		
Liberal	J. Leighton	914	16.2	N/A
Liberal	L. Ellis	901		
Liberal	P. Jones	850		
Majority		1,021	25.1	N/A
Turnout		5,627		N/A
Labour win (new seat)				
Labour win (new seat)				
Labour win (new seat)				

Bramley
Party	Candidate	Votes	%	±%
Labour	E. Atkinson	2,025	53.9	N/A
Labour	A. Atkinson	1,984		
Labour	E. Millet	1,932		
Liberal	J. Honnoraty	867	23.1	N/A
Conservative	J. Brighthart	864	23.0	N/A
Conservative	H. Cox	839		
Liberal	T. Wood	820		
Conservative	R. Galley	802		
Liberal	J. Clayforth	782		
Majority		1,065	30.8	N/A
Turnout		3,756		N/A
Labour win (new seat)				
Labour win (new seat)				
Labour win (new seat)				

Burley
Party	Candidate	Votes	%	±%
Labour	A. Donohue	1,268	39.4	N/A
Conservative	R. Forbes	1,150	35.7	N/A
Labour	J. Roche	1,117		
Labour	S. Akbar	1,105		
Conservative	R. Hare	1,100		
Conservative	J. Adamson	1,055		
Liberal	S. Carnett	689	21.4	N/A
Liberal	E. Vasey	680		
Liberal	J. Wright	605		
Communist	D. Secker	114	3.5	N/A
Majority		17	3.7	N/A
Turnout		3,221		N/A
Labour win (new seat)				
Conservative win (new seat)				
Labour win (new seat)				

Burmantofts and Richmond Hill
Party	Candidate	Votes	%	±%
Labour	K. Cohen	3,471	65.4	N/A
Labour	M. Greene	3,308		
Labour	R. Millet	3,265		
Conservative	L. Dinnock	1,388	26.1	N/A
Conservative	E. Robbins	1,225		
Conservative	D. Tremlett	1,093		
National Front	E. Morrison	314	5.9	N/A
Communist	F. Stockdale	138	2.6	N/A
Majority		1,877	39.2	N/A
Turnout		5,311		N/A
Labour win (new seat)				
Labour win (new seat)				
Labour win (new seat)				

Chapel Allerton and Scott Hall
Party	Candidate	Votes	%	±%
Conservative	P. Sparling	3,640	63.4	N/A
Conservative	S. Symonds	3,608		
Conservative	C. Thomas	3,575		
Labour	G. Bloom	1,908	33.2	N/A
Labour	B. Selby	1,802		
Labour	A. Baum	1,759		
Communist	M. Tomplak	192	3.3	N/A
Majority		1,667	30.2	N/A
Turnout		5,740		N/A
Conservative win (new seat)				
Conservative win (new seat)				
Conservative win (new seat)				

City and Woodhouse
Party	Candidate	Votes	%	±%
Labour	W. Merritt	2,493	69.6	N/A
Labour	D. Jenner	2,301		
Labour	E. Morris	2,182		
Conservative	J. Lewis	1,091	30.4	N/A
Conservative	I. Dobkin	1,061		
Conservative	A. Tidbitts	1,039		
Majority		1,091	39.1	N/A
Turnout		3,584		N/A
Labour win (new seat)				
Labour win (new seat)				
Labour win (new seat)				

Cookridge and Weetwood
Party	Candidate	Votes	%	±%
Conservative	R. Hall	5,237	63.8	N/A
Conservative	L. Carter	5,225		
Conservative	K. Loudon	5,203		
Labour	J. Wright	2,339	28.5	N/A
Labour	J. Cartlidge	1,538		
Labour	I. Morrison	1,467		
Independent	I. Smalley	634	7.7	N/A
Independent	V. Smalley	355		N/A
Majority		2,864	35.3	N/A
Turnout		8,210		N/A
Conservative win (new seat)				
Conservative win (new seat)				
Conservative win (new seat)				

Garforth #27 (Garforth North and Barwick)
Party	Candidate	Votes	%	±%
Conservative	S. Hood	3,732	54.6	N/A
Conservative	R. Ives	3,648		
Conservative	K. Hedley	3,641		
Labour	H. Winfield	3,099	45.4	N/A
Labour	J. Ratchford	3,089		
Labour	E. Brownridge	3,016		
Majority		542	9.3	N/A
Turnout		6,831		N/A
Conservative win (new seat)				
Conservative win (new seat)				
Conservative win (new seat)				

Garforth #28 (Kippax and Swillington)
Party	Candidate	Votes	%	±%
Labour	A. Haines	3,333	63.8	N/A
Labour	F. Flatters	3,305		
Labour	G. Moake	2,998		
Conservative	C. Taylor	1,326	25.4	N/A
Conservative	J. King	1,267		
Conservative	M. Barratt	1,216		
Independent Labour	E. Wilson	564	10.8	N/A
Majority		1,672	38.4	N/A
Turnout		5,223		N/A
Labour win (new seat)				
Labour win (new seat)				
Labour win (new seat)				

Gipton and Whinmoor
Party	Candidate	Votes	%	±%
Labour	A. King	2,688	55.1	N/A
Labour	E. Coward	2,668		
Labour	A. Vollans	2,645		
Conservative	M. Suttenstall	1,607	32.9	N/A
Conservative	A. Westerman	1,604		
Conservative	W. Buckland	1,594		
Liberal	Kathleen Pedder	499	10.2	N/A
Liberal	P. Lawson	475		
Liberal	J. Nelson	444		
Communist	J. Bellamy	88	1.8	N/A
Majority		1,038	22.1	N/A
Turnout		4,882		N/A
Labour win (new seat)				
Labour win (new seat)				
Labour win (new seat)				

Halton
Party	Candidate	Votes	%	±%
Conservative	J. Dodgson	3,009	69.7	N/A
Conservative	W. Hyde	2,872		
Conservative	D. Wood	2,848		
Labour	G. Dickinson	1,305	30.3	N/A
Labour	J. Williams	1,214		
Labour	W. Banks	1,134		
Majority		1,543	39.5	N/A
Turnout		4,314		N/A
Conservative win (new seat)				
Conservative win (new seat)				
Conservative win (new seat)				

Harehills and Roundhay
Party	Candidate	Votes	%	±%
Conservative	P. Crotty	3,873	64.9	N/A
Conservative	J. Challenor	3,737		
Conservative	J. White	3,690		
Labour	K. Jeffrey	1,281	21.5	N/A
Labour	I. Naylor	1,256		
Labour	E. Kavanagh	1,240		
Liberal	C. Farrer	816	13.7	N/A
Liberal	S. Hannam	690		
Liberal	R. Morgan	659		
Majority		2,409	43.4	N/A
Turnout		5,970		N/A
Conservative win (new seat)				
Conservative win (new seat)				
Conservative win (new seat)				

Headingley
Party	Candidate	Votes	%	±%
Conservative	E. Clark	1,952	44.8	N/A
Conservative	T. Kirkby	1,931		
Conservative	P. Brown	1,918		
Labour	P. Fathers	1,502	34.4	N/A
Labour	J. Gunnell	1,473		
Labour	John Christopher Say	1,362		
Liberal	J. Coates	908	20.8	N/A
Liberal	M. Baker	818		
Liberal	E. Leigh	809		
Majority		416	10.3	N/A
Turnout		4,362		N/A
Conservative win (new seat)				
Conservative win (new seat)				
Conservative win (new seat)				

Horsforth
Party	Candidate	Votes	%	±%
Liberal	M. Crossfield	3,429	46.1	N/A
Liberal	R. Morrish	3,375		
Liberal	H. Stuttard	3,175		
Conservative	J. Fearnside	3,054	41.1	N/A
Conservative	H. Fairhirst	2,964		
Conservative	May Sexton	2,781		
Labour	A. Bloomer	956	12.9	N/A
Labour	H. Outhwaite	921		
Labour	M. Simmons	865		
Majority		121	5.0	N/A
Turnout		7,439		N/A
Liberal win (new seat)				
Liberal win (new seat)				
Liberal win (new seat)				

Hunslet East and West
Party	Candidate	Votes	%	±%
Liberal	Denis Pedder	3,296	55.8	N/A
Liberal	J. Barrie	3,038		
Liberal	David Austick	2,869		
Labour	G. Bowsley	2,208	37.4	N/A
Labour	W. Pepper	2,160		
Labour	J. Hodkinson	2,154		
Conservative	N. Griffiths	405	6.9	N/A
Conservative	W. Laidler	355		
Conservative	I. Shuttleworth	321		
Majority		661	18.4	N/A
Turnout		5,909		N/A
Liberal win (new seat)				
Liberal win (new seat)				
Liberal win (new seat)				

Kirkstall
Party	Candidate	Votes	%	±%
Labour	Elizabeth Nash	2,460	49.6	N/A
Labour	B. Atha	2,421		
Labour	K. Fenwick	2,410		
Conservative	A. Castle	2,337	47.1	N/A
Conservative	J. Kirkbright	2,203		
Communist	J. Sidebottom	167	3.4	N/A
Majority		73	2.5	N/A
Turnout		4,964		N/A
Labour win (new seat)				
Labour win (new seat)				
Labour win (new seat)				

Middleton
Party	Candidate	Votes	%	±%
Labour	J. Taylor	1,901	77.6	N/A
Labour	J. Kitchen	1,801		
Labour	G. Wood	1,788		
Conservative	R. Ivey	394	16.1	N/A
Conservative	P. Ingram	370		
Conservative	G. Lambert	365		
Communist	D. Priscott	154	6.3	N/A
Majority		1,394	61.5	N/A
Turnout		2,449		N/A
Labour win (new seat)				
Labour win (new seat)				
Labour win (new seat)				

Moortown
Party	Candidate	Votes	%	±%
Conservative	A. Redmond	2,155	66.0	N/A
Conservative	M. Davies	2,147		
Conservative	R. Challenor	2,134		
Labour	N. Jones	1,111	34.0	N/A
Labour	G. Shaftner	1,055		
Labour	L. Hirst	1,004		
Majority		1,023	32.0	N/A
Turnout		3,266		N/A
Conservative win (new seat)				
Conservative win (new seat)				
Conservative win (new seat)				

Morley #22 (Morley North)
Party	Candidate	Votes	%	±%
Conservative	B. Barker	3,024	54.9	N/A
Conservative	J. Binks	2,993		
Conservative	R. Verity	2,946		
Labour	M. Marshall	2,489	45.1	N/A
Labour	Michael McGowan	2,447		
Labour	P. Aspden	2,426		
Majority		457	9.7	N/A
Turnout		5,513		N/A
Conservative win (new seat)				
Conservative win (new seat)				
Conservative win (new seat)				

Morley #23 (Morley South)
Party	Candidate	Votes	%	±%
Labour	B. Haydn	2,702	63.9	N/A
Labour	E. Hewitt	2,665		
Labour	S. Welham	2,632		
Conservative	G. Gray	1,525	36.1	N/A
Conservative	C. Rover	1,473		
Conservative	P. Boden	1,433		
Majority		1,107	27.8	N/A
Turnout		4,227		N/A
Labour win (new seat)				
Labour win (new seat)				
Labour win (new seat)				

Osmondthorpe
Party	Candidate	Votes	%	±%
Labour	D. Gabb	1,817	69.3	N/A
Labour	D. Hamilton	1,770		
Labour	W. Pritchard	1,727		
Conservative	C. Suttenstall	805	30.7	N/A
Conservative	S. Tomlinson	765		
Conservative	V. Tyrell	740		
Majority		922	38.6	N/A
Turnout		2,622		N/A
Labour win (new seat)				
Labour win (new seat)				
Labour win (new seat)				

Otley
Party	Candidate	Votes	%	±%
Conservative	F. Atkinson	3,047	41.1	N/A
Liberal	G. Kirkland	2,981	40.2	N/A
Liberal	D. Whiteley	2,917		
Conservative	Eve Fowler	2,763		
Conservative	G. Francis	2,538		
Liberal	T. Flintoff	2,675		
Labour	F. Farnell	1,389	18.7	N/A
Labour	F. Longstaffe	1,296		
Labour	Doris Gagen	1,060		
Majority		154	0.9	N/A
Turnout		7,417		N/A
Conservative win (new seat)				
Liberal win (new seat)				
Liberal win (new seat)				

Pudsey #24 (Pudsey North)
Party	Candidate	Votes	%	±%
Conservative	A. Carter	2,556	34.3	N/A
Liberal	J. Finnegan	2,507	33.7	N/A
Conservative	C. Thompson	2,435		
Labour	S. Pearson	2,380	32.0	N/A
Labour	G. Bloomfield	2,370		
Conservative	J. Bashall	2,360		
Liberal	R. Hainsworth	2,294		
Labour	L. Rawson	2,292		
Liberal	C. Russell	2,022		
Majority		55	0.7	N/A
Turnout		7,443		N/A
Conservative win (new seat)				
Liberal win (new seat)				
Conservative win (new seat)				

Pudsey #25 (Pudsey South)
Party	Candidate	Votes	%	±%
Liberal	C. Wilson	2,760	38.8	N/A
Liberal	R. Fairbank	2,398		
Labour	J. Mann	2,303	32.4	N/A
Liberal	R. Leicester	2,229		
Labour	E. Simmons	2,052		
Conservative	P. Kersting	1,912	23.5	N/A
Labour	G. Wadwell	1,862		
Conservative	R. Hughes-Rowlands	1,670		
Conservative	D. Eastham	1,613		
Independent	E. Stockhill	374	5.3	N/A
Majority		74	6.4	N/A
Turnout		7,107		N/A
Liberal win (new seat)				
Liberal win (new seat)				
Labour win (new seat)				

Rothwell
Party	Candidate	Votes	%	±%
Labour	R. Lund	3,908	65.3	N/A
Labour	A. Benson	3,685		
Labour	J. De Carieret	3,560		
Conservative	W. Williams	2,078	34.7	N/A
Conservative	E. Linnington	1,858		
Conservative	Mrs M. Szewe	1,792		
Majority		1,482	30.6	N/A
Turnout		5,986		N/A
Labour win (new seat)				
Labour win (new seat)				
Labour win (new seat)				

Seacroft
Party	Candidate	Votes	%	±%
Labour	K. Woolmer	2,929	77.9	N/A
Labour	F. Stringer	2,904		
Labour	G. Mudie	2,838		
Conservative	V. Dodgson	674	17.9	N/A
Conservative	J. Suttenstall	636		
Conservative	C. Bond	626		
Communist	A. Dale	158	4.2	N/A
Majority		2,164	60.0	N/A
Turnout		3,761		N/A
Labour win (new seat)				
Labour win (new seat)				
Labour win (new seat)				

Stanningley
Party	Candidate	Votes	%	±%
Labour	A. Miller	1,955	54.3	N/A
Labour	K. Gould	1,952		
Labour	C. Myers	1,899		
Conservative	K. Knapton	1,022	28.4	N/A
Conservative	R. Benton	987		
Conservative	H. Stockwell	980		
Liberal	S. Clayforth	621	17.3	N/A
Liberal	K. Honnoraty	606		
Liberal	V. Hook	596		
Majority		877	25.9	N/A
Turnout		3,598		N/A
Labour win (new seat)				
Labour win (new seat)				
Labour win (new seat)				

Talbot
Party	Candidate	Votes	%	±%
Conservative	I. Bellow	2,812	60.0	N/A
Conservative	J. Sherwin	2,741		
Conservative	R. Feldman	2,731		
Liberal	M. Phillips	1,280	27.3	N/A
Liberal	B. Brill	1,227		
Liberal	R. Whitelock	1,141		
Labour	N. Holdsworth	591	12.6	N/A
Labour	C. Mack	573		
Labour	D. Knapp	564		
Majority		1,451	32.7	N/A
Turnout		4,683		N/A
Conservative win (new seat)				
Conservative win (new seat)				
Conservative win (new seat)				

Wetherby
Party	Candidate	Votes	%	±%
Conservative	D. Hudson	5,216	66.7	N/A
Conservative	N. Bown	5,158		
Conservative	J. Rolston	5,012		
Labour	J. Shackleton	1,850	23.7	N/A
Labour	R. Wilde	1,600		
Labour	C. Brown	1,500		
Independent	Gladys Musgrave	755	9.7	N/A
Majority		3,162	43.0	N/A
Turnout		7,821		N/A
Conservative win (new seat)				
Conservative win (new seat)				
Conservative win (new seat)				

Wortley
Party	Candidate	Votes	%	±%
Conservative	F. Stubley	2,030	42.2	N/A
Labour	W. Thurlow	2,008	41.7	N/A
Labour	A. Shires	1,899		
Conservative	C. Mathers	1,892		
Conservative	A. Woolman	1,869		
Labour	R. Cooke	1,756		
Liberal	D. Freethy	776	16.1	N/A
Liberal	I. Halliday	528		
Liberal	J. Crawshaw	522		
Majority		7	0.5	N/A
Turnout		4,814		N/A
Conservative win (new seat)				
Labour win (new seat)				
Labour win (new seat)				

== By-elections between 1973 and 1975 ==
Headingley by-election 28 February 1974
Party	Candidate	Votes	%	±%
Conservative	Alan Pedley	3,463	36.6	−8.2
Liberal	John Coates	3,135	33.1	+12.3
Labour	Irene Levy	2,864	30.3	−4.1
Majority		328	3.5	−6.8
Turnout		9,462	60.0	
Conservative hold		Swing	-10.2	

Burley by-election 21 November 1974
Party	Candidate	Votes	%	±%
Labour	C. Buttery	1,269	48.3	+8.9
Conservative	M. Sexton	909	34.6	−1.1
Liberal	J. Wright	396	15.1	−6.3
Communist	S. Walker	54	2.0	−1.5
Majority		360	13.7	+10.0
Turnout		2,628		
Labour gain from Conservative		Swing	+5.0	

Burley by-election 8 January 1975
Party	Candidate	Votes	%	±%
Labour	T. Donohoe	999	52.3	+12.9
Conservative	D. Ramsden	609	31.9	−3.8
Liberal	J. Wright	164	8.6	−12.8
National Front	J. Duckenfield	138	7.2	+7.2
Majority		360	20.4	+16.7
Turnout		1,910		
Labour hold		Swing	+8.3	
