= 1979 Leeds City Council election =

1979 UK local government election

Elections to Leeds City Council were held on the same day as the general election, with one third of the council up for election and an additional vacancy in Garforth North and Barwick. There had also been a by-election in Horsforth for the seat up in this election, with the Conservatives successfully defending it.

The general election brought out a much higher turnout, with votes cast just over double the average set by the prior elections. The Liberal's fuller slate of candidates for this election gained them a personal best, seemingly mainly at the Conservative's expense. Little advance was made from this, however, with their sole gain confined to winning the earlier mentioned Conservative-held Horsforth seat. Instead, Labour were the night's clear victors, with a total of five gains; four from the Conservatives (Burley, Kirkstall, and Morley North and Wortley) and Hunslet East and West from the Liberals.

This returned the council to no overall control, with one seat dividing the Conservatives and Labour.

== Election result ==
Leeds local election result 1979
Party	Seats	Gains	Losses	Net gain/loss	Seats %	Votes %	Votes	+/−
Labour	17	5	0	+5	51.5	41.2	160,075	+0.7%
Conservative	14	0	5	-5	42.4	38.5	149,646	-5.3%
Liberal	2	1	1	0	6.1	17.8	69,227	+5.6%
Ecology	0	0	0	0	0.0	1.5	6,064	+0.3%
National Front	0	0	0	0	0.0	0.4	1,720	-0.7%
Communist	0	0	0	0	0.0	0.3	1,186	-0.2%
Independent	0	0	0	0	0.0	0.2	753	-0.5%

This result has the following consequences for the total number of seats on the Council after the elections:

Party	Previous council	New council
Conservatives	50	45
Labour	39	44
Liberals	7	7
Total	96	96
Working majority	4	0

== Ward results ==
Aireborough
Party	Candidate	Votes	%	±%
Conservative	H. Freeman	7,973	43.6	−13.1
Liberal	J. Brown	5,832	31.9	+14.9
Labour	M. Dunn	4,198	22.9	−3.5
Ecology	K. Rushworth	301	1.6	+1.6
Majority		2,141	11.7	−18.5
Turnout		18,304		
Conservative hold		Swing	-14.0	

Armley and Castleton
Party	Candidate	Votes	%	±%
Liberal	B. Nelson	5,250	42.3	−2.7
Labour	J. Kerwin-Davey	4,678	37.7	+5.9
Conservative	W. Broadbent	2,267	18.3	−1.8
National Front	D. Bentall	141	1.1	−0.2
Communist	J. Light	80	0.6	−0.2
Majority		572	4.6	−8.6
Turnout		12,416		
Liberal hold		Swing	-4.3	

Beeston and Holbeck
Party	Candidate	Votes	%	±%
Labour	H. Booth	7,144	55.0	−6.7
Conservative	W. Birch	4,080	31.4	−4.6
Liberal	M. Day	1,633	12.6	+12.6
National Front	J. Duckenfield	140	1.1	−1.2
Majority		3,064	23.6	−2.1
Turnout		12,997		
Labour hold		Swing	-1.0	

Bramley
Party	Candidate	Votes	%	±%
Labour	E. Millett	4,648	43.7	−10.3
Liberal	D. Selby	3,889	36.5	+18.8
Conservative	V. Drummond-Young	2,108	19.8	−6.3
Majority		759	7.1	−20.7
Turnout		10,645		
Labour hold		Swing	-14.5	

Burley
Party	Candidate	Votes	%	±%
Labour	W. Kilgallon	3,100	51.5	−2.6
Conservative	M. Sexton	1,923	32.0	−7.1
Liberal	N. Flood	659	11.0	+11.0
Ecology	K. Baxter	242	4.0	+0.0
Communist	B. Jackson	93	1.5	−0.2
Majority		1,177	19.6	+4.5
Turnout		6,017		
Labour gain from Conservative		Swing	+2.2	

Burmantofts and Richmond Hill
Party	Candidate	Votes	%	±%
Labour	R. Millet	6,122	46.2	+10.9
Liberal	P. Hartshorne	5,051	38.1	−12.3
Conservative	D. Boynton	1,850	14.0	+2.4
National Front	S. Rigby	118	0.9	−0.6
Communist	M. Monkman	102	0.8	−0.3
Majority		1,071	8.1	−7.1
Turnout		13,243		
Labour hold		Swing	+11.6	

Chapel Allerton and Scott Hall
Party	Candidate	Votes	%	±%
Conservative	C. Thomas	6,761	44.7	−6.9
Labour	M. Taggart	5,911	39.1	+1.0
Liberal	R. Clay	1,938	12.8	+6.5
Ecology	C. Burrows	395	2.6	+1.9
Communist	L. Willoughby	121	0.8	−0.6
Majority		850	5.6	−7.9
Turnout		15,126		
Conservative hold		Swing	-3.9	

City and Woodhouse
Party	Candidate	Votes	%	±%
Labour	E. Morris	4,979	58.8	−5.5
Conservative	R. Simpson	2,207	26.0	−0.5
Liberal	A. Ali	677	8.0	+3.7
Ecology	S. Parkin	399	4.7	+4.7
Communist	J. Rodgers	211	2.5	−0.7
Majority		2,772	32.7	−5.0
Turnout		8,473		
Labour hold		Swing	-2.5	

Cookridge and Weetwood
Party	Candidate	Votes	%	±%
Conservative	K. Loudon	11,118	55.9	−8.5
Labour	M. Verity	4,796	24.1	+2.4
Liberal	D. Gazey	3,262	16.4	+4.6
Ecology	P. Lewenz	706	3.6	+1.5
Majority		6,322	31.8	−10.9
Turnout		19,882		
Conservative hold		Swing	-5.4	

Garforth North and Barwick
Party	Candidate	Votes	%	±%
Conservative	W. Hedley	7,352	53.2	−7.2
Conservative	A. Taylor	6,764		
Labour	E. Smith	5,285	38.3	+5.2
Labour	B. Cook	5,239		
Ecology	G. Hill	1,178	8.5	+2.0
Majority		2,067	15.0	−12.4
Turnout		13,815		
Conservative hold		Swing		
Conservative hold		Swing	-6.2	

Gipton and Whinmoor
Party	Candidate	Votes	%	±%
Labour	A. Vollans	9,573	59.1	−3.2
Conservative	W. Buckland	4,906	30.3	−4.2
Liberal	N. Mackie	1,467	9.1	+9.1
National Front	B. Spink	257	1.6	−0.4
Majority		4,667	28.8	+1.0
Turnout		16,203		
Labour hold		Swing	+0.5	

Halton
Party	Candidate	Votes	%	±%
Conservative	D. Wood	6,771	57.1	−13.0
Labour	L. Worth	3,622	30.5	+3.0
Liberal	K. Norman	1,472	12.4	+12.4
Majority		3,149	26.5	−16.0
Turnout		11,865		
Conservative hold		Swing	-8.0	

Harehills and Roundhay
Party	Candidate	Votes	%	±%
Conservative	J. White	7,047	47.2	−7.4
Labour	M. Lyons	5,563	37.3	+0.1
Liberal	D. Jones	1,612	10.8	+5.6
Ecology	A. Hill	473	3.2	+1.6
National Front	L. Spink	223	1.5	+0.1
Majority		1,484	9.9	−7.5
Turnout		14,918		
Conservative hold		Swing	-3.7	

Headingley
Party	Candidate	Votes	%	±%
Conservative	Jean Searle	3,914	36.6	−8.5
Labour	Mary Dalwood	3,786	35.4	+2.3
Liberal	David Rolfe	2,254	21.1	+7.1
Ecology	Claire Nash	467	4.4	+0.6
Communist	Barry Cooper	279	2.6	−1.6
Majority		128	1.2	−10.8
Turnout		10,700		
Conservative hold		Swing	-5.4	

Horsforth
Party	Candidate	Votes	%	±%
Liberal	R. Howe	5,625	45.8	+1.7
Conservative	M. Frame	4,511	36.8	−4.6
Labour	A. Radford	1,819	14.8	+3.7
Ecology	D. Darnborough	316	2.6	−0.8
Majority		1,114	9.1	+6.4
Turnout		12,271		
Liberal gain from Conservative		Swing	+3.1	

Hunslet East and West
Party	Candidate	Votes	%	±%
Labour	Trevor Park	6,166	56.1	+6.3
Liberal	P. Jones	2,902	26.4	+13.4
Conservative	C. Hudson	1,563	14.2	+3.2
National Front	N. Griffiths	243	2.2	−0.4
Communist	J. Hodgson	111	1.0	+1.0
Majority		3,264	29.7	+3.3
Turnout		10,985		
Labour gain from Liberal		Swing	-3.5	

Kippax and Swillington
Party	Candidate	Votes	%	±%
Labour	G. Moakes	6,453	60.2	+1.2
Conservative	R. Dawson	3,284	30.7	−10.3
Liberal	N. Parnaby	975	9.1	+9.1
Majority		3,169	29.6	+11.5
Turnout		10,712		
Labour hold		Swing	+5.7	

Kirkstall
Party	Candidate	Votes	%	±%
Labour	John Illingworth	4,822	52.6	−4.2
Conservative	John Hamilton	3,318	36.2	−3.0
Liberal	Laurence Keates	1,032	11.3	+11.3
Majority		1,504	16.4	−1.2
Turnout		9,172		
Labour gain from Conservative		Swing	-0.6	

Middleton
Party	Candidate	Votes	%	±%
Labour	G. Wood	6,797	70.0	−7.4
Conservative	A. Larvin	1,848	19.0	−0.3
Liberal	R. James	1,069	11.0	+11.0
Majority		4,949	50.9	−7.1
Turnout		9,714		
Labour hold		Swing	-3.5	

Moortown
Party	Candidate	Votes	%	±%
Conservative	R. Challenor	5,316	54.7	−8.2
Labour	T. Taylor	3,064	31.5	−2.2
Liberal	Dorothea Leser	1,133	11.7	+11.7
Ecology	A. Varley	209	2.1	−1.3
Majority		2,252	23.2	−6.0
Turnout		9,722		
Conservative hold		Swing	-3.0	

Morley North
Party	Candidate	Votes	%	±%
Labour	P. Jones	6,376	47.6	−1.7
Conservative	R. Verity	6,261	46.8	−4.0
Independent	B. Morris	753	5.6	+5.6
Majority		115	0.9	−0.5
Turnout		13,390		
Labour gain from Conservative		Swing	+1.1	

Morley South
Party	Candidate	Votes	%	±%
Labour	B. North	7,293	61.6	−0.7
Conservative	A. Grayson	4,538	38.4	+0.7
Majority		2,755	23.3	−1.4
Turnout		11,831		
Labour hold		Swing	-0.7	

Osmondthorpe
Party	Candidate	Votes	%	±%
Labour	W. Prichard	5,025	62.1	−4.6
Conservative	D. Schofield	1,983	24.5	−5.7
Liberal	P. Gilbert	966	11.9	+11.9
National Front	M. Spink	117	1.4	−1.7
Majority		3,042	37.6	+1.1
Turnout		8,091		
Labour hold		Swing	+0.5	

Otley
Party	Candidate	Votes	%	±%
Conservative	Stephen Day (MP)	5,139	43.8	−6.3
Liberal	H. Morgan	4,486	38.3	+1.2
Labour	W. Imeson	1,868	15.9	+3.7
Ecology	D. Corry	185	1.6	+1.6
Communist	A. Oddy	50	0.4	−0.3
Majority		653	5.6	−7.5
Turnout		11,728		
Conservative hold		Swing	-3.7	

Pudsey North
Party	Candidate	Votes	%	±%
Conservative	I. Favell	4,898	40.5	−18.7
Liberal	A. Booker	3,958	32.7	+19.8
Labour	P. Burrill	3,243	26.8	−1.1
Majority		940	7.8	−23.5
Turnout		12,099		
Conservative hold		Swing	-19.2	

Pudsey South
Party	Candidate	Votes	%	±%
Conservative	P. Kersting	4,541	40.4	−2.6
Liberal	N. Gadsby	4,386	39.0	+3.1
Labour	T. Watson	2,311	20.6	−0.5
Majority		155	1.4	−5.7
Turnout		11,238		
Conservative hold		Swing	-2.8	

Rothwell
Party	Candidate	Votes	%	±%
Labour	B. Walker	10,429	62.9	+0.5
Conservative	T. Crystal	6,140	37.1	+1.9
Majority		4,289	25.9	−1.4
Turnout		16,569		
Labour hold		Swing	-0.7	

Seacroft
Party	Candidate	Votes	%	±%
Labour	George Mudie (politician)	7,432	70.4	+0.1
Conservative	D. Townsley	2,812	26.6	−0.1
National Front	C. Cannon	169	1.6	−1.3
Communist	B. Wilson	139	1.3	+1.3
Majority		4,620	43.8	+0.2
Turnout		10,552		
Labour hold		Swing	+0.1	

Stanningley
Party	Candidate	Votes	%	±%
Labour	C. Myers	4,540	51.2	−9.0
Conservative	K. Knapton	2,396	27.0	−4.0
Liberal	B. Jacques	1,762	19.9	+12.8
National Front	M. Gibson	173	2.0	+0.3
Majority		2,144	24.2	−5.0
Turnout		8,871		
Labour hold		Swing	-2.5	

Talbot
Party	Candidate	Votes	%	±%
Conservative	R. Feldman	6,146	58.3	−11.0
Labour	T. Midwood	2,490	23.6	+3.7
Liberal	M. Phillips	1,443	13.7	+7.7
Ecology	A. Plummer	459	4.4	+0.6
Majority		3,656	34.7	−14.7
Turnout		10,538		
Conservative hold		Swing	-7.3	

Wetherby
Party	Candidate	Votes	%	±%
Conservative	H. Gardiner	10,826	67.5	−4.0
Labour	M. Moynihan	2,258	14.1	+1.4
Liberal	J. Scott	2,210	13.8	+5.3
Ecology	M. Sellers	734	4.6	−2.7
Majority		8,568	53.5	−5.3
Turnout		16,028		
Conservative hold		Swing	-2.7	

Wortley
Party	Candidate	Votes	%	±%
Labour	W. Thurlow	4,284	40.6	−3.9
Conservative	R. Robson	3,849	36.5	−7.2
Liberal	W. Moss	2,284	21.6	+11.9
National Front	A. Smith	139	1.3	−0.8
Majority		435	4.1	+3.3
Turnout		10,556		
Labour gain from Conservative		Swing	+1.6	
