= Kirkstall (ward) =

Electoral ward in Leeds, England

- Kirkstall highlighted within Leeds
- Population: 16,138 (2023 electorate)
- Metropolitan borough: City of Leeds
- Metropolitan county: West Yorkshire
- Region: Yorkshire and the Humber
- Country: England
- Sovereign state: United Kingdom
- UK Parliament: Leeds Central and Headingley
- Councillors: Joe Ingham (Green); Andy Rontree (Labour); Fiona Venner (Labour)

Kirkstall is an electoral ward of Leeds City Council in west Leeds, West Yorkshire, covering Burley, Hawksworth, Kirkstall and the south west corner of West Park. It contains three rail stations: Burley Park, Headingley and Kirkstall Forge.

== Councillors since 1973 ==
Election	Councillor	Councillor	Councillor
1973	Elizabeth Nash (Lab) (Note: Nash had been a Kirkstall ward councillor since 1972.)	Bernard Atha (Lab) (Note: Atha had previously represented City ward from 1957 to 1968, when he lost his bid to be re-elected to council for the new West Hunslet ward. He was then a councillor for Holbeck ward from 1969 until his election for Kirkstall ward in 1973.)	K. Fenwick (Lab)
1975	Elizabeth Nash (Lab)	Bernard Atha (Lab)	John Hamilton (Con)
1976	Elizabeth Nash (Lab)	Bernard Atha (Lab)	John Hamilton (Con)
1978	Elizabeth Nash (Lab)	Bernard Atha (Lab)	John Hamilton (Con) (Note: After losing his re-election bid for Kirkstall ward at the next election in 1979, Hamilton was later elected as a Weetwood ward councillor in 1980 and held the seat until 1990.)
1979	Elizabeth Nash (Lab)	Bernard Atha (Lab)	John Illingworth (Lab)
1980	Elizabeth Nash (Lab)	Bernard Atha (Lab)	John Illingworth (Lab)
1982	Elizabeth Nash (Lab)	Bernard Atha (Lab)	John Illingworth (Lab)
1983	Elizabeth Nash (Lab)	Bernard Atha (Lab)	John Illingworth (Lab)
1984	Elizabeth Nash (Lab)	Bernard Atha (Lab)	John Illingworth (Lab)
1986	Elizabeth Nash (Lab)	Bernard Atha (Lab)	John Illingworth (Lab)
1987	Elizabeth Nash (Lab) (Note: Nash did not stand at the next election in 1988. She later represented City and Holbeck ward (1989-2004), City and Hunslet (2004-2018) and Hunslet and Riverside (2018-2022).)	Bernard Atha (Lab)	John Illingworth (Lab)
1988	Elizabeth Minkin (Lab)	Bernard Atha (Lab)	John Illingworth (Lab)
1990	Elizabeth Minkin (Lab)	Bernard Atha (Lab)	John Illingworth (Lab)
1991	Elizabeth Minkin (Lab)	Bernard Atha OBE (Lab)	John Illingworth (Lab)
1992	Elizabeth Minkin (Lab)	Bernard Atha OBE (Lab)	John Illingworth (Lab)
1994	Elizabeth Minkin (Lab)	Bernard Atha OBE (Lab)	John Illingworth (Lab)
1995	Elizabeth Minkin (Lab)	Bernard Atha OBE (Lab)	John Illingworth (Lab)
1996	Elizabeth Minkin (Lab)	Bernard Atha OBE (Lab)	John Illingworth (Lab)
1998	Elizabeth Minkin (Lab)	Bernard Atha OBE (Lab)	John Illingworth (Lab)
1999	Elizabeth Minkin (Lab)	Bernard Atha OBE (Lab)	John Illingworth (Lab)
2000	Elizabeth Minkin (Lab)	Bernard Atha OBE (Lab)	John Illingworth (Lab)
2002	Elizabeth Minkin (Lab)	Bernard Atha OBE (Lab)	John Illingworth (Lab)
2003	Elizabeth Minkin (Lab)	Bernard Atha OBE (Lab)	John Illingworth (Lab)
2004	Elizabeth Minkin (Lab)	Bernard Atha OBE (Lab)	John Illingworth (Lab)
2006	Elizabeth Minkin (Lab)	Bernard Atha OBE (Lab)	John Illingworth (Lab)
2007	Elizabeth Minkin (Lab)	Bernard Atha OBE (Lab)	John Illingworth (Lab)
2008	Lucinda Yeadon (Lab)	Bernard Atha OBE (Lab)	John Illingworth (Lab)
2010	Lucinda Yeadon (Lab)	Bernard Atha OBE (Lab)	John Illingworth (Lab)
2011	Lucinda Yeadon (Lab)	Bernard Atha OBE (Lab)	John Illingworth (Lab)
2012	Lucinda Yeadon (Lab)	Bernard Atha OBE (Lab)	John Illingworth (Lab)
2014	Lucinda Yeadon (Lab)	Fiona Venner (Lab)	John Illingworth (Lab)
2015	Lucinda Yeadon (Lab)	Fiona Venner (Lab)	John Illingworth (Lab)
2016	Lucinda Yeadon (Lab)	Fiona Venner (Lab)	John Illingworth (Lab)
2018	Hannah Bithell (Lab)	Fiona Venner (Lab)	John Illingworth (Lab)
2019	Hannah Bithell (Lab)	Fiona Venner (Lab)	John Illingworth (Lab)
2021	Hannah Bithell (Lab)	Fiona Venner (Lab)	John Illingworth (Lab)
2022	Hannah Bithell (Lab)	Fiona Venner (Lab)	John Illingworth (Lab)
2023	Hannah Bithell (Lab)	Fiona Venner (Lab)	Andy Rontree (Lab)
2024	Hannah Bithell (Lab)	Fiona Venner (Lab)	Andy Rontree (Lab)
2026	Joe Ingham* (GPEW)	Fiona Venner* (Lab)	Andy Rontree* (Lab)

indicates seat up for re-election. * indicates incumbent councillor.

== Elections since 2010 ==
=== May 2026 ===
2026
Party	Candidate	Votes	%	±%
Green	Joe Ingham	2,922	45.2	▲24.7
Labour	Hannah Bithell*	1,958	30.3	▼32.0
Reform	Jacob Holmes	946	14.6	N/A
Conservative	Dawn Collins	240	3.7	▼2.1
Independent	Stuart Long	211	3.3	▼0.4
Liberal Democrats	Chris Read	178	2.8	▼2.4
TUSC	George Phillips	16	0.2	▼2.3
Majority		964	14.9	▼26.9
Turnout		6,471	41.4	▲6.3
Green gain from Labour		Swing		

=== May 2024 ===
2024
Party	Candidate	Votes	%	±%
Labour	Fiona Venner*	3,451	62.3	−1.7
Green	Victoria Smith	1,137	20.5	+1.7
Conservative	Lyall Ainscow	321	5.8	−2.7
Liberal Democrats	Adam Belcher	288	5.2	−0.9
Independent	Stuart Long	204	3.7	+1.7
TUSC	John Tival	138	2.5	New
Majority		2,314	41.8	−3.4
Turnout		5,586	35.1	+5.9
Labour hold		Swing	-1.7	

=== May 2023 ===
2023
Party	Candidate	Votes	%	±%
Labour	Andy Rontree	3,018	64.0	−3.1
Green	Victoria Smith	886	18.8	+2.8
Conservative	Reiss Capitano	402	8.5	−1.7
Liberal Democrats	Adam Belcher	288	6.1	+0.3
Independent	Stuart Long	95	2.0	N/A
Majority		2,132	42.2	−8.9
Turnout		4,718	29.2	−1.6
Labour hold		Swing		

=== May 2022 ===
2022
Party	Candidate	Votes	%	±%
Labour	Hannah Bithell*	3,346	67.1	0.0
Green	Victoria Smith	797	16.0	+1.5
Conservative	Reiss Capitano	511	10.2	−3.0
Liberal Democrats	Adam Belcher	287	5.8	+2.6
Majority		2,549	51.1	−1.5
Turnout		4,986	30.8	−4.3
Labour hold		Swing		

=== May 2021 ===
2021
Party	Candidate	Votes	%	±%
Labour	Fiona Venner*	3,922	67.1	+4.6
Green	Victoria Smith	845	14.5	+0.1
Conservative	Reiss Capitano	773	13.2	+7.2
Liberal Democrats	Thomas Edwards	186	3.2	−3.4
TUSC	James Ellis	72	1.2	N/A
Majority		3,077	52.6	+4.5
Turnout		5,845	35.1	+4.4
Labour hold		Swing		

=== May 2019 ===
2019
Party	Candidate	Votes	%	±%
Labour	John Illingworth*	2,959	62.5	−3.3
Green	Victoria Smith	682	14.4	−1.8
UKIP	David Barlow	497	10.5	+10.5
Liberal Democrats	Edward Anthony Richardson	312	6.6	−0.7
Conservative	Liam Michael Kenrick-Bailey	283	6.0	−4.7
Majority		2,277	48.1	−8.1
Turnout		4,753	30.7	−1.5
Labour hold		Swing	-0.8	

=== May 2018 ===
2018
Party	Candidate	Votes	%	±%
Labour	Hannah Bithell	3,977	65.8	−2.7
Labour	Fiona Venner*	3,850		
Labour	John Illingworth*	3,634		
Green	Ben Goldthorp	978	16.2	+7.9
Conservative	Liam Kenrick-Bailey	645	10.7	+4.5
Conservative	Amaad Amin	471		
Conservative	Eleni Nicolaou	454		
Liberal Democrats	Maria Frank	445	7.3	+3.1
Majority		2,999	56.2	−1.4
Turnout		5,341	32.2	−2.3
Labour hold		Swing		
Labour hold		Swing		
Labour hold		Swing		

=== May 2016 ===
2016
Party	Candidate	Votes	%	±%
Labour	Lucinda Yeadon*	3,453	68.5	+16.8
UKIP	Cain Arron Weber	547	10.9	+0.3
Green	Morgan Rhys Tatchell-Evans	420	8.3	−10.0
Conservative	George William Andrew Rear	313	6.2	−6.1
Liberal Democrats	Martin Gareth Hughes	212	4.2	−1.5
Independent	Stuart William Long	53	1.1	+1.1
TUSC	Maddy Steeds	43	0.9	−0.5
Majority		5,040	57.6	+24.2
Turnout		5041	34.5	
Labour hold		Swing		

=== May 2015 ===
2015
Party	Candidate	Votes	%	±%
Labour	John Illingworth*	4,957	51.7	−12.8
Green	Meadow Hudson	1,755	18.3	+8.9
Conservative	Matthew Wharton	1,184	12.3	+0.2
UKIP	Paul Denner	1,017	10.6	+10.6
Liberal Democrats	Johathan Heap	548	5.7	−5.6
TUSC	Dean Meehan	133	1.4	+1.4
Majority		3,202	33.4	−19.0
Turnout		9,594	61.6	
Labour hold		Swing	10.9	

=== May 2014 ===
2014
Party	Candidate	Votes	%	±%
Labour	Fiona Venner	2,696		
UKIP	Kevin Reid	907		
Green	Morgan Tatchell-Evans	724		
Conservative	Matthew Wharton	379		
Liberal Democrats	Martin Hughes	252		
TUSC	Ben Mayor	56		
Independent	Stuart Long	55		
Majority				
Turnout			33.77	
Labour hold		Swing		

=== May 2012 ===
2012
Party	Candidate	Votes	%	±%
Labour	Lucinda Yeadon*	3,006	67.7	+3.2
Green	Morgan Tatchell-Evans	437	9.8	+0.5
Conservative	Annabel Gooch	398	9.0	−3.1
Liberal Democrats	Tom Mead	293	6.6	−4.7
Independent	Stuart Long	173	3.9	+1.1
Alliance for Green Socialism	Simon Fearn	136	3.1	+3.1
Majority		2,569	57.8	+5.4
Turnout		4,443		
Labour hold		Swing	+1.3	

=== May 2011 ===
2011
Party	Candidate	Votes	%	±%
Labour	John Illingworth*	3,634	64.5	+22.1
Conservative	Daniel Whitehouse	680	12.1	−2.9
Liberal Democrats	Chris Lovell	636	11.3	−21.7
Green	Morgan Tatchell-Evans	527	9.4	+4.4
Independent	Stuart Long	157	2.8	+2.8
Majority		2,954	52.4	+43.0
Turnout		5,634	35	
Labour hold		Swing	+12.5	

=== May 2010 ===
2010
Party	Candidate	Votes	%	±%
Labour	Bernard Atha*	4,012	42.4	+3.0
Liberal Democrats	Ruth Coleman	3,125	33.0	−3.6
Conservative	Matthew Wharton	1,420	15.0	+5.2
Green	Morgan Tatchell-Evans	469	5.0	−1.7
BNP	Keven Nicholson	447	4.7	−2.8
Majority		887	9.4	+6.7
Turnout		9,473	60.0	+29.9
Labour hold		Swing	+3.3	

== See also ==
- Listed buildings in Leeds (Kirkstall Ward)
