= 1968 Leeds City Council election =

1968 English local government election

The 1968 Leeds municipal election was held on 9 May 1968. Following extensive boundary changes, the whole council was up for election. The re-warding increased the number of wards by two, up to 32 wards, raising in-turn the councillor total by six, to 90, and the aldermen total up two to 30.

In total ten wards were abolished, twelve created and eighteen remained.

Abolished:

- Allerton
- Blenheim
- Cross Gates
- Far Headingley
- Hunslet Carr
- Hyde Park
- Meanwood
- Potternewton
- Wellington
- Westfield

Created:

- Burley
- Castleton
- Chapel Allerton
- Cookridge
- Gipton
- Headingley
- Scott Hall
- Seacroft
- Talbot
- Weetwood
- West Hunslet
- Whinmoor

The election followed national patterns of the Conservatives inflicting resounding defeats upon the Labour party, winning representation in all but five wards with a crushing 75 seats at the hand of their highest vote since 1951 and a record vote share. Labour representation was confined to City, East Hunslet, Holbeck and Middleton (although coming within a straw for the third seat in Whinmoor) as they picked up their lowest post-war vote and vote share. The Labour collapse also seen the smaller party make gains, as the Liberals won representation on the council for the first time in the post-war period via comfortably winning the three newly created Castleton seats and the Communists, who fielded a full-slate for the first and only time, more than tripled their previous records in both vote share and vote figure.

As a result, the Conservatives gained control of the council for the first time since 1952, with a whopping majority of 80.

== Election result ==
Leeds local election result 1968
Party	Seats	Gains	Losses	Net gain/loss	Seats %	Votes %	Votes	+/−
Conservative	75	0	0	0	83.3	61.3	77,221	N/A
Labour	12	0	0	0	13.3	27.9	35,200	N/A
Liberal	3	0	0	0	3.3	4.5	5,672	N/A
Communist	0	0	0	0	0.0	6.1	7,664	N/A
Independent Labour	0	0	0	0	0.0	0.1	176	N/A
National Front	0	0	0	0	0.0	0.1	115	N/A

The result had the following consequences for the total number of seats on the Council after the elections:

Party	Previous council		New council	
Party	Cllr	Ald	Cllr	Ald
Conservatives	43	9	75	25
Labour	41	19	12	5
Liberals	0	0	3	0
Total	84	28	90	30
Total	112		120	
Working majority	2	-10	60	20
Working majority	-8		80	

== Ward results ==
Armley
Party	Candidate	Votes	%	±%
Conservative	B. Stockwell	2,767	54.3	N/A
Conservative	H. Stephenson	2,765		
Conservative	G. Atkinson	2,711		
Labour	J. Bissell	1,879	36.9	N/A
Labour	K. Cohen	1,859		
Labour	S. Lee	1,656		
Communist	P. Wilton	451	8.8	N/A
Majority		832	17.4	N/A
Turnout		5,097		N/A
Conservative win (new seat)				
Conservative win (new seat)				
Conservative win (new seat)				

Beeston
Party	Candidate	Votes	%	±%
Conservative	J. Farrell	3,208	66.3	N/A
Conservative	L. Snape	3,196		
Conservative	A. Hartley	3,180		
Labour	F. Beevers	1,455	30.1	N/A
Labour	Harold Watson	1,276		
Labour	G. Wood	1,257		
Communist	E. Moore	172	3.6	N/A
Majority		1,725	36.3	N/A
Turnout		4,835		N/A
Conservative win (new seat)				
Conservative win (new seat)				
Conservative win (new seat)				

Bramley
Party	Candidate	Votes	%	±%
Conservative	J. Hart	2,892	57.2	N/A
Conservative	D. Armitage	2,730		
Conservative	M. Robinson	2,697		
Labour	Eric Atkinson	1,782	35.2	N/A
Labour	M. Chadwick	1,537		
Labour	E. Donohoe	1,306		
Communist	C. Moore	383	7.6	N/A
Majority		915	22.0	N/A
Turnout		5,057		N/A
Conservative win (new seat)				
Conservative win (new seat)				
Conservative win (new seat)				

Burley
Party	Candidate	Votes	%	±%
Conservative	P. Brown	2,318	61.9	N/A
Conservative	M. Davies	2,284		
Conservative	D. Ramsden	2,256		
Labour	V. Whelan	1,197	32.0	N/A
Labour	H. Waterman	1,170		
Labour	K. Beaumont	1,136		
Communist	T. Flynn	230	6.1	N/A
Majority		1,059	29.9	N/A
Turnout		3,745		N/A
Conservative win (new seat)				
Conservative win (new seat)				
Conservative win (new seat)				

Burmantofts
Party	Candidate	Votes	%	±%
Conservative	H. Flockton	2,206	49.8	N/A
Conservative	M. Baker	2,064		
Conservative	Christine Thomas	2,026		
Labour	Doreen Jenner	1,906	43.0	N/A
Labour	J. Moynihan	1,683		
Labour	J. Klineberg	1,664		
Communist	F. Stockdale	322	7.3	N/A
Majority		120	6.8	N/A
Turnout		4,434		N/A
Conservative win (new seat)				
Conservative win (new seat)				
Conservative win (new seat)				

Castleton
Party	Candidate	Votes	%	±%
Liberal	M. Renard	1,634	45.6	N/A
Liberal	Michael Meadowcroft	1,383		
Liberal	C. Tucker	1,305		
Labour	N. Barrett	932	26.0	N/A
Labour	J. Underwood	929		
Labour	A. Donohoe	928		
Conservative	C. Mathers	787	22.0	N/A
Conservative	B. Pearce	693		
Conservative	M. Thresh	640		
Communist	J. Garscadden	231	6.4	N/A
Majority		373	19.6	N/A
Turnout		3,584		N/A
Liberal win (new seat)				
Liberal win (new seat)				
Liberal win (new seat)				

Chapel Allerton
Party	Candidate	Votes	%	±%
Conservative	L. Bellow	4,163	85.2	N/A
Conservative	J. Long	4,063		
Conservative	Sydney Symmonds	3,927		
Labour	L. Hammond	544	11.1	N/A
Labour	J. Moran	307		
Labour	C. Say	277		
Communist	L. Morris	182	3.7	N/A
Majority		3,383	73.9	N/A
Turnout		4,889		N/A
Conservative win (new seat)				
Conservative win (new seat)				
Conservative win (new seat)				

City
Party	Candidate	Votes	%	±%
Labour	W. Merritt	1,494	48.8	N/A
Labour	Ernest Morris	1,432		
Labour	J. Wallbanks	1,400		
Conservative	A. Hislop	1,364	44.5	N/A
Conservative	J. Cumberland	1,352		
Conservative	J. Baines	1,303		
Communist	T. Johnson	204	6.7	N/A
Majority		36	4.2	N/A
Turnout		3,062		N/A
Labour win (new seat)				
Labour win (new seat)				
Labour win (new seat)				

Cookridge
Party	Candidate	Votes	%	±%
Conservative	Keith Loudon	3,721	73.6	N/A
Conservative	J. Lund	3,696		
Conservative	D. Jenkins	3,689		
Liberal	J. Davies	628	12.4	N/A
Liberal	D. Shearing	552		
Liberal	B. Williams	535		
Labour	J. McMurray	503	10.0	N/A
Labour	J. Roche	469		
Labour	H. Bretherick	429		
Communist	M. Monkman	202	4.0	N/A
Majority		3,061	61.2	N/A
Turnout		5,054		N/A
Conservative win (new seat)				
Conservative win (new seat)				
Conservative win (new seat)				

East Hunslet
Party	Candidate	Votes	%	±%
Labour	E. Haughton	1,592	62.0	N/A
Labour	W. Pepper	1,526		
Labour	W. Parker	1,516		
Conservative	I. Holmes	770	30.0	N/A
Conservative	E. Feather	743		
Conservative	M. Howdill	629		
Communist	D. Priscott	204	8.0	N/A
Majority		746	32.0	N/A
Turnout		2,566		N/A
Labour win (new seat)				
Labour win (new seat)				
Labour win (new seat)				

Gipton
Party	Candidate	Votes	%	±%
Conservative	A. Wood	2,375	55.4	N/A
Conservative	W. Buckland	2,368		
Conservative	M. Suttenstall	2,317		
Labour	F. Watson	1,633	38.1	N/A
Labour	D. Thomas	1,545		
Labour	J. Anson	1,442		
Communist	S. Jones	278	6.5	N/A
Majority		684	17.3	N/A
Turnout		4,286		N/A
Conservative win (new seat)				
Conservative win (new seat)				
Conservative win (new seat)				

Halton
Party	Candidate	Votes	%	±%
Conservative	S. Tomlinson	4,537	81.6	N/A
Conservative	R. Vaughan	4,534		
Conservative	Martin Dodgson	4,464		
Labour	W. Spence	654	11.8	N/A
Labour	Arthur Brown	506		
Labour	B. Shearay	473		
Communist	M. Johnson	372	6.7	N/A
Majority		3,810	69.8	N/A
Turnout		5,563		N/A
Conservative win (new seat)				
Conservative win (new seat)				
Conservative win (new seat)				

Harehills
Party	Candidate	Votes	%	±%
Conservative	Patrick Crotty	2,388	79.8	N/A
Conservative	J. White	2,377		
Conservative	J. Astle	2,357		
Labour	D. Wilson	395	13.2	N/A
Labour	O. Winship	340		
Labour	W. Veritty	235		
Communist	M. Tomplak	209	7.0	N/A
Majority		1,962	66.6	N/A
Turnout		2,992		N/A
Conservative win (new seat)				
Conservative win (new seat)				
Conservative win (new seat)				

Headingley
Party	Candidate	Votes	%	±%
Conservative	P. Godwin	3,749	71.7	N/A
Conservative	T. Bennett	3,690		
Conservative	T. Kirkby	3,657		
Liberal	J. Gibson	658	12.6	N/A
Labour	D. Jennings	563	10.8	N/A
Labour	J. McPheat	496		
Labour	Albert Smith	474		
Liberal	W. Trickett	458		
Liberal	A. Wren	424		
Communist	S. Walker	260	5.0	N/A
Majority		2,999	59.1	N/A
Turnout		5,230		N/A
Conservative win (new seat)				
Conservative win (new seat)				
Conservative win (new seat)				

Holbeck
Party	Candidate	Votes	%	±%
Labour	A. Beevers	1,548	54.9	N/A
Labour	W. Jones	1,476		
Labour	T. Smith	1,431		
Conservative	J. Bateman	984	34.9	N/A
Conservative	B. Rawson	951		
Conservative	A. Cummings	943		
Communist	E. Burwin	286	10.1	N/A
Majority		447	20.0	N/A
Turnout		2,818		N/A
Labour win (new seat)				
Labour win (new seat)				
Labour win (new seat)				

Kirkstall
Party	Candidate	Votes	%	±%
Conservative	T. Beevers	3,532	61.5	N/A
Conservative	R. Robertson	3,394		
Conservative	J. Horrocks	3,380		
Labour	D. Matthews	1,898	33.0	N/A
Labour	C. Collings	1,815		
Labour	Joyce Gould	1,814		
Communist	J. McDermott	317	5.5	N/A
Majority		1,482	28.4	N/A
Turnout		5,747		N/A
Conservative win (new seat)				
Conservative win (new seat)				
Conservative win (new seat)				

Middleton
Party	Candidate	Votes	%	±%
Labour	J. Taylor	1,604	55.4	N/A
Labour	S. Binns	1,521		
Labour	A. Malcolm	1,446		
Conservative	B. Cresswell	969	33.5	N/A
Conservative	J. Challenor	964		
Conservative	J. Johnson	885		
Communist	D. Priscott	320	11.1	N/A
Majority		477	21.9	N/A
Turnout		2,893		N/A
Labour win (new seat)				
Labour win (new seat)				
Labour win (new seat)				

Moortown
Party	Candidate	Votes	%	±%
Conservative	R. Challenor	3,488	74.5	N/A
Conservative	Kenneth Davison	3,444		
Conservative	A. Redmond	3,414		
Liberal	E. Nevies	543	11.6	N/A
Liberal	C. Rowlands	492		
Labour	B. Foxard	468	10.0	N/A
Liberal	Deryck Ernest Senior	464		
Labour	C. Green	384		
Labour	J. Hodkinson	337		
Communist	T. Kelly	180	3.8	N/A
Majority		2,871	62.9	N/A
Turnout		4,679		N/A
Conservative win (new seat)				
Conservative win (new seat)				
Conservative win (new seat)				

Osmondthorpe
Party	Candidate	Votes	%	±%
Conservative	F. Brown	1,694	46.2	N/A
Conservative	Doreen Wood	1,610		
Conservative	P. Lee	1,592		
Labour	Douglas Gabb	1,586	43.3	N/A
Labour	P. Addlestone	1,543		
Labour	W. Prichard	1,487		
Communist	W. Rumbelow	385	10.5	N/A
Majority		6	2.9	N/A
Turnout		3,665		N/A
Conservative win (new seat)				
Conservative win (new seat)				
Conservative win (new seat)				

Richmond Hill
Party	Candidate	Votes	%	±%
Conservative	S. Gill	2,024	55.2	N/A
Conservative	D. Eastham	1,973		
Conservative	H. Levery	1,962		
Labour	J. Mathers	1,350	36.8	N/A
Labour	Stan Cohen	1,336		
Labour	M. Fish	1,288		
Communist	P. Fawcett	295	8.0	N/A
Majority		612	18.4	N/A
Turnout		3,669		N/A
Conservative win (new seat)				
Conservative win (new seat)				
Conservative win (new seat)				

Roundhay
Party	Candidate	Votes	%	±%
Conservative	G. Lax	4,067	87.8	N/A
Conservative	D. Wolstenholme	4,058		
Conservative	A. Johnson	3,927		
Labour	R. Gillinson	333	7.2	N/A
Labour	M. Brett	331		
Labour	E. Kavanagh	287		
Communist	C. MacRae	234	5.0	N/A
Majority		3,594	80.6	N/A
Turnout		4,634		N/A
Conservative win (new seat)				
Conservative win (new seat)				
Conservative win (new seat)				

Scott Hall
Party	Candidate	Votes	%	±%
Conservative	D. Altman	1,435	50.7	N/A
Conservative	J. Kruthhoffer	1,409		
Conservative	V. Darnton	1,384		
Labour	G. Gloom	927	32.8	N/A
Labour	R. Ellis	909		
Labour	R. Sedler	845		
Liberal	Dennis Pedder	281	9.9	N/A
Liberal	Albert Ingham	255		
Liberal	R. Whitelock	221		
Communist	A. Dale	185	6.5	N/A
Majority		457	18.0	N/A
Turnout		2,828		N/A
Conservative win (new seat)				
Conservative win (new seat)				
Conservative win (new seat)				

Seacroft
Party	Candidate	Votes	%	±%
Conservative	D. Ball	1,823	46.6	N/A
Conservative	M. Freegard	1,774		
Conservative	E. McQuire	1,763		
Labour	F. Booth	1,731	44.2	N/A
Labour	L. Jackson	1,691		
Labour	E. Coward	1,608		
Communist	H. Besser	359	9.2	N/A
Majority		32	2.4	N/A
Turnout		3,913		N/A
Conservative win (new seat)				
Conservative win (new seat)				
Conservative win (new seat)				

Stanningley
Party	Candidate	Votes	%	±%
Conservative	K. Knapton	2,224	46.5	N/A
Conservative	A. Vickers	2,207		
Conservative	I. Benton	2,039		
Labour	Kevin Gould	1,851	38.7	N/A
Labour	F. Davis	1,795		
Labour	Arthur Vollans	1,697		
Liberal	F. Robertson	487	10.2	N/A
Liberal	A. Fleet	478		
Liberal	J. Lavery	458		
Communist	F. Sidebottom	220	4.6	N/A
Majority		188	7.8	N/A
Turnout		4,782		N/A
Conservative win (new seat)				
Conservative win (new seat)				
Conservative win (new seat)				

Talbot
Party	Candidate	Votes	%	±%
Conservative	L. Bidgood	4,249	87.1	N/A
Conservative	D. Bradley	4,187		
Conservative	P. Brayshay	4,181		
Labour	P. King	469	9.6	N/A
Labour	Joshua Walsh	451		
Labour	M. Rooney	418		
Communist	R. Dolan	163	3.3	N/A
Majority		3,712	77.4	N/A
Turnout		4,881		N/A
Conservative win (new seat)				
Conservative win (new seat)				
Conservative win (new seat)				

Weetwood
Party	Candidate	Votes	%	±%
Conservative	R. Hall	4,551	76.3	N/A
Conservative	F. Hall	4,459		
Conservative	G. Somers	4,432		
Liberal	W. Beaumont	896	15.0	N/A
Liberal	David Austwick	858		
Liberal	J. Grant	823		
Labour	S. Hand	231	3.9	N/A
Labour	R. Pullan	203		
Labour	V. Veritty	201		
Communist	M. Kettle	174	2.9	N/A
National Front	P. Stone	115	1.9	N/A
Majority		3,536	61.3	N/A
Turnout		5,967		N/A
Conservative win (new seat)				
Conservative win (new seat)				
Conservative win (new seat)				

West Hunslet
Party	Candidate	Votes	%	±%
Conservative	P. Bennett	1,766	55.8	N/A
Conservative	K. Crosby	1,741		
Conservative	W. Waddington	1,736		
Labour	A. Tallant	1,122	35.5	N/A
Labour	Bernard Atha	1,105		
Labour	Harry Booth	1,094		
Independent Labour	A. Betts	176	5.6	N/A
Independent Labour	M. Wilson	129		
Independent Labour	D. Kennally	127		
Communist	J. McCarthy	99	3.1	N/A
Majority		614	20.4	N/A
Turnout		3,163		N/A
Conservative win (new seat)				
Conservative win (new seat)				
Conservative win (new seat)				

Whinmoor
Party	Candidate	Votes	%	±%
Conservative	P. Clokie	1,479	48.9	N/A
Conservative	V. McNair	1,427		
Conservative	Peggy White	1,348		
Labour	M. Lawrence	1,348	44.5	N/A
Labour	J. Clore	1,345		
Labour	Jim Marshall	1,212		
Communist	J. Scawthorn	199	6.6	N/A
Majority		0	4.3	N/A
Turnout		3,026		N/A
Conservative win (new seat)				
Conservative win (new seat)				
Conservative win (new seat)				

Woodhouse
Party	Candidate	Votes	%	±%
Conservative	A. Sexton	2,484	62.4	N/A
Conservative	May Sexton	2,458		
Conservative	P. Fingret	2,365		
Labour	P. Taylor	1,121	28.2	N/A
Labour	V. Zermansky	966		
Labour	A. Baum	961		
Communist	M. Moore	377	9.5	N/A
Majority		1,244	34.2	N/A
Turnout		3,982		N/A
Conservative win (new seat)				
Conservative win (new seat)				
Conservative win (new seat)				

Wortley
Party	Candidate	Votes	%	±%
Conservative	R. Treeman	3,207	64.1	N/A
Conservative	R. Beal	3,115		
Conservative	F. Stubley	3,114		
Labour	W. Thurlow	1,084	21.6	N/A
Labour	T. Cooke	1,012		
Labour	W. Window	962		
Liberal	J. Saxton	545	10.9	N/A
Liberal	Walter Holdsworth	464		
Liberal	J. Crawshaw	452		
Communist	G. McGowan	171	3.4	N/A
Majority		20,30	42.4	N/A
Turnout		5,007		N/A
Conservative win (new seat)				
Conservative win (new seat)				
Conservative win (new seat)				
