= Weetwood =

Suburb of Leeds in West Yorkshire, England

Coordinates: 53.839°N 1.588°W

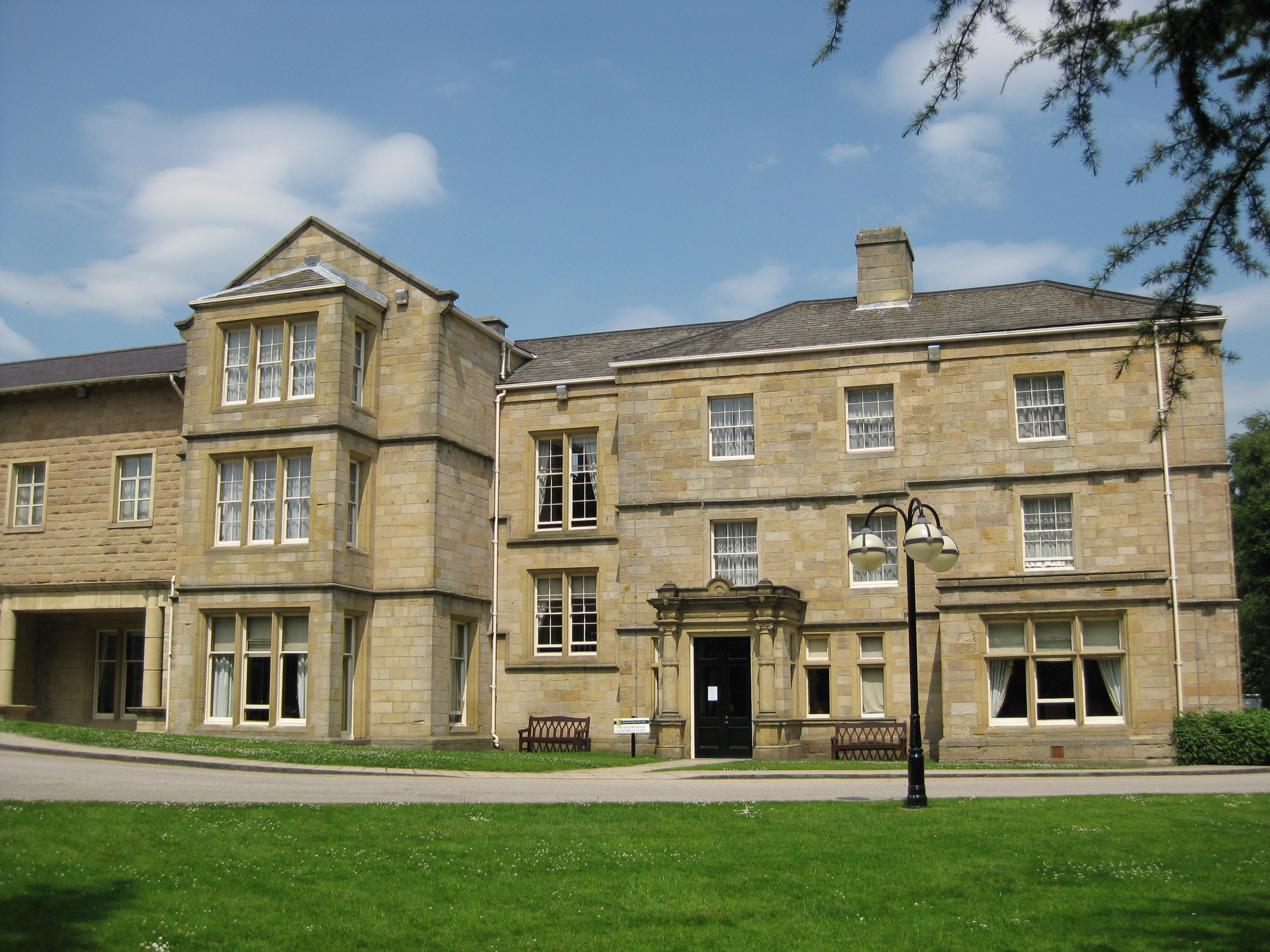
Weetwood Hall: Manor house on the right

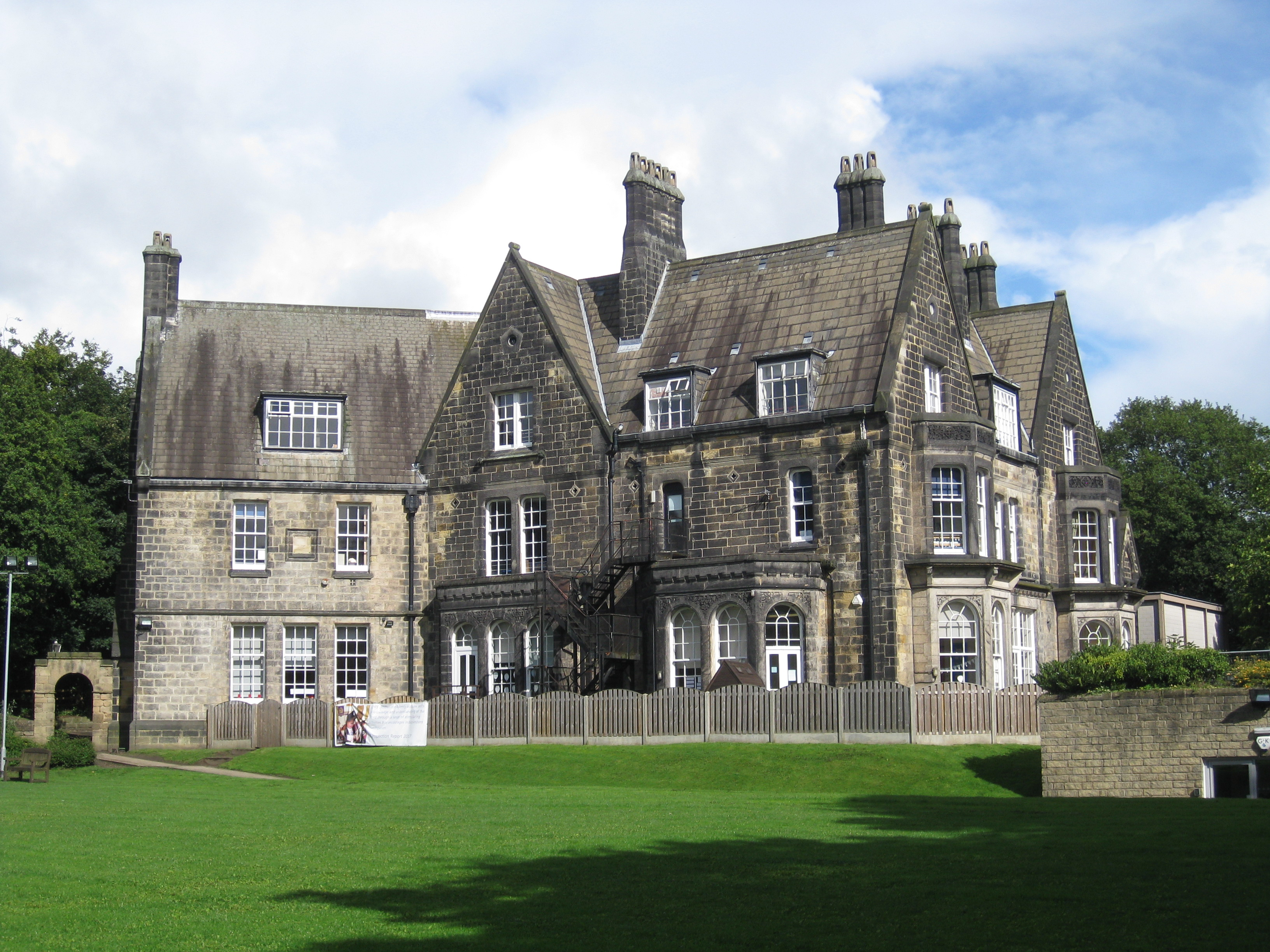
Fox Hill: now Moorlands School

Weetwood is an area between Headingley and Meanwood in north-west Leeds, West Yorkshire, England. It is bounded on the north by the A6120 (Outer Ring Road), on the west by the A660 (Otley Road), on the east by Meanwood Beck and to the south by Hollin Lane. Weetwood Lane runs north and south through it.

The area lends its name to and sits in the Weetwood ward of Leeds City Council, which is also part of Leeds Central and Headingley parliamentary constituency.

== Politics ==
The Weetwood ward, for local government purposes, includes the areas known as Far Headingley (south of the above), West Park (west of the A660), Ireland Wood (north of the A6120), and Tinshill. Its three Leeds City Councillors and the terms for which they are currently elected, are Izaak Wilson (Labour Party, 2022–2026), Jools Heselwood (Labour Party, 2023–2027) and Emma Flint (Labour Party, 2024–2028). The population of this ward was 22,375 at the 2011 Census.

Weetwood is part of the Leeds Central and Headingley parliamentary constituency, and its MP is Alex Sobel (Labour Party).

== History ==
The name (earlier Wetewode) means the wet wood to the west of Meanwood Beck. The main activities of the area were quarrying the sandstone which underlies it and charcoal burning and later iron smelting in bloomery furnaces which occurred from 1240 to 1550. For most of this time the land was owned by Kirkstall monastery. Following the dissolution of the monasteries, the area went into private hands, notably the Foxcroft family who held it from 1583 until 1741, building a manor house, Weetwood Hall in 1625. The Meanwood Beck provided power for Weetwood mill and Walley's tannery from 1656 to 1820. In the Middle Ages Weetwood Lane was the principal route between Adel and Leeds, and particularly to the market in Headingley. The construction of the Leeds to Otley Turnpike (now the A660 Otley Road) in 1741 provided a faster link so that residences began to be built, particularly after 1840. In June 1853 Ann Husler inherited Weetwood Quarry from her husband, and ran it successfully until her death in 1874.

== Buildings ==
=== Weetwood Hall ===
Weetwood Hall is now a hotel and conference centre, which includes a manor house and buildings of the same name dating back to 1625. It is a Grade II* Listed building of local gritstone ashlar. The porch is of Classical design, with widely spaced Ionic columns, and the interior has elaborately plastered ceilings. It was taken over by the University of Leeds in 1919 and was a hall of residence until 1993, when it took on its present role after extensive re-development.

=== Fox Hill ===
Fox Hill is the name of a hill, a hall which stands on it, and a residential area within Weetwood. The hall was built in 1863 for the Tetley family of Tetley's Brewery. It is now Moorlands School. Fox hill also includes other Grade II Listed buildings, Weetwood Grange (1861), now flats, and Weetwood Croft (1898) now a university student residence, Oxley Hall.

== See also ==
- Listed buildings in Leeds (Weetwood Ward)
