= Whinmoor =

Suburb of Leeds in West Yorkshire, England

Coordinates: 53.832°N 1.446°W

- Suburb
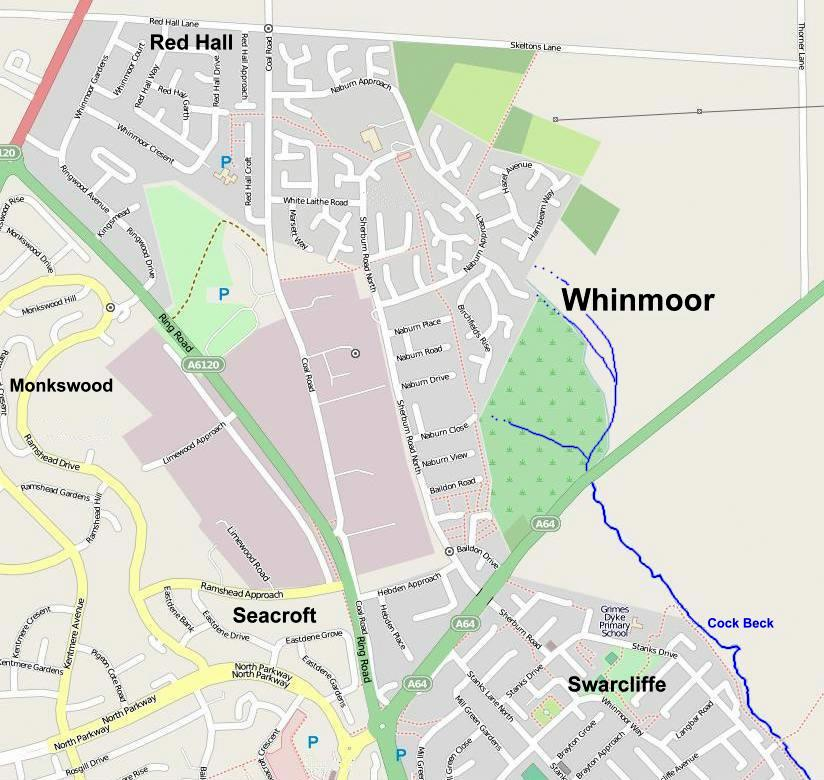
- Map of Whinmoor

- Location within West Yorkshire
- Population: 11,100
- OS grid reference: SE 35962 37539
- Metropolitan borough: City of Leeds
- Metropolitan county: West Yorkshire
- Region: Yorkshire and the Humber
- Country: England
- Sovereign state: United Kingdom
- Post town: Leeds
- Postcode district: LS14
- Dialling code: 0113
- Police: West Yorkshire
- Fire: West Yorkshire
- Ambulance: Yorkshire
- UK Parliament: Leeds East

Whinmoor is a residential area of east Leeds, West Yorkshire, England.

It is 5 miles (8 km) to the north-east of the city centre and adjacent to Swarcliffe and Seacroft in the LS14 Leeds postcode area.

Historically, the area was within the Tadcaster Rural District until 1974. It is today situated in the Leeds City Council ward of Cross Gates and Whinmoor and Leeds East parliamentary constituency.

== History ==
In November 655 AD (or perhaps in 654, according to one interpretation of the chronology), the Battle of the Winwaed took place around the Whinmoor/Cock Beck/Swarcliffe area, with the Christian King Oswiu of Bernicia's army defeating the pagan army of King Penda of Mercia, although historians admit that few details are available. A road to the south of Whinmoor was later named Penda's Way.

In addition, during the First English Civil War, the Battle of Seacroft Moor, 30 March 1643, was fought over the two moors of Winn Moor and Bramham Moor, near Leeds. There is no exact records of Army positions, due to the amount of movement during the battle. As Sir Thomas Fairfax was instructed to capture Tadcaster, the Royalist Northern major-general, Sir William Cavendish, 1st Duke of Newcastle-upon-Tyne planned to intercept the smaller opposition. He sent his Lieutenant-General, Lord George Goring to do so; leading a large force of Horse. Fairfax had a problem, due to having a force made up of mainly clubmen (Locally recruited soldiers) and only three troops of Cavalry; this was going to be a 'wake-up-call' for the Parliamentary forces in the North. He was literally 'thrashed' by Goring, beaten back over the moor, with many casualties. Fairfax escaped with just some of his surviving Horse to Leeds, mainly because of bad communication in the ranks. Fairfax quoted that it was "the greatest loss we ever received".

== Crime ==
Crime in Whinmoor has slowly decreased, although there are still reported crimes of drug dealing and car theft.

In October 2022, 322 Crimes reported, of which Whinmoor Way, Baildon Close and Farndale Garth had the highest crime reported on streets, with 19, 12 and 11 crimes committed respectively.

== Other information ==
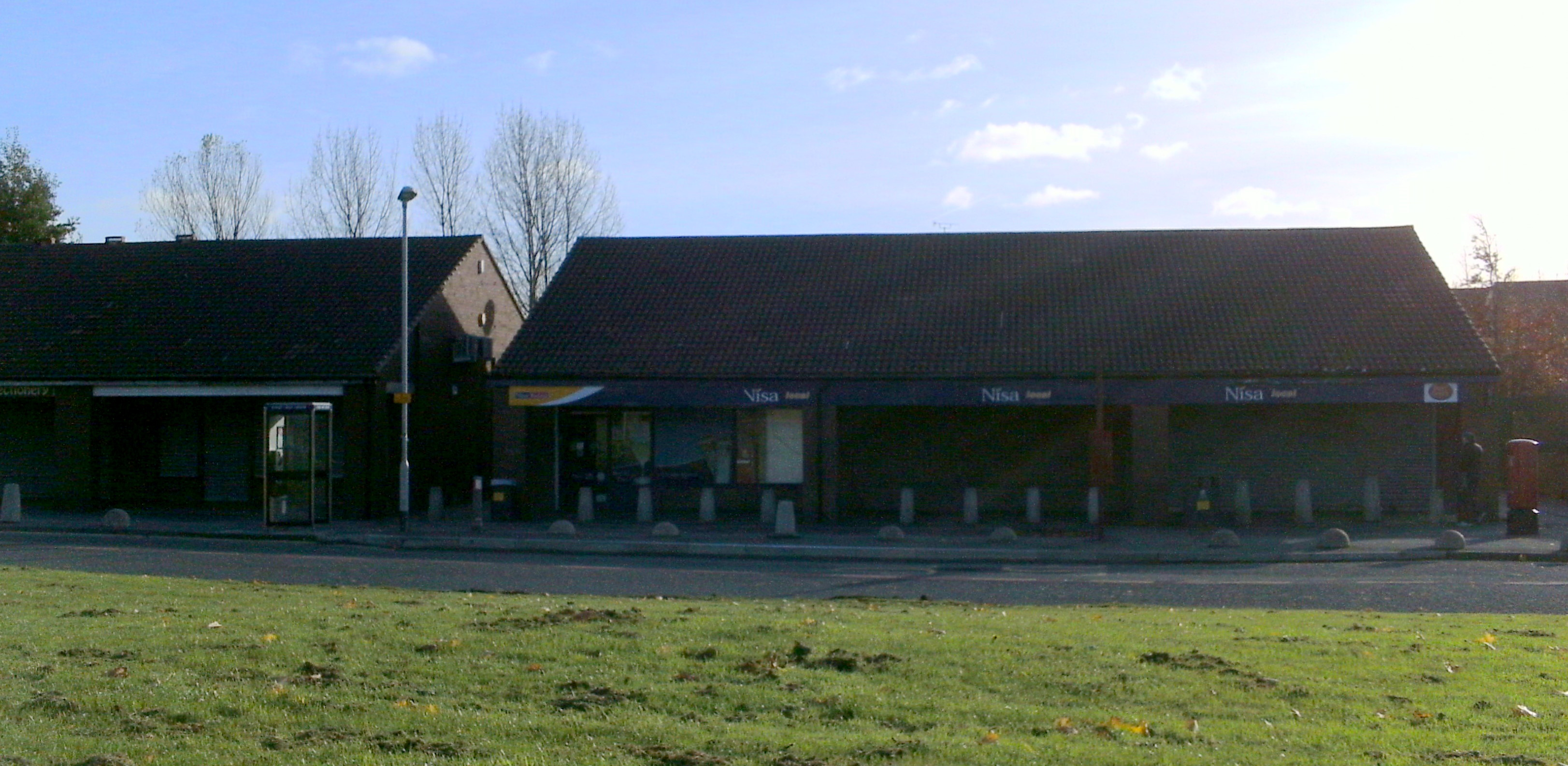
The convenience stores at the Whinmoor terminus.

Whinmoor was often mistaken as a part of Seacroft. Since the development came in the early 1970s, the name was adopted and entered formal use. It formerly had a large proportion of council housing, of which most are now privately owned.

Until 2010, the area was part of the Elmet constituency. Colin Burgon served as the Member of Parliament for the area for 13 years having defeated the long-serving Conservative MP, Spencer Batiste, in 1997. It now sits within the Leeds East constituency, which includes Cross Gates, Whinmoor, Seacroft, Gipton, Harehills, Killingbeck, Temple Newsam, Halton Moor, Halton, Whitkirk, Colton and Austhorpe. The current MP is Labour's Richard Burgon.

Whinmoor was also the eastern terminus for First Leeds’ “overground” St. James’ Line: 16, 16a and 56 running to Whinmoor bus terminus.

Unilever Leeds is on Coal Road joined with the larger Seacroft Industrial Estate going from the Ramshead and Monskwood areas of Seacroft to the Naburn area of Whinmoor, with the B6902 (formerly the A6120 Ring Road) running through the middle.

Leeds City Council purchased Whinmoor from the Tadcaster Rural District Council to build homes as an extension of the Seacroft housing development. In the early 1960s the council had planned to build 5,000 dwellings, a small shopping centre and other amenities with a pedestrian link to Seacroft.

New homes have been built off of the A64 York Road, near the now closed Old Red Lion, by Strata proving 2-5 bedroomed affordable housing for Leeds’ growing housing demand. As well as a new houses built on the old Unilever car park, adjacent to the Seacroft Industrial Estate, between the B6902 and Coal Road built by Redrow.

The new construction of the East Leeds Orbital Road and road improvements to the old Ring Road (B902) will provide more change in the coming years, bringing an additional 52,000 new homes across East Leeds, and up to 18,000 new homes in Whinmoor alone as a part of the Whinmoor Fields area (Northern Quadrant of the East Leeds Extension).

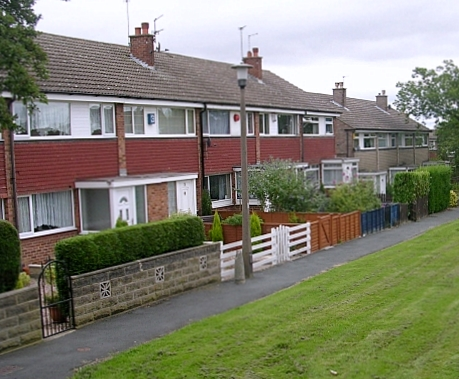
Hathaway Walk, Whinmoor

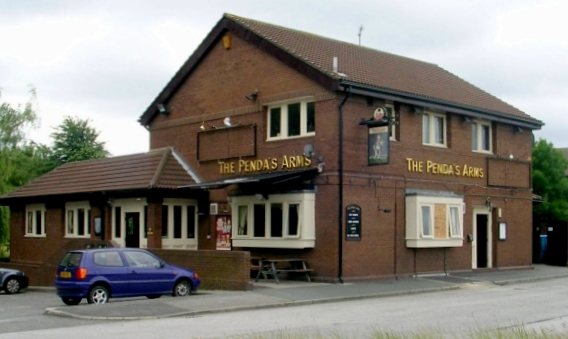
The Penda's Arms, Naburn Approach

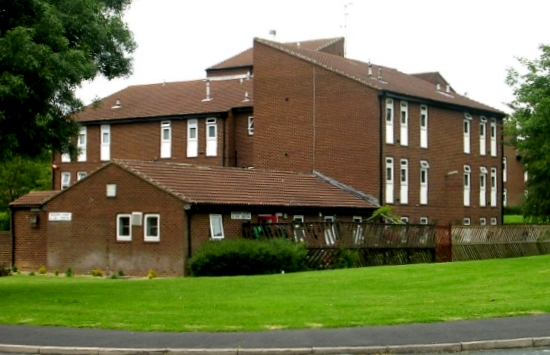
Naburn Court and Day Centre, Naburn Approach

== Sources ==
- Campbell, James (1995). Essays in Anglo-Saxon History. Hambledon Continuum. ISBN 978-0-907628-33-0.
