= Marjorie Ziff =

British philanthropist (1929–2023)

Marjorie Esther Ziff MBE (née Morrison; 26 May 1929 – 3 April 2023) was a British philanthropist recognised for her contributions to the Jewish community in Leeds. She was the wife of businessperson and philanthropist Arnold Ziff.

== Career ==
Ziff supported many local and international groups through charitable donations and was a trustee of the Marjorie and Arnold Ziff Charitable Foundation, founded in 1966. She was a life patron of the Leeds Jewish Welfare Board, and an honorary graduate and longstanding friend of the University of Leeds. Marjorie and her husband Arnold began supporting the Leeds International Piano Competition in 1981. Marjorie was the President of The Friends of Roundhay Park, a charitable organisation formed in 1994, which is dedicated to the preservation of Roundhay Park in Leeds. She has also acted as a representative for the Yorkshire Evening Post in local competitions and award ceremonies.

=== Buildings ===
On 29 May 1964, her 35th birthday, Marjorie opened Merrion Centre, Leeds. In 2019, on the 55th anniversary of its opening, she returned there to open a month-long exhibition about the building. The Centre has frequently been used as a location for the local school Variety Club in order to benefit disabled and disadvantaged students.

In 2005, the Marjorie and Arnold Ziff Community Centre was opened in Moortown in recognition of their contributions made to the Jewish community in Leeds.

In 2006, the University of Leeds announced that the Marjorie and Arnold Ziff Building would be funded by a substantial donation from the family foundation and businesses, in memory of Arnold Ziff, who had died in 2004. In 2009, Marjorie opened this building, on her 80th birthday.

In 2007, Leeds Art Gallery was refurbished and the Queen's Gallery was renamed the Arnold and Marjorie Ziff Gallery in recognition of their patronage of the arts.

In July 2008, Tropical World in Leeds was renamed The Arnold and Marjorie Ziff Tropical World to recognise their significant financial contribution.

== Personal life and death ==
Marjorie and Arnold Ziff were married for 52 years and had three children together; Ann, Michael and Edward. They had 13 grandchildren.

Ziff died on 3 April 2023, at the age of 93.

== Honours and recognition ==
Ziff received an MBE in the 2011 New Year Honours for her services to the community in Leeds.

In 2011 Frances Segelman, known for her sculptures of celebrities, made a bronze sculpture of Ziff.

The University of Leeds awarded Ziff an honorary doctorate of laws (LL.D.) on 14 July 2005, describing her as "a staunch supporter of the city" and "a longstanding supporter and friend of the University".
