= Moortown, Leeds =

Suburb of Leeds in West Yorkshire, England

Coordinates: 53.8445°N 1.5339°W

Moortown
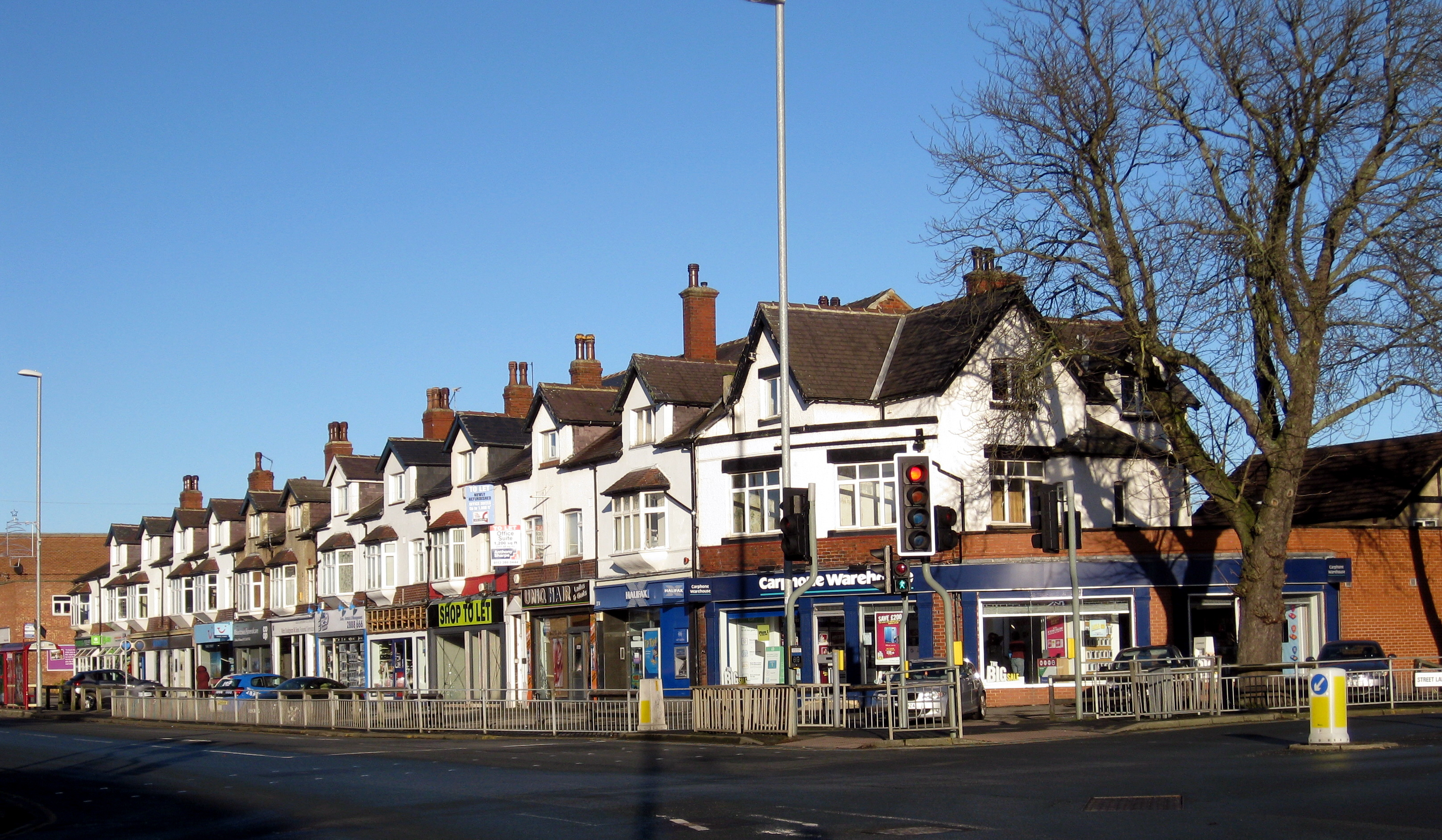
- Parade of shops at Moortown Corner

- Location within West Yorkshire
- Population: 22,792 (2011)
- Metropolitan borough: City of Leeds
- Metropolitan county: West Yorkshire
- Region: Yorkshire and the Humber
- Country: England
- Sovereign state: United Kingdom
- Post town: LEEDS
- Postcode district: LS17 LS8
- Dialling code: 0113
- Police: West Yorkshire
- Fire: West Yorkshire
- Ambulance: Yorkshire
- UK Parliament: Leeds North East

Moortown is a suburb of Leeds, West Yorkshire, England. It is a civil parish and sits in the Moortown ward of Leeds City Council in the north east of the city.

It is situated between Roundhay and Gledhow on the east and Weetwood on the west, with Chapel Allerton to the south, and Alwoodley to the north. It is synonymous with Moor Allerton, and institutions in the area use both names. Moortown lies in the LS17 postcode district, which was reported to contain the most expensive housing area in Yorkshire and the Humber by The Times in 2007.

== General description ==
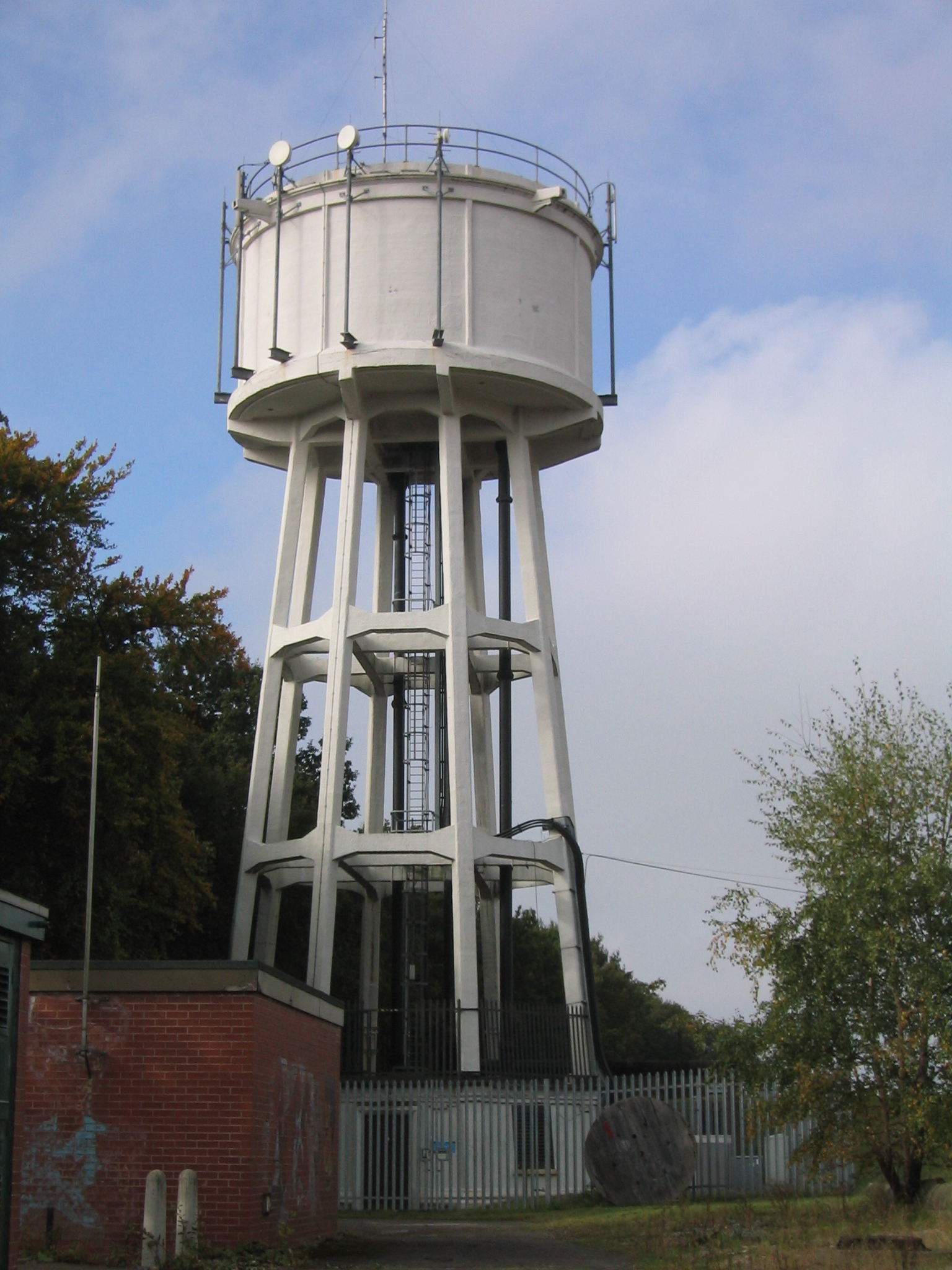
Moortown Water Tower, north of the Ring Road

The suburb is located around the junction of the (north-south) Harrogate Road A61 road and the Leeds Outer Ring Road (A6120) (west-east), at that point called the Moortown Ring Road, and overlooked by a Water Tower. Scott Hall Road (A61) and Harrogate Road lead southwards to Leeds city centre. The Leeds City Council boundary for Moortown ward is the Ring Road, with properties to the north in the Alwoodley ward. The Church of England parish includes areas north of the Ring Road. Woodland north and south of the Ring Road and by the water tower is called the Moortown Plantation. A post office, petrol station and other shops are located on Harrogate Road at the northern end of Moortown.

Moortown includes small estates of council housing around the junction of King Lane and the Moortown Ring Road.

== Moortown Corner ==
Moortown Corner is the junction between Street Lane and Harrogate Road, a local shopping area and geographical reference. The building known as the Corner House was built as a cinema (1938–1940), ballroom and restaurant but now contains shops. From 1968 to 2008 it contained a casino.

Moortown Corner is served by First Leeds service 2, which is represented red on the high frequency Leeds core bus network map. Less regularly, services 7A, 7S, and 48 run through Moortown Corner. Harrogate Bus Company's distinctive route 36 also serves Moortown Corner, currently as of June 2025, running between central Leeds and Harrogate every 10 minutes (continuing to Ripon every 30 minutes).

== Moor Allerton District Centre ==
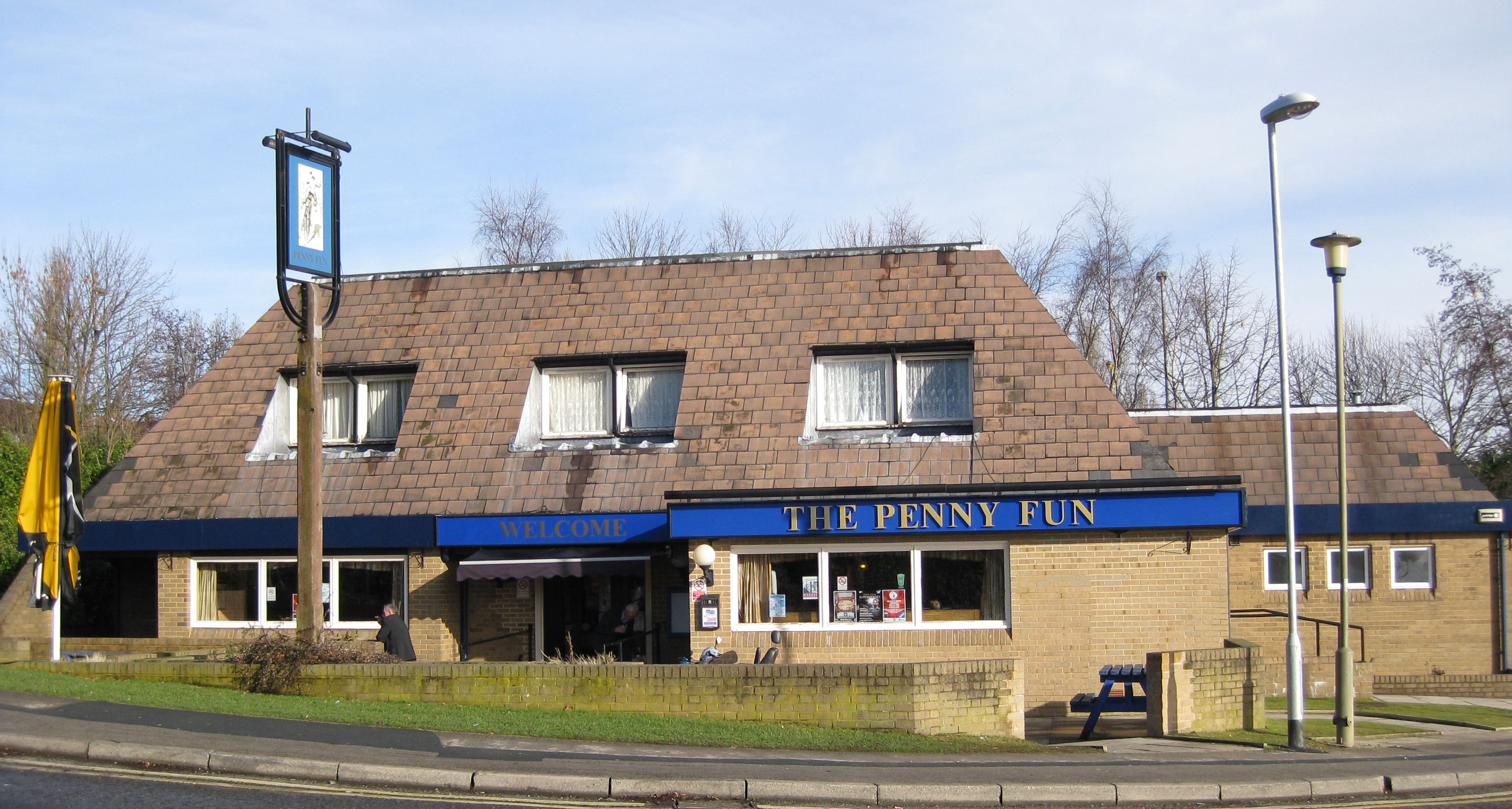
Penny Fun

Moor Allerton District Centre is adjacent to the Moortown estate (west), north of the Ring Road and west of the junction with King Lane, which opened in 1982. Primarily a shopping centre, with a large Sainsbury's, and a Homebase, it also includes a public library. A public house, the King on the Lane, was called the Penny Fun until 2019; its name relates to the history of the area as follows. The word 'pen' comes from the Celtic for 'hill'. What is now Tunnel How Hill is visible from the Centre to the south-west. It was previously Pen-how-fyn, and a hamlet around what is now the Centre was Paenfynaen (where fynaen means settlement). Tunnel How Hill was referred to as Penny Fun in the 19th century and several houses in the vicinity used the name. There is a Penny Field nearby in Meanwood Park.

== Housing estates ==
=== Black Moor and Cranmer Bank ===
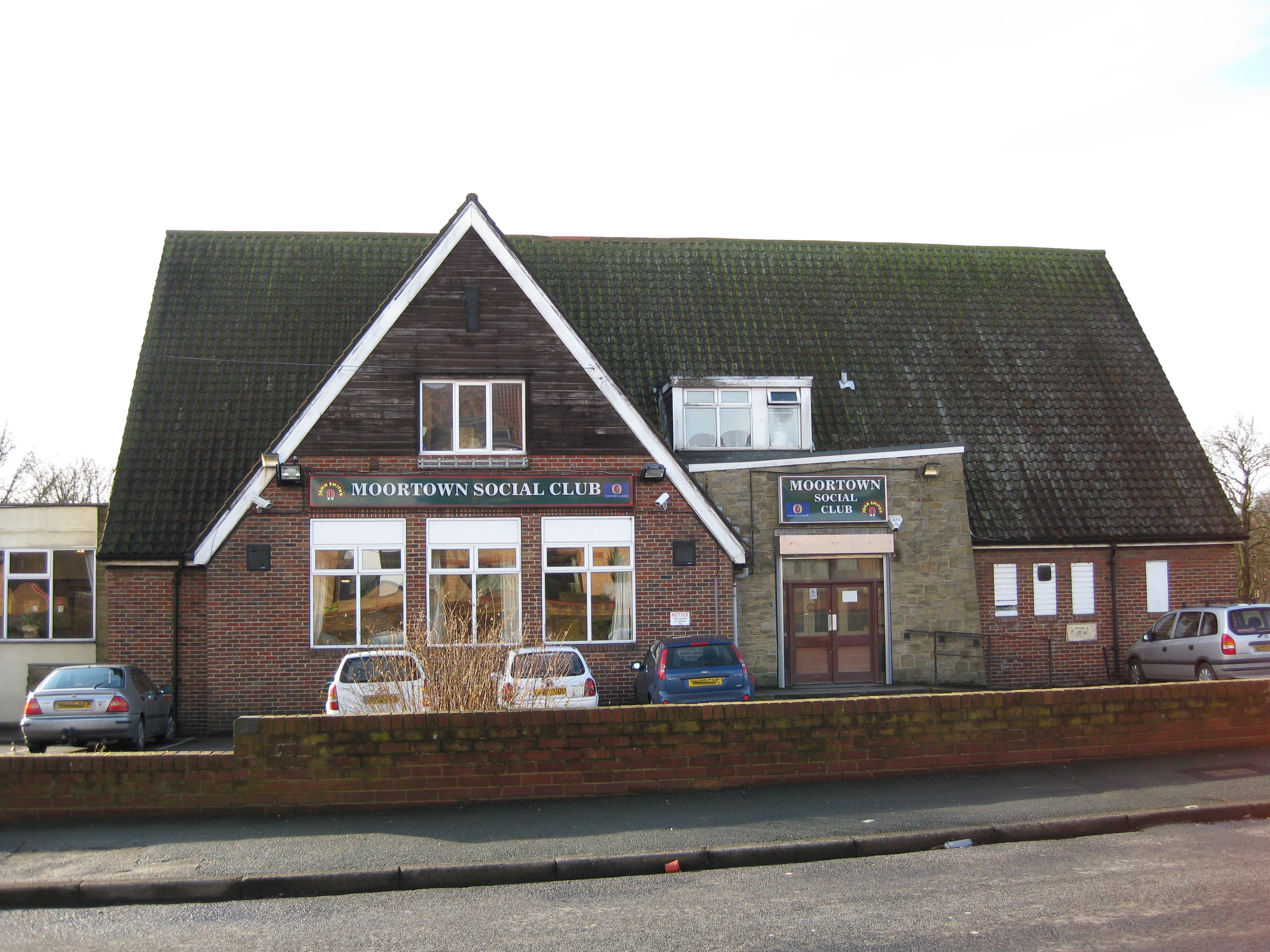
Moortown Social Club, Cranmer Gardens

To the north of the ring road and west of King Lane is the Moortown estate (west) and Cranmer Bank is part of the estate, named after the moor on which Moortown was situated. This has varied housing from the 1950s to recent along Black Moor road. There is a parade of shops on Cranmer Bank as well as Moortown Social Club at the top of the hill, along with St Stephen's Church (C of E). The main areas on the estate are Blackmoor, Tynwald, Deanswood, Scotland Wood, Cranmer Bank, Alderton and Saxon.

=== Lingfield ===
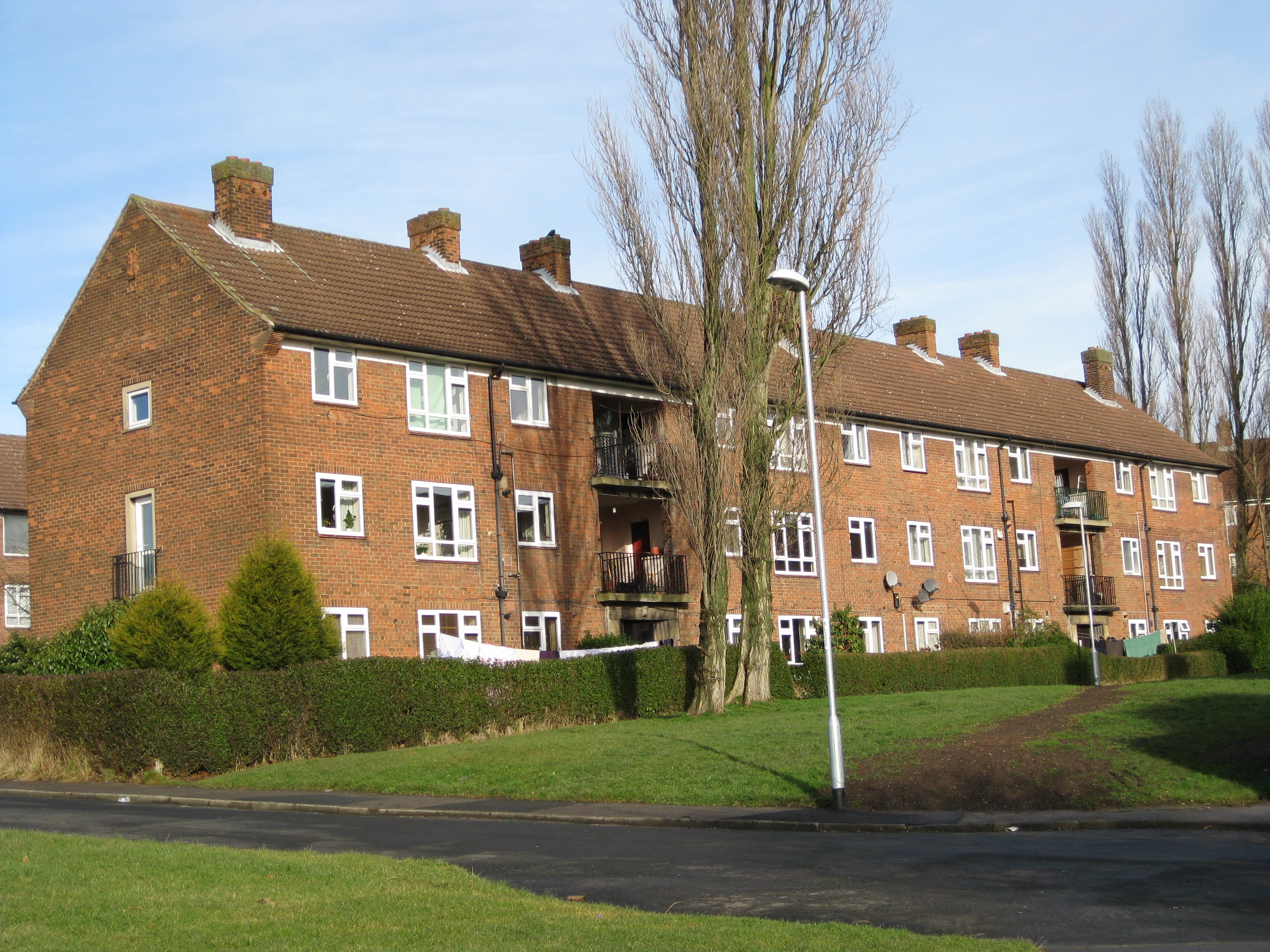
Flats on the Lingfield estate viewed from King Lane

To the north of the ring road and east of King Lane is the Lingfield Estate comprising mainly semi-detached tenant properties and council flats.

=== Queenshill ===
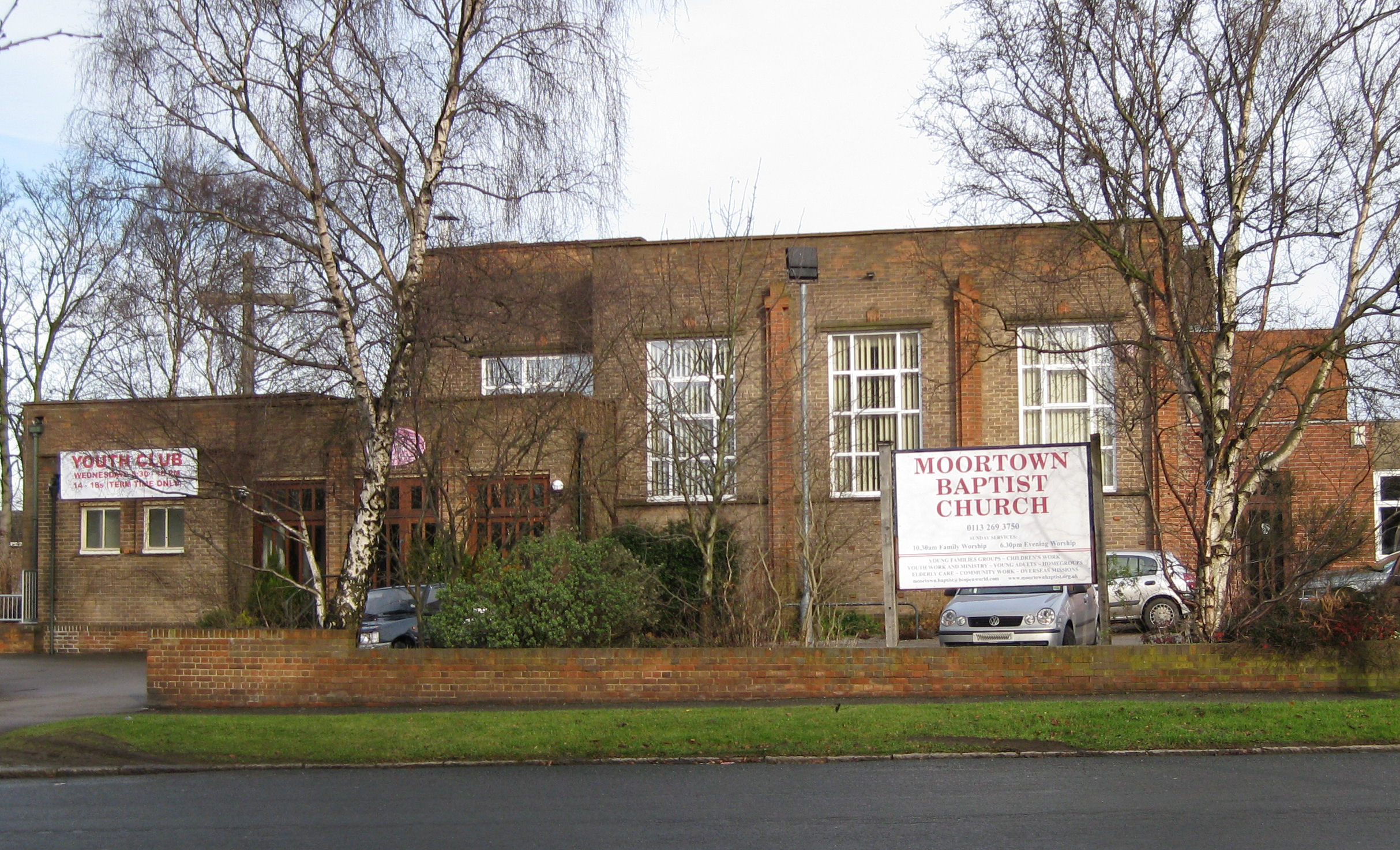
Moortown Baptist Church, King Lane

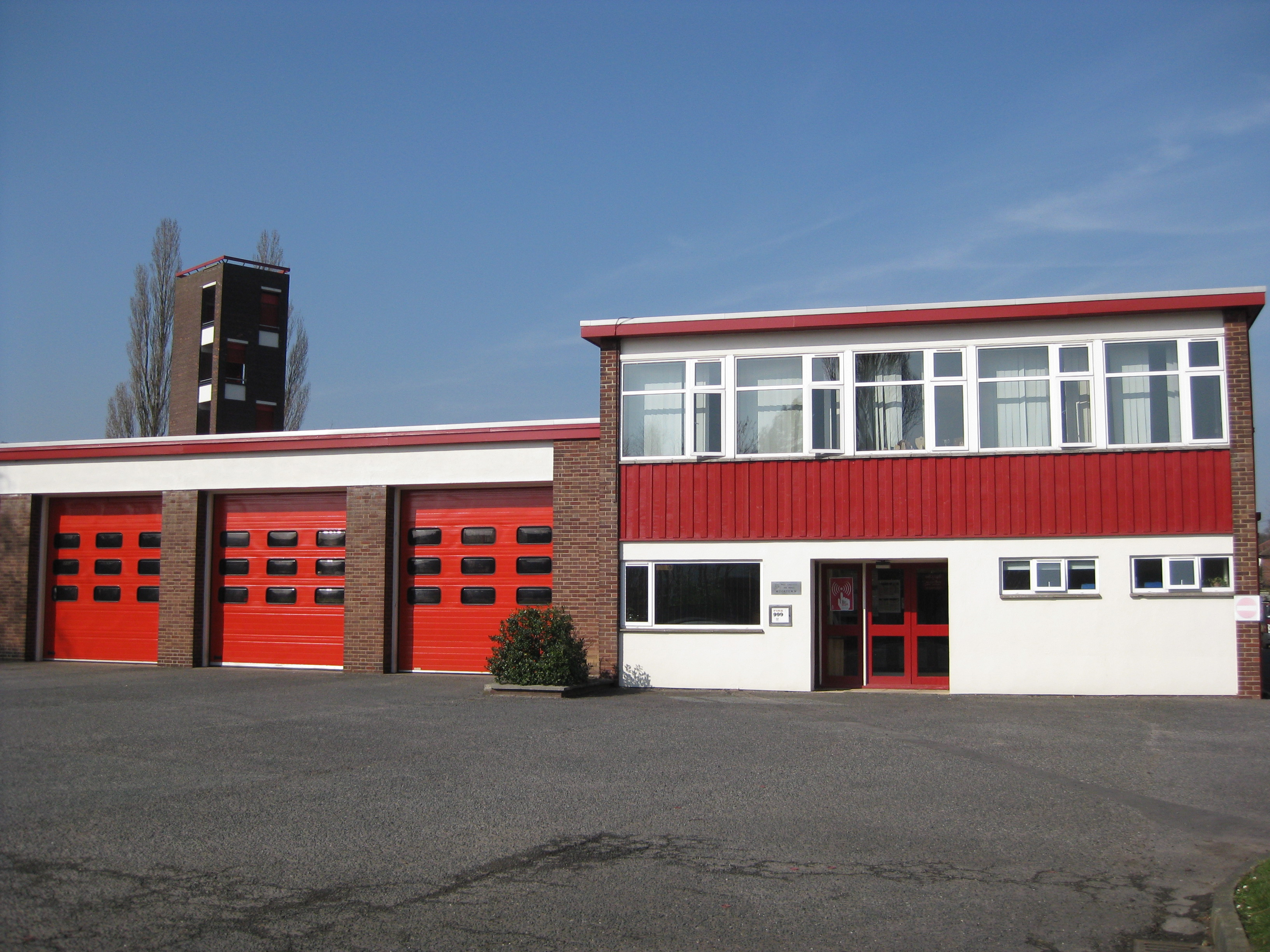
Fire Station, Stonegate Road

To the south of the ring road and east of King Lane is the Queenshill estate, mainly low-rise flats, which was opened in 1962 by Sir Keith Joseph. This area contains a small row of shops, a fire station, Moortown Baptist Church, and the offices of the Leeds Jewish Housing Association.

=== Leafield ===
A smaller development of public housing lies to the south of the ring road and west of King Lane, essentially in the grounds of a former mansion, Leafield House, later Leafield Clinic, where the former Leeds North Clinical Commissioning Group's offices were located, and which is now a nursery.

Leafield House was built around 1873 and was known initially as Albert House. In the 1920s, it was the family home of William Powell Bowman (1862-1955), the owner of Goodall, Backhouse & Co., who described his profession as a “wholesale druggist and manufacturer of the celebrated Yorkshire Relish". Millions of bottles of Yorkshire Relish – a piquant, cold sauce – were manufactured in the late 19th and early 20th centuries. Leafield House was bought in 1951 and two years later, the Leeds Corporation Health Committee submitted a planning application to turn the building into a maternity and child welfare centre. When clinical services were moved to more modern surroundings in 2012, Leafield House was refurbished to provide office space.

=== Darkwood ===
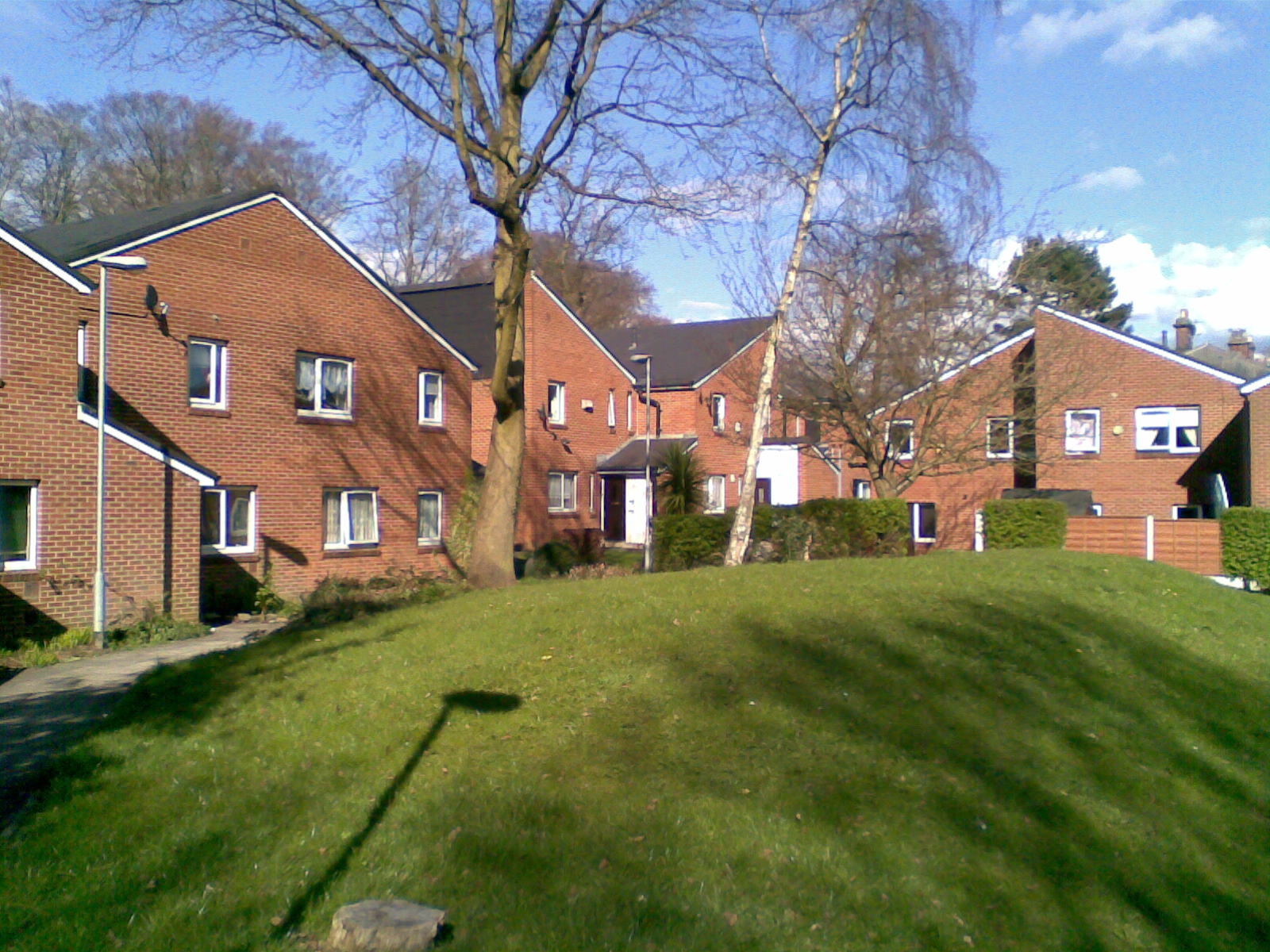
Darkwood housing estate

A small 1990 development low-rise flats off Shadwell Lane, in woods known as Blackwoods, part of the Forest of Leeds. The property was originally a large private estate called "Blackwood". It was acquired by the City of Leeds sometime prior to 1963 and converted into several large flats with the extensive grounds preserved until the subsequent development of low rise flats in the 1990s.

== Religion ==
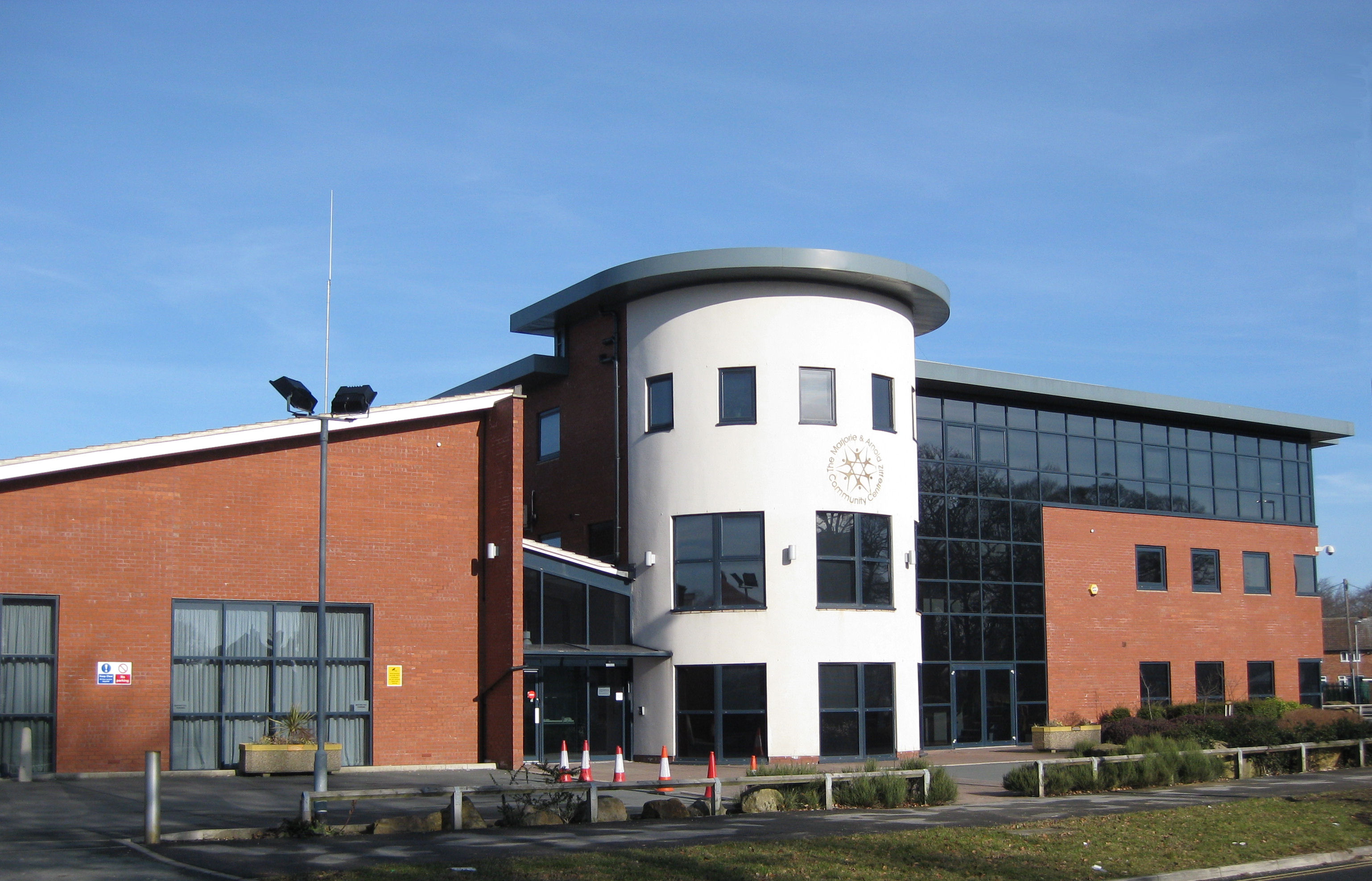
M. and A. Ziff Community Centre, home of Leeds Jewish Welfare Board

Moortown and neighbouring Alwoodley are the main centres of the Leeds Jewish community. There are three synagogues in the Moortown area: the Beth Hamidrash Hagadol Synagogue on Street Lane, Etz Chaim Synagogue on Harrogate Road and the UHC Synagogue on Shadwell Lane. The Marjorie and Arnold Ziff Community Centre opened in 2005, providing facilities for the Jewish community in Leeds and district, with the only Kosher restaurant in Leeds and providing offices for some Jewish organisations. The Church of England parish church is St John the Evangelist on the corner of Harrogate Road and the ring road; the Catholic church is the Immaculate Heart of Mary Church. There is also a Baptist church on King Lane. Moortown Methodist Church Centre is located in the Black Moor area: it is currently used by Showers of Mercy Ministries International, Lighthouse Chapel and Leeds Independent Seventh Day Adventist Church, but there are no regular Methodist services there. There are three mosques which also act as Muslim community centres, including one in the former "Lingfield" public house on Lingfield Hill, which opened in 2016.

== St Gemma's Hospice ==
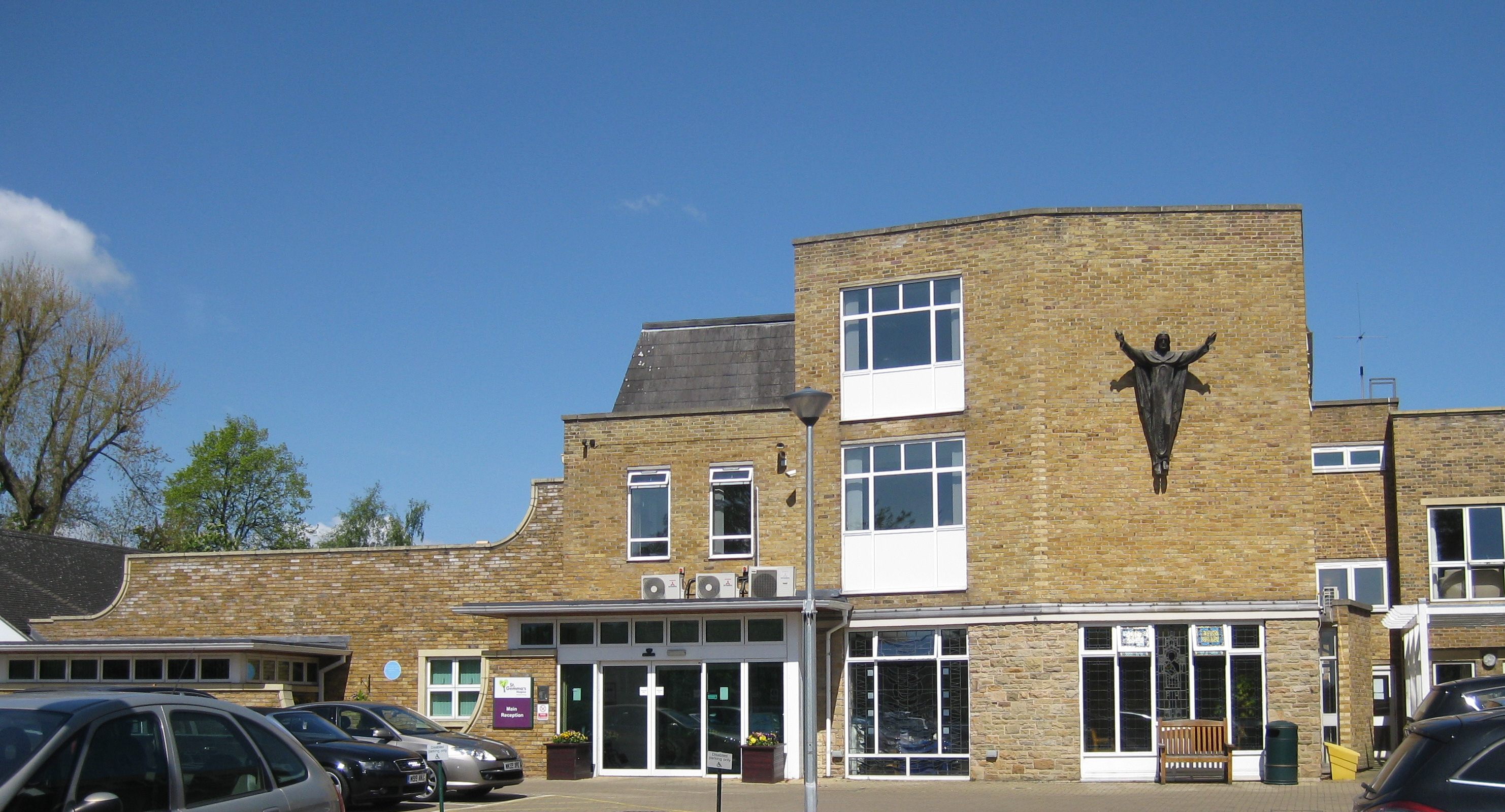
St Gemma's Hospice, Main Entrance

Moortown is home to St Gemma's Hospice, a charity hospice founded by the Sisters of the Cross and Passion in 1978. It is named after St Gemma's School which formerly occupied the site, in turn named after Italian Saint Gemma Galgani. This is situated to the south of Moortown Corner on Harrogate Road. In 2017 it became a University Teaching Hospice in association with the University of Leeds to give instruction in palliative care for health professionals. St Gemma's Hospice operates 24 charity shops around Leeds.

== Sport ==
There is a Rugby Union football club. Moortown Golf Club hosted the 1929 Ryder Cup, but is well north of the Ring Road and is now in the Alwoodley ward. Moor Allerton Sports and Social Centre has bowls, tennis and indoor activities. North Leeds FC's home pitch is situated on Cranmer Bank, next to Moortown Social Club.

== Governance ==
As of July 2022 there are three Labour Councillors and one Labour MP who are responsible for raising concerns / issues from the Moortown community. Moortown Community Group has a history on interacting with local councillors on behalf the local community, for example in working on the Council's Neighbourhood Design Statement.

== See also ==
- Listed buildings in Leeds (Moortown Ward)
