= Tropical World =

Tropical World may refer to:

- Tropical World (Leeds), Leeds, England
- Tropical World, Marwell Zoo, England
- Tropical World (Letterkenny), a zoo in Ireland
