= Listed buildings in Leeds (Moortown Ward) =

Moortown is a ward in the metropolitan borough of the City of Leeds, West Yorkshire, England. It contains 36 listed buildings that are recorded in the National Heritage List for England. All the listed buildings are designated at Grade II, the lowest of the three grades, which is applied to "buildings of national importance and special interest". The ward is to the north of the centre of Leeds, and contains the suburb of Moortown, the former village of Meanwood, and part of Moor Allerton. Most of the listed buildings are houses, cottages, and associated structures. The other listed buildings include a column, a well cover, former mill buildings, a church and a chapel and associated structures, a boundary stone, schools, and a war memorial.

== Buildings ==
Name and location	Photograph	Date	Notes
Alder Hill Cottages; 53.83193°N 1.56102°W		Early 17th century	A farmhouse that was later extended and divided into three cottages, it is in gritstone with quoins, stone gutter brackets, and a stone slate roof with gables that have moulded coping, shaped kneelers, and finials. There are two storeys, a main range of four bays with a continuous outshut at the rear, a gabled wing on the left, and a rear wing. Most of the openings have been altered. In the left return is a re-set lintel with an initialled and dated keystone, above which is a carved ram's head.
Column, Meanwood Park; 53.83387°N 1.57775°W		c. 1672	The column was originally in Mill Hill Unitarian Chapel, and was moved to its present site in about 1847. It is in gritstone, and consists of a Roman Doric column on a square base and plinth.
62 and 64 Parkside Road; 53.83722°N 1.57124°W		Early 18th century	A house that was extended to the left in the 19th century, and later divided, it is in gritstone, with a stone slate roof and two storeys. The older part has rusticated quoins, moulded gutter brackets, and kneelers. On the front is a 20th-century porch, and a Venetian window with a keystone in each floor. The later part has two bays, and contains square windows and a blocked doorway.
Meanwood Park Hospital; 53.83872°N 1.56707°W		c. 1762	A large house with a north wing added in 1814, the front remodelled in about 1834, and later used as a hospital. The house is in stone, the ground floor rusticated, with bracketed eaves, a balustered parapet, and a slate roof. There are two storeys and five bays, the middle bay projecting. In the centre is a porch with four fluted Ionic columns and an entablature with a balustrade forming a balcony. Above this is a tripartite window with a pediment on console brackets. The other windows are sashes, in the ground floor with wedge lintels and keystones, and in the upper floor with architraves, balustraded parapets and cornices on brackets. On the sides are full-height bow windows.
282 Harrogate Road; 53.83799°N 1.53857°W		Late 18th century	A house in gritstone on a plinth, with a sill band, moulded eaves, a blocking course, and a stone slate roof with coped gables. There are two storeys and an attic, and three bays. The central doorway has a plain surround, a fanlight, and a cornice. The windows are sashes, there is a small dormer in the roof, in the left return is a semicircular gable window, and the right return contains a round-headed attic window.
Allerton Lodge; 53.83892°N 1.53854°W		Late 18th century	The house was extended in the 19th century and has been divided into flats. It is in gritstone with a slate roof. There are two storeys and an attic, a main range of five bays, the middle three bays projecting under a pediment with an elliptical window in the tympanum, and a later wing on the left. The central doorway has a moulded architrave, a rectangular fanlight, and a cornice. The windows are sashes, there is a dormer in the attic, and in the right return is a lunette.
Wall, gate piers and gates, Carr Manor House; 53.83664°N 1.55499°W		Late 18th century (probable)	The boundary wall is in gritstone with rounded coping, it is about 2 metres (6 ft 7 in) high, and extends for about 175 metres (574 ft), and the gates are in wrought iron. There are three pairs of gate piers. The pair at the main entrance are rusticated with moulding below an entablature and a cornice. Those at the entrance to the former estate buildings are square with cornices, and those to the former gardens are square with pyramidal caps.
Moor Allerton School; 53.84004°N 1.52308°W		Late 18th century	A country house, later used as a school, it is stuccoed and has a hipped slate roof. There are two storeys, and a centre of three bays, flanked by three-window bows. In the centre is a porch with Tuscan columns and an entablature, and above the central range is a balustraded parapet. The windows are sashes in moulded architraves. In the right return are three bays, the middle bay projecting.
The Revolution Well; 53.83662°N 1.55532°W		1788	A well cover built in gritstone slabs with wrought iron supports, and a pyramidal roof. It is about 1 metre (3 ft 3 in) high and 0.8 metres (2 ft 7 in) wide. On the south side is a round-arched opening, and on the north side is an inscription.
Grange Cottage; 53.82885°N 1.56916°W		c. 1800	The house, which was extended in about 1840, is in stone with raised quoins, a sill band, and a slate roof with coped gables. There are two storeys and three bays, and a recessed two-bay wing to the left with a single-storey lean-to. The doorway has a moulded surround, a fanlight, and a flat hood. The windows in the main block are cross casements, and in the wing they are sashes.
Mill to south of Highbury Works; 53.82838°N 1.57061°W		c. 1800	A paper mill, later a tannery, and subsequently converted for residential use. The building is in stone with quoins, a sill band and a hipped roof. There are three storeys and fronts of 13 bays, the left five bays on the west front protruding.
Former Woodside Wesleyan Chapel; 53.83052°N 1.56881°W		1811	The chapel, which was extended in 1883 and later converted for other uses, is in gritstone on a plinth, and has a tile roof. There is one storey and five bays. The windows along the sides have round-arched heads and imposts. In the gabled front facing the road is a lunette.
Boundary stone 53.83486°N 1.55601°W		1812	The stone is a monolithic upright gritstone block about 1.5 metres (4 ft 11 in) high and 0.6 metres (2 ft 0 in) wide. There is an inscription on the south face.
Cottage and warehouse southeast of Highbury Works; 53.82848°N 1.57022°W		1824	A warehouse with an attached cottage, later converted for residential use. It is in stone with a hipped roof and has two storeys. In the north front is a large central cart entrance.
Moorfield House, outbuildings and walls 53.84446°N 1.54083°W		Early 19th century	A country house, later used for other purposes. It is in sandstone with a hipped grey slate roof. There are two storeys, and entrance front of three bays, a projecting two-bay left wing, and a five-bay garden front. The middle bay on the front is pedimented, and has a porch with pilasters, an entablature and a cornice flanked by bay windows. In the right return is a full-height semicircular three-window bay window. At the rear are outbuildings, including a stable with two storeys, a hipped roof, and a cupola. The wall is about 2 metres (6 ft 7 in) high, curved and ramped, and it contains a gateway with a pier.
Oddy's Fold; 53.83633°N 1.56870°W		Early 19th century	A terrace of six gritstone houses with stone slate roofs. There are two storeys, and each house has one bay. The doorways have tie-stone jambs, and the windows are sashes with lintels incised as voussoirs.
8–12 Tannery Square; 53.83129°N 1.57159°W		1834–37	A row of eight cottages, later five houses, in gritstone with a slate roof. There are two storeys and nine bays. The row contains a cart arch. All the openings have plain surrounds.
Warehouse, Highbury Works; 53.82869°N 1.57029°W		c. 1840	The former warehouse, which has been converted for residential use, is in stone with a hipped slate roof. There are two storeys, and it contains a cart entrance, windows, doorways and a loft door.
Meanwood Institute and wall 53.83121°N 1.57108°W		c. 1840	The building is in gritstone at the front and brick elsewhere, and has a slate roof. There is a single storey and three bays, the middle bay projecting and gabled, with double doors. The windows are mullioned and transomed, with three lights, and a Tudor hood mould. Enclosing the front and sides of the garden is a round-topped stone wall.
Meanwood School and Master's House; 53.83133°N 1.57303°W		1840	The school, which was later extended, and the master's house, are in stone on a plinth and have slate roofs with coped gables. The south front has a single storey and five bays, each containing a window with a pointed arch and a hood mould. To the right is a wall with a coped parapet, containing a doorway with a pointed arch and lancet windows. To the left is a two-storey block, and in the quadrangle is an octagonal bell tower. The house has two storeys and three bays, a central porch, sash windows, and gabled dormers.
Holy Trinity Church; 53.83156°N 1.56649°W		1848–49	The church was designed by William Railton in Gothic Revival style, and extended in 1876–77 and in 1882. It is built in gritstone with a slate roof, and consists of a nave, a south aisle, a south porch, north and south transepts, a chancel and a south vestry, and a steeple at the crossing. The steeple has a two-stage tower and a broach spire with pinnacles, lucarnes, and clock faces, and the windows are lancets.
Lych gate, Holy Trinity Church; 53.83153°N 1.56793°W		c. 1849	The lych gate at the entrance to the churchyard is in stone, with a stone slate roof, and it is in Gothic Revival style. It has a square plan, a steeply pitched roof with a tall gable each side, a cusped moulded archway, and paired wooden gates. In the vault are bosses and segmental-arched niches, and inside the archway are stone benches.
94 and 96 Green Road; 53.83124°N 1.57132°W		Mid 19th century	A pair of mirror-image cottages at the end of a row, they are in gritstone, and have a slate roof with coped gables. The doorways and windows have plain surrounds, the doorways with tie-stone jambs, and the windows with small panes.
60 Parkside Road; 53.83718°N 1.57115°W		Mid 19th century (probable)	A pair of cottages, later combined, the house is in gritstone with quoins, moulded stone gutters, and a stone slate roof with coped gables, moulded on the left. There are two storeys and two bays. Above the doorways is moulding and a cornice, and the windows are square with small frames.
Lodge to Meanwood Hall; 53.83567°N 1.56396°W		Mid 19th century	The lodge is in stone, it has deep eaves on paired brackets, and a slate roof, hipped on the right. There is one storey and two bays, the left bay projecting. The doorway has an architrave and a cornice on console brackets, and the windows have cambered heads, keystones, and sill brackets.
1–7 Tannery Square; 53.83123°N 1.57204°W		1852–60	A terrace of back to back cottages, later flats, in gritstone with a slate roof. There are two storeys and nine bays. The original openings have been altered.
Beckett Family mausoleum 53.83155°N 1.56603°W		1850s	The mausoleum in the churchyard of Holy Trinity Church is in stone, and in High Victorian Gothic style. It has a plinth, a pyramidal roof with crockets, lucarnes, gables, and gabled niches containing carved flower heads and the family coat of arms. The entrance is below ground on the west side.
Highbury Works; 53.82914°N 1.57027°W		1857	Originally Meanwood Tannery, it was converted for residential use in 1998. It is in stone on a plinth, with quoins, a sill band, and paired eaves brackets. There are three storeys and two ranges at right angles of 27 and 21 bays. In the main range is a round-arched cart entrance flanked by segmental-headed windows, and above it is an inscribed and dated plaque. The other range contains a segmental-headed cart entrance, and in two bays there are loading doors.
Meanwood Towers; 53.83629°N 1.55835°W		1867	The house was designed by E. W. Pugin in High Victorian Gothic style, and has been converted into flats. It is in gritstone with slate roofs. There are three storeys, attics and cellars, and a single-storey five-bay service wing with a projecting octagonal bell turret. The entrance tower has a doorway with a Gothic arch and attached columns, and above it is an oriel window on deep brackets. The windows are mullioned or mullioned and transomed, Other features include gables, gargoyles, eaves brackets, finials, bay windows, balconies, dormers, and a tall canted oriel stair window.
The Lodge; 53.83458°N 1.55857°W		c. 1867	The former lodge to Meanwood Towers is in gritstone, it has a slate roof with a crested ridge, and gables with cusped piercing to the bargeboards, and wrought iron finials with pennants pierced with "K". There are two storeys, two bays facing the road, and three bays facing the former drive. On the front facing the road is a bay window and a segmental-arched window above, facing the drive is a three-light mullioned window, and in the angle is an entrance tower containing a doorway with a fanlight in a pointed arch.
Carr Manor Cottages; 53.83703°N 1.55410°W		Late 19th century	A pair of cottages designed by E. S. Prior, they are in gritstone with timber framing in the gables and a stone slate roof with stepped gable ends. There are two storeys and four bays. The windows are mullioned, with two, three or four lights.
Carr Manor House; 53.83651°N 1.55387°W		1881	The house was designed by E. S. Prior and extended in 1899–1900. It is in millstone grit, with an embattled parapet to the right, and a slate roof with stepped gables on the ends. There are two storeys and attics, and five gable bays on the front, the right two bays recessed and the middle bay projecting. The doorway has a stepped hood mould, there are mullioned and transomed windows in the ground floor, and mullioned windows in the upper floor. Above the middle window in the upper floor is a sundial. An arcade of segmental arches connects the main range to a range to the north.
Stables and coach house, Carr Manor House; 53.83663°N 1.55400°W		1881	The stables and coach house, later used for other purposes, were designed by E. S. Prior. The building is in millstone grit with coved eaves containing timber framing and roughcast panels, and a stone slate roof. There are two storeys and five bays. In the centre is a gabled elliptical-arched carriage entrance with timber framing inside the arch. The windows are mullioned, and on the roof is a ventilation cupola with an ogee lead roof. The right return contains a re-set datestone and a corbelled and gabled dovecote.
Fairfax House; 53.83820°N 1.57264°W		c. 1905	The house, which was rebuilt with material from an earlier house, is in gritstone, and has a stone slate roof with coped gables, moulded kneelers, and shaped finials. There are two storeys and three bays. The doorway has a chamfered quoined surround and the lintel, on brackets, is cut to a shallow pointed arch, it has a panel inscribed with a date and initials, and there is moulding above it. The windows are mullioned, those in the ground floor with hood moulds.
War memorial 53.82986°N 1.56820°W		c. 1920	The war memorial, which was designed by A. R. Powys, is in the form of a shelter, with a gritstone base, timber framing with weatherboarding, and a stone slate roof. In the shelter is a bronze crucifix with a halo in blue enamel, and under the canopy are gold stars on a white background. On the rear wall is an inscription and the names of those lost in the First World War, and a bronze plaque has been added with the names of those lost in the Second World War.
