= Forest of Leeds =

Woodland in Leeds, West Yorkshire, England

Coordinates: 53.800°N 1.549°W

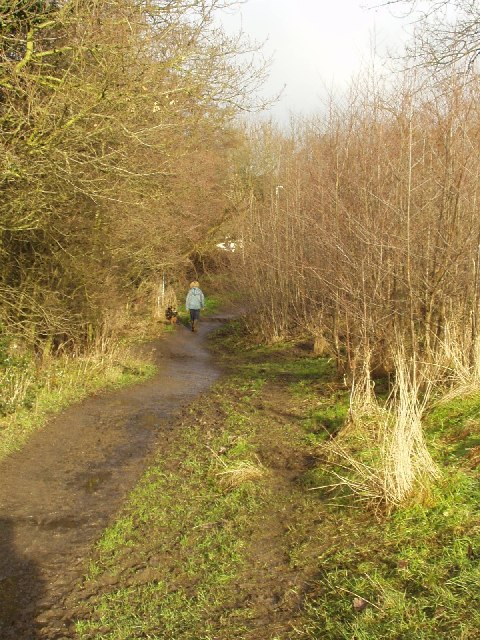
Trail in the woodland of Meanwood Valley

The Forest of Leeds was originally the Forest of Loidis in which today's city of Leeds arose. It now refers to patches of woodland throughout the metropolitan district, managed by Leeds City Council amounting to 1200 hectares. These are in 55 units of various kinds of woodlands, including those of Belle Isle, Gledhow, Golden Acre Park, Lotherton Hall, Meanwood Valley, Middleton Park, Moortown, Roundhay Park, Temple Newsam and Woodhouse Ridge, formed as a forest in 1993.
