= Happy Shopper =

English brand of independent convenience products

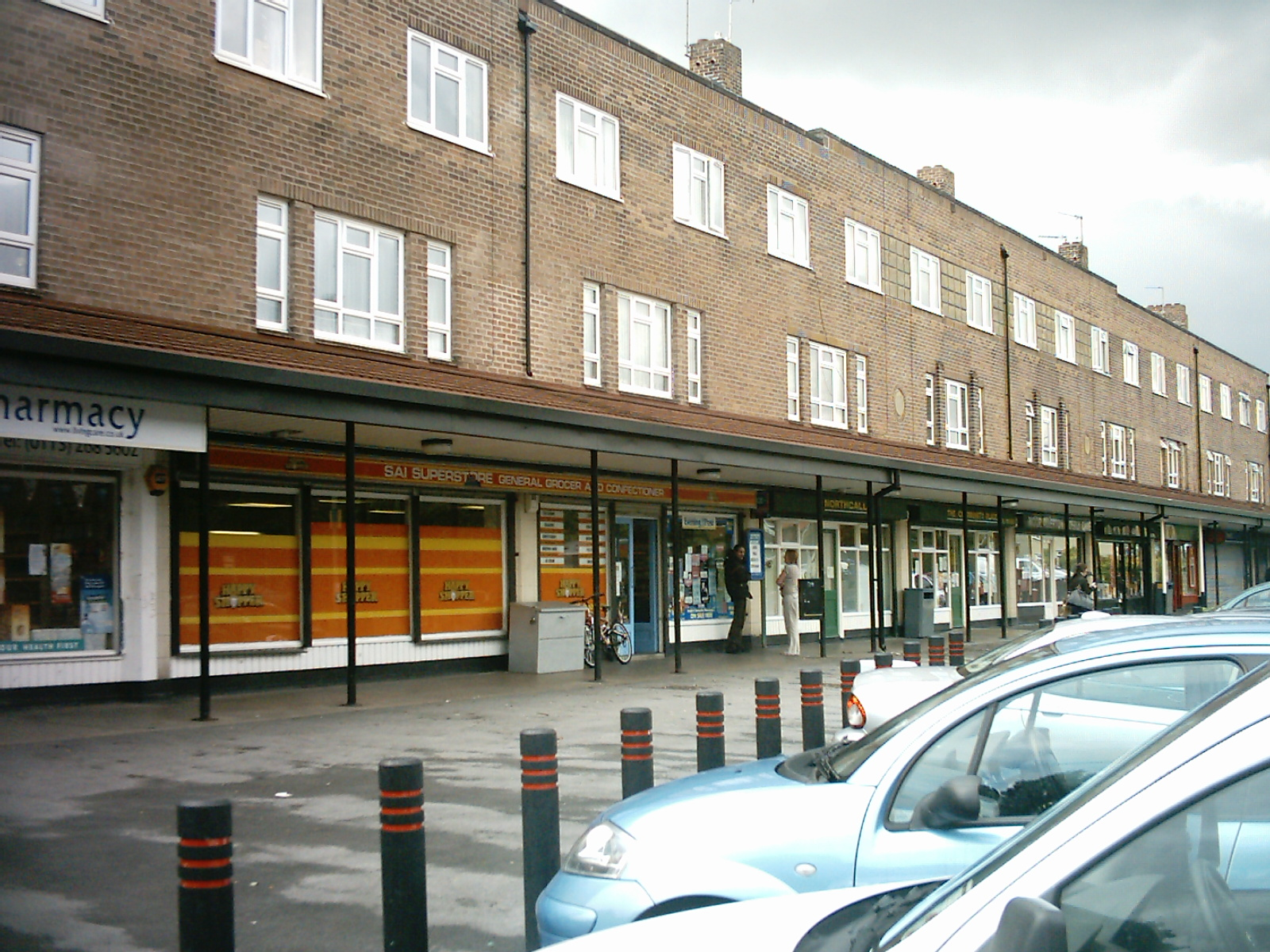
The Happy Shopper, at the Cramner Bank Shops, on the Black Moor Estate in Moor Allerton, Leeds

The original Happy Shopper logo

Happy Shopper was a brand of budget-priced groceries and household products that was sold in the United Kingdom. The brand was originally owned by cash and carry company Nurdin and Peacock, who were subsequently acquired by Booker Group in November 1996. Happy Shopper products are sold in discount stores, convenience stores, and other retail outlets throughout the country.

== History ==
The name was also used broadly for a convenience store franchise between 1971 and 1998, but as of 2020, very few stores still operate under the Happy Shopper banner. Most Happy Shopper stores rebranded under the Premier Stores brand during the 2000s, another name also controlled by Booker Group.

Some Happy Shopper stores still exist, primarily in the East Midlands (Nottingham, Derby, Ilkeston), and in the South East, predominantly in suburban estates.

Happy Shopper convenience products are distributed to independent convenience stores, off licences and discount stores, as well as cash and carry companies. Products include groceries, frozen foods, carbonated drinks, prepackaged/dried foods and confectionery, and are classed as part of Premier's own brand range.

The original brand's logo was a smiling face with blonde hair. This logo was dropped from the Happy Shopper products and packaging in 2000, as part of a redesign by Partners In Communication, a design consultant company.

As of 2024, the Jack's brand has replaced the Happy Shopper brand.
