= Arnold Ziff =

British businessman and philanthropist (1927–2004)

Arnold Ziff OBE
- Born: Israel Arnold Ziff; 31 January 1927; Leeds, England
- Died: 14 July 2004 (aged 77)
- Education: Leeds University
- Occupations: Businessman, philanthropist
- Title: High Sheriff of West Yorkshire
- Term: 1991–1992
- Spouse: Marjorie Esther Morrison (m. 1952)
- Children: 3
- Awards: Freeman of the City of London (1979)

Israel Arnold Ziff OBE (31 January 1927 – 14 July 2004) was a British businessman and philanthropist, who particularly donated to good causes within Leeds, West Yorkshire. He was made a Freeman of the City of London in 1979 and received an OBE in the 1981 Birthday Honours. From 1991 to 1992 he was High Sheriff of West Yorkshire.

== Life ==
Ziff's family was of Russian origin. He was born 31 January 1927 in Leeds and attended both Roundhay School and Leeds University, where he studied economics, but did not complete the degree, being called up for national service. He inherited his father's shoe company Stylo, and formed property company Town Centre Securities in 1959. A notable development was the Merrion Centre, Leeds.

In 1952 he married Marjorie Esther Morrison (born 26 May 1929). They had 2 sons, Michael (born 1953) and Edward (born 1960) who continued his business, as CEOs of Stylo and Town Centre Securities respectively. Arnold and Marjorie also had a daughter, Ann Louise.

Arnold's wife, Marjorie Ziff received an MBE in the 2011 New Year Honours for services to the community in Leeds.

== Benefactions ==
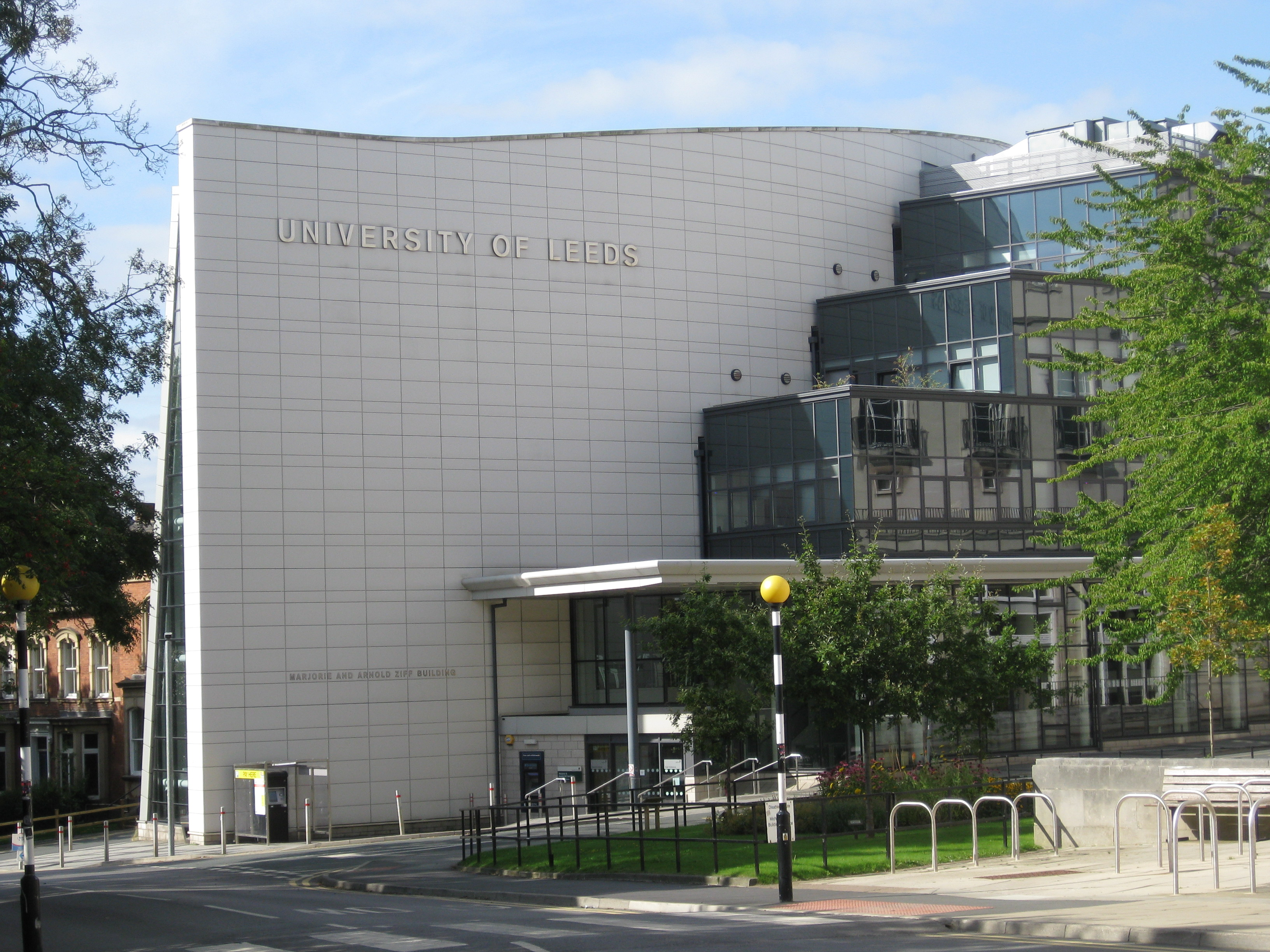
The Marjorie and Arnold Ziff Building, at the University of Leeds

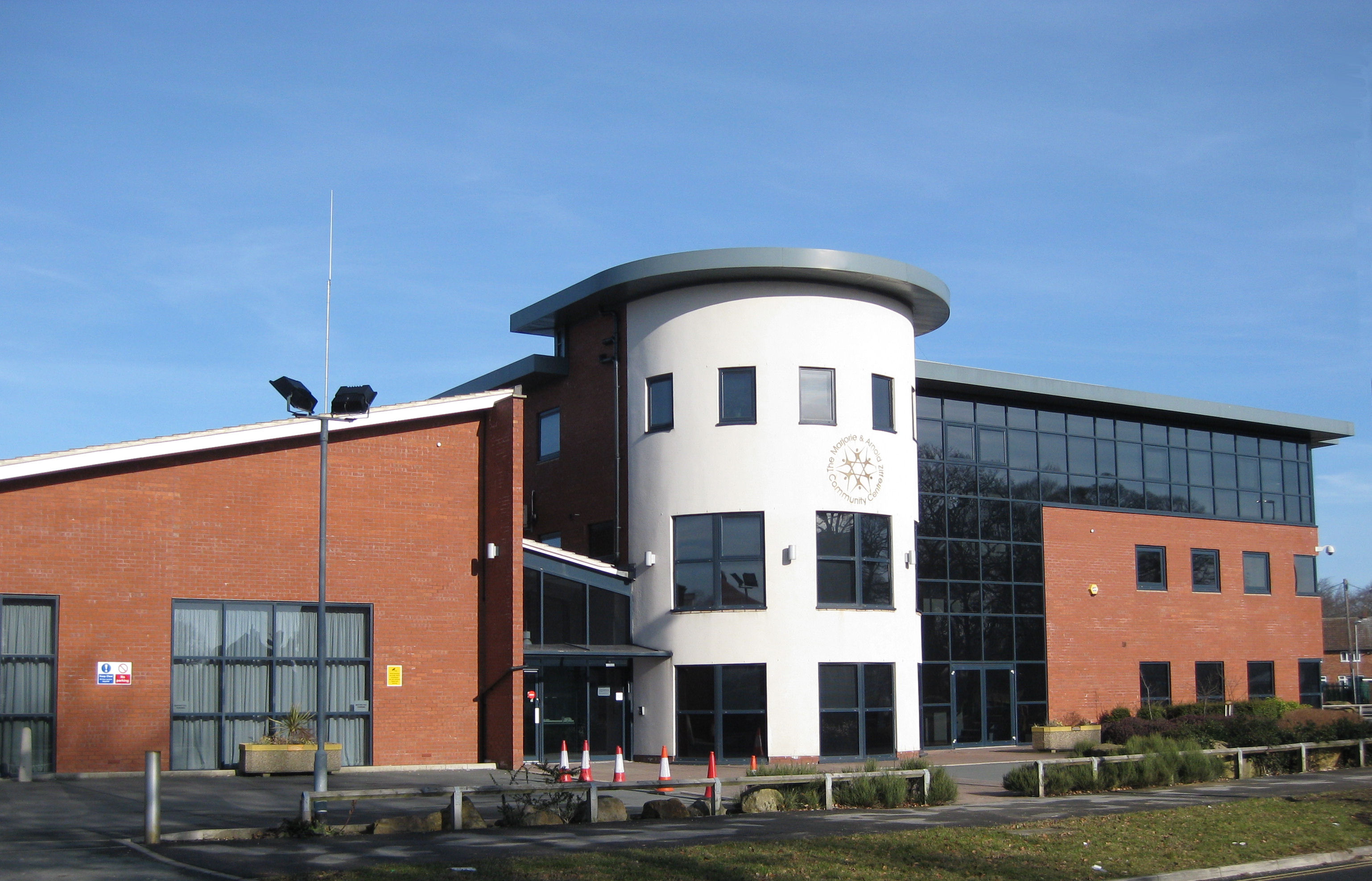
Marjorie and Arnold Ziff Community Centre

Ziff was a major sponsor of Tropical World, Roundhay Park which is now named after him. Likewise his gifts to the University of Leeds are commemorated in the Marjorie and Arnold Ziff building, which is home to student services at the university after being formally opened in 2009. He gave to Jewish welfare organizations, and is commemorated in the Marjorie and Arnold Ziff Community Centre in Moortown, Leeds. He was also a patron of the arts, and had a collection including items from his friend, Rowland Emett.
