= Moor Allerton =

Area of Leeds, England

Coordinates: 53.846°N 1.537°W

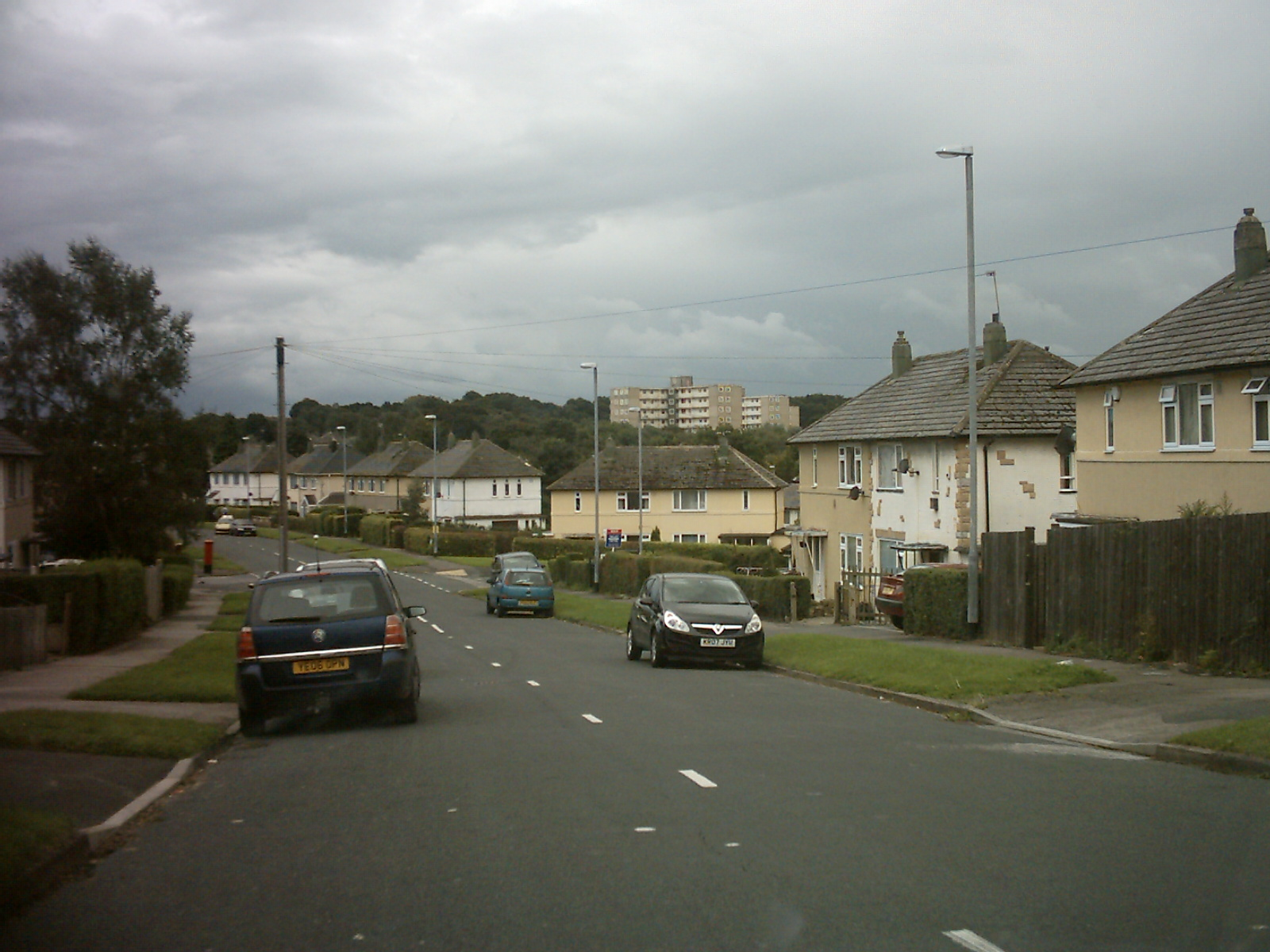
Black Moor Estate

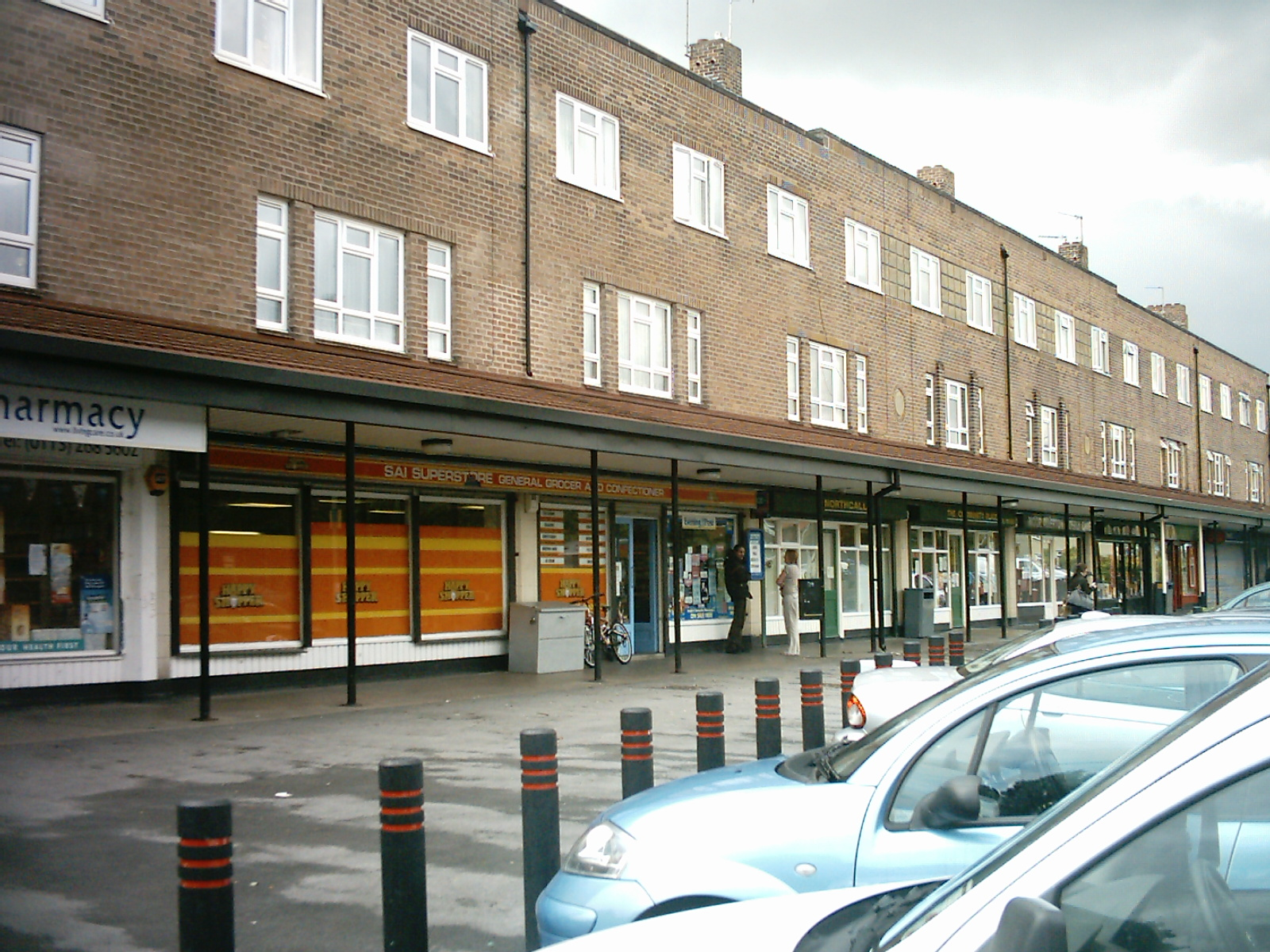
Cranmer Bank Shops on the Black Moor Estate in Moor Allerton, showing the Happy Shopper

Moor Allerton is an area of Leeds, West Yorkshire, England. The area is situated in North Leeds, near to King Lane and the Leeds Outer Ring Road.

== Description ==
The majority of Moor Allerton is situated in the Alwoodley ward of Leeds City Council and the southern part (below the Outer Ring Road) is in the Moortown ward. Both wards form part of the Leeds North East parliamentary constituency.

The area is mainly made up of 1950s/60s housing as well as a proportion of modern housing. In the 1990s much of the area's Shopping Centre was rebuilt. It now has a large Sainsbury's, a Homebase, several other retailers, a library and a public house called The Penny Fun. The earlier part of the centre was opened by Mr Arthur Craven (director of library services) on 5 March 1982. By 1985 the library had become the busiest branch library in Leeds.

Moor Allerton is situated along King Lane, on the outside of the Outer Ring Road. To the west of King Lane is the Black Moor Estate, and to the east is the Lingfield Estate. Lingfield Towers, however lies within the Outer Ring Road. Signage refers to "Lingfields & Fir Trees". The Black Moor Estate has its own amenities.

There is a parade of shops with a post office, a Happy Shopper, charity shops, a Chinese and an Indian takeaway. Moortown Social Club is situated on Cranmer Gardens.

It includes Tynwald Woods (1.3 ha) and Cranmer Bank Wood (2.34 ha), both managed by the city council and accessible from Cranmer Bank.

== Etymology ==
The name Allerton is first attested in the period 1147-82, in the forms Alretuna, Alreton and Alretona. It comes from the Old English word alor ('alder tree'), in its genitive plural form alra, and the word tūn ('farmstead, estate'). Thus it originally meant 'farmstead of the alder trees'.

Since Allerton is a common place-name in Yorkshire, the word 'moor' was added to distinguish it from places such as Chapel Allerton, the now lost Allerton Gledhow in Potter Newton, and Allerton Bywater. This appellation is first in the early thirteenth century as Mor Allteron and More Allteron. The name is occasionally attested partly in Latin form, as 'Allerton super mora' ('Allerton on the moor'), first found in 1622.

== Moor Allerton Golf Club ==
After the First World War there was a substantial Jewish population in North Leeds including some very successful businessmen. However, there was also a lot of prejudice which meant that many institutions would not admit Jews to membership. This was the case for Moortown Golf Club along with others nearby.

A consortium purchased farm land North of Nursery Lane and West of Primley Park Road. Despite the objections of Moortown Golf Club and the Residents' Association, planning permission was granted and the club opened on 27 March 1923, though initially with only 12 holes playable.

It was sometimes referred to as a Jewish Golf Course, but from the outset it was open to all as members and visitors. Its presence made it attractive as a social venue, and many houses were constructed nearby on what had been a sparsely populated area.

In the late 1960s land was purchased on Blackmoor Farm and the Nursery Lane site was sold for housing. The club opened on its present site off Coal Road, Wike, LS17, on 2 May 1971 with Eldon Griffiths, the Minister for Sport officiating. The former clubhouse on Nursery Lane was converted into a pub, The Allerton.

== Gallery ==
Images of Moor Allerton

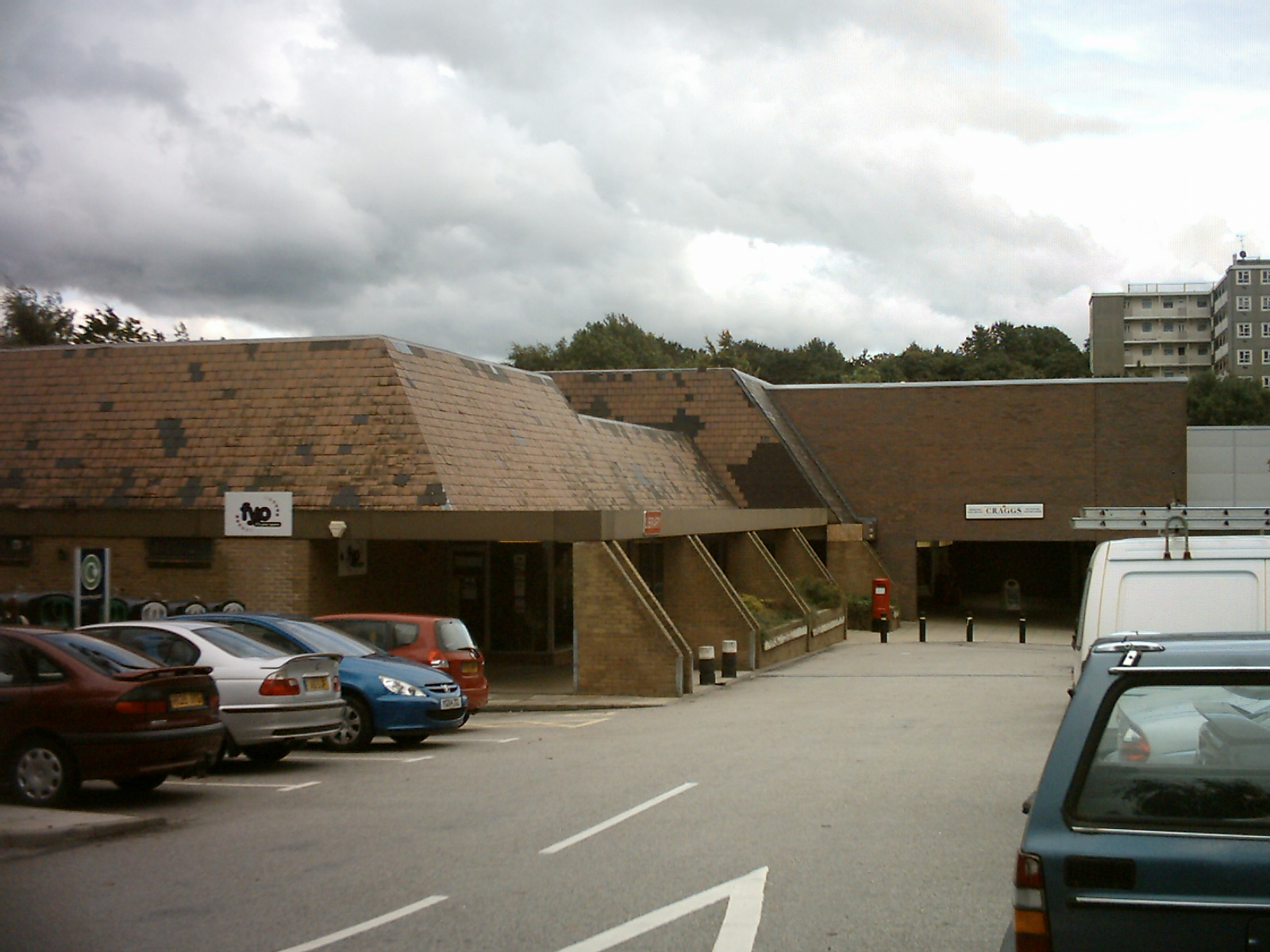
Moor Allerton Centre, showing the library

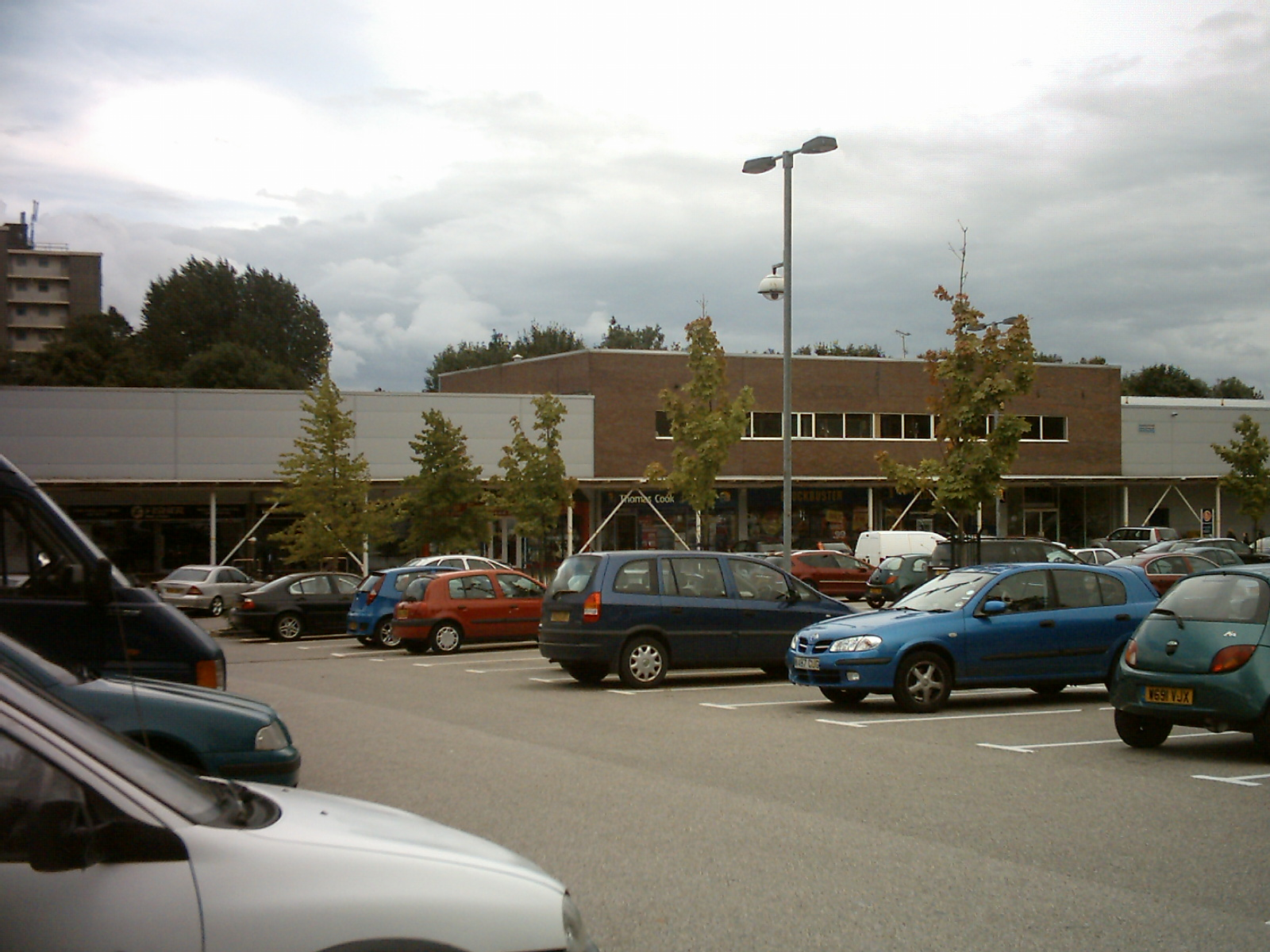
Moor Allerton Centre

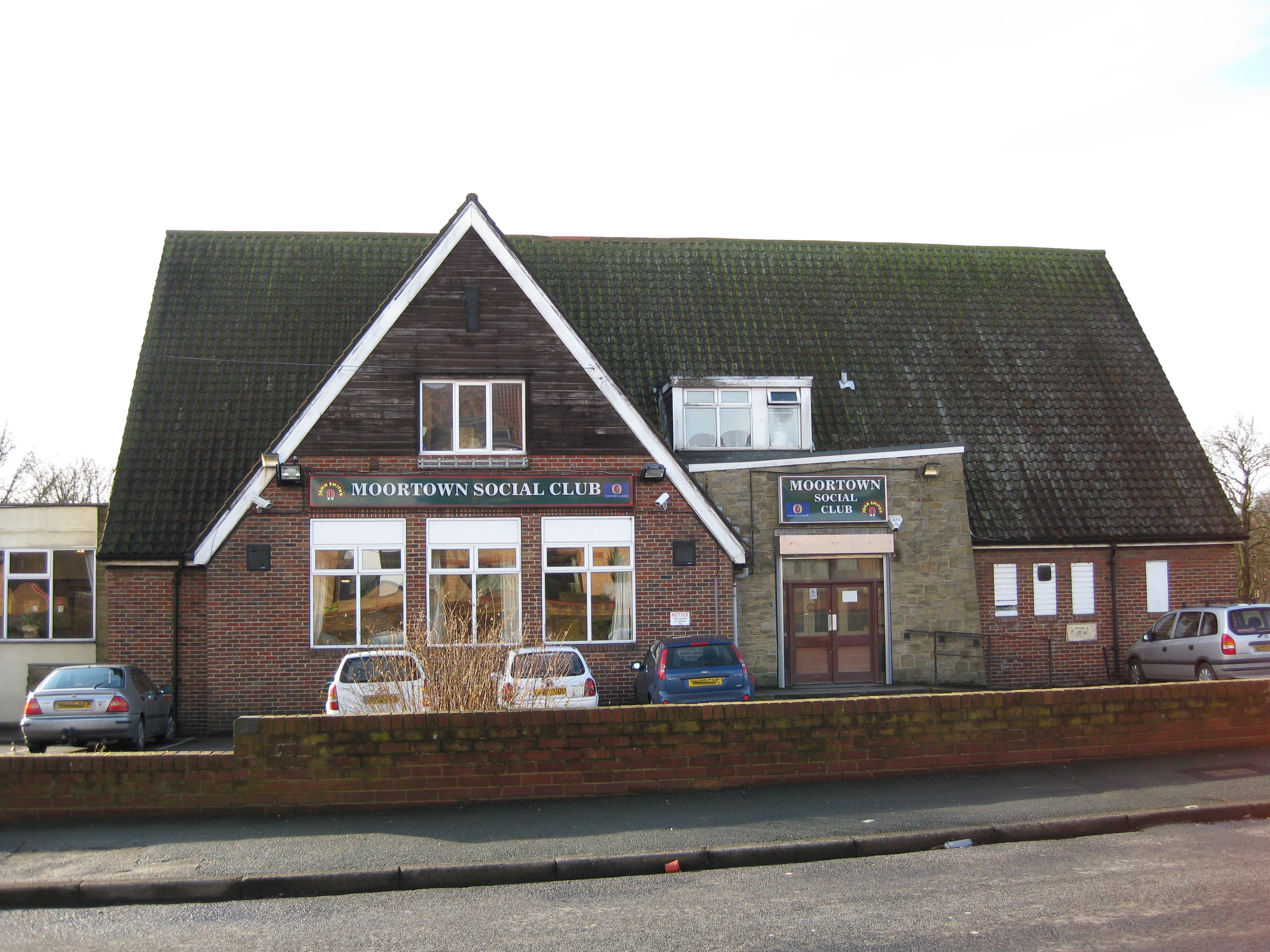
Moortown Social Club

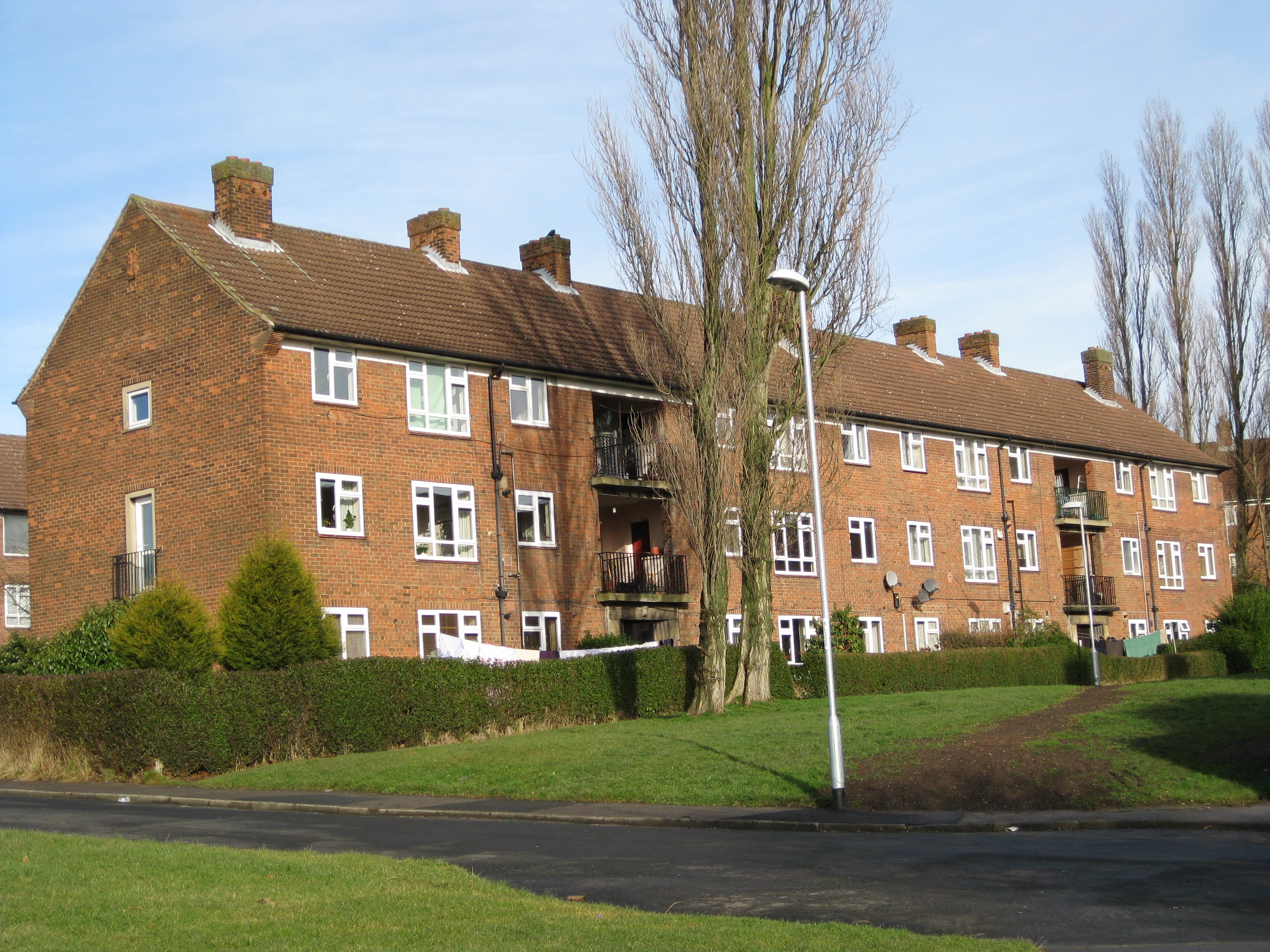
Lingfield Flats

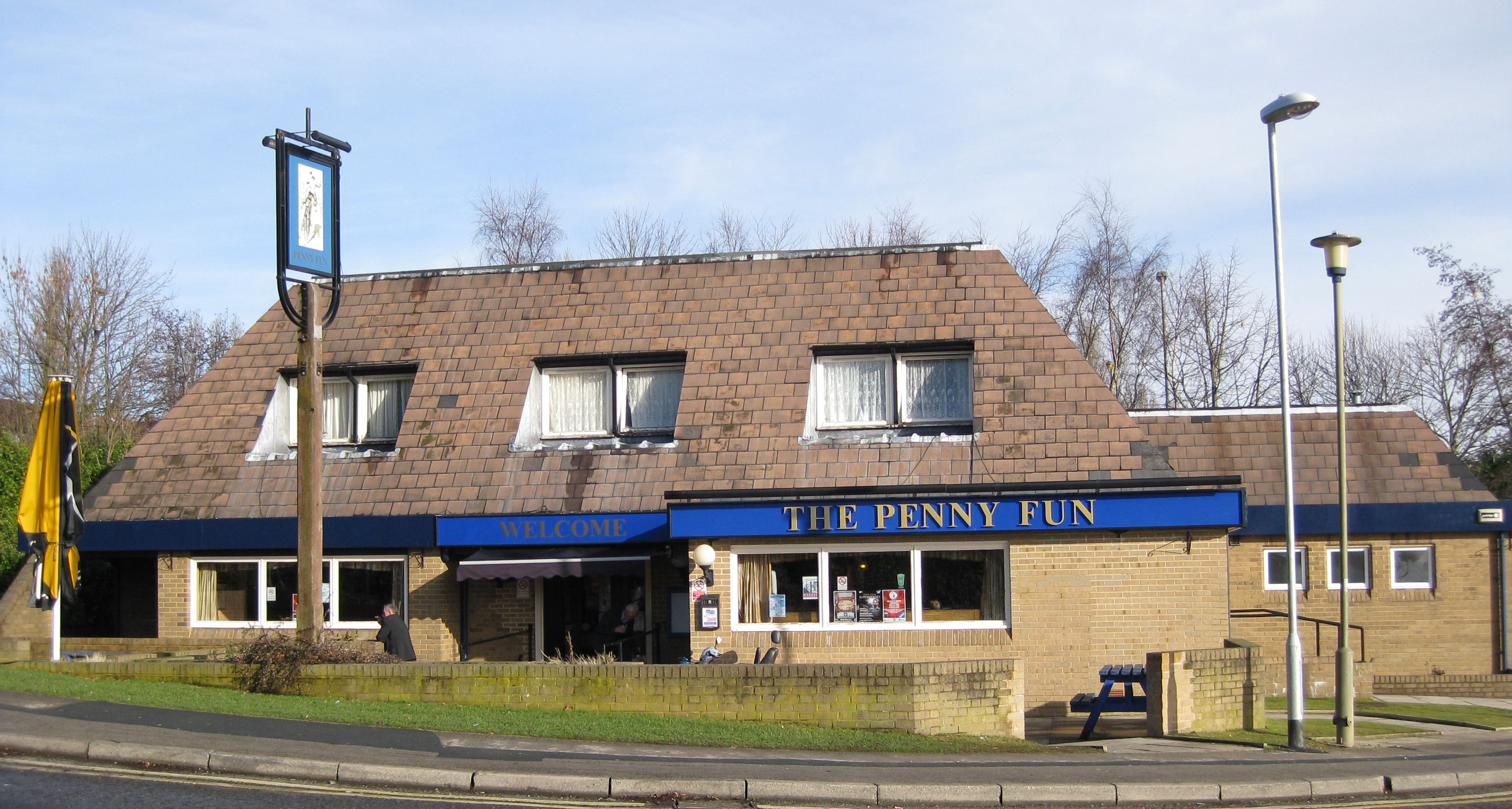
The Penny Fun

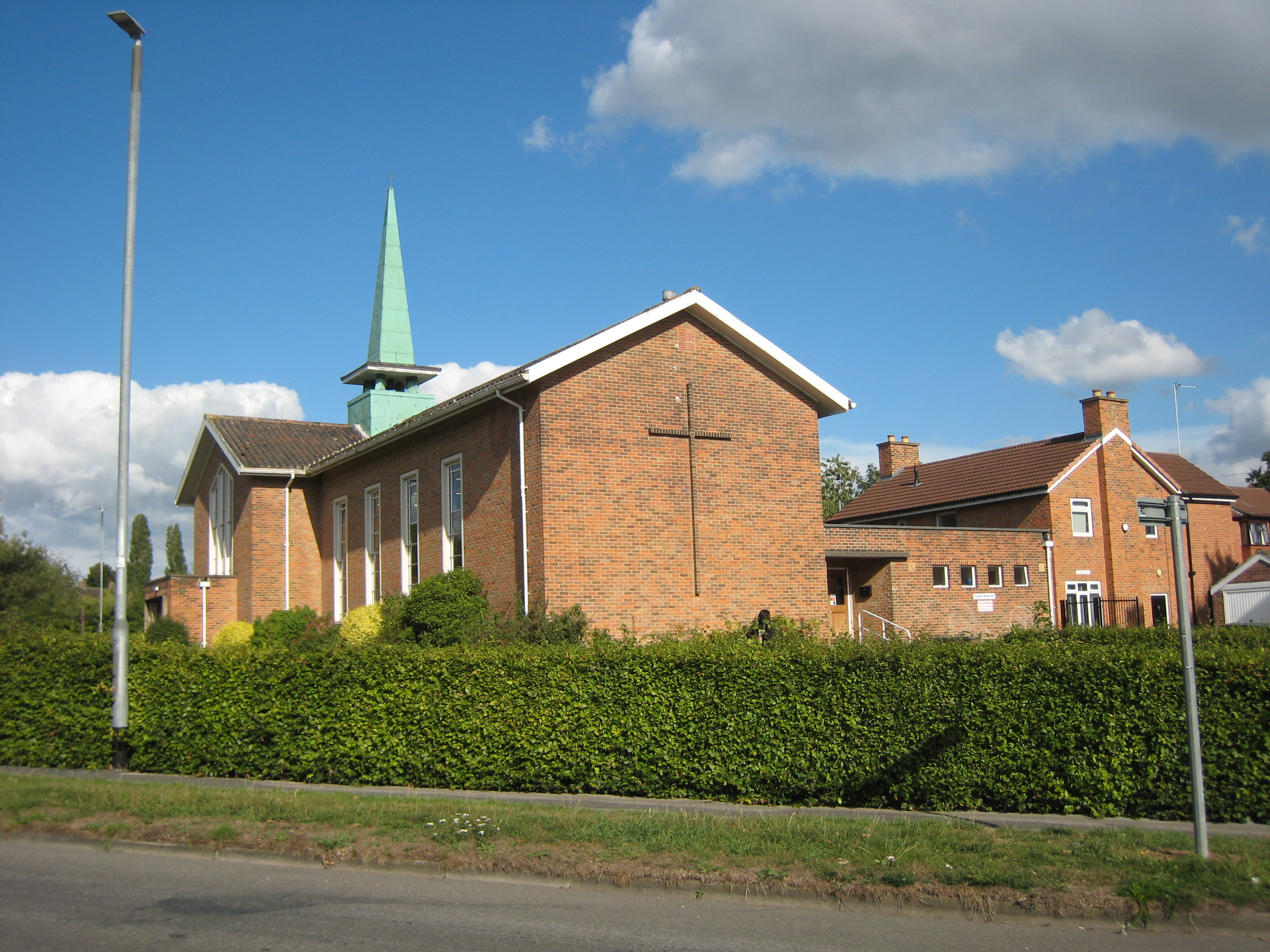
St Stephen's Church (C of E)

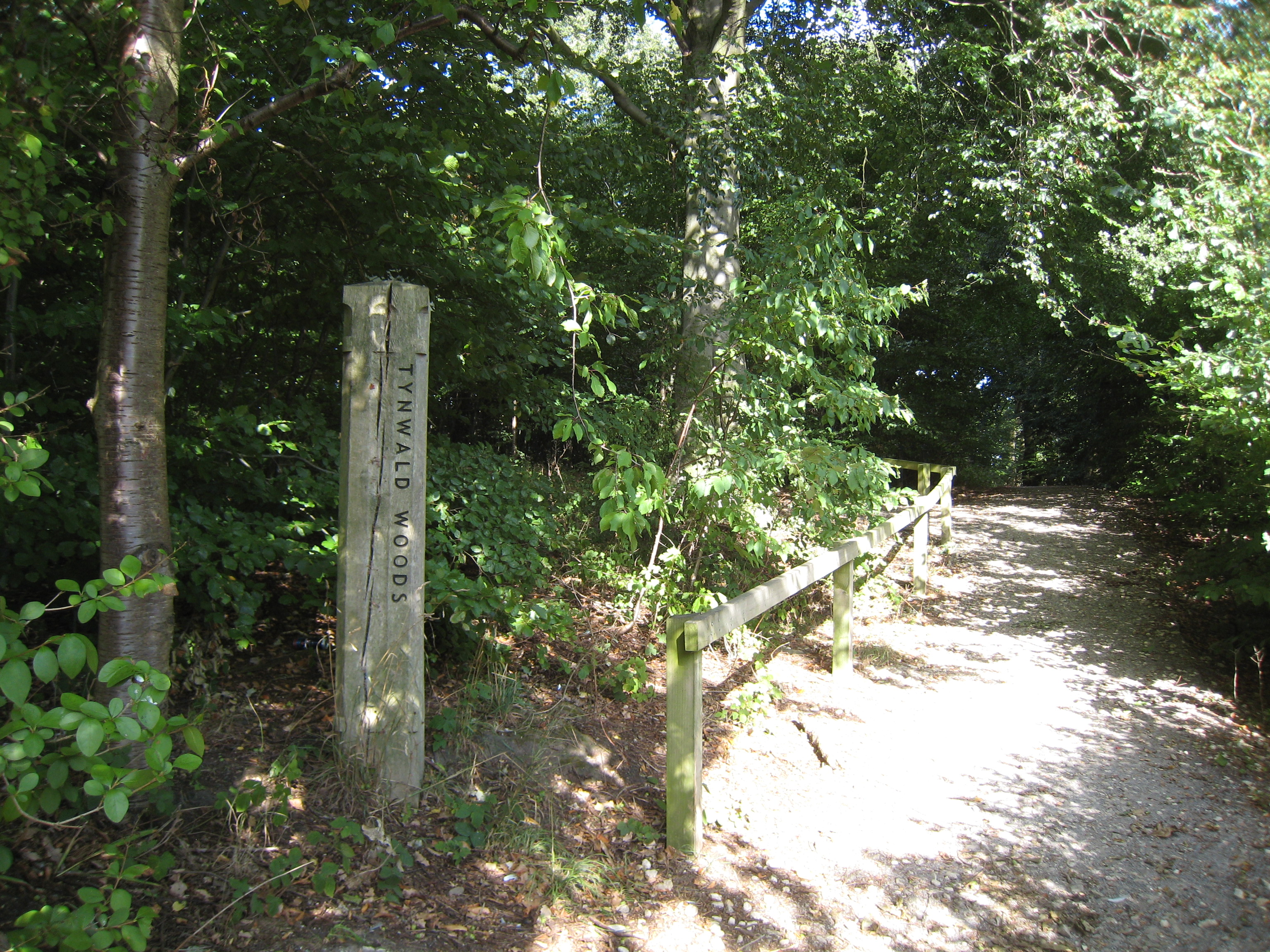
Tynwald Woods entrance

== See also ==
- Listed buildings in Leeds (Moortown Ward)
