= Tropical World (Leeds) =

Butterfly house and animal attraction in England

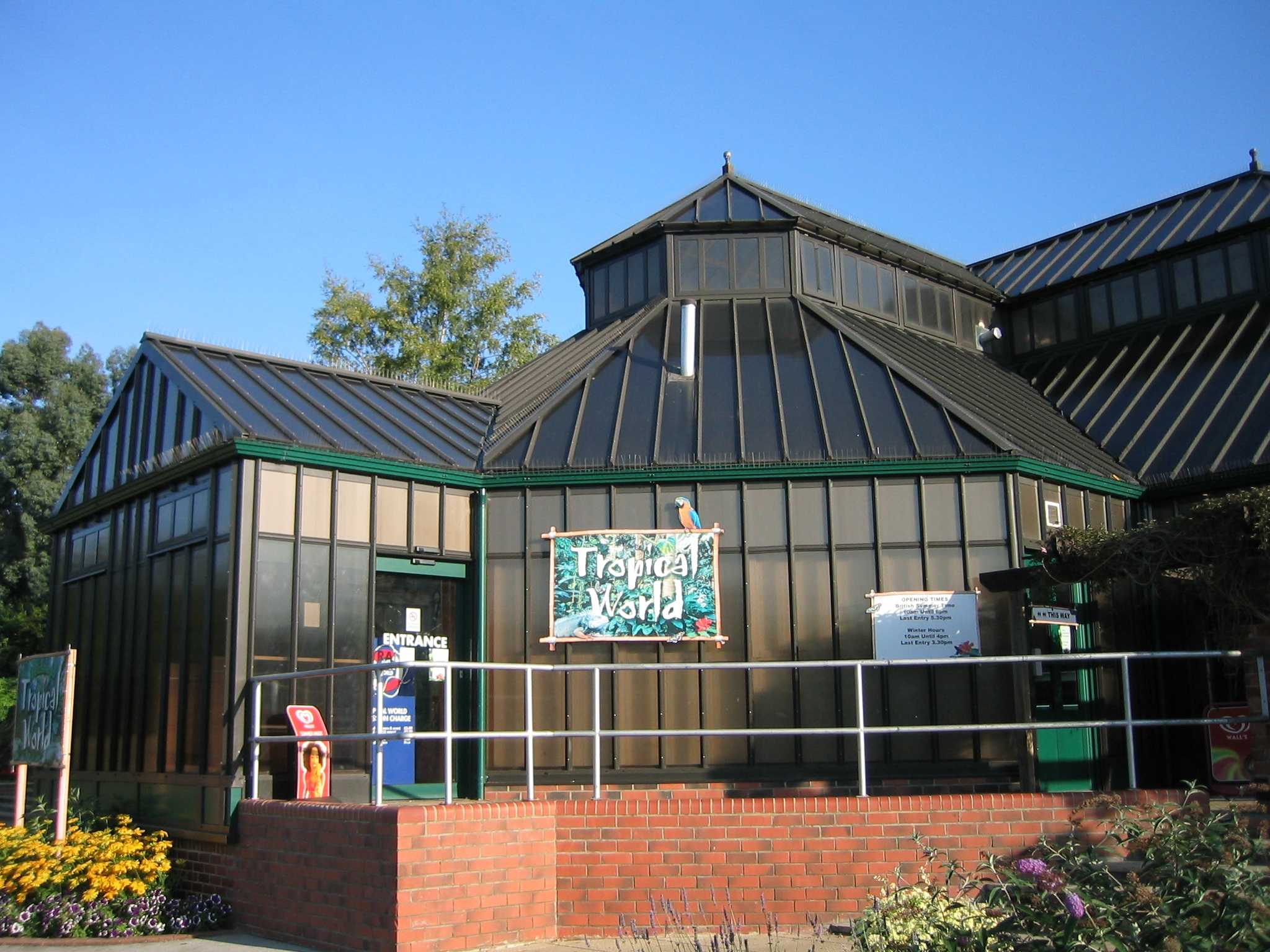
- Interactive map of Tropical World
- 53°50′26″N 1°30′17″W
- Date opened: 1988
- Location: Roundhay Park, Leeds, West Yorkshire, England
- Annual visitors: 300,000 (2019)
- Memberships: BIAZA
- Website: tropicalworld.leeds.gov.uk

Tropical World is a butterfly house and animal attraction located in Leeds, West Yorkshire, England. It is a licensed zoo with membership of BIAZA and also features the largest collection of tropical plants outside Kew Gardens.

== History ==
In 1911, a conservatory building, named the Coronation House, was built in the Canal Gardens of Roundhay Park. It was later rebuilt in 1939 and modernised to its present state in 1984. Ambitious plans to expand and revitalise it resulted in the opening of a tropical butterfly house in 1988, named Tropical World. Birds, fish, reptiles and small mammals accompanied its rare and unusual tropical plants on display.

In 2008, the attraction was renamed The Arnold and Marjorie Ziff Tropical World in honour of Arnold Ziff and his wife Marjorie who had been financial sponsors.

In 2015, Tropical World reopened following a two-year refurbishment worth £1.5 million. The aquarium section was extensively revamped in particular, complete with new species and an Aztec theme. A new cafe was also built.

== Overview ==
The attraction is composed of several climate-controlled glass houses, each replicating a tropical environment from around the world. The houses contain tropical plants and live animals, including some which roam freely, such as butterflies and turtles.

The first house visitors enter is the butterfly zone which features free-flying butterflies in a swamp-like environment. Terrapins and koi live in the various ponds and Morelet's crocodiles also occupy an enclosure. This house then leads into an Aztec-themed aquarium which features both freshwater and marine species, including poison dart frogs, axolotl, clownfish, octopus, stingrays, seahorse, red-bellied piranhas and catfish.

The following rainforest floor section is themed after the rainforest floor and features a tumbling waterfall, tropical fish, leafcutter ants, terrestrial birds and butterfly pupae. This section leads visitors to an upper-floor with reptile displays, including snakes, lizards and iguanas.

A rainforest canopy house features free-flying birds, including parrots, as well as cotton-top tamarins. It leads into a desert house featuring a mob of meerkats, tortoises and birds. The final house is a nocturnal house, featuring bats, armadillos, Malagasy giant rats, Egyptian fruit bats, pygmy slow loris, mouse lemurs and potoroos.

A cafe overlooking the Canal Gardens and a gift shop is available at the entrance.

== Gallery ==
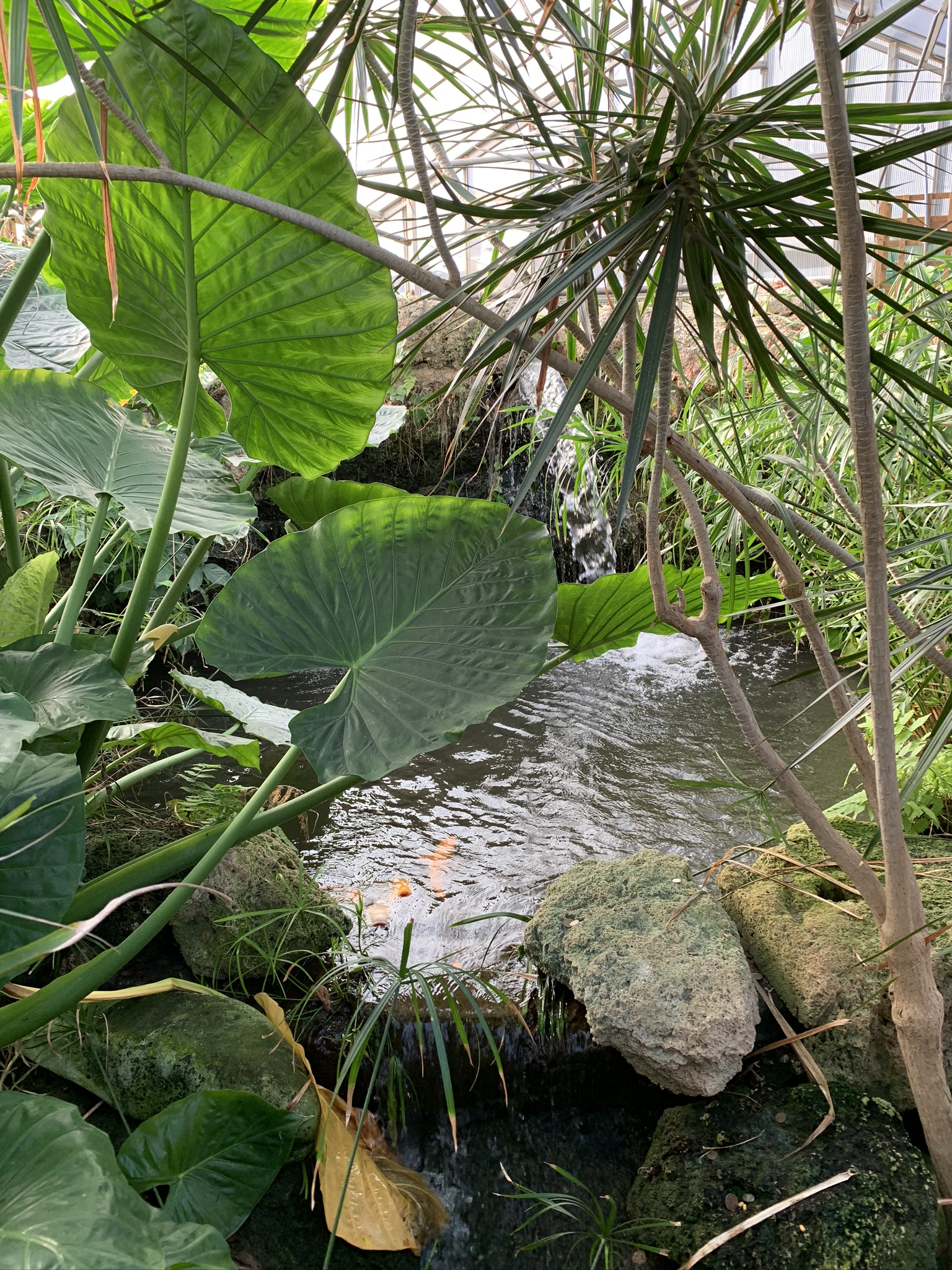
A pond within the swamp-themed butterfly house

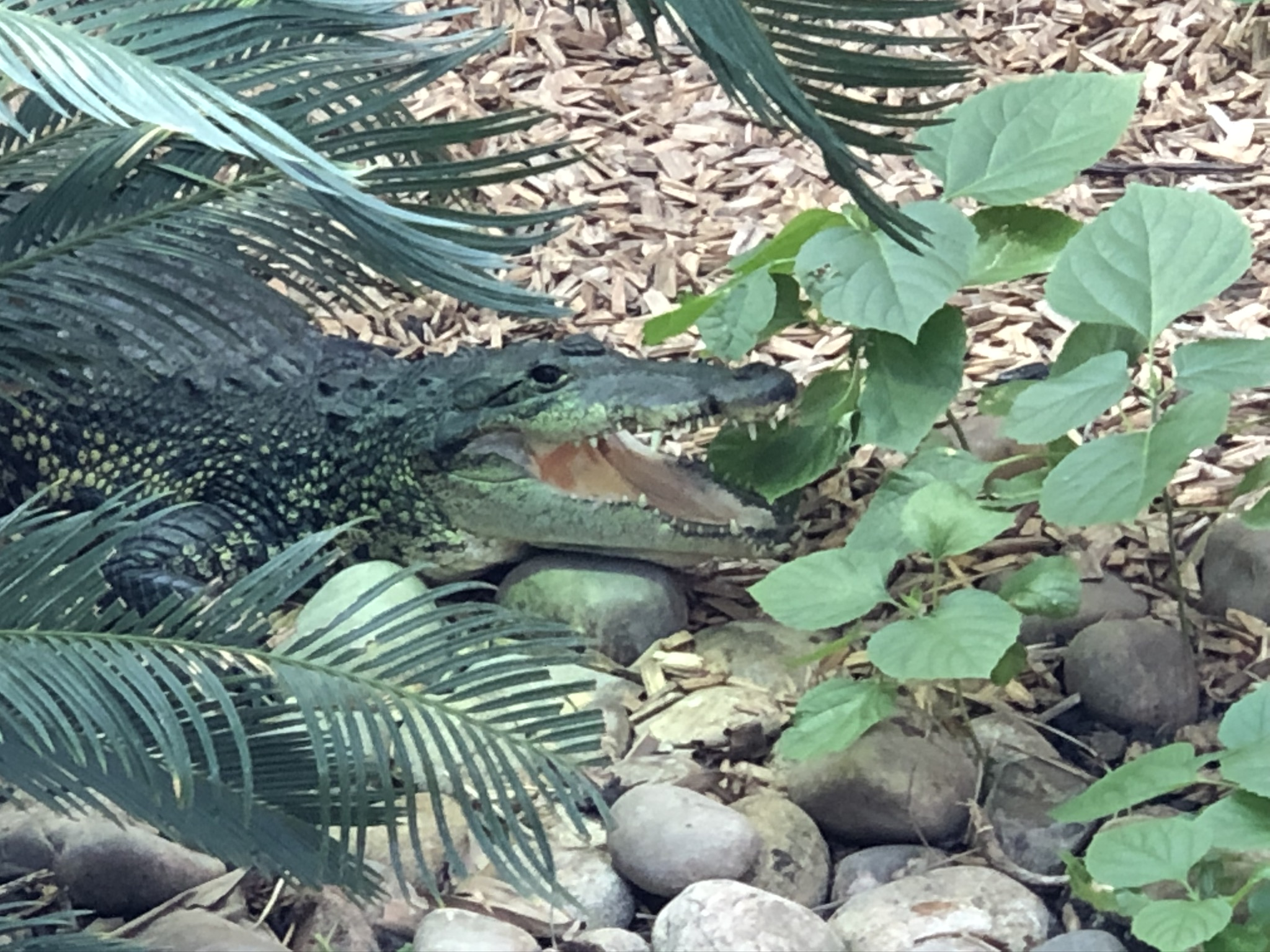
Morelet's crocodile

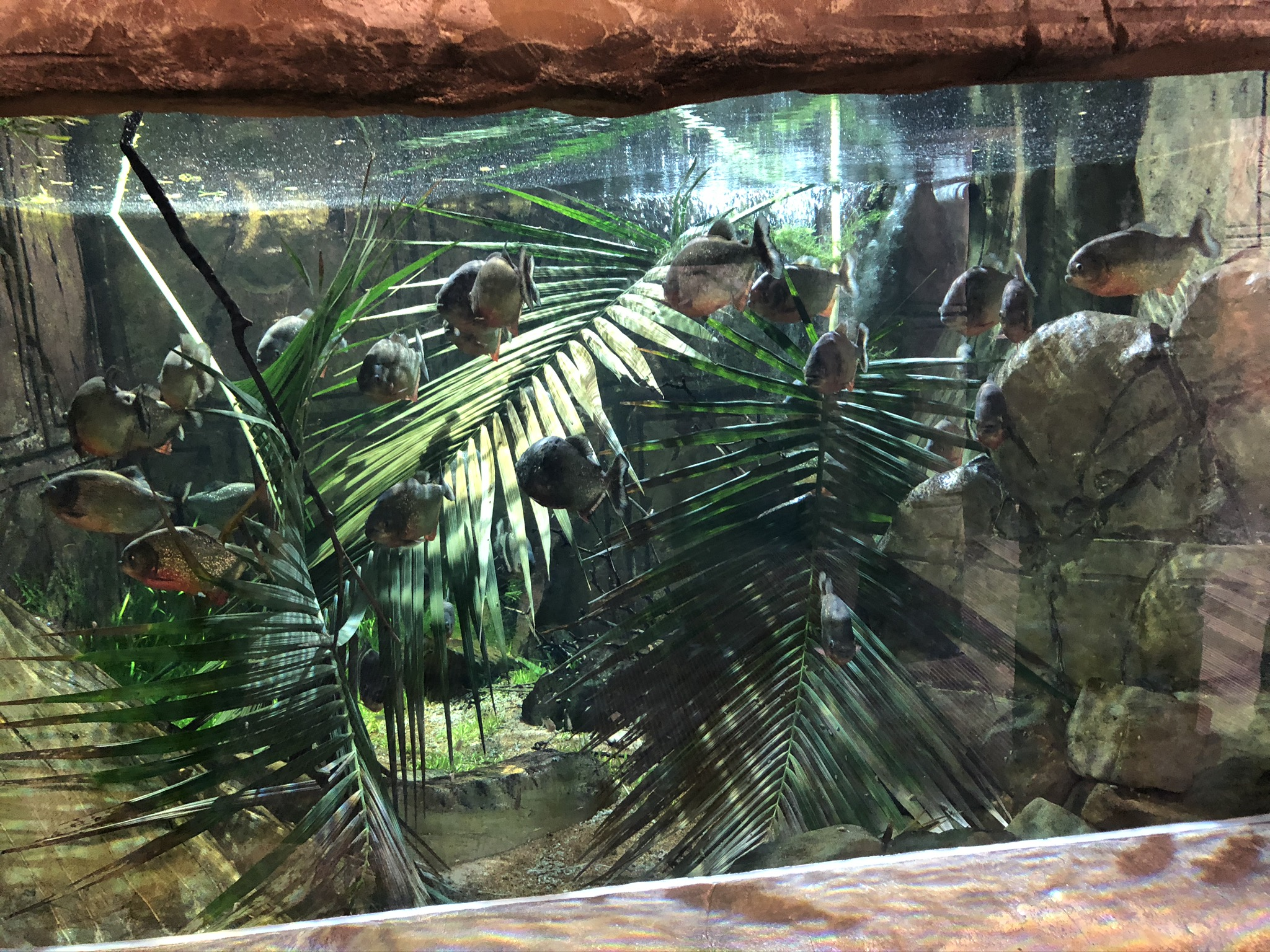
Red-bellied piranhas

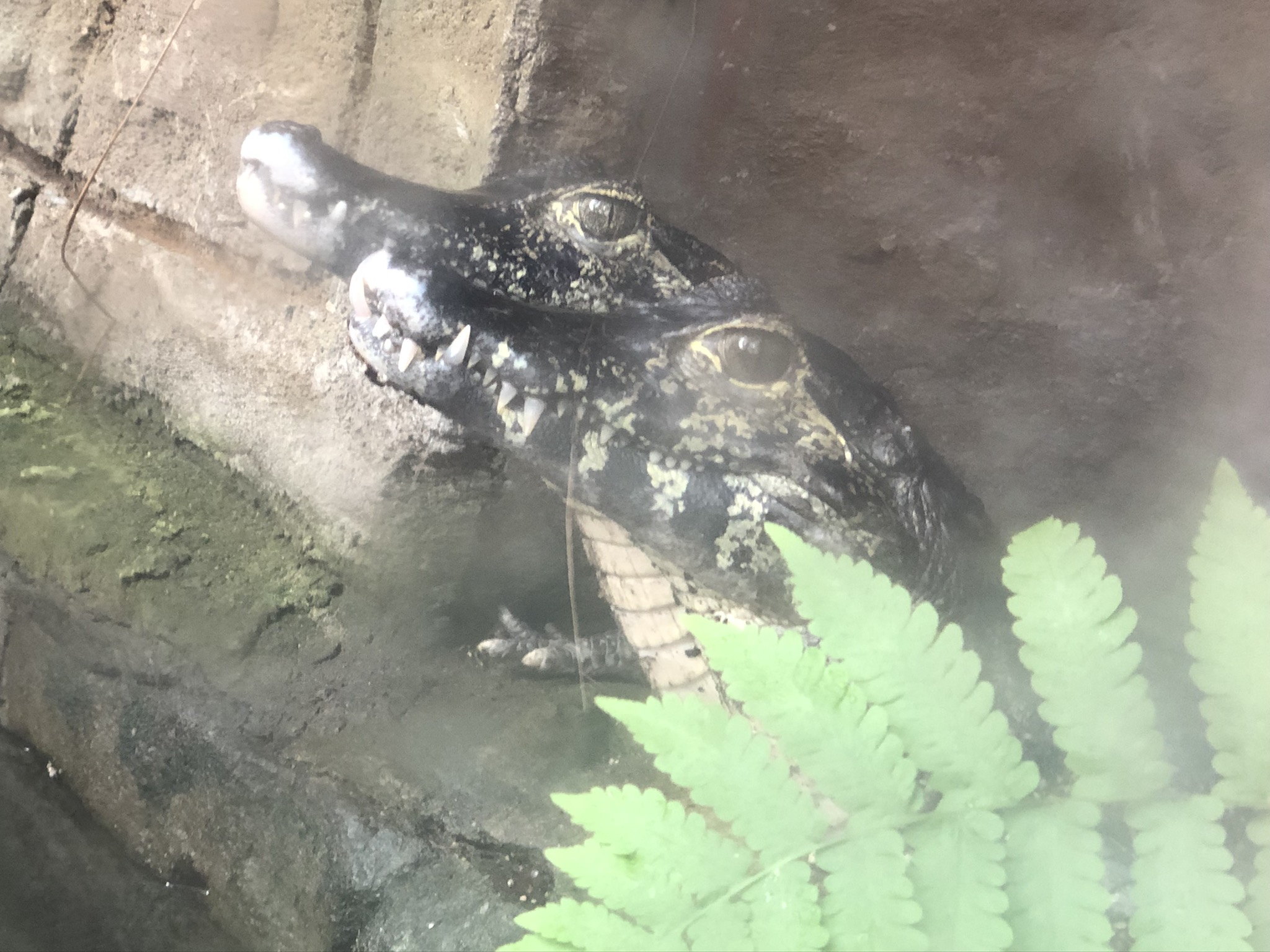
Yacare caiman

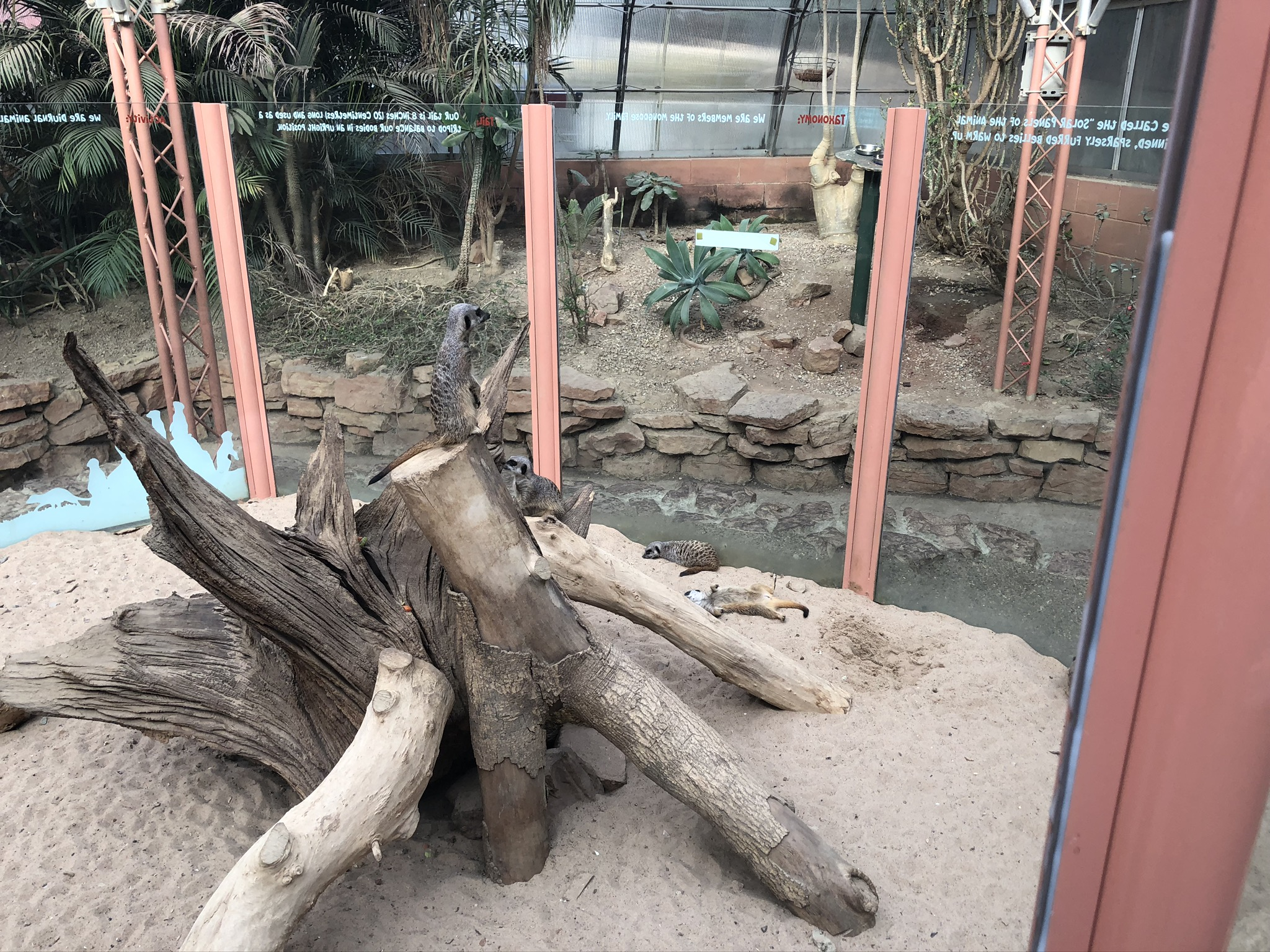
The meerkats within the desert house

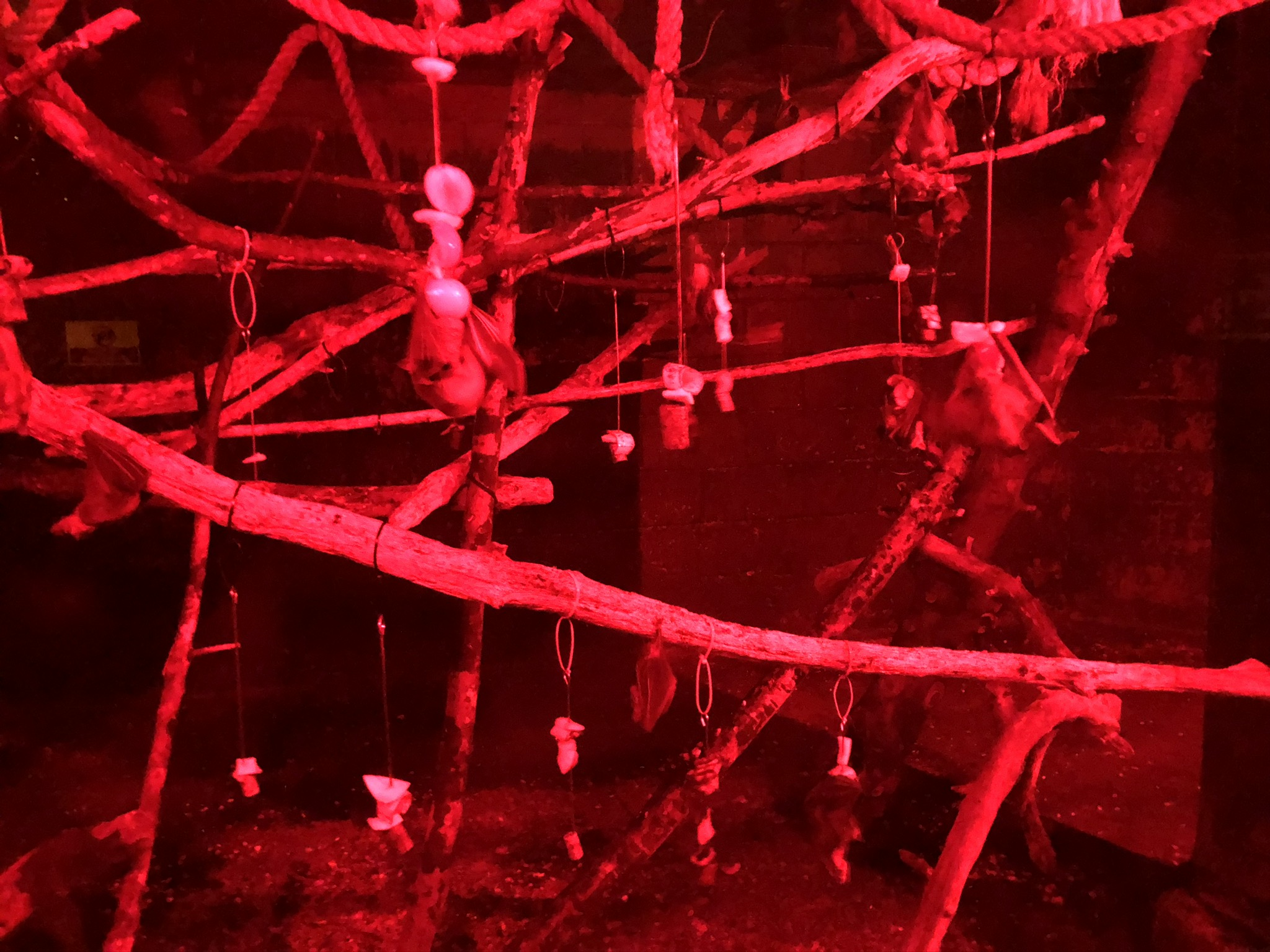
The bat enclosure within the nocturnal house
