= Leeds City Council =

Local government body in England

- Coat of arms

- Council logo

Type
- Type: Metropolitan district

Leadership
- Lord Mayor: Stephen Holroyd, Labour since 20 May 2026
- Leader: James Lewis, Labour since 24 February 2021
- Chief Executive: Ed Whiting since January 2025

Structure
- Seats: 99 councillors
- Graph of the party split among 99 seats.
- Political groups: Administration (46) Labour (46) (Note: The Labour total includes 14 Labour and Co-operative Party councillors.) Other parties (52) Conservative (15) Green (10) Reform UK (8) Liberal Democrats (6) Garforth & Swillington Ind. (3) Morley Borough Ind. (3) Social Democratic Party (SDP) (3) Independent (4) Vacant seats (1) Vacant (1)
- Joint committees: West Yorkshire Combined Authority
- Length of term: 4 years

Elections
- Voting system: Multiple member first-past-the-post
- Last election: 7 May 2026
- Next election: 6 May 2027

Meeting place
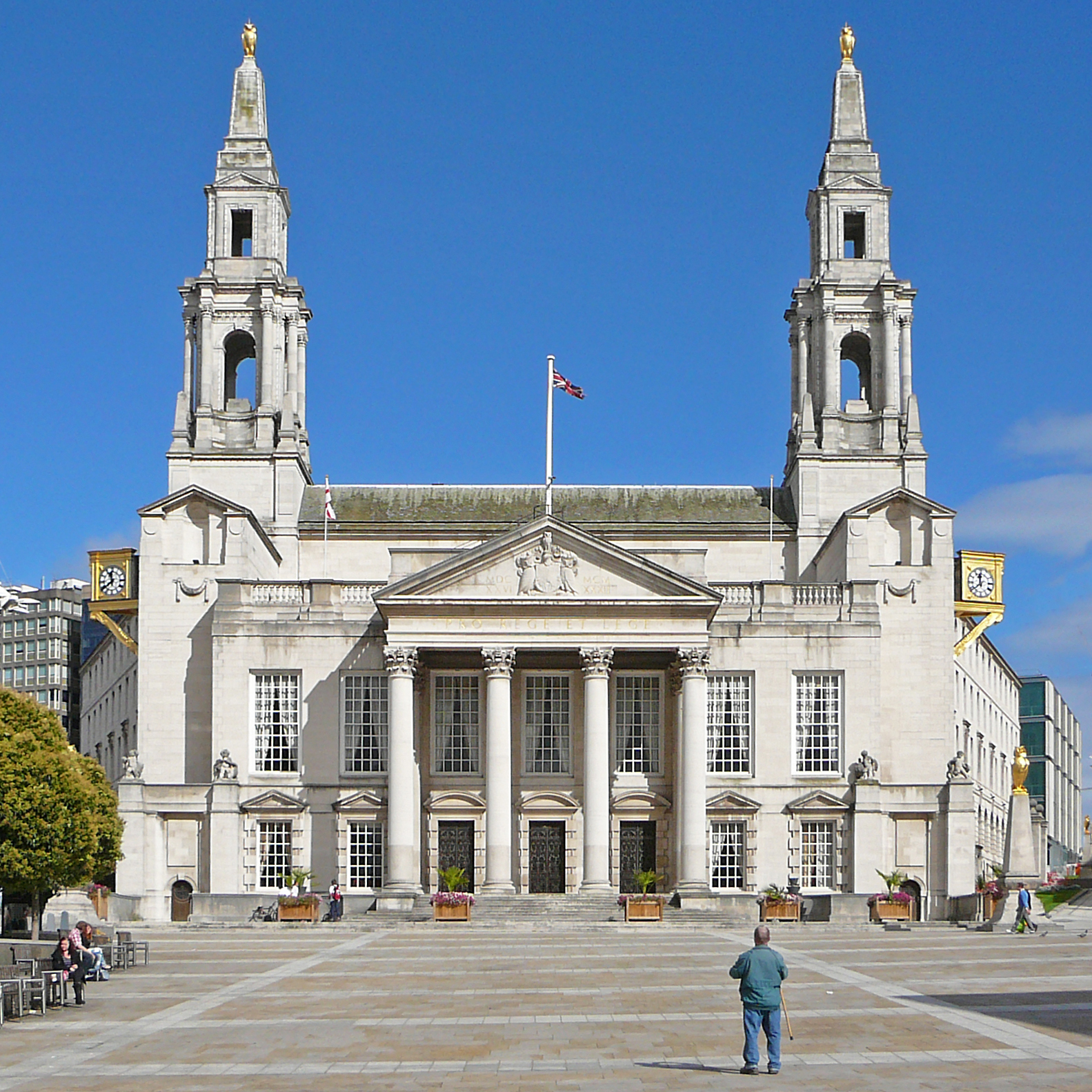
- Civic Hall, Calverley Street, Leeds, LS1 1UR

Website
- www.leeds.gov.uk

Constitution
- Constitution

Leeds City Council is the local authority of the City of Leeds in West Yorkshire, England. Leeds has had a council since 1626, which has been reformed on numerous occasions. Since 1974 it has been a metropolitan borough council. It provides the majority of local government services in the city. It is the second most populous local government district in the United Kingdom with approximately 800,000 inhabitants living within its area; only Birmingham City Council has more. Since 1 April 2014, it has been a constituent council of the West Yorkshire Combined Authority.

The council was under Labour majority control from 2011 to 2026, but has been under no overall control since the 2026 elections. It meets at Leeds Civic Hall and has its main offices at Merrion House.

== History ==
=== Leeds Corporation ===
Leeds (historically often spelt Leedes) was a manor and then a town, receiving a charter from King Charles I as a 'free borough' in 1626 giving it powers of self-government, leading to the formation of the Leeds Corporation to administer it. The leader was initially an alderman, the first holder being Sir John Savile. A second charter, granted in 1661 by Charles II, gave the town the right to appoint a mayor. The first holder of that post was Thomas Danby.

Leeds was reformed in 1836 to become a municipal borough under the Municipal Corporations Act 1835, which standardised how most boroughs were governed across England and Wales. The ruling body was then formally called the "mayor, aldermen and burgesses of the borough of Leeds", generally known as the corporation or town council. When elected county councils were created in 1889 Leeds was considered large enough to provide its own county-level services and so it became a county borough, independent from the new West Riding County Council. Leeds became a city in 1893, after which the corporation was also known as the city council. In 1897 the mayoralty was raised to a lord mayor.

=== Leeds City Council ===
The modern city council was established in 1974, with the first elections being held in advance in 1973. Under the Local Government Act 1972, the area of the County Borough of Leeds was combined with those of the Municipal Borough of Morley, the Municipal Borough of Pudsey, Aireborough Urban District, Horsforth Urban District, Otley Urban District, Garforth Urban District, Rothwell Urban District and parts of Tadcaster Rural District, Wetherby Rural District and Wharfedale Rural District from the West Riding. The new Leeds district was one of five metropolitan districts in West Yorkshire. Leeds' borough and city statuses and right to appoint a lord mayor were transferred to the enlarged district.

From 1974 until 1986 the city council was a second-tier authority, with West Yorkshire County Council providing many key services. However, the metropolitan county councils were abolished under the Local Government Act 1985 and the council took responsibility for all former County Council functions. Some functions, notably policing, fire services and public transport are run by joint committees of the five metropolitan boroughs in West Yorkshire.

Since 2014 the council has been a constituent member of the West Yorkshire Combined Authority. The combined authority has been led by the directly elected Mayor of West Yorkshire since 2021.

== Council services ==
Leeds City Council is responsible for providing all statutory local authority services in Leeds, except for those it provides jointly in conjunction with other West Yorkshire authorities. This includes education, housing, planning, transport and highways, social services, libraries, leisure and recreation, waste collection, waste disposal, environmental health and revenue collection. The council is one of the largest employers in West Yorkshire, with around 33,000 employees.

=== Education Leeds ===
Education Leeds was set up in 2001 as a non-profit making company wholly owned by Leeds City Council to provide education support services for the council. For its first five years it operated as a public-private partnership between the Council and Capita. The senior councillors of the council's executive board voted in March 2010 to stop using Education Leeds to provide services from 31 March 2011, thereby effectively causing it to cease operation.

=== Housing ===
Until 1 October 2013, Leeds City Council's housing stock was managed and operated by three arms-length management organisations (ALMOs) since 2007. They were wholly owned by the council but operated as autonomous and self-governing organisations. The ALMOs, which are arranged on a regional basis were:

- East North East Homes
- West North West Homes
- Aire Valley Homes

As of 1 October 2013, the ALMOs returned to Leeds City Council and all management of council housing stock became the responsibility of Housing Leeds. At this point, the ALMOs ceased to exist.

Management of more than 2000 homes in Belle Isle is carried out by Belle Isle Tenant Management Organisation, the largest tenant management organisation in the UK outside London.

=== Leeds Museums and Galleries ===
Leeds Museums & Galleries is a museum service run by Leeds City Council.

Established in 1821, it is the largest local authority-run museum service in England, with one of the larger and more significant multidisciplinary collections in the UK, looking after 1.3 million objects. The service is run and primarily funded by Leeds City Council (LCC), and plays a significant role in shaping the cultural life of the city, but as a leading museum service it has a regional and national reputation and role. In 2012 the organisation achieved Major Partner Museum status from Arts Council England, which brought significant additional funding and further national prominence and expectation.

The service has at times run major events across the city, with visitors numbering in the millions, such as the 2014–19 Legacies of War Project, which examined how Leeds was affected by the First World War, and developed teaching materials for schools.

Leeds Museums & Galleries is made up of nine different sites: Leeds Art Gallery, Leeds City Museum, Kirkstall Abbey, Abbey House Museum, Leeds Industrial Museum at Armley Mills, Thwaite Mills, Lotherton Hall, Temple Newsam and Leeds Discovery Centre.

=== Waste disposal and recycling ===
The city operates waste disposal and recycling facilities in Kirkstall, Meanwood, Middleton, Otley, Pudsey, Seacroft, Wetherby (Thorp Arch) and Yeadon.

=== West Yorkshire Joint Services ===
West Yorkshire Joint Services provides services for the five district local authorities in West Yorkshire (Leeds, Bradford, Calderdale, Kirklees and Wakefield) in the areas of archaeology, archives, ecology, materials testing, public analyst, and trading standards.

== Council structures ==
=== Overview and scrutiny ===
The executive and workings of the council are overseen by six scrutiny boards. These panels involve councillors from all parties and some independent members. Scrutiny boards are able to review decisions taken by the executive or by officers of the council and to refer them for further consideration.

=== Regulatory ===
The licensing committee of the council is drawn from councillors from all parties and is responsible for entertainment, refreshment, personal and premises licences established under the Licensing Act 2003. Three plans panels are responsible for determining planning applications which have not been delegated to officers for decision, such as large or controversial applications or those in which a councillor or officer has a personal interest.

=== Community committees ===
Ten community committees are responsible for managing certain area-specific budgets and responsibilities, such as community centres and CCTV, in partnership with local communities. Five of the community committees cover areas in "inner Leeds" and five cover areas in "outer Leeds". These committees also exert considerable influence over other areas of local interest such as street-cleansing and community policing.

== Lord Mayor of Leeds ==
The Lord Mayor of Leeds is a ceremonial, non-partisan position elected annually by and from the councillors. As well as acting as the chair of the council, the Lord Mayor represents the City of Leeds at events within and outside the city.

The first Mayor of Leeds was Thomas Danby in 1661, and the first Lord Mayor was James Kitson in 1897. The current Lord Mayor is Stephen Holroyd.

During the mayoral year, the Lord Mayor's Charity Appeal raises funds for one or more charities of the mayor's choice.

== Leadership ==
The council operates a Leader and Cabinet executive as defined under Section 11 of the Local Government Act 2000. The executive board of the council currently consists of nine executive members with portfolio responsibilities from the ruling Labour group, and the leader of the biggest opposition group (Conservative).

Since February 2021, the Leader of the council has been James Lewis (Labour). He succeeded Judith Blake, the first woman ever to lead the council.

Current council leadership
Portfolio	Councillor (electoral ward)	Term
Ceremonial leadership
The 132nd Lord Mayor of Leeds (2026–2027); First citizen of the City of Leeds	Stephen Holroyd (Ardsley and Robin Hood)	2026–present
Vice-chair of the council	Jane Dowson (Chapel Allerton)	2026–present
Executive leadership
Leader of the Council; Leader of the Labour Group	James Lewis (Kippax and Methley)	2021–present
Deputy Leader of the Council; Executive Member for the Economy	Salma Arif (Gipton and Harehills)	2026–present
Deputy Leader of the Council; Executive Member for Communities	Mary Harland (Kippax and Methley)	2026–present
Executive Member for Resources	Mohammed Rafique (Chapel Allerton)	2026–present
Executive Member for Transport and Planning	Tom Hinchcliffe (Bramley and Stanningley)	2026–present
Executive Member for Equalities, Adults and Health	Emma Flint (Weetwood)	2025–present
Executive Member for Housing and Hubs	Asghar Khan (Burmantofts and Richmond Hill)	2026–present
Executive Member for Environment	James Gibson (Cross Gates and Whinmoor)	2026–present
Executive Member for Children and Families	Helen Hayden (Temple Newsam)	2021–present
Chief Whip of the Council	Luke Farley (Burmantofts and Richmond Hill)	2025–present
Opposition leadership
Leader of the Opposition; Leader of the Conservative Group	Alan Lamb (Wetherby)	2023–present
Leader of the Green Group	Penny Stables (Wetherby)	2024–present
Leader of the Liberal Democrat Group	Stewart Golton (Rothwell)	2010–present
Leader of the Morley Borough Independents Group	Simon Brown (Morley North)	2026–present
Leader of the Garforth and Swillington Independents Group	Mark Dobson (Garforth and Swillington)	2017–present
Leader of the SDP Group	Wayne Dixon (Middleton Park)	2023–present
Leader of the Reform UK Group	Ryan Taylor (Morley South)	2026–present

=== Leaders and political control since 1945 ===
City of Leeds (County Borough) Council until 31 March 1974
Leader	Years	Political Control
Unknown	1945–1947	Labour
Unknown	1947–1949	Conservative
Unknown	1949–1951	Labour
Unknown	1951–1952	Conservative
Unknown	1952–1967	Labour
Frank Marshall	1967–1972	Conservative
Albert King	1972–1974	No Overall Control: Labour minority administration
Leeds Metropolitan District Council from 1 April 1974 under the Local Government Act 1972
Leader	Years	Political Control
Albert King	1974–1975	No Overall Control: Labour minority, then Conservative minority
Irwin Bellow	1975–1976	No Overall Control: Labour minority, then Conservative minority
Irwin Bellow	1976–1979	Conservative
Peter Sparling	1979–1980	No Overall Control: Conservative minority
George Mudie	1980–1989	Labour
Jon Trickett	1989–1996	Labour
Brian Walker	1996–2003	Labour
Keith Wakefield	2003–2004	Labour
Andrew Carter (Joint Leader)	2004–November 2007 (Note: Under the terms of the coalition agreement between the Liberal Democrats and Conservatives from May 2004, the full-time post of Leader of the Council swapped between the leaders of the two parties' council groupings every six months: Mark Harris (Liberal Democrats) from 28 June to 30 November 2004, 24 May to 30 November 2005, 23 May to 30 November 2006, 24 May to 30 November 2007, and; Andrew Carter (Conservatives) from 1 December 2004 to 23 May 2005, 1 December 2005 to 22 May 2006, 1 December 2006 to 24 May 2007.)	No Overall Control: Liberal Democrat and Conservative coalition, then Labour minority
Mark Harris (Joint Leader)	2004–November 2007	No Overall Control: Liberal Democrat and Conservative coalition, then Labour minority
Andrew Carter (Joint Leader)		No Overall Control: Liberal Democrat and Conservative coalition, then Labour minority
Andrew Carter (Joint Leader)	December 2007–2010 (Note: Richard Brett was elected as the new Leader of the Liberal Democrats on Leeds City Council after Harris stepped down on 30 November 2007. Under the terms of the coalition agreement between the Liberal Democrats and Conservatives from May 2004, the full-time post of Leader of the Council swapped between the leaders of the two parties' council groupings every six months: Andrew Carter (Conservatives) from 1 December 2007 to 22 May 2008, 1 December 2008 to 21 May 2009, 1 December 2009 to 27 May 2010, and; Brett (Liberal Democrats) from 22 May to 30 November 2008, 21 May to 30 November 2009.)	No Overall Control: Liberal Democrat and Conservative coalition, then Labour minority
Richard Brett (Joint Leader)	December 2007–2010	No Overall Control: Liberal Democrat and Conservative coalition, then Labour minority
Keith Wakefield	2010–2011	No Overall Control: Liberal Democrat and Conservative coalition, then Labour minority
Keith Wakefield	2011–2015	Labour
Judith Blake	2015–2021	Labour
James Lewis	2021–2026	Labour
James Lewis	2026–present	No Overall Control: Labour minority

=== Elected Mayor ===
On 3 May 2012 a referendum was held to determine whether or not to replace the current leadership arrangements with a directly elected mayor.

The question that was asked in the referendum was set by central government, and was:

How would you like Leeds City Council to be run?
- By a leader who is an elected councillor chosen by a vote of the other elected councillors. This is how the council is run now.
Or
- By a mayor who is elected by voters. This would be a change from how the council is run now.

The proposal for an elected mayor was opposed by the leaders of the four largest groups on the council. It was supported by Leeds Conservative MPs Stuart Andrew (Pudsey) and Alec Shelbrooke (Elmet and Rothwell).

The referendum results showed a rejection of the proposal for a directly elected mayor, with 63% (107,910) voting to keep the status quo.

== Political composition ==
The council is composed of 99 councillors, three for each of the city's electoral wards.

One councillor for each ward – a third of all of the total councillors – is elected at every council election, which are held in three of every four years. Each councillor is also elected to serve a four-year term. This only differs following a boundary review, where all council seats must be re-elected. The most recent full council elections were in 1980, 2004 and 2018. The latter election saw all three ward council seats up for re-election, with each of the three successful candidates in each ward awarded a unique one, two or four-year term respectively with longer terms given to the candidates with the highest number of votes.

Between the 2004 and 2011 elections, the council's political composition meant no one party had a full majority and therefore there was no overall control. During this time, a coalition administration between the Conservatives and Liberal Democrats was formally agreed. Throughout the coalition, both parties' Group Leaders jointly shared the office of Leader of the council, each holding it for six months in turn. However, in 2010, the Labour Group regained control as a minority administration with the support of the two Green Party councillors.

From the 2011 council election until 2026, the council was run by a Labour majority administration. In 2026 Labour lost its majority, while remaining the largest group on the council.

Year	Labour	Liberal Democrats	Conservative	Others
2026	48	6	14	31
2024	61	6	15	17
2023	61	6	18	14
2022	58	7	21	13
2021	54	8	24	13
2019	57	8	23	11
2018	61	6	22	10
2016	63	9	19	8
2015	63	9	19	8
2014	63	9	18	9
2012	63	10	19	7
2011	55	16	21	7
2010	48	21	22	8
2008	43	24	22	10
2007	43	24	22	10
2006	40	26	24	9
2004	40	26	24	9
2003	52	22	20	5
2002	57	20	18	4
2000	61	19	16	3
1999	71	14	12	2
1998	80	9	9	1

== Electoral wards ==
Leeds City Council's 33 electoral wards have been fully reviewed twice since the year 2000, once before the 2004 council election and again before the 2018 council election.

Beforehand, the ward boundaries had not been amended since the last review in 1979. The 1979 review increased the number of wards in Leeds from 32 to 33, thereby increasing the number of councillors from 96 to 99. The 1980 council election was the first to be contested based on the new ward boundaries across the city, and therefore it was a full council, all-out election where all of the 99 council seats were up for election.

The boundary review between February 2002 and July 2003 was completed by the Boundary Committee for England. The review recommended the retention of 99 councillors representing 33 wards across the city, but suggested substantial alterations to ward boundaries to reduce the level of variance between different wards. Prior to the boundary review, based on the 2001 electorate, the largest and smallest wards respectively were Morley South (22,167 electors) and Hunslet (10,955 electors). Following the review all wards had an electorate within 10% of the average of all 33 wards across the city.

A similar process was completed in November 2017 by the Boundary Committee's successor, the Local Government Boundary Commission for England. The process had held consultations since July 2016. The biggest ward boundary changes saw the creation of two new wards in Headingley & Hyde Park and Little London and Woodhouse from the previous Hyde Park & Woodhouse and Headingley wards. City & Hunslet also became Hunslet & Riverside. Following the example of previous reviews, all of the city's councillors were re-elected together again based on the new ward boundaries in May 2018.

Parliamentary constituency	Ward	Councillor	First elected	Term of office
Leeds Central and Headingley	Headingley and Hyde Park	Tim Goodall (GPEW)	2024	2024–2028
Leeds Central and Headingley	Headingley and Hyde Park	Abdul Hannan (Lab)	2023	2023–2027
Leeds Central and Headingley	Headingley and Hyde Park	Nilesh Chohan (GPEW)	2026	2026–2030
Leeds Central and Headingley	Kirkstall	Joe Ingham (GPEW)	2026	2026–2030
Leeds Central and Headingley	Kirkstall	Andy Rontree (Lab)	2023	2023–2027
Leeds Central and Headingley	Kirkstall	Fiona Venner (Lab)	2014	2024–2028
Leeds Central and Headingley	Little London and Woodhouse	Javaid Akhtar (Lab)	2000, 2010 (Note: Harehills (2000–2004), Gipton and Harehills (2004–2007), Hyde Park and Woodhouse (2010–2018))	2024–2028
Leeds Central and Headingley	Little London and Woodhouse	Eden Hills (GPEW)	2026	2026–2030
Leeds Central and Headingley	Little London and Woodhouse	Abigail Marshall Katung (Ind) (Note: Elected as Labour)	2019	2023–2027
Leeds Central and Headingley	Weetwood	Emma Flint (Lab)	2021	2024–2028
Leeds Central and Headingley	Weetwood	Jools Heselwood (Lab)	2015, 2023 (Note: Bramley and Stanningley (2015–2023))	2023–2027
Leeds Central and Headingley	Weetwood	Izaak Wilson (Lab)	2022	2026–2030
Leeds East	Cross Gates and Whinmoor	James Gibson (Lab)	2018, 2021 (Note: Weetwood (2018–2019))	2024–2028
Leeds East	Cross Gates and Whinmoor	Vacant	TBD	2026–2030
Leeds East	Cross Gates and Whinmoor	Jessica Lennox (Ind)	2018	2023–2027
Leeds East	Garforth and Swillington	Mark Dobson (GSI)	2007	2026–2030
Leeds East	Garforth and Swillington	Sarah Field (GSI)	2016	2024–2028
Leeds East	Garforth and Swillington	Suzanne McCormack (GSI)	2018	2023–2027
Leeds East	Gipton and Harehills	Asghar Ali (Lab)	2023	2023–2027
Leeds East	Gipton and Harehills	Mothin Ali (GPEW)	2024	2024–2028
Leeds East	Gipton and Harehills	Salma Arif (Lab)	2016	2026–2030
Leeds East	Killingbeck and Seacroft	Katie Dye (Lab)	2018	2023–2027
Leeds East	Killingbeck and Seacroft	David Jenkins (Lab)	2018	2024–2028
Leeds East	Killingbeck and Seacroft	David Dresser (Ind) (Note: Elected as Reform UK)	2026	2026–2030
Leeds East	Temple Newsam (shared with Leeds South)	Richard Barker (RUK)	2026	2026–2030
Leeds East	Temple Newsam (shared with Leeds South)	Helen Hayden (Lab)	2015	2024–2028
Leeds East	Temple Newsam (shared with Leeds South)	Kieran White (RUK)	2026	2026–2027
Leeds North East	Alwoodley	Lyn Buckley (Con)	2023	2023–2027
Leeds North East	Alwoodley	Neil Buckley (Con)	2012	2024–2028
Leeds North East	Alwoodley	Dan Cohen (Con)	2011	2026–2030
Leeds North East	Chapel Allerton	Jane Dowson (Lab)	2004	2023–2027
Leeds North East	Chapel Allerton	Mohammed Rafique (Lab)	2004	2024–2028
Leeds North East	Chapel Allerton	Cristiana Mirosanu (Ind) (Note: Elected as Green)	2026	2026–2030
Leeds North East	Moortown	Laura Fisher (Lab)	2026	2026–2030
Leeds North East	Moortown	Sharon Hamilton (Lab)	2004, 2010 (Note: Chapel Allerton (2004–2008))	2024–2028
Leeds North East	Moortown	Mohammed Shahzad (Lab)	2018	2023–2027
Leeds North East	Roundhay	Jordan Bowden (Lab)	2022	2023–2027
Leeds North East	Roundhay	Kathleen Johnstone (Lab)	2026	2026–2030
Leeds North East	Roundhay	Lisa Martin (Lab)	2021	2024–2028
Leeds North West	Adel and Wharfedale	David Stoddart-Scott (Con)	2026	2026–2030
Leeds North West	Adel and Wharfedale	Lee Farmer (Con)	2026	2026–2028
Leeds North West	Adel and Wharfedale	Billy Flynn (Con)	2016	2023–2027
Leeds North West	Guiseley and Rawdon	Oliver Edwards (Lab)	2023	2023–2027
Leeds North West	Guiseley and Rawdon	Sonia Leighton (Lab)	2024	2024–2028
Leeds North West	Guiseley and Rawdon	Eleanor Thomson (Lab)	2022	2026–2030
Leeds North West	Horsforth	Emmie Bromley (Lab)	2022	2026–2030
Leeds North West	Horsforth	John Garvani (Lab)	2002, 2022 (Note: Burmantofts (2002–2004))	2024–2028
Leeds North West	Horsforth	Raymond Jones (Lab)	2023	2023–2027
Leeds North West	Otley and Yeadon	Colin Campbell (LD)	1982, 2004 (Note: Otley and Wharfedale (1982–1998))	2026–2030
Leeds North West	Otley and Yeadon	Ryk Downes (LD)	2004	2023–2027
Leeds North West	Otley and Yeadon	Sandy Lay (LD)	2012	2024–2028
Leeds South	Beeston and Holbeck	Shaf Ali (Lab)	2024	2024–2028
Leeds South	Beeston and Holbeck	Matt Rogan (GPEW)	2026	2026–2030
Leeds South	Beeston and Holbeck	Andrew Scopes (Lab)	2018	2023–2027
Leeds South	Burmantofts and Richmond Hill	Luke Farley (Lab)	2022	2026–2030
Leeds South	Burmantofts and Richmond Hill	Asghar Khan (Lab)	2011	2024–2028
Leeds South	Burmantofts and Richmond Hill	Nkele Manaka (Lab)	2023	2023–2027
Leeds South	Hunslet and Riverside	Ed Carlisle (GPEW)	2022	2026–2030
Leeds South	Hunslet and Riverside	Mohammed Iqbal (Lab)	1999 (Note: City and Holbeck (1999–2004), City and Hunslet (2004–2018))	2024–2028
Leeds South	Hunslet and Riverside	Paul Wray (Lab)	2018	2023–2027
Leeds South	Middleton Park	Rob Chesterfield (SDP)	2024	2024–2028
Leeds South	Middleton Park	Wayne Dixon (SDP)	2022	2026–2030
Leeds South	Middleton Park	Emma Pogson-Golden (SDP)	2023	2023–2027
Leeds South West and Morley	Ardsley and Robin Hood	Karen Bruce (Lab)	2024	2024–2028
Leeds South West and Morley	Ardsley and Robin Hood	Stephen Holroyd (Lab)	2023	2023–2027
Leeds South West and Morley	Ardsley and Robin Hood	Robert Jagger (RUK)	2026	2026–2030
Leeds South West and Morley	Farnley and Wortley	Wenzdae Robbins (RUK)	2026	2026–2030
Leeds South West and Morley	Farnley and Wortley	Kate Haigh (Lab)	2024	2024–2028
Leeds South West and Morley	Farnley and Wortley	Adrian McCluskey (Lab)	2023	2023–2027
Leeds South West and Morley	Morley North	Simon Brown (MBI)	2018	2024–2028
Leeds South West and Morley	Morley North	Jonathan Graves (RUK)	2026	2026–2027
Leeds South West and Morley	Morley North	Terry Grayshon (MBI)	2026	2026–2030
Leeds South West and Morley	Morley South	Michael Burnham (RUK)	2026	2026–2030
Leeds South West and Morley	Morley South	Jane Senior (MBI)	2021	2024–2028
Leeds South West and Morley	Morley South	Ryan Taylor (RUK)	2025	2025–2027
Leeds West and Pudsey	Armley	Lou Cunningham (GPEW)	2019, 2024	2024–2028
Leeds West and Pudsey	Armley	Andy Parnham (Lab)	2023	2023–2027
Leeds West and Pudsey	Armley	Clancy Walker (GPEW)	2026	2026–2030
Leeds West and Pudsey	Bramley and Stanningley	Tom Hinchcliffe (Lab)	2023	2023–2027
Leeds West and Pudsey	Bramley and Stanningley	Adele Rae (Lab)	2024	2024–2028
Leeds West and Pudsey	Bramley and Stanningley	Kevin Ritchie (Lab)	2014	2026–2030
Leeds West and Pudsey	Calverley and Farsley	Amanda Carter (Con)	1999 (Note: Pudsey North (1999–2004)), 2015, 2026	2026–2027
Leeds West and Pudsey	Calverley and Farsley	Andrew Carter (Con)	1973 (Note: Pudsey North (1973–2004))	2026–2030
Leeds West and Pudsey	Calverley and Farsley	Craig Timmins (Lab)	2024	2024–2028
Leeds West and Pudsey	Pudsey	Dawn Seary (Con)	2021	2024–2028
Leeds West and Pudsey	Pudsey	Simon Seary (Con)	2018	2026–2030
Leeds West and Pudsey	Pudsey	Trish Smith (RUK) (Note: Elected as Conservative)	2019	2023–2027
Selby	Kippax and Methley	Mary Harland (Lab)	2012	2026–2030
Selby	Kippax and Methley	James Lewis (Lab)	2003 (Note: Barwick and Kippax (2003–2004))	2024–2028
Selby	Kippax and Methley	Michael Millar (Lab)	2023	2023–2027
Wakefield and Rothwell	Rothwell	Diane Chapman (LD)	2019	2023–2027
Wakefield and Rothwell	Rothwell	Stewart Golton (LD)	1998 (Note: Weetwood (1998–2006))	2026–2030
Wakefield and Rothwell	Rothwell	Conrad Hart-Brooke (LD)	2021	2024–2028
Wetherby and Easingwold	Harewood	Sam Firth (Con)	2018	2024–2028
Wetherby and Easingwold	Harewood	Angela Wallis (Con)	2026	2026–2030
Wetherby and Easingwold	Harewood	Ryan Stephenson (Con)	2016	2023–2027
Wetherby and Easingwold	Wetherby	Norma Harrington (Con)	2018	2026–2030
Wetherby and Easingwold	Wetherby	Alan Lamb (Con)	2007	2024–2028
Wetherby and Easingwold	Wetherby	Penny Stables (GPEW)	2023	2023–2027

== Premises ==
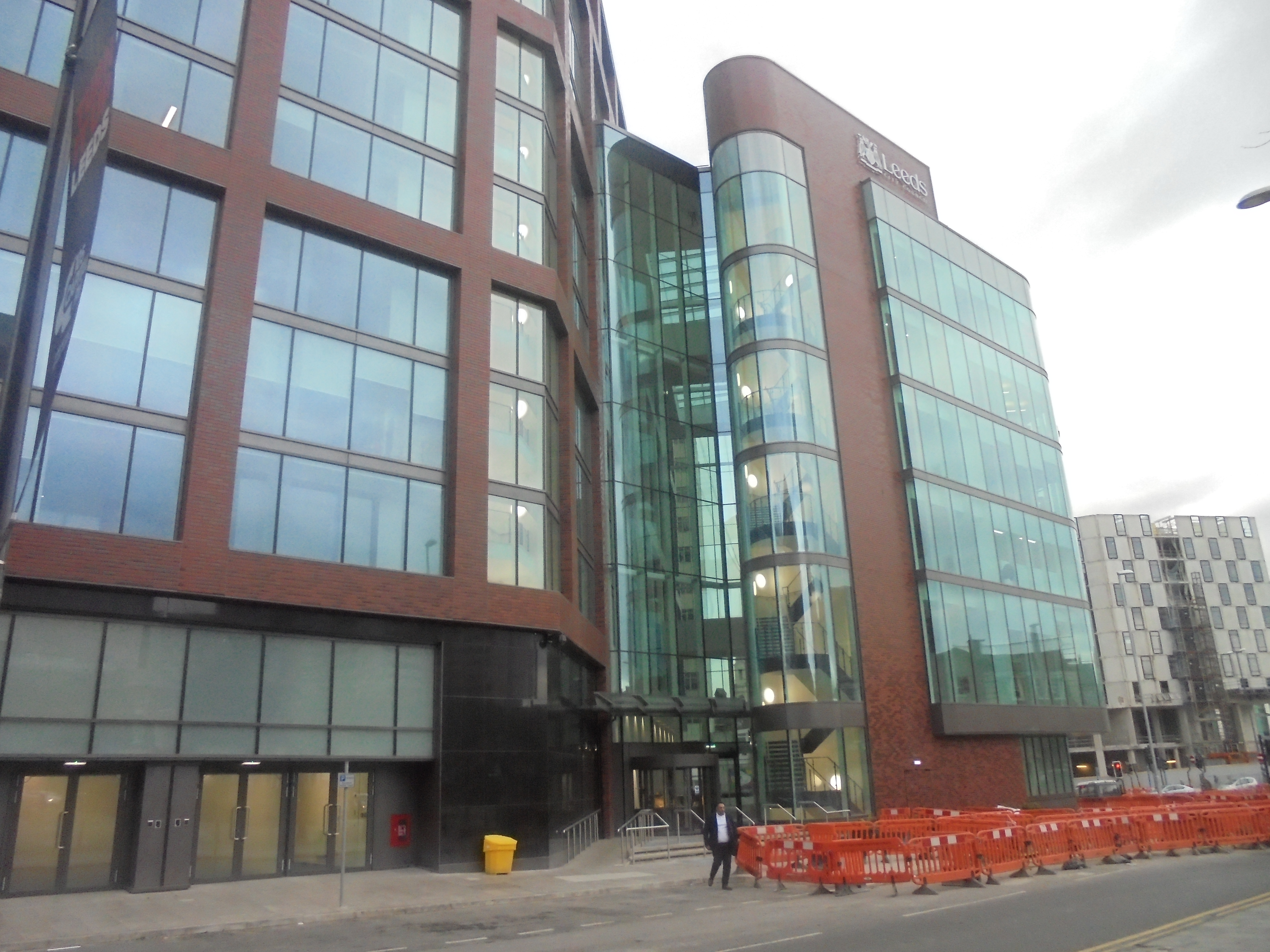
Merrion House: Council's main offices.

The council meets at Leeds Civic Hall on Calverley Street, which was purpose-built for the city council and opened in 1933. The council has numerous other buildings around the city, with its main offices being at Merrion House, which forms part of the Merrion Centre and was built in 1973.

== Controversy ==
In September 2012 the council announced its intention to introduce a bring your own device policy as part of cost saving measures. In the same year, the council was fined £95,000 by the Information Commissioner's Office (ICO) after it sent confidential and sensitive information about a child in care to the wrong recipient. Commenting on Leeds and other authorities who had made similar data protection breaches, the ICO said "It would be far too easy to consider these breaches as simple human error. The reality is that they are caused by councils treating sensitive personal data in the same routine way they would deal with more general correspondence. Far too often in these cases, the councils do not appear to have acknowledged that the data they are handling is about real people, and often the more vulnerable members of society."
