= 1949 Leeds City Council election =

English local election

The 1949 Leeds municipal elections were held on Thursday 12 May 1949, with one third of the seats to be elected.

Witnessing a slight swing away from them of 0.5%, the Conservatives won a narrow majority of the seats contested. With the seats last fought in Labour's landslide of 1945, all but four of the Conservative seats were gains. Totalling ten, the Conservatives safely gained Blenheim, Cross Gates & Temple Newsam and Upper Armley; less so in Beeston and Bramley, and very closely in Harehills, Kirkstall, Mill Hill & South and Farnley & Wortley (the latter being won by nine votes). The Conservatives also gained an extra alderman off the back of the gains, reducing Labour's hold to a slender majority of eight. Turnout returned to 46.4% after the spike recorded the previous election.

== Election result ==
Leeds local election result 1949
Party	Seats	Gains	Losses	Net gain/loss	Seats %	Votes %	Votes	+/−
Conservative	14	10	0	+10	53.8	52.5	89,802	-1.0
Labour	12	0	10	-10	46.1	42.8	73,164	+0.0
Liberal	0	0	0	0	0.0	4.1	7,021	+1.1
Communist	0	0	0	0	0.0	0.5	908	-0.2

The result had the following consequences for the total number of seats on the council after the elections:

Party	Previous council		New council	
Party	Cllr	Ald	Cllr	Ald
Labour	52	15	42	14
Conservatives	26	11	36	12
Total	78	26	78	26
Total	104		104	
Working majority	26	4	6	2
Working majority	30		8	

== Ward results ==
Armley & Wortley
Party	Candidate	Votes	%	±%
Labour	J. Underwood	3,272	63.9	+0.3
Conservative	G. Atkinson	1,848	36.1	−0.3
Majority		1,424	27.8	+0.7
Turnout		5,120		
Labour hold		Swing	+0.3	

Beeston
Party	Candidate	Votes	%	±%
Conservative	Ms. Collins	4,239	48.8	−0.6
Labour	W. Webster	3,458	40.8	+1.1
Liberal	G. Whittaker	908	10.4	−0.4
Majority		691	7.9	−1.8
Turnout		8,695		
Conservative gain from Labour		Swing	-0.8	

Blenheim
Party	Candidate	Votes	%	±%
Conservative	E. Clarke	3,580	60.7	+4.2
Labour	Albert Smith	2,322	39.3	+5.0
Majority		1,258	21.3	−0.8
Turnout		5,902		
Conservative gain from Labour		Swing	-0.4	

Bramley
Party	Candidate	Votes	%	±%
Conservative	A. Baker	4,495	47.4	+4.7
Labour	E. Kavanagh	4,077	43.0	−3.5
Liberal	F. Benfield	913	9.6	−1.2
Majority		418	4.4	+0.6
Turnout		9,485		
Conservative gain from Labour		Swing	+4.1	

Burmantofts
Party	Candidate	Votes	%	±%
Labour	W. Jackson	2,722	70.3	+2.6
Conservative	J. Steer	1,151	29.7	−2.6
Majority		1,571	40.6	+5.1
Turnout		3,873		
Labour hold		Swing	+2.6	

Central
Party	Candidate	Votes	%	±%
Labour	W. Spence	1,747	53.0	−1.2
Conservative	P. Stead	1,552	47.0	+1.2
Majority		195	5.9	−2.4
Turnout		3,299		
Labour hold		Swing	-1.2	

Cross Gates & Temple Newsam
Party	Candidate	Votes	%	±%
Conservative	W. Till	6,992	59.4	+1.9
Labour	P. Holmes	4,783	40.6	−1.9
Majority		2,209	18.8	+3.9
Turnout		11,775		
Conservative gain from Labour		Swing	+1.9	

East Hunslet
Party	Candidate	Votes	%	±%
Labour	F. Naylor	2,651	74.7	N/A
Conservative	G. Fagan	898	25.3	N/A
Majority		1,753	49.4	N/A
Turnout		3,549		N/A
Labour hold		Swing	N/A	

Far Headingley
Party	Candidate	Votes	%	±%
Conservative	F. Carter	7,770	77.0	−4.0
Labour	A. Malcolm	1,367	13.5	−5.5
Liberal	B. Graham	959	9.5	+9.5
Majority		6,403	63.4	+1.4
Turnout		10,096		
Conservative hold		Swing	+0.7	

Farnley & Wortley
Party	Candidate	Votes	%	±%
Conservative	Charles Horner	4,518	50.0	+2.3
Labour	Leonard Wilkinson	4,509	50.0	−2.3
Majority		9	0.1	−4.4
Turnout		9,027		
Conservative gain from Labour		Swing	+2.3	

Harehills
Party	Candidate	Votes	%	±%
Conservative	F. Crotty	4,512	50.5	−0.7
Labour	Ms. Jolly	4,416	49.5	+0.7
Majority		96	1.1	−1.3
Turnout		8,928		
Conservative gain from Labour		Swing	-0.7	

Holbeck North
Party	Candidate	Votes	%	±%
Labour	Ms. Whitehead	1,101	76.9	+17.0
Conservative	P. Glew	330	23.1	−3.0
Majority		771	53.9	+20.1
Turnout		1,431		
Labour hold		Swing	+10.0	

Holbeck South
Party	Candidate	Votes	%	±%
Labour	T. Smith	2,719	56.6	+0.9
Conservative	H. Drake	1,660	34.5	+1.0
Liberal	George Petch	427	8.9	−2.0
Majority		1,059	22.0	−0.1
Turnout		4,806		
Labour hold		Swing	-0.0	

Hunslet Carr & Middleton
Party	Candidate	Votes	%	±%
Labour	Arthur Brown	5,309	63.3	−1.5
Conservative	H. Grafton	2,367	28.2	−6.9
Liberal	A. Burrell	712	8.5	+8.5
Majority		2,942	35.1	+5.4
Turnout		8,388		
Labour hold		Swing	+2.7	

Hyde Park
Party	Candidate	Votes	%	±%
Conservative	P. Hutchinson	4,795	70.0	−2.5
Labour	D. Matthews	1,425	20.8	−6.7
Liberal	G. Foster	628	9.2	+9.2
Majority		3,370	49.2	+4.1
Turnout		6,848		
Conservative hold		Swing	+2.1	

Kirkstall
Party	Candidate	Votes	%	±%
Conservative	C. Turnbull	4,174	45.2	−4.6
Labour	K. Muir	4,018	43.5	+2.8
Liberal	Arthur Lawrence Braithwaite Childe	820	8.9	+2.5
Communist	R. Huffingley	220	2.4	−0.7
Majority		156	1.7	−7.4
Turnout		9,235		
Conservative gain from Labour		Swing	-3.7	

Mill Hill & South
Party	Candidate	Votes	%	±%
Conservative	W. Hey	1,409	50.9	−1.6
Labour	Ms. Gertrude Bray	1,359	49.1	+1.6
Majority		50	1.8	−3.1
Turnout		2,768		
Conservative gain from Labour		Swing	-1.6	

North
Party	Candidate	Votes	%	±%
Conservative	E. Wooler-Loy	7,957	76.0	−4.5
Labour	N. Davy	1,451	13.9	−5.6
Liberal	Wilfred Ernest Hopper	1,062	10.1	+10.1
Majority		6,506	62.1	+1.0
Turnout		10,470		
Conservative hold		Swing	+0.5	

Osmondthorpe
Party	Candidate	Votes	%	±%
Labour	H. Matthews	3,959	63.5	+0.4
Conservative	T. Nipe	2,274	36.5	−0.4
Majority		1,685	27.0	+0.8
Turnout		6,233		
Labour hold		Swing	+0.4	

Potternewton
Party	Candidate	Votes	%	±%
Conservative	C. Driver	3,997	63.3	+5.8
Labour	L. Walsh	1,876	29.7	−3.1
Communist	B. Ramelson	445	7.0	−2.6
Majority		2,121	33.6	+8.9
Turnout		6,318		
Conservative hold		Swing	+4.4	

Richmond Hill
Party	Candidate	Votes	%	±%
Labour	A. King	2,026	68.5	−0.9
Conservative	W. Walford	933	31.5	+0.9
Majority		1,093	36.9	−1.8
Turnout		2,959		
Labour hold		Swing	-0.9	

Roundhay
Party	Candidate	Votes	%	±%
Conservative	Francis Tetley	8,944	78.5	+1.5
Labour	H. Kinder	2,444	21.5	−1.5
Majority		6,500	57.1	+3.1
Turnout		11,388		
Conservative hold		Swing	+1.5	

Upper Armley
Party	Candidate	Votes	%	±%
Conservative	E. Glover	3,887	57.2	+3.1
Labour	E. Blackburn	2,913	42.8	−3.1
Majority		974	14.3	+6.1
Turnout		6,800		
Conservative gain from Labour		Swing	+3.1	

West Hunslet
Party	Candidate	Votes	%	±%
Labour	Harold Watson	2,848	53.5	+1.0
Conservative	J. Farrell	1,644	30.9	+1.6
Liberal	H. Kirkley	592	11.1	−3.0
Communist	F. Warburton	243	4.6	+0.4
Majority		1,204	22.6	−0.6
Turnout		5,327		
Labour hold		Swing	-0.3	

Westfield
Party	Candidate	Votes	%	±%
Labour	E. Stubbs	1,478	54.9	+0.5
Conservative	Ms. Gledhill	1,213	45.1	−0.5
Majority		265	9.8	+0.9
Turnout		2,691		
Labour hold		Swing	+0.5	

Woodhouse
Party	Candidate	Votes	%	±%
Labour	Ms. Clayden	2,824	51.5	+4.2
Conservative	G. Taylor	2,663	48.5	+3.7
Majority		161	2.9	+0.4
Turnout		5,487		
Labour hold		Swing	+0.2	
