= 1961 Leeds City Council election =

1961 English local government election

The 1961 Leeds municipal elections were held on Thursday 11 May 1961, with one third of the council and a vacancy in Cross Gates up for election.

In contrast to the national picture, the results in Leeds were a mirror-image of the previous year's election, with Labour enjoying a 5.5% swing in their direction, enabling them to win the majority of seats - defending all but one. The sole seat that changed hands, was the Conservative's gain in Wortley - returning the ward to full Conservative representation after a decade of mixture.

The Liberals, now including the unsuccessful Independent of the year before, retained their second place comfortably in Far Headingley and - by contrast - just three votes in Allerton. The Communists fielded a record of six candidates, gaining them their highest share on record, and highest vote since 1947. The BNP also entered their first ever candidate in Leeds, receiving 4% in Armley.

In addition, the allocation of aldermen changed, in accordance to the long running agreement between Labour and the Conservatives that they should be divided up proportional to their councillors - roughly one alderman per three councillors - granting the Tories an extra two at Labour's expense. All of which resulted in Labour's majority amounting to fourteen. Turnout returned to the mid thirties (35.6%) where it had stabilised for the latter half of the former decade, until suffering a sharp drop at the last election.

== Election result ==
Leeds local election result 1961
Party	Seats	Gains	Losses	Net gain/loss	Seats %	Votes %	Votes	+/−
Labour	18	0	1	-1	62.1	45.3	56,650	+4.3
Conservative	11	1	0	+1	37.9	48.5	60,692	-5.8
Liberal	0	0	0	0	0.0	5.1	6,438	+0.9
Communist	0	0	0	0	0.0	0.9	1,073	+0.4
British National	0	0	0	0	0.0	0.1	182	+0.1

The result had the following consequences for the total number of seats on the council after the elections:

Party	Previous council		New council	
Party	Cllr	Ald	Cllr	Ald
Labour	48	18	47	16
Conservatives	36	10	37	12
Total	84	28	84	28
Total	112		112	
Working majority	12	8	10	4
Working majority	20		14	

== Ward results ==
Allerton
Party	Candidate	Votes	%	±%
Conservative	L. Bidgood	4,214	72.1	−4.7
Liberal	Julius Blum	817	14.0	−0.8
Labour	A. Baum	814	13.9	+5.4
Majority		3,397	58.1	−4.0
Turnout		5,845		
Conservative hold		Swing		

Armley
Party	Candidate	Votes	%	±%
Labour	K. Cohen	2,451	53.3	+0.6
Conservative	R. Beal	1,965	42.7	−4.6
British National	D. Hainsworth	182	4.0	+4.0
Majority		486	10.6	+5.2
Turnout		4,598		
Labour hold		Swing	+2.6	

Beeston
Party	Candidate	Votes	%	±%
Conservative	L. Snape	3,538	53.3	+3.3
Labour	W. Prichard	3,098	46.7	+3.9
Majority		440	6.6	−0.6
Turnout		6,636		
Conservative hold		Swing	-0.3	

Blenheim
Party	Candidate	Votes	%	±%
Labour	J. Wallbanks	1,590	60.2	−5.0
Conservative	J. Butterfield	1,051	39.8	+5.0
Majority		539	20.4	−10.0
Turnout		2,641		
Labour hold		Swing	-5.0	

Bramley
Party	Candidate	Votes	%	±%
Labour	Eric Atkinson	3,225	52.6	+11.8
Conservative	H. Picking	2,903	47.4	−2.1
Majority		322	5.3	−3.4
Turnout		6,128		
Labour hold		Swing	+6.9	

Burmantofts
Party	Candidate	Votes	%	±%
Labour	G. Lloyd	2,375	73.1	+9.0
Conservative	M. Bauchop	876	26.9	−9.0
Majority		1,499	46.1	+18.0
Turnout		3,251		
Labour hold		Swing	+9.0	

City
Party	Candidate	Votes	%	±%
Labour	A. Tallant	1,224	61.5	+4.3
Conservative	D. Mowbray	765	38.5	−4.3
Majority		459	23.1	+8.5
Turnout		1,989		
Labour hold		Swing	+4.3	

Cross Gates
Party	Candidate	Votes	%	±%
Labour	F. Booth	3,649	58.4	+2.9
Labour	E. Coward	3,122		
Conservative	G. Lockwood	2,250	36.0	−8.5
Conservative	A. Lunn	2,204		
Communist	B. Wilson	344	5.5	+5.5
Majority		872	22.4	+11.4
Turnout		6,243		
Labour hold		Swing		
Labour hold		Swing	+5.7	

East Hunslet
Party	Candidate	Votes	%	±%
Labour	M. Fish	2,163	73.6	+8.4
Conservative	J. Birch	774	26.4	−8.4
Majority		1,389	47.3	+16.8
Turnout		2,937		
Labour hold		Swing	+8.4	

Far Headingley
Party	Candidate	Votes	%	±%
Conservative	W. Hey	4,140	58.2	−4.4
Liberal	John Humphrey Morrish	1,942	27.3	+6.9
Labour	J. Moynihan	1,026	14.4	−2.6
Majority		2,198	30.9	−11.3
Turnout		7,108		
Conservative hold		Swing	-5.6	

Halton
Party	Candidate	Votes	%	±%
Conservative	C. Watson	3,698	65.7	−15.0
Labour	L. Wray	1,018	18.1	−1.2
Liberal	C. Leatham	913	16.2	+16.2
Majority		2,680	47.6	−13.8
Turnout		5,629		
Conservative hold		Swing	-6.9	

Harehills
Party	Candidate	Votes	%	±%
Conservative	Lawrence Turnbull	3,034	61.3	−2.2
Labour	W. Todd	1,915	38.7	+2.2
Majority		1,119	22.6	−4.5
Turnout		4,949		
Conservative hold		Swing	-2.2	

Holbeck
Party	Candidate	Votes	%	±%
Labour	W. Jones	1,817	57.3	−6.8
Conservative	J. Robinson	874	27.6	−8.3
Liberal	H. Linley	478	15.1	+15.1
Majority		943	29.8	+1.6
Turnout		3,169		
Labour hold		Swing	+0.7	

Hunslet Carr
Party	Candidate	Votes	%	±%
Labour	J. Hodkinson	2,130	67.1	−1.7
Conservative	M. Hayne	692	21.8	−9.4
Liberal	E. Pemberton	354	11.1	+11.1
Majority		1,438	45.3	+7.8
Turnout		3,176		
Labour hold		Swing	+3.8	

Hyde Park
Party	Candidate	Votes	%	±%
Conservative	F. Hall	2,388	63.6	−7.0
Labour	L. Steele	1,368	36.4	+7.0
Majority		1,020	27.2	−13.9
Turnout		3,756		
Conservative hold		Swing	-7.0	

Kirkstall
Party	Candidate	Votes	%	±%
Labour	Albert Smith	3,222	54.4	+2.6
Conservative	F. Lucas	2,699	45.6	−2.6
Majority		523	8.8	+5.1
Turnout		5,921		
Labour hold		Swing	+2.6	

Meanwood
Party	Candidate	Votes	%	±%
Conservative	V. Cardno	3,463	76.1	−1.8
Labour	A. Kirk	1,087	23.9	+1.8
Majority		2,376	52.2	−3.7
Turnout		4,550		
Conservative hold		Swing	-1.8	

Middleton
Party	Candidate	Votes	%	±%
Labour	A. Malcolm	2,208	73.3	+1.2
Conservative	D. Lodge	630	20.9	−1.0
Communist	R. Wilkinson	175	5.8	−0.2
Majority		1,578	52.4	+2.2
Turnout		3,013		
Labour hold		Swing	+1.1	

Moortown
Party	Candidate	Votes	%	±%
Conservative	John Watson	4,329	75.6	−5.3
Labour	J. Taylor	1,398	24.4	+5.3
Majority		2,931	51.2	−10.5
Turnout		5,727		
Conservative hold		Swing	-5.3	

Osmondthorpe
Party	Candidate	Votes	%	±%
Labour	G. Addlestone	2,443	73.4	+2.2
Conservative	A. Bell	887	26.6	−2.2
Majority		1,556	46.7	+4.4
Turnout		3,330		
Labour hold		Swing	+2.2	

Potternewton
Party	Candidate	Votes	%	±%
Conservative	Sydney Symmonds	1,640	58.5	−11.7
Labour	Kevin Gould	702	25.0	+0.1
Liberal	T. Longhorn	368	13.1	+13.1
Communist	H. Fawcett	95	3.4	−1.5
Majority		938	33.4	−11.8
Turnout		2,805		
Conservative hold		Swing	-5.9	

Richmond Hill
Party	Candidate	Votes	%	±%
Labour	A. King	1,781	76.3	+2.1
Conservative	H. Flockton	456	19.5	−6.3
Communist	E. Burwin	98	4.2	+4.2
Majority		1,325	56.7	+8.4
Turnout		2,335		
Labour hold		Swing	+4.2	

Roundhay
Party	Candidate	Votes	%	±%
Conservative	Allan Bretherick	3,744	75.6	−3.5
Labour	J. Stephenson	1,208	24.4	+3.5
Majority		2,536	51.2	−7.0
Turnout		4,952		
Conservative hold		Swing	-3.5	

Stanningley
Party	Candidate	Votes	%	±%
Labour	H. Waterman	3,065	48.8	+9.3
Conservative	A. Rakusen	2,252	35.8	−6.8
Liberal	Dennis Pedder	967	15.4	−2.5
Majority		813	12.9	+9.8
Turnout		6,284		
Labour hold		Swing	+8.0	

Wellington
Party	Candidate	Votes	%	±%
Labour	N. Barratt	2,337	74.5	+2.2
Conservative	B. Pearce	593	18.9	−2.1
Communist	G. Hodgson	205	6.5	+0.0
Majority		1,744	55.6	+4.3
Turnout		3,135		
Labour hold		Swing	+2.1	

Westfield
Party	Candidate	Votes	%	±%
Labour	V. Whelan	1,986	49.0	+9.9
Conservative	F. Grainge	1,468	36.2	−7.9
Liberal	E. Vasey	599	14.8	+0.0
Majority		518	12.8	+7.8
Turnout		4,053		
Labour hold		Swing	+8.9	

Woodhouse
Party	Candidate	Votes	%	±%
Labour	P. Taylor	2,262	51.5	+6.2
Conservative	F. Greene	1,973	44.9	−3.7
Communist	E. Meth	156	3.6	+0.8
Majority		289	6.6	+3.3
Turnout		4,391		
Labour hold		Swing	+4.9	

Wortley
Party	Candidate	Votes	%	±%
Conservative	B. Emmett	3,396	52.4	−4.4
Labour	E. Morris	3,088	47.6	+4.4
Majority		308	4.8	−8.7
Turnout		6,484		
Conservative gain from Labour		Swing	-4.4	
