= 1972 Leeds City Council election =

The final Leeds municipal elections were held on 5 May 1972, with a third of the councillors up for re-election. The wide-reaching reforms set out in the Local Government Act 1972 had scheduled the council's abolition to coincide with its replacement by the enlarged successor Leeds metropolitan district on 1 April 1974. Prior to the election, a by-election had resulted in Labour gaining the seat in Castleton from the Liberals.

Labour repeated all of the gains of the previous year's gains (in the 1971 Leeds City Council election), with the exceptions of the Castleton and Osmondthorpe seats - both of which they already held; the latter being their solitary gain in the 1969 election. Much like Labour's performance in the 1969 election, the Conservatives halted their decline - at least in vote share (like Labour, their total vote actually fell a further 5,000, setting a new party low). Having won full representation in West Hunslet, the Liberals defended the seat and retained their total of four. Turnout fell to 34.4%, from 37.8% the year before.

The reaction from the Labour leader, Albert King, was one of contentment: "This is a satisfactory evening for us, and the gains were more or less in line with what I expected". The Conservatives meanwhile were reported to be relieved, with their leader Frank Marshall commenting that the results were better than expected a couple of months ago, and pointing to a significantly reduced Labour vote in Burley from the year before as a reason for optimism for the future.

The sixteen gains for Labour were enough to re-take control of the council from the Conservatives for its last years of existence.

== Election result ==
Leeds local election result 1972
Party	Seats	Gains	Losses	Net gain/loss	Seats %	Votes %	Votes	+/−
Labour	21	15	0	+15	70.0	52.6	63,893	-4.3
Conservative	8	0	15	-15	26.7	36.0	43,775	-0.4
Liberal	1	0	0	0	3.3	8.9	10,834	+2.9
Independent	0	0	0	0	0.0	1.6	1,902	+1.6
Communist	0	0	0	0	0.0	0.9	1,057	+0.2

The result had the following consequences for the total number of seats on the Council after the elections:

Party	Previous council		New council	
Party	Cllr	Ald	Cllr	Ald
Labour	41	14	56	14
Conservatives	45	16	30	16
Liberals	4	0	4	0
Total	90	30	90	30
Total	120		120	
Working majority	0	-2	22	-2
Working majority	-2		20	

== Ward results ==
Armley
Party	Candidate	Votes	%	±%
Labour	J. Dixon	2,478	47.4	−8.8
Conservative	C. Mathers	1,369	26.2	−4.8
Liberal	R. Meadowcroft	1,325	25.3	+13.2
Communist	P. Wilton	60	1.1	+0.4
Majority		1,109	21.2	−4.0
Turnout		5,232		
Labour gain from Conservative		Swing	-2.0	

Beeston
Party	Candidate	Votes	%	±%
Labour	A. Barnard	2,643	52.3	−4.3
Conservative	A. Dunn	2,111	41.8	+2.9
Liberal	L. Ellis	296	5.9	+1.4
Majority		532	10.5	−7.3
Turnout		5,050		
Labour gain from Conservative		Swing	-3.6	

Bramley
Party	Candidate	Votes	%	±%
Labour	E. Millett	2,834	65.8	−1.3
Conservative	M. Robinson	1,476	34.2	+1.3
Majority		1,358	31.6	−2.6
Turnout		4,310		
Labour gain from Conservative		Swing	-1.3	

Burley
Party	Candidate	Votes	%	±%
Labour	A. Donohoe	1,791	58.4	−3.1
Conservative	D. Ramsden	1,175	38.3	+1.5
Communist	T. Flynn	102	3.3	+1.5
Majority		616	20.1	−4.6
Turnout		3,068		
Labour gain from Conservative		Swing	-2.3	

Burmantofts
Party	Candidate	Votes	%	±%
Labour	A. Blower	3,005	72.6	−1.3
Conservative	C. Thomas	1,042	25.2	+0.7
Communist	F. Stockdale	93	2.2	+0.6
Majority		1,963	47.4	−2.0
Turnout		4,140		
Labour gain from Conservative		Swing	-1.0	

Castleton
Party	Candidate	Votes	%	±%
Labour	K. Dockwray	2,124	53.1	+4.2
Liberal	B. Nelson	1,569	39.2	−6.3
Conservative	M. Mathews	262	6.6	+2.1
Communist	K. Robinson	44	1.1	+0.0
Majority		555	13.9	+10.5
Turnout		3,999		
Labour hold		Swing	+5.2	

Chapel Allerton
Party	Candidate	Votes	%	±%
Conservative	J. Hunt	2,392	74.7	+3.5
Labour	L. Fineberg	638	19.9	+0.6
Liberal	O. Braham	174	5.4	−4.2
Majority		1,754	54.8	+2.9
Turnout		3,204		
Conservative hold		Swing	+1.4	

City
Party	Candidate	Votes	%	±%
Labour	Doreen Jenner	2,055	82.6	−3.2
Conservative	W. Annan	338	13.6	−0.6
Liberal	S. Waldenburg	96	3.9	+3.9
Majority		1,717	69.0	−2.6
Turnout		2,489		
Labour hold		Swing	-1.3	

Cookridge
Party	Candidate	Votes	%	±%
Conservative	C. Jenkins	2,831	55.0	+5.3
Labour	L. Morrison	1,706	33.1	−2.7
Liberal	V. Finkle	610	11.9	−2.6
Majority		1,125	21.9	+8.0
Turnout		5,147		
Conservative hold		Swing	+4.0	

East Hunslet
Party	Candidate	Votes	%	±%
Labour	G. Bowsley	2,267	65.8	−18.3
Liberal	T. Clarkson	979	28.4	+22.0
Conservative	B. Cresswell	199	5.8	−3.7
Majority		1,288	37.4	−37.2
Turnout		3,445		
Labour hold		Swing	-20.1	

Gipton
Party	Candidate	Votes	%	±%
Labour	Arthur Vollans	2,781	64.1	−0.3
Conservative	M. Suttenstall	1,271	29.3	−3.1
Liberal	K. Pedder	188	4.3	+2.4
Communist	J. Bellamy	97	2.2	+0.9
Majority		1,510	34.8	+2.8
Turnout		4,337		
Labour gain from Conservative		Swing	+1.4	

Halton
Party	Candidate	Votes	%	±%
Conservative	Martin Dodgson	2,108	53.4	−12.4
Labour	K. Jeffrey	1,244	31.5	−2.6
Liberal	S. Roome	594	15.1	+15.1
Majority		864	21.9	−9.8
Turnout		3,946		
Conservative hold		Swing	-4.9	

Harehills
Party	Candidate	Votes	%	±%
Labour	C. Green	1,922	51.7	+3.7
Conservative	J. Moran	1,606	43.2	−4.2
Liberal	R. Farrar	192	5.2	+0.5
Majority		316	8.5	+7.9
Turnout		3,720		
Labour gain from Conservative		Swing	+3.9	

Headingley
Party	Candidate	Votes	%	±%
Conservative	E. Clark	2,219	51.5	−7.9
Labour	T. Donohoe	1,695	39.3	−1.3
Liberal	J. Coates	394	9.1	+9.1
Majority		524	12.2	−6.5
Turnout		4,308		
Conservative hold		Swing	-3.3	

Holbeck
Party	Candidate	Votes	%	±%
Labour	Bernard Atha	2,253	78.7	−4.4
Liberal	R. Whitelock	323	11.3	+5.9
Conservative	L. Dobkin	287	10.0	−1.5
Majority		1,930	67.4	−4.1
Turnout		2,863		
Conservative hold		Swing	-5.1	

Kirkstall
Party	Candidate	Votes	%	±%
Labour	Elizabeth Nash	3,474	58.3	−1.9
Conservative	J. Horrocks	2,406	40.4	+1.9
Communist	J. Sidebottom	77	1.3	+0.0
Majority		1,068	17.9	−3.8
Turnout		5,957		
Labour gain from Conservative		Swing	-1.9	

Middleton
Party	Candidate	Votes	%	±%
Labour	J. Kitchen	2,802	83.7	−0.2
Conservative	P. Johnson	426	12.7	+3.9
Communist	D. Priscott	121	3.6	+0.7
Majority		2,376	71.0	−4.1
Turnout		3,349		
Labour hold		Swing	-2.0	

Moortown
Party	Candidate	Votes	%	±%
Conservative	A. Redmond	2,361	59.3	+7.1
Labour	M. Cliff	1,272	31.9	−5.9
Liberal	L. Waldenburg	350	8.8	−1.2
Majority		1,089	27.3	+13.0
Turnout		3,983		
Conservative hold		Swing	+6.5	

Osmondthorpe
Party	Candidate	Votes	%	±%
Labour	W. Prichard	3,122	76.2	+0.9
Conservative	Doreen Wood	921	22.5	−2.2
Communist	D. Cook	54	1.3	+1.3
Majority		2,201	53.7	+3.1
Turnout		4,097		
Labour hold		Swing	+1.5	

Richmond Hill
Party	Candidate	Votes	%	±%
Labour	Tom Cooke	2,587	73.7	−4.4
Conservative	G. Dimmock	873	24.9	+4.6
Communist	D. Fawcett	48	1.4	−0.2
Majority		1,714	48.9	−8.9
Turnout		3,508		
Labour gain from Conservative		Swing	-4.5	

Roundhay
Party	Candidate	Votes	%	±%
Conservative	A. Johnson	2,920	79.0	+0.7
Labour	L. Milburn	588	15.9	−5.8
Liberal	D. Freethby	189	5.1	+5.1
Majority		2,332	63.1	+6.5
Turnout		3,697		
Conservative hold		Swing	+3.2	

Scott Hall
Party	Candidate	Votes	%	±%
Labour	A. Baum	1,837	61.1	−6.8
Conservative	V. Darton	915	30.4	+0.1
Liberal	D. Thorpe	200	6.6	+6.6
Communist	M. Temple	56	1.9	+0.0
Majority		922	30.7	−6.9
Turnout		3,008		
Labour gain from Conservative		Swing	-3.4	

Seacroft
Party	Candidate	Votes	%	±%
Labour	F. Stringer	4,564	78.8	+0.2
Conservative	D. Ball	1,152	19.9	−0.5
Communist	A. Dale	75	1.3	+0.3
Majority		3,412	58.9	+0.7
Turnout		5,791		
Labour gain from Conservative		Swing	+0.3	

Stanningley
Party	Candidate	Votes	%	±%
Labour	A. Miller	2,874	65.9	−3.1
Conservative	I. Benton	1,429	32.8	+3.4
Communist	R. Quarmby	55	1.3	−0.3
Majority		1,445	33.2	−6.5
Turnout		4,358		
Labour gain from Conservative		Swing	-3.2	

Talbot
Party	Candidate	Votes	%	±%
Conservative	Ronnie Feldman	2,478	65.9	−4.6
Labour	L. Naylor	873	23.2	−0.4
Liberal	M. Phillips	410	10.9	+5.0
Majority		1,605	42.7	−4.2
Turnout		3,761		
Conservative hold		Swing	-2.1	

Weetwood
Party	Candidate	Votes	%	±%
Conservative	S. Rostron	2,905	55.2	−26.2
Independent	E. Firth	1,902	36.1	+36.1
Labour	S. Akbar	457	8.7	−9.9
Majority		1,003	19.1	−43.7
Turnout		5,264		
Conservative hold		Swing	-31.1	

West Hunslet
Party	Candidate	Votes	%	±%
Liberal	Dennis Pedder	2,347	60.9	+8.8
Labour	J. Wright	1,144	29.7	−5.6
Conservative	J. Dawson	363	9.4	−3.2
Majority		1,203	31.2	+14.4
Turnout		3,854		
Liberal hold		Swing	+7.2	

Whinmoor
Party	Candidate	Votes	%	±%
Labour	F. Davis	2,563	71.0	−4.8
Conservative	P. White	983	27.2	+4.1
Communist	H. Besser	62	1.7	+0.6
Majority		1,580	43.8	−8.9
Turnout		3,608		
Labour gain from Conservative		Swing	-4.4	

Woodhouse
Party	Candidate	Votes	%	±%
Labour	J. Roche	1,521	47.0	−10.8
Conservative	P. Fingret	1,005	31.0	−7.9
Liberal	M. Baker	598	18.5	+18.5
Communist	L. Morris	113	3.5	+0.2
Majority		516	15.9	−2.9
Turnout		3,237		
Labour gain from Conservative		Swing	-1.4	

Wortley
Party	Candidate	Votes	%	±%
Labour	F. Selby	2,779	58.7	+0.2
Conservative	F. Stubley	1,952	41.3	+7.0
Majority		827	17.5	−6.8
Turnout		4,731		
Labour gain from Conservative		Swing	-3.4	
