= 1967 Leeds City Council election =

1967 English local government election

The 1967 Leeds municipal elections were held on Thursday 11 May 1967, with one third of the council up for election as well as vacancies in the wards of Woodhouse and Wortley.

The final election on present boundaries, the Conservatives won a decisive victory on a 3.8% swing to a record share and their highest vote in over fifteen years. The Tories picked up five seats in total from Labour, and for the first time since 1951, won their second seat in the wards of Kirkstall, Stanningley and Westfield, and gained full representation in Bramley and Wortley. With those gains the Conservatives now had a narrow lead in councillors, with only Labour's superior aldermen totals stopping the Tories from gaining the council and adding it to the list of momentous victories that night.

Elsewhere the Liberals seen yet another fall in their vote, returning their third place to contention as the Communists continued inching upwards, comfortably achieving their greatest vote. Last year's British National candidate stood again in Armley, but this time as a National Front candidate and an Independent contested Bramley. Turnout rose dramatically following the previous year's poor figure to 39.2%, the best participation seen since 1955.

== Election result ==
Leeds local election result 1967
Party	Seats	Gains	Losses	Net gain/loss	Seats %	Votes %	Votes	+/−
Conservative	17	5	0	+5	56.7	58.1	74,853	+4.4
Labour	13	0	5	-5	43.3	37.5	48,361	-3.2
Liberal	0	0	0	0	0.0	2.3	2,999	-1.5
Communist	0	0	0	0	0.0	1.7	2,170	+0.1
Independent	0	0	0	0	0.0	0.2	300	+0.2
National Front	0	0	0	0	0.0	0.1	94	+0.1

The result had the following consequences for the total number of seats on the council after the elections:

Party	Previous council		New council	
Party	Cllr	Ald	Cllr	Ald
Labour	46	19	41	19
Conservatives	38	9	43	9
Total	84	28	84	28
Total	112		112	
Working majority	8	10	-2	10
Working majority	18		8	

== Ward results ==
Allerton
Party	Candidate	Votes	%	±%
Conservative	L. Bidgood	5,885	85.2	+2.2
Labour	V. Zermansky	1,024	14.8	−2.2
Majority		4,861	70.4	+4.4
Turnout		6,909		
Conservative hold		Swing	+2.2	

Armley
Party	Candidate	Votes	%	±%
Labour	K. Cohen	2,598	50.0	−3.4
Conservative	G. Atkinson	2,354	45.3	+5.0
Liberal	T. Alcock	152	2.9	+2.9
National Front	P. Stone	94	1.8	+1.8
Majority		244	4.7	−8.4
Turnout		5,198		
Labour hold		Swing	-4.2	

Beeston
Party	Candidate	Votes	%	±%
Conservative	L. Snape	3,941	54.3	+3.5
Labour	A. Beevers	3,321	45.7	−3.5
Majority		620	8.5	+7.0
Turnout		7,262		
Conservative hold		Swing	+3.5	

Blenheim
Party	Candidate	Votes	%	±%
Labour	J. Wallbanks	904	51.1	−9.2
Conservative	R. Harker	864	48.9	+9.2
Majority		40	2.3	−18.4
Turnout		1,768		
Labour hold		Swing	-9.2	

Bramley
Party	Candidate	Votes	%	±%
Conservative	M. Robinson	3,328	49.0	−3.7
Labour	Eric Atkinson	3,159	46.5	−0.7
Independent	J. Waddington	300	4.4	+4.4
Majority		169	2.5	−2.9
Turnout		6,787		
Conservative gain from Labour		Swing	-1.5	

Burmantofts
Party	Candidate	Votes	%	±%
Labour	G. Lloyd	1,543	55.6	−1.6
Conservative	C. Thomas	1,232	44.4	+1.6
Majority		311	11.2	−3.2
Turnout		2,775		
Labour hold		Swing	-1.6	

City
Party	Candidate	Votes	%	±%
Labour	A. Tallant	659	53.0	−12.4
Conservative	D. Ramsden	584	47.0	+12.4
Majority		75	6.0	−24.8
Turnout		1,243		
Labour hold		Swing	-12.4	

Cross Gates
Party	Candidate	Votes	%	±%
Labour	F. Booth	3,537	52.7	+3.6
Conservative	R. Vaughan	2,787	41.5	−3.5
Communist	T. Scawthorne	390	5.8	−0.1
Majority		750	11.2	+7.1
Turnout		6,714		
Labour hold		Swing	+3.5	

East Hunslet
Party	Candidate	Votes	%	±%
Labour	M. Fish	1,084	58.9	−5.1
Conservative	E. Feather	756	41.1	+5.1
Majority		328	17.8	−10.3
Turnout		1,840		
Labour hold		Swing	-5.1	

Far Headingley
Party	Candidate	Votes	%	±%
Conservative	R. Hall	6,555	72.5	+7.6
Labour	C. Furniss	1,351	15.0	+0.8
Liberal	J. Harris	1,130	12.5	−8.3
Majority		5,204	57.6	+13.5
Turnout		9,036		
Conservative hold		Swing	+3.4	

Halton
Party	Candidate	Votes	%	±%
Conservative	C. Watson	5,323	78.5	+1.0
Labour	D. Hamilton	1,462	21.5	−1.0
Majority		3,861	56.9	+2.1
Turnout		6,785		
Conservative hold		Swing	+1.0	

Harehills
Party	Candidate	Votes	%	±%
Conservative	J. White	3,013	66.9	+6.0
Labour	Doreen Jenner	1,488	33.1	−6.0
Majority		1,525	33.9	+12.0
Turnout		4,501		
Conservative hold		Swing	+6.0	

Holbeck
Party	Candidate	Votes	%	±%
Labour	W. Jones	1,504	52.0	−9.9
Conservative	M. Waddington	1,259	43.5	+8.1
Communist	J. McCarthy	130	4.5	+1.7
Majority		245	8.5	−17.9
Turnout		2,893		
Labour hold		Swing	-9.0	

Hunslet Carr
Party	Candidate	Votes	%	±%
Labour	R. Pepper	1,684	55.7	−11.3
Conservative	P. Goodwin	1,226	40.5	+10.9
Communist	F. Burwin	116	3.8	+0.4
Majority		458	15.1	−22.3
Turnout		3,026		
Labour hold		Swing	-11.1	

Hyde Park
Party	Candidate	Votes	%	±%
Conservative	F. Hall	2,657	67.2	+9.4
Labour	H. Best	1,112	28.1	−10.1
Communist	S. Walker	185	4.7	+0.6
Majority		1,545	39.1	+19.5
Turnout		3,954		
Conservative hold		Swing	+9.7	

Kirkstall
Party	Candidate	Votes	%	±%
Conservative	H. Newton	3,055	50.4	+7.7
Labour	Albert Smith	2,871	47.4	−7.0
Communist	B. Huffingley	133	2.2	−0.6
Majority		184	3.0	−8.6
Turnout		6,059		
Conservative gain from Labour		Swing	+7.3	

Meanwood
Party	Candidate	Votes	%	±%
Conservative	V. Cardno	3,677	72.6	+5.9
Labour	O. Winship	879	17.4	−3.8
Liberal	A. Wren	507	10.0	−2.1
Majority		2,798	55.3	+9.7
Turnout		5,063		
Conservative hold		Swing	+4.8	

Middleton
Party	Candidate	Votes	%	±%
Labour	A. Malcolm	2,382	67.2	−11.9
Conservative	R. Heslett	973	27.4	+11.0
Communist	D. Priscott	192	5.4	+0.9
Majority		1,409	39.7	−23.0
Turnout		3,547		
Labour hold		Swing	-11.4	

Moortown
Party	Candidate	Votes	%	±%
Conservative	Bertrand Mather	6,141	79.6	+4.0
Labour	C. Say	1,169	15.1	−2.9
Communist	T. Kelly	409	5.3	−1.1
Majority		4,972	64.4	+6.8
Turnout		7,719		
Conservative hold		Swing	+3.4	

Osmondthorpe
Party	Candidate	Votes	%	±%
Labour	G. Addlestone	1,638	57.8	−9.8
Conservative	E. Lewis	1,197	42.2	+9.8
Majority		441	15.6	−19.6
Turnout		2,835		
Labour hold		Swing	-9.8	

Potternewton
Party	Candidate	Votes	%	±%
Conservative	Sydney Symmonds	2,003	77.2	+17.4
Labour	M. Lawrence	418	16.1	−13.1
Communist	A. Dale	175	6.7	+5.0
Majority		1,585	61.1	+30.5
Turnout		2,596		
Conservative hold		Swing	+15.2	

Richmond Hill
Party	Candidate	Votes	%	±%
Labour	J. Mathers	1,834	61.9	−9.3
Conservative	G. Russell	914	30.9	+10.3
Communist	T. Johnson	213	7.2	−1.0
Majority		920	31.1	−19.6
Turnout		2,961		
Labour hold		Swing	-9.8	

Roundhay
Party	Candidate	Votes	%	±%
Conservative	Allan Bretherick	4,777	80.4	+1.8
Labour	D. Thomas	1,168	19.6	−1.8
Majority		3,609	60.7	+3.6
Turnout		5,945		
Conservative hold		Swing	+1.8	

Stanningley
Party	Candidate	Votes	%	±%
Conservative	K. Knapton	3,037	49.1	+9.3
Labour	H. Waterman	2,871	46.4	+1.2
Liberal	F. Robertson	279	4.5	−10.5
Majority		166	2.7	−2.8
Turnout		6,187		
Conservative gain from Labour		Swing	+4.0	

Wellington
Party	Candidate	Votes	%	±%
Labour	N. Barrett	980	55.7	−7.1
Conservative	B. Pearce	482	27.4	+11.9
Liberal	W. Alcock	228	13.0	−2.7
Communist	M. Rogers	70	4.0	−2.0
Majority		498	28.3	−18.8
Turnout		1,760		
Labour hold		Swing	-9.5	

Westfield
Party	Candidate	Votes	%	±%
Conservative	A. Sexton	1,332	54.4	+5.7
Labour	V. Whelan	1,118	45.6	−5.7
Majority		214	8.7	+6.1
Turnout		2,450		
Conservative gain from Labour		Swing	+5.7	

Woodhouse
Party	Candidate	Votes	%	±%
Labour	P. Taylor	2,100	48.9	+0.3
Conservative	P. Fingret	2,036	47.4	−0.8
Conservative	D. Crawford	2,033		
Labour	J. Moynihan	2,006		
Communist	M. Moore	157	3.7	+0.5
Majority		27	1.5	+1.0
Turnout		4,293		
Labour hold		Swing	+0.5	
Conservative hold		Swing		

Wortley
Party	Candidate	Votes	%	±%
Conservative	R. Beal	3,465	51.9	+5.2
Conservative	R. Treeman	3,380		
Labour	J. Klineberg	2,503	37.5	−3.3
Labour	J. Stephen	2,479		
Liberal	Walter Holdsworth	703	10.5	−1.9
Liberal	J. Saxton	687		
Majority		877	14.4	+8.4
Turnout		6,671		
Conservative hold		Swing		
Conservative gain from Labour		Swing	+4.2	
