= 1952 Leeds City Council election =

English local election

The 1952 Leeds municipal elections were held on Thursday 8 May 1952, with one third of the council to be elected.

Along with the rest of the country, Leeds saw a sharp swing from the Conservatives to Labour with a swing of over 15%, resulting in Labour receiving their highest post-war vote and making nine gains (alongside a gain in the interim) to whittle the Tory majority down to just two. Labour's nine gains were in the wards of Armley, Beeston, Blenheim, Bramley, Cross Gates, Stanningley, Westfield, Woodhouse, and Wortley. They also narrowly missed out on gaining Harehills. With the exception of a close-run victory in Beeston, the remarkably large swing made the Labour gains fairly comfortable. Turnout fell by two percent from the previous year, to 43.9%.

== Election result ==
Leeds local election result 1952
Party	Seats	Gains	Losses	Net gain/loss	Seats %	Votes %	Votes	+/−
Labour	19	9	0	+9	67.8	56.5	87,821	+16.7
Conservative	9	0	9	-9	32.1	42.5	66,018	-13.3
Liberal	0	0	0	0	0.0	0.8	1,213	-3.2
Communist	0	0	0	0	0.0	0.1	236	-0.3

The result had the following consequences for the total number of seats on the council after the elections:

Party	Previous council		New council	
Party	Cllr	Ald	Cllr	Ald
Conservatives	52	18	43	14
Labour	32	10	41	14
Total	84	28	84	28
Total	112		112	
Working majority	20	8	2	0
Working majority	28		2	

== Ward results ==
Allerton
Party	Candidate	Votes	%	±%
Conservative	H. Drake	5,101	83.8	+5.3
Labour	J. Shakleton	984	16.2	+4.5
Majority		4,117	67.7	+0.8
Turnout		6,085		
Conservative hold		Swing	+0.4	

Armley
Party	Candidate	Votes	%	±%
Labour	K. Cohen	4,136	61.4	+16.9
Conservative	J. North	2,600	38.6	−7.6
Majority		1,536	22.8	+21.1
Turnout		6,736		
Labour gain from Conservative		Swing	+12.2	

Beeston
Party	Candidate	Votes	%	±%
Labour	H. Wright	3,884	51.1	+14.1
Conservative	B. Bolton	3,722	48.9	−5.9
Majority		162	2.1	−15.7
Turnout		7,606		
Labour gain from Conservative		Swing	+10.0	

Blenheim
Party	Candidate	Votes	%	±%
Labour	J. Wallbanks	3,204	57.5	+12.5
Conservative	J. Butterfield	2,373	42.5	−12.5
Majority		831	14.9	+4.8
Turnout		5,577		
Labour gain from Conservative		Swing	+12.5	

Bramley
Party	Candidate	Votes	%	±%
Labour	Eric Atkinson	3,904	60.0	+19.5
Conservative	H. Womersley	2,600	40.0	−6.3
Majority		1,304	20.0	+14.3
Turnout		6,504		
Labour gain from Conservative		Swing	+12.9	

Burmantofts
Party	Candidate	Votes	%	±%
Labour	W. Jackson	3,327	74.8	+18.4
Conservative	J. Sizer	1,119	25.2	−18.4
Majority		2,208	49.7	+36.8
Turnout		4,446		
Labour hold		Swing	+18.4	

City
Party	Candidate	Votes	%	±%
Labour	E. Whitehead	2,694	68.9	+13.5
Conservative	N. Kay	1,216	31.1	−13.5
Majority		1,478	37.8	+26.9
Turnout		3,910		
Labour hold		Swing	+13.5	

Cross Gates
Party	Candidate	Votes	%	±%
Labour	F. Booth	3,342	70.1	+21.5
Conservative	A. Ingram	1,427	29.9	−21.5
Majority		1,915	40.2	+37.3
Turnout		4,769		
Labour gain from Conservative		Swing	+21.5	

East Hunslet
Party	Candidate	Votes	%	±%
Labour	M. Fish	3,884	82.7	+21.8
Conservative	G. Hewdy	814	17.3	−21.8
Majority		3,070	65.3	+43.5
Turnout		4,698		
Labour hold		Swing	+21.8	

Far Headingley
Party	Candidate	Votes	%	±%
Conservative	W. Hey	3,725	79.0	−5.4
Labour	W. Lord	989	21.0	+5.4
Majority		2,736	58.0	−10.9
Turnout		4,714		
Conservative hold		Swing	-5.4	

Halton
Party	Candidate	Votes	%	±%
Conservative	C. Watson	3,405	66.4	−9.3
Labour	A. Harrison	1,522	29.7	+5.5
Liberal	Victor Louis Raymond Delepine	198	3.9	+3.9
Majority		1,883	36.7	−14.8
Turnout		5,125		
Conservative hold		Swing	-7.4	

Harehills
Party	Candidate	Votes	%	±%
Conservative	Lawrence Turnbull	3,011	51.2	−14.8
Labour	G. Lloyd	2,869	48.8	+14.8
Majority		142	2.4	−29.7
Turnout		5,880		
Conservative hold		Swing	-14.8	

Holbeck
Party	Candidate	Votes	%	±%
Labour	W. Jones	4,072	69.4	+17.7
Conservative	J. Farrell	1,379	23.5	−15.6
Liberal	K. Heald	420	7.2	−2.1
Majority		2,693	45.9	+33.4
Turnout		5,871		
Labour hold		Swing	+16.6	

Hunslet Carr
Party	Candidate	Votes	%	±%
Labour	E. Hodkinson	4,195	80.2	+22.6
Conservative	T. Snape	885	16.9	−13.6
Communist	J. Roche	153	2.9	+2.9
Majority		3,310	63.3	+36.2
Turnout		5,233		
Labour hold		Swing	+18.1	

Hyde Park
Party	Candidate	Votes	%	±%
Conservative	F. Walker	3,398	60.0	−4.3
Labour	B. Cohen	2,263	40.0	+16.9
Majority		1,135	20.0	−21.2
Turnout		5,661		
Conservative hold		Swing	-10.6	

Kirkstall
Party	Candidate	Votes	%	±%
Labour	Albert Smith	4,734	63.2	+16.9
Conservative	F. Cowell	2,398	32.0	−11.1
Liberal	A. Powell	362	4.8	−5.7
Majority		2,336	31.2	+28.0
Turnout		7,494		
Labour hold		Swing	+14.0	

Meanwood
Party	Candidate	Votes	%	±%
Conservative	V. Cardno	3,804	68.2	−9.6
Labour	K. Davy	1,777	31.8	+9.6
Majority		2,027	36.3	−19.2
Turnout		5,581		
Conservative hold		Swing	-9.6	

Middleton
Party	Candidate	Votes	%	±%
Labour	Harold Watson	4,190	89.7	+20.3
Conservative	P. Clew	479	10.3	−20.3
Majority		3,711	79.5	+40.6
Turnout		4,669		
Labour hold		Swing	+20.3	

Moortown
Party	Candidate	Votes	%	±%
Conservative	John Watson	3,703	72.7	−5.8
Labour	S. Lee	1,390	27.3	+5.8
Majority		2,313	45.4	−11.6
Turnout		5,093		
Conservative hold		Swing	-11.6	

Osmondthorpe
Party	Candidate	Votes	%	±%
Labour	F. Potter	4,151	83.0	+16.8
Conservative	W. Brownridge	851	17.0	−16.8
Majority		3,300	66.0	+33.6
Turnout		5,002		
Labour hold		Swing	+16.8	

Potternewton
Party	Candidate	Votes	%	±%
Conservative	T. Driver	2,199	55.8	−8.2
Labour	A. Sharp	1,743	44.2	+15.5
Majority		456	11.6	−23.7
Turnout		3,942		
Conservative hold		Swing	-11.8	

Richmond Hill
Party	Candidate	Votes	%	±%
Labour	A. King	3,478	85.0	+17.2
Conservative	W. Clayton	613	15.0	−17.2
Majority		2,865	70.0	+34.4
Turnout		4,091		
Labour hold		Swing	+17.2	

Roundhay
Party	Candidate	Votes	%	±%
Conservative	Allan Bretherick	4,185	59.3	−14.5
Labour	E. Morris	2,869	40.7	+14.5
Majority		1,316	18.7	−28.9
Turnout		7,054		
Conservative hold		Swing	-14.5	

Stanningley
Party	Candidate	Votes	%	±%
Labour	R. Waterman	3,893	59.3	+15.5
Conservative	T. Kirkby	2,670	40.7	−15.5
Majority		1,223	18.6	+6.3
Turnout		6,563		
Labour gain from Conservative		Swing	+15.5	

Wellington
Party	Candidate	Votes	%	±%
Labour	E. Youngman	3,938	75.8	+16.6
Conservative	J. Palmer	938	18.1	−15.5
Liberal	Harry Burbridge	233	4.5	+4.5
Communist	B. Kline	83	1.6	−5.6
Majority		3,000	57.8	+32.1
Turnout		5,192		
Labour hold		Swing	+16.0	

Westfield
Party	Candidate	Votes	%	±%
Labour	A. Malcolm	2,834	55.0	+16.3
Conservative	R. Neill	2,319	45.0	−16.3
Majority		515	10.0	−12.7
Turnout		5,153		
Labour gain from Conservative		Swing	+16.3	

Woodhouse
Party	Candidate	Votes	%	±%
Labour	Henry Vick	3,850	64.9	+20.8
Conservative	B. Gardner	2,082	35.1	−20.8
Majority		1,768	29.8	+17.9
Turnout		5,932		
Labour gain from Conservative		Swing	+20.8	

Wortley
Party	Candidate	Votes	%	±%
Labour	Aimee Tong	3,705	55.2	+15.8
Conservative	Mary Dowling	3,002	44.8	−7.2
Majority		703	10.5	−2.0
Turnout		6,707		
Labour gain from Conservative		Swing	+11.5	
