= 1945 Leeds City Council election =

1945 English local government election

The 1945 Leeds municipal elections were held on Thursday 1 November 1945. Although a third of the council would ordinarily be up for election, the suspension of elections during World War II meant the council had last held elections in 1938, and with the amount of vacancies and co-options throughout near to two-thirds of the council needed electing.

Labour repeated their earlier national performance and won sweeping victories across the country, with Leeds no exception, picking up 40 of the 48 seats contested (with Richmond Hill going unopposed) and stealing control of the council from the Conservatives. The Conservatives only managed eight defences, which were confined to their bastions of Far Headingley, Hyde Park, North and Roundhay, although running Labour exceptionally close in Blenheim. The minor parties also failed to escape the Labour tide, as the Liberals lost both their representatives (a councillor and an alderman) and the Communists their sole councillor in Woodhouse - formally Labour, but expelled for alleged Communist sympathies.

As well as the 21 gains Labour made that night, the gentlemen's agreement - signed between Labour and the Conservatives in 1930 to allocate aldermen in proportion to their councillors - further rewarded Labour with an extra five aldermen at mostly Tory expense (the other being the aforementioned Liberal) in recognition of those gains. As a result, Labour emerged with an overall majority of 42 on a turnout of 43.3%.

== Election result ==
Leeds local election result 1945
Party	Seats	Gains	Losses	Net gain/loss	Seats %	Votes %	Votes	+/−
Labour	40	21	0	+21	83.3	57.5	84,969	
Conservative	8	0	19	-19	16.7	36.9	54,551	
Liberal	0	0	1	-1	0.0	5.6	8,214	

The result had the following consequences for the total number of seats on the council after the elections:

Party	Previous council		New council	
Party	Cllr	Ald	Cllr	Ald
Labour	37	10	58	15
Conservatives	39	15	20	11
Liberals	1	1	0	0
Communists	1	0	0	0
Total	78	26	78	26
Total	104		104	
Working majority	-4	-6	38	4
Working majority	-10		42	

== Ward results ==
Armley & Wortley
Party	Candidate	Votes	%	±%
Labour	Joseph Wilkinson	3,477	80.9	
Labour	Joseph Bissell	3,473		
Labour	Annie Marlow	3,464		
Conservative	Joseph Hiley	823	19.1	
Majority		2,641	61.7	
Turnout		4,300		

Beeston
Party	Candidate	Votes	%	±%
Labour	Wilfred Webster	4,083	51.3	
Conservative	Joseph Moorhouse	2,995	37.7	
Liberal	Ms Rowena Richardson	874	11.0	
Majority		1,088	13.7	
Turnout		7,952		

Blenheim
Party	Candidate	Votes	%	±%
Labour	Albert Smith	2,206	50.5	
Conservative	Sydney Webster	2,163	49.5	
Majority		43	1.0	
Turnout		4,369		

Bramley
Party	Candidate	Votes	%	±%
Labour	Ernest Kavanagh	4,960	55.6	
Conservative	James Reginald Herbert Greaves	2,913	32.6	
Liberal	Fred Plews	1,052	11.8	
Majority		2,047	23.0	
Turnout		8,925		

Burmantofts
Party	Candidate	Votes	%	±%
Labour	William Jackson	2,440	80.0	
Labour	Thomas McKellar	2,408		
Conservative	John Claude Bidgood	610	20.0	
Conservative	George Hedley Monkman	585		
Majority		1,798	60.0	
Turnout		3,050		

Central
Party	Candidate	Votes	%	±%
Labour	William Spence	2,194	69.1	
Conservative	Philip Kay Stead	983	30.9	
Majority		1,211	38.2	
Turnout		3,177		

Cross Gates & Temple Newsam
Party	Candidate	Votes	%	±%
Labour	William Lunn	5,701	57.5	
Labour	Richard Thomas	5,485		
Conservative	Herbert Adamson	4,207	42.5	
Conservative	Morris Tomlinson	3,907		
Majority		1,278	15.0	
Turnout		9,908		

East Hunslet
Party	Candidate	Votes	%	±%
Labour	Frederic Naylor	2,807	68.0	
Labour	Robert Peart	2,608		
Liberal	Alfred Kennedy	1,318	32.0	
Liberal	Albert Hope	1,169		
Majority		1,290	36.0	
Turnout		4,125		

Far Headingley
Party	Candidate	Votes	%	±%
Conservative	Ernest Osborne	5,607	66.8	
Conservative	John William Richardson Hargrave	5,540		
Labour	David Beevers	2,791	33.2	
Labour	Ms. Irene Morley Clayden	2,730		
Majority		2,749	33.6	
Turnout		8,398		

Farnley & Wortley
Party	Candidate	Votes	%	±%
Labour	Leonard Wood Wilkinson	4,802	65.5	
Labour	Charles Victor Woods	4,636		
Conservative	John Francis Power	2,533	34.5	
Conservative	Frank Carter	2,397		
Majority		2,103	31.0	
Turnout		7,335		

Harehills
Party	Candidate	Votes	%	±%
Labour	Ms. Alice Jolley	4,700	60.7	
Labour	Kenneth Arthur Muir	4,374		
Conservative	James Walker Booth	2,199	28.4	
Conservative	George Astle	2,142		
Liberal	Thomas Edmund Hodgson	839	10.8	
Liberal	Arthur Gerald Shackleton	675		
Majority		2,175	32.3	
Turnout		7,738		

Holbeck North
Party	Candidate	Votes	%	±%
Labour	Cornelius Fitzgerald	1,152	76.5	
Labour	James William Veitch	1,138		
Liberal	Walter Holdsworth	354	23.5	
Liberal	Gilbert Whittaker Storey	331		
Majority		784	53.0	
Turnout		1,506		

Holbeck South
Party	Candidate	Votes	%	±%
Labour	Joseph Thomas Dickinson	3,010	69.3	
Labour	William Maldwyn Jones	2,934		
Conservative	Harold Stanley Jowett	767	17.7	
Liberal	Wilfred Ernest Hopper	568	13.1	
Liberal	Bertie Morris Turner	489		
Majority		2,167	51.6	
Turnout		4,345		

Hunslet Carr & Middleton
Party	Candidate	Votes	%	±%
Labour	Charles Jenkinson	6,652	80.1	
Labour	James Edward Hodkinson	6,424		
Conservative	Andrew William Colin Cumming	1,657	19.9	
Majority		4,767	60.1	
Turnout		8,309		

Hyde Park
Party	Candidate	Votes	%	±%
Conservative	Percy Horner Hutchinson	3,497	57.2	
Conservative	Frederic Walker	3,397		
Labour	Ms. Annie Margaret Maud Happold	2,620	42.8	
Labour	Herbert Kemp	2,424		
Majority		777	14.3	
Turnout		6,117	47.6	

Kirkstall
Party	Candidate	Votes	%	±%
Labour	Marshall Clegg	4,978	58.5	
Labour	George Clifford Bell	4,885		
Conservative	Archibold Caton Scarr	2,701	31.7	
Conservative	Charles Lockwood Turnbull	2,569		
Liberal	Arthur Lawrence Braithwaite Childe	834	9.8	
Liberal	Frederic Melville Fisher	718		
Majority		2,184	26.7	
Turnout		8,513		

Mill Hill & South
Party	Candidate	Votes	%	±%
Labour	Ms. Gertrude Bray	1,387	57.0	
Labour	Harry Holdsworth	1,380		
Conservative	Herbert Preston Peacock	1,048	43.0	
Conservative	Alfred Edward Weaver	1,032		
Majority		332	13.9	
Turnout		2,435		

North
Party	Candidate	Votes	%	±%
Conservative	Edward John Loy Wooler	5,213	57.5	
Conservative	Ms. Dorothy Murphy	4,967		
Labour	Ms. Lillian Hammond	2,605	28.7	
Labour	Norman Davy	2,477		
Liberal	Winifred Francis Underhill	1,247	13.8	
Liberal	Albert Edward Marshall	1,238		
Majority		2,362	28.8	
Turnout		9,065		

Osmondthorpe
Party	Candidate	Votes	%	±%
Labour	Ms. May Firth	3,817	76.0	
Labour	Fred Potter	3,781		
Conservative	Albert Edward Baker	1,204	24.0	
Conservative	Herbert Reginald Stott	1,143		
Majority		2,577	52.0	
Turnout		5,021		

Potternewton
Party	Candidate	Votes	%	±%
Labour	Charles Benjamin Bradley	3,381	56.6	
Labour	Karl Cyril Cohen	3,197		
Labour	Barnet Weinrib	3,121		
Conservative	James Thomas Mulley	2,595	43.4	
Conservative	Charles Henry Driver	2,587		
Conservative	Eldon Jenkins Fenton	2,518		
Majority		526	13.2	
Turnout		5,976		

Richmond Hill
Party	Candidate	Votes	%	±%
Labour	Willie Fowler	Unopposed	N/A	N/A

Roundhay
Party	Candidate	Votes	%	±%
Conservative	Francis Eric Tetley	5,661	62.1	
Conservative	Alexander Ayrton Watt	5,257		
Labour	Ms. Ivy Veitch	3,462	37.9	
Labour	William Merritt	3,434		
Majority		1,795	24.1	
Turnout		9,123		

Upper Armley
Party	Candidate	Votes	%	±%
Labour	Ernest Blackburn	3,738	59.0	
Labour	John Herbert Underwood	3,729		
Labour	William Bramham	3,719		
Conservative	Ms. Jenny Wormald	2,598	41.0	
Conservative	Edward Dean Glover	2,528		
Conservative	Matthew Farey	2,421		
Majority		1,121	18.0	
Turnout		6,336		

West Hunslet
Party	Candidate	Votes	%	±%
Labour	Harold Watson	3,725	71.0	
Conservative	Percival Arthur Woodward	960	18.3	
Liberal	George Petch	560	10.7	
Majority		2,765	52.7	
Turnout		5,245		

Westfield
Party	Candidate	Votes	%	±%
Labour	William Villiers Stoner	1,551	74.1	
Labour	Ms. Edith Youngman	1,528		
Conservative	Ms. Mabel Burton	541	25.9	
Conservative	Stanley Hodgson Doyle	527		
Majority		987	48.3	
Turnout		2,092		

Woodhouse
Party	Candidate	Votes	%	±%
Labour	Ms. Mary Pearce	2,730	62.4	
Conservative	George Sydney Taylor	1,076	24.6	
Liberal	Ernest Lightowler	568	13.0	
Majority		1,654	37.8	
Turnout		4,374		
