= 1947 Leeds City Council election =

English local election

The 1947 Leeds municipal elections were held on Saturday 1 November 1947, with one third of the seats, as well as a vacancy in Potternewton, up for election. With no Liberal candidate this time, East Hunslet went unopposed.

Following favourable national patterns, the swing of two percent to the Conservatives helped the party decisively win the popular vote and, in part thanks to a spike in turnout to 55.3%, gain new post-war records in both share and votes. Despite a deficit of over 20,000 votes and losses totalling seven seats to the Conservatives, Labour were still able to pip them in seats won by an additional seat. As such, Labour's majority was cut by close to a third, but remained safe at 30.

== Election result ==
Leeds local election result 1947
Party	Seats	Gains	Losses	Net gain/loss	Seats %	Votes %	Votes	+/−
Labour	14	0	7	-7	51.8	42.8	81,559	-2.1
Conservative	13	7	0	+7	48.1	53.5	101,832	+2.1
Liberal	0	0	0	0	0.0	3.0	5,774	+0.1
Communist	0	0	0	0	0.0	0.7	1,332	-0.0

The result had the following consequences for the total number of seats on the council after the elections:

Party	Previous council		New council	
Party	Cllr	Ald	Cllr	Ald
Labour	59	15	52	15
Conservatives	19	11	26	11
Total	78	26	78	26
Total	104		104	
Working majority	40	4	26	4
Working majority	44		30	

== Ward results ==
Armley & Wortley
Party	Candidate	Votes	%	±%
Labour	G. Coan	3,412	63.6	N/A
Conservative	G. Atkinson	1,955	36.4	N/A
Majority		1,457	27.2	N/A
Turnout		5,367		N/A

Beeston
Party	Candidate	Votes	%	±%
Conservative	P. Woodward	4,776	49.4	+3.7
Labour	E. Whitehead	3,840	39.7	−5.9
Liberal	A. Whitaker	1,053	10.9	+2.1
Majority		936	9.7	+9.6
Turnout		9,669		

Blenheim
Party	Candidate	Votes	%	±%
Conservative	E. Lister	3,853	56.5	+1.0
Labour	A. D'Arcy	2,343	34.3	−10.2
Liberal	M. Allen	626	9.2	+9.2
Majority		1,510	22.2	+11.2
Turnout		6,822		

Bramley
Party	Candidate	Votes	%	±%
Labour	H. Womersley	5,134	46.5	−8.4
Conservative	A. Baker	4,709	42.6	−2.4
Liberal	Ms Booth	1,199	10.9	+10.9
Majority		425	3.9	−6.0
Turnout		11,042		

Burmantofts
Party	Candidate	Votes	%	±%
Labour	W. Shutt	2,573	67.7	N/A
Conservative	C. Kirby	1,226	32.3	N/A
Majority		1,347	35.4	N/A
Turnout		3,799		N/A

Central
Party	Candidate	Votes	%	±%
Labour	J. Walsh	2,043	54.2	−8.2
Conservative	F. Morat	1,729	45.8	+8.2
Majority		314	8.3	−16.5
Turnout		3,772		

Cross Gates & Temple Newsam
Party	Candidate	Votes	%	±%
Conservative	R. Bell	8,052	57.4	+0.0
Labour	R. Thomas	5,965	42.6	−0.0
Majority		2,087	14.8	+0.0
Turnout		14,017		

East Hunslet
Party	Candidate	Votes	%	±%
Labour	H. Mayhew	Unopposed	N/A	N/A
Labour hold		Swing	N/A	

Far Headingley
Party	Candidate	Votes	%	±%
Conservative	J. Hargrave	9,236	81.0	+8.7
Labour	A. Tallant	2,169	19.0	−1.0
Majority		7,067	62.0	+9.7
Turnout		11,405		

Farnley & Wortley
Party	Candidate	Votes	%	±%
Labour	J. Wallbanks	5,188	52.3	−5.7
Conservative	C. Horner	4,738	47.7	+5.7
Majority		450	4.5	−11.4
Turnout		9,926		

Harehills
Party	Candidate	Votes	%	±%
Conservative	W. Power	5,310	51.2	+4.6
Labour	K. Muir	5,060	48.8	−4.6
Majority		250	2.4	−4.4
Turnout		10,370		

Holbeck North
Party	Candidate	Votes	%	±%
Labour	J. Veitch	1,155	59.9	N/A
Conservative	A. Parkinson	503	26.1	N/A
Liberal	W. Holdsworth	269	14.0	N/A
Majority		652	33.8	N/A
Turnout		1,927		N/A

Holbeck South
Party	Candidate	Votes	%	±%
Labour	W. Jones	2,916	55.6	−17.1
Conservative	H. Drake	1,757	33.5	+33.5
Liberal	W. Hopper	568	10.8	−16.4
Majority		1,159	22.1	−23.5
Turnout		5,241		

Hunslet Carr & Middleton
Party	Candidate	Votes	%	±%
Labour	J. Hodkinson	6,133	64.8	N/A
Conservative	J. Walton	3,326	35.2	N/A
Majority		2,807	29.7	N/A
Turnout		9,459		N/A

Hyde Park
Party	Candidate	Votes	%	±%
Conservative	F. Walker	5,644	72.5	+3.7
Labour	G. Issott	2,137	27.5	−3.7
Majority		3,507	45.1	+7.4
Turnout		7,781		

Kirkstall
Party	Candidate	Votes	%	±%
Conservative	H. Sellers	5,021	49.8	+4.3
Labour	M. Malcolm	4,101	40.7	−13.7
Liberal	L. Spencer	638	6.3	+6.3
Communist	R. Huffingley	313	3.1	+3.1
Majority		920	9.1	+0.2
Turnout		10,073		

Mill Hill & South
Party	Candidate	Votes	%	±%
Conservative	H. Jowitt	1,538	52.5	+1.0
Labour	H. Holdsworth	1,394	47.5	−1.0
Majority		144	4.9	+1.9
Turnout		2,932		

North
Party	Candidate	Votes	%	±%
Conservative	D. Murphy	9,724	80.5	+2.9
Labour	N. Davey	2,349	19.5	−2.9
Majority		7,375	61.1	+5.8
Turnout		12,073		

Osmondthorpe
Party	Candidate	Votes	%	±%
Labour	M. Fish	4,257	63.1	N/A
Conservative	T. Nipe	2,491	36.9	N/A
Majority		1,766	26.2	N/A
Turnout		6,748		N/A

Potternewton
Party	Candidate	Votes	%	±%
Conservative	J. Bidgood	4,468	57.5	+2.5
Conservative	C. Driver	4,442		
Labour	K. Cohen	2,551	32.8	−1.7
Labour	R. Peart	2,401		
Communist	B. Ramelson	753	9.7	−0.8
Majority		1,917	24.7	+4.2
Turnout		7,772		

Richmond Hill
Party	Candidate	Votes	%	±%
Labour	W. Fowler	1,900	69.3	−20.5
Conservative	R. Eden	840	30.7	+30.7
Majority		1,060	38.7	−41.1
Turnout		2,740		

Roundhay
Party	Candidate	Votes	%	±%
Conservative	C. Monkman	10,330	77.0	+0.5
Labour	A. King	3,083	23.0	−0.5
Majority		7,247	54.0	+1.1
Turnout		13,413		

Upper Armley
Party	Candidate	Votes	%	±%
Conservative	J. Hiley	4,386	54.1	+8.9
Labour	J. Underwood	3,720	45.9	−2.3
Majority		666	8.2	+5.2
Turnout		8,106		

West Hunslet
Party	Candidate	Votes	%	±%
Labour	A. Adamson	3,343	52.4	−13.5
Conservative	J. Farrell	1,865	29.2	−1.5
Liberal	A. Smith	903	14.2	+14.2
Communist	F. Warburton	266	4.2	+0.9
Majority		1,478	23.2	−12.0
Turnout		6,377		

Westfield
Party	Candidate	Votes	%	±%
Labour	E. Youngman	1,693	54.4	−7.1
Conservative	M. Gledhill	1,417	45.6	+7.1
Majority		276	8.9	−14.1
Turnout		3,110		

Woodhouse
Party	Candidate	Votes	%	±%
Labour	H. Bretherick	3,100	47.3	−9.4
Conservative	G. Taylor	2,938	44.8	+1.5
Liberal	Ms. Hobson	518	7.9	+7.9
Majority		162	2.5	−10.9
Turnout		6,556		
