= Blenheim, Leeds =

Coordinates: 53.8083°N 1.5480°W

Blenheim
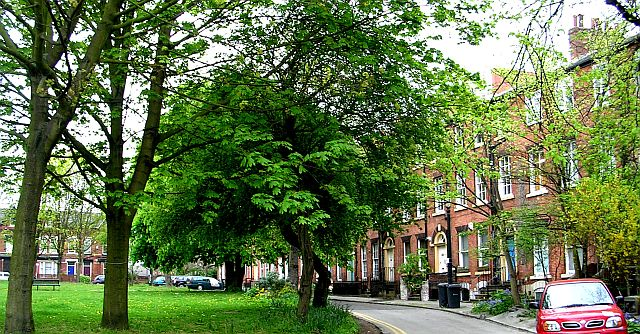
- Blenheim Square

- Location within West Yorkshire
- Metropolitan borough: City of Leeds
- Metropolitan county: West Yorkshire
- Region: Yorkshire and the Humber
- Country: England
- Sovereign state: United Kingdom
- Post town: LEEDS
- Postcode district: LS2
- Dialling code: 0113
- Police: West Yorkshire
- Fire: West Yorkshire
- Ambulance: Yorkshire
- UK Parliament: Leeds Central and Headingley

Blenheim is a small area of inner-city Leeds, West Yorkshire, England. It is situated north of the city centre between Little London, Lovell Park and Woodhouse and is generally made up of early 20th century terraced housing. Blenheim falls within the Little London and Woodhouse ward of Leeds City Council.

The Georgian/Victorian Blenheim Square is a Conservation Area.
