= Woodhouse, Leeds =

Area of Leeds, England

Coordinates: 53°48′46″N 1°33′33″W

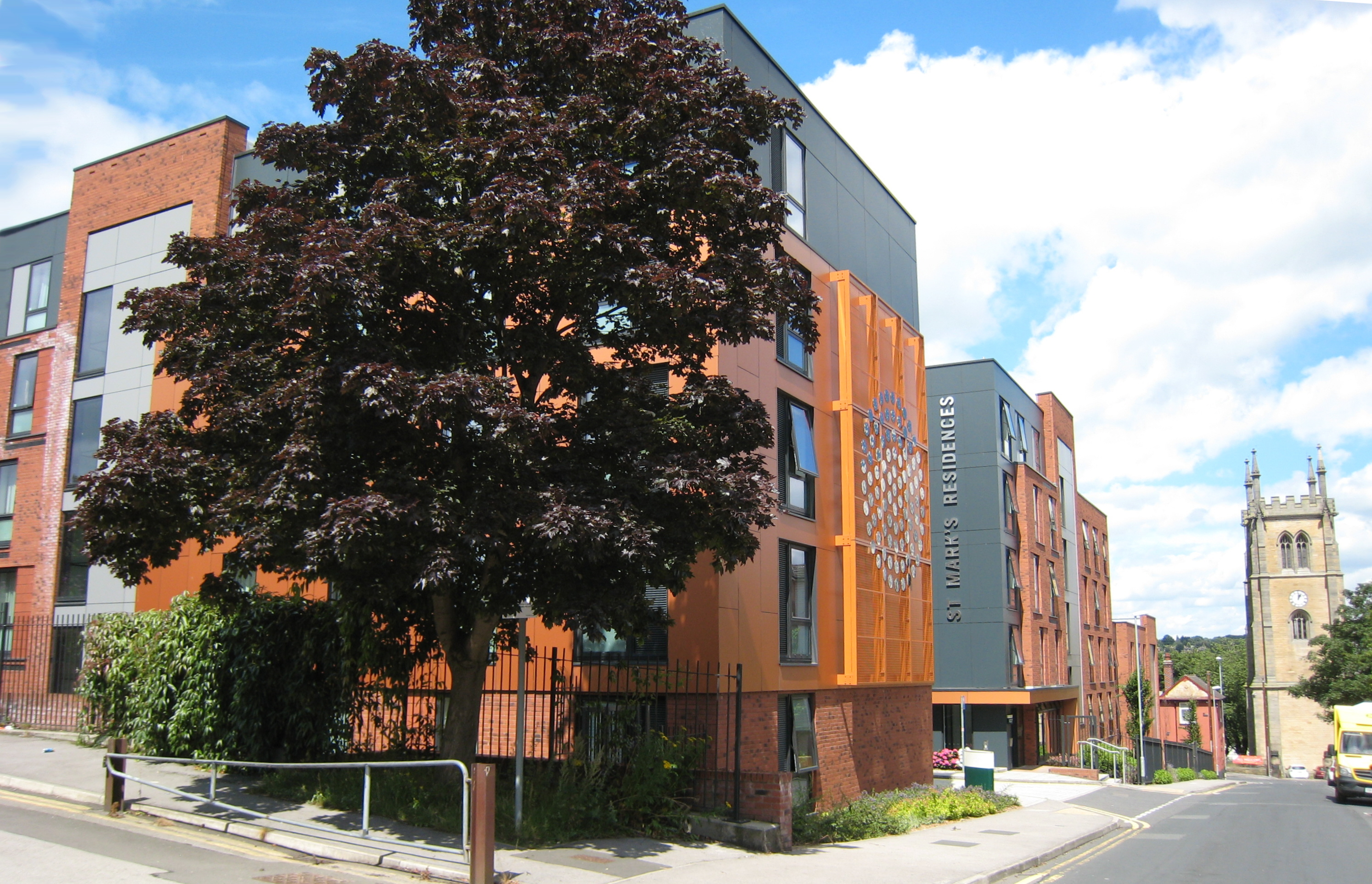
St Mark's student residences with older house and St Mark's Church, looking down St Mark's Street - towards St Mark's Road

Woodhouse is a largely residential area just north of the city centre of Leeds and close to the University of Leeds. The area considered as Woodhouse is partly in the Little London and Woodhouse ward and partly in the Headingley & Hyde Park ward of City of Leeds metropolitan district.

== History ==
The name Woodhouse is first attested around the 1170s as Wd(e)husa, Wd(e)huse, and Wudeusum. It is likely to derive from Old English wudu 'wood' and hūs 'houses'. Locals refer to it as Wudhus. It was described in 1853 as a "large and handsome village".

The original Woodhouse area of Leeds extended in a wide horseshoe arc travelling north from Burley Street (where it is known as Little Woodhouse), up along Clarendon Road, including the current site of the University of Leeds, across Woodhouse Moor (now a public park), then on towards its northernmost boundary, the steeply banked woodland of Woodhouse Ridge part of the Meanwood Valley Trail, and the Forest of Leeds, where the area was known as Woodhouse Cliff to the west and Woodhouse Carr to the south-east. Ordnance Survey maps for 1893 and 1921 mark an area to the west of Meanwood Road between Buslingthorpe Lane and Buslingthorpe Green as "Woodhouse Carr".

During the Second World War, the Institution Street (now Holborn Approach) area was accidentally bombed by the German Luftwaffe during night-time blackout air-raid unsuccessful attempts to destroy a nearby industrial target. Several buildings were hit and as a result three people at the bottom end of the street were killed.

The Chemic Tavern is a public house situated in the heart of Woodhouse. It was established in the 1840s and named after Johnson's Chemical Works. The factory was demolished in the 1890s but the pub remained.

== Architecture ==
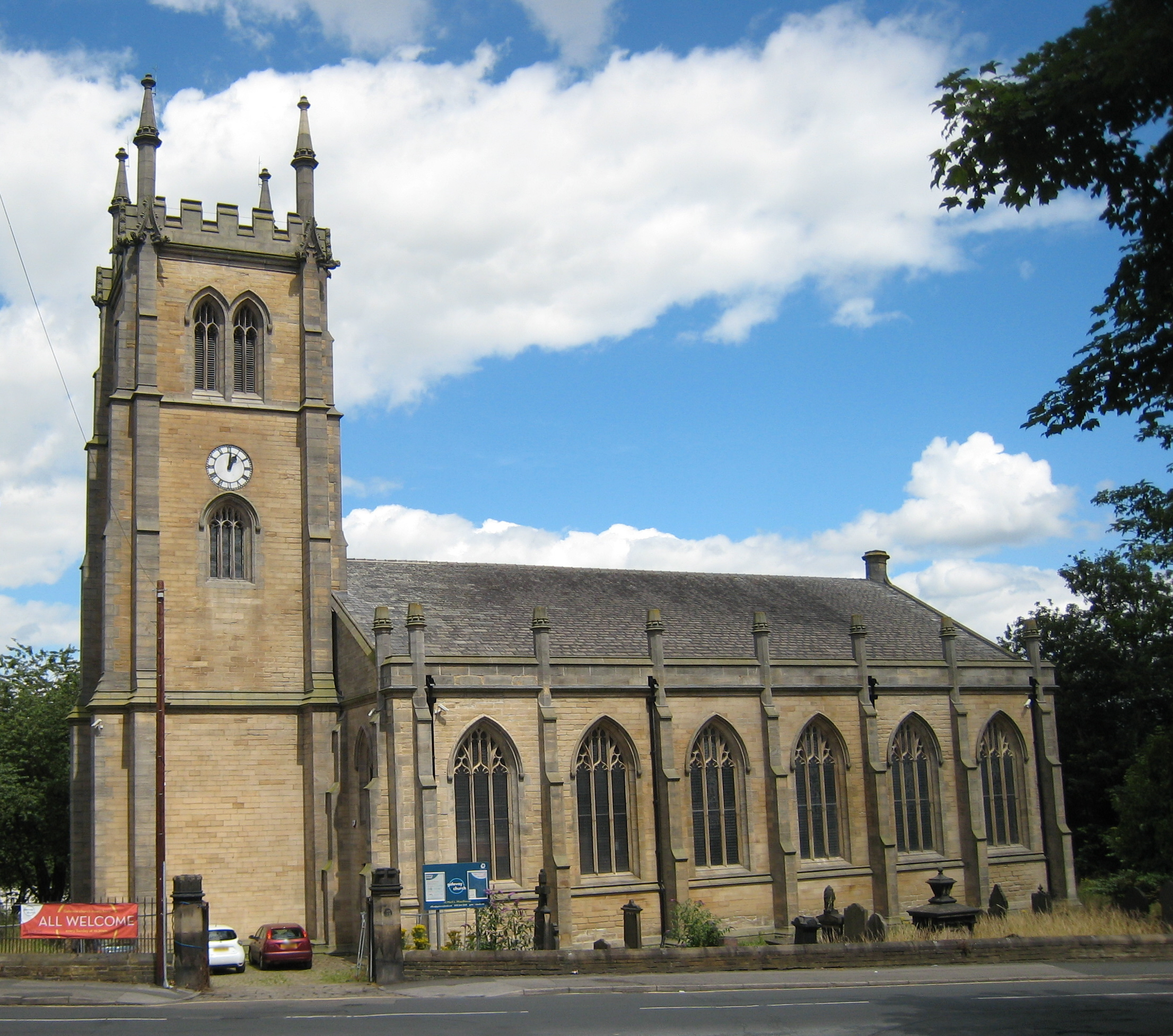
Gateway Church (formerly St Mark's Parish Church).

Older residences are largely redbrick back-to-back and 'through' terraced housing. There are also concrete council houses (the Holborn Estate) and a mixture of more modern buildings, particularly student accommodation. There is a small amount of light industry. The former Anglican parish church of St Mark's, which has been renovated by Gateway Church Leeds, lends its name to nearby streets and the St Mark's Residences of the university. The church building was used as the exterior of The Parish Church of St Mathews in the TV comedy series The Beiderbecke Affair. Other older buildings include Quarry Mount Primary School, and several public houses. On Holborn Approach (formerly Institution Street) is the Temperance Hall and Mechanics' Institute which was opened by Samuel Smiles in 1851 as an alternative to local pubs for socialising. It cost £900 and is of red bricks with yellow sandstone details. Over the years it has been used for various purposes. It is now used as Holborn Church.

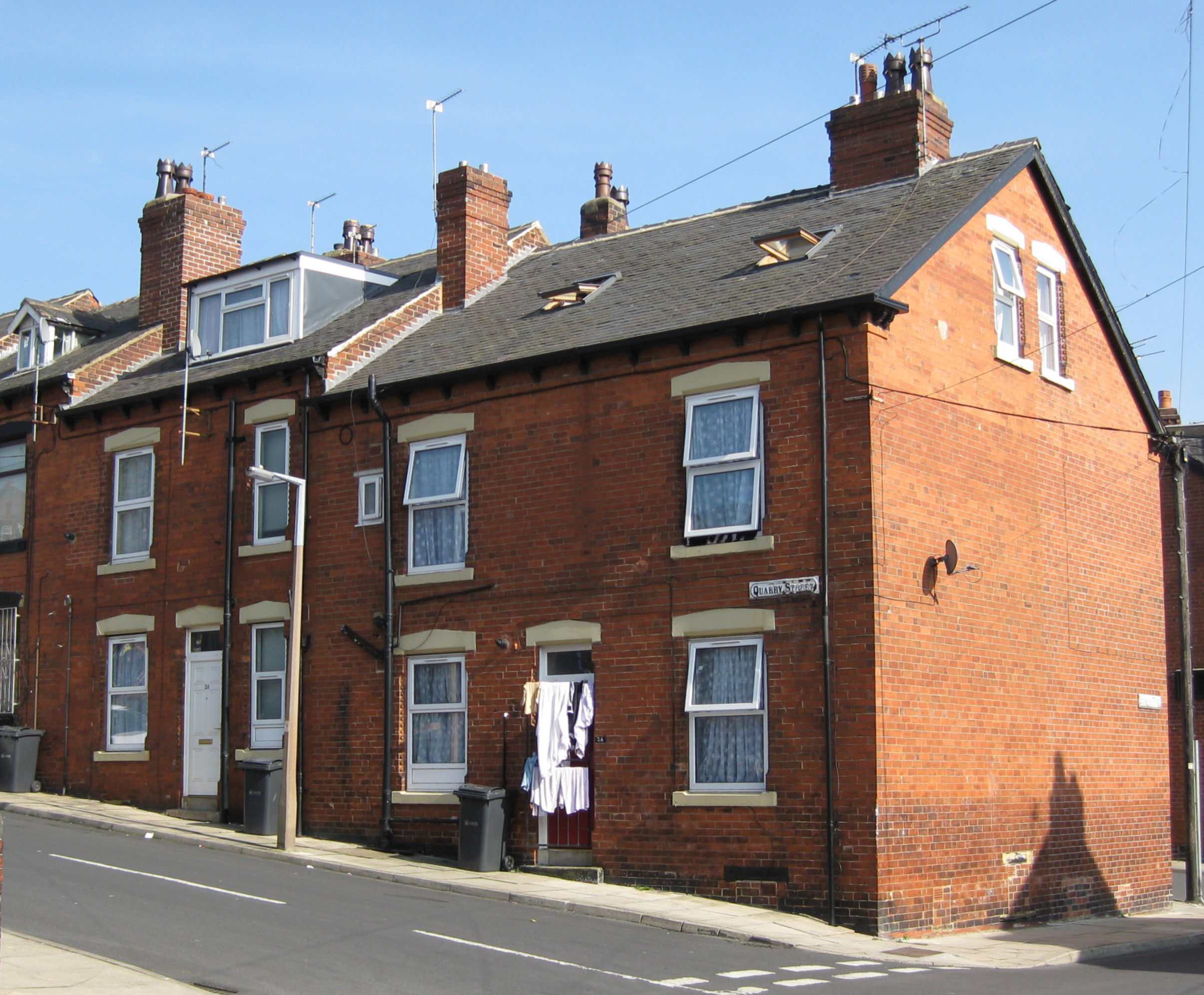
Quarry Street

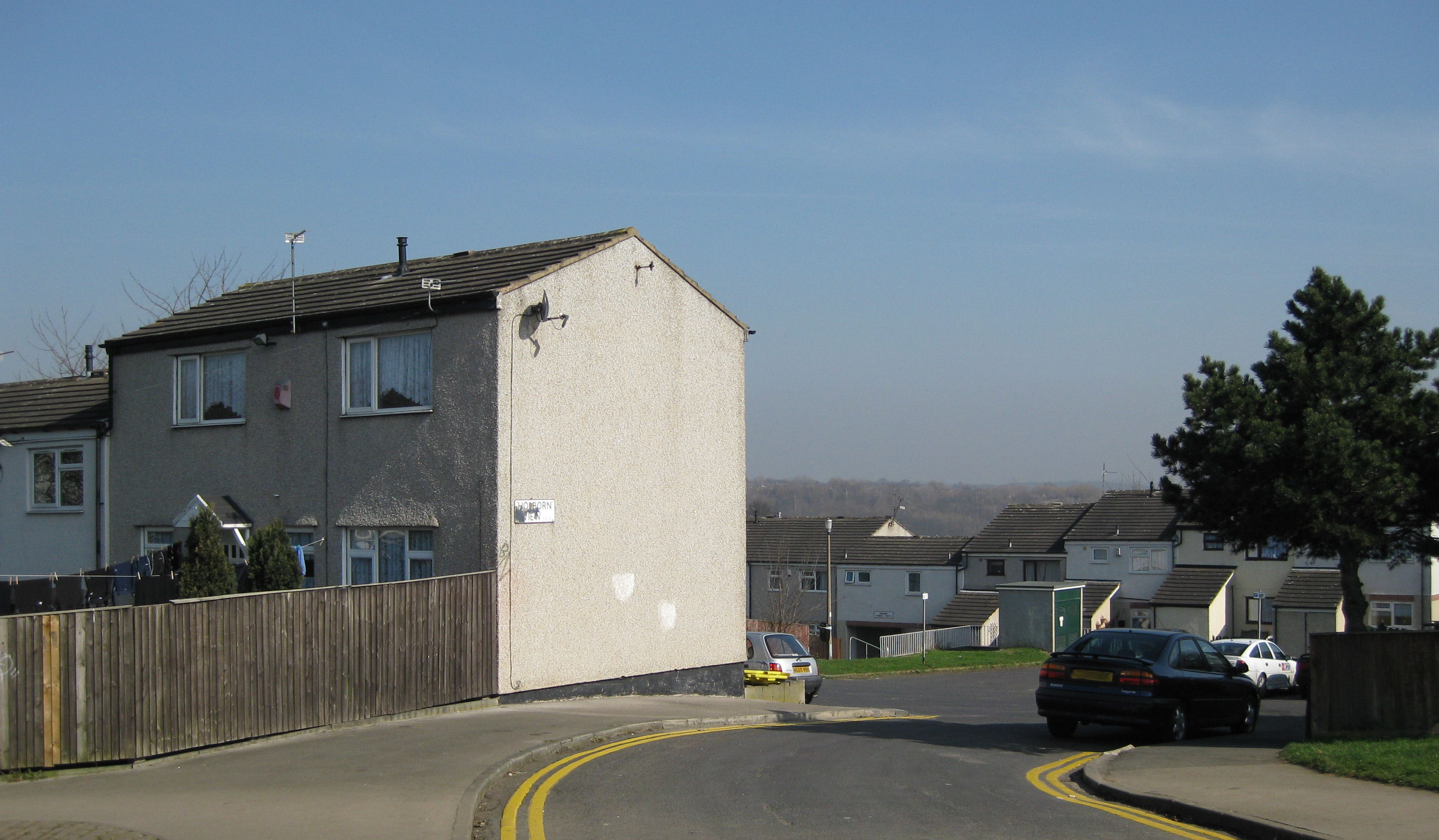
The Holborn Estate

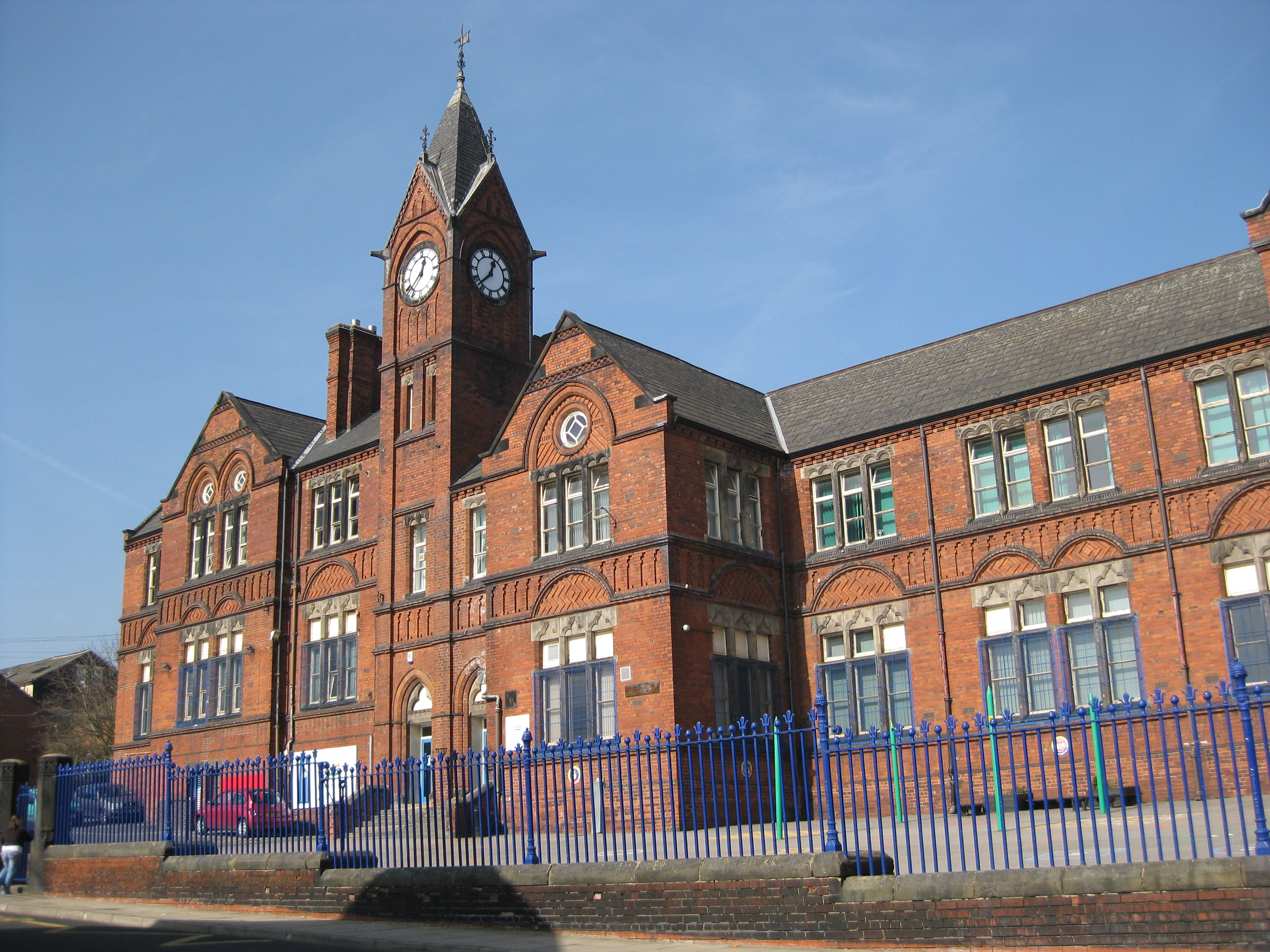
Quarry Mount Primary School

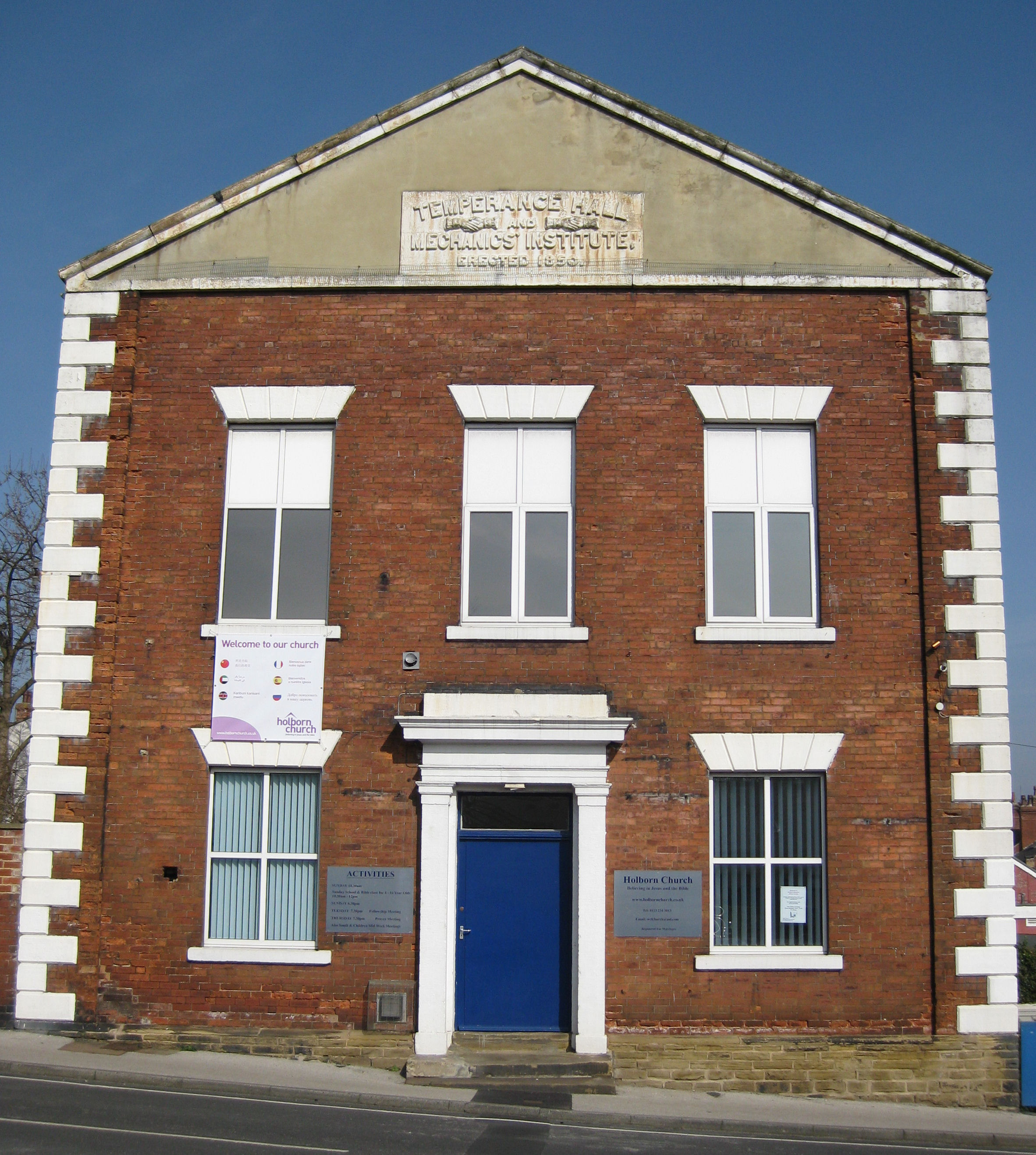
Temperance Hall (1850), Holborn Approach

== Notable people ==
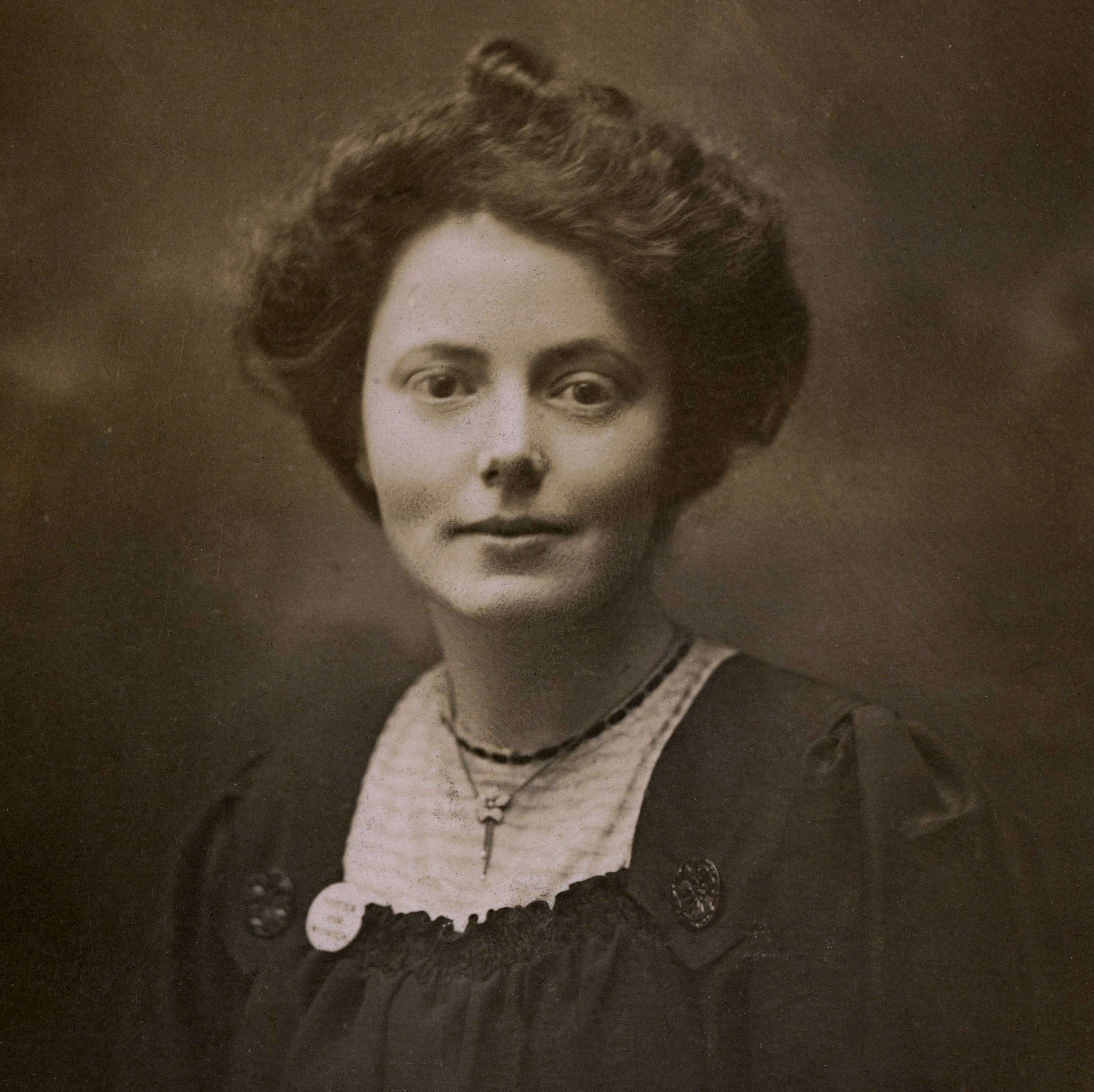
Mary Gawthorpe, 1908

The suffragette, socialist and trade unionist Mary Gawthorpe was born in Woodhouse in 1881.

Alice Mann, the radical printer and bookseller had moved to a house on St Mark's Terrace by 1851.

The author and reformer Samuel Smiles moved to live on Woodhouse Cliff in 1847. He was the first president of the Woodhouse Mechanics Institution.

== See also ==
- Listed buildings in Leeds (Hyde Park and Woodhouse)
