= Steander =

Urban area in Leeds, England

Coordinates: 53.794289°N 1.532303°W

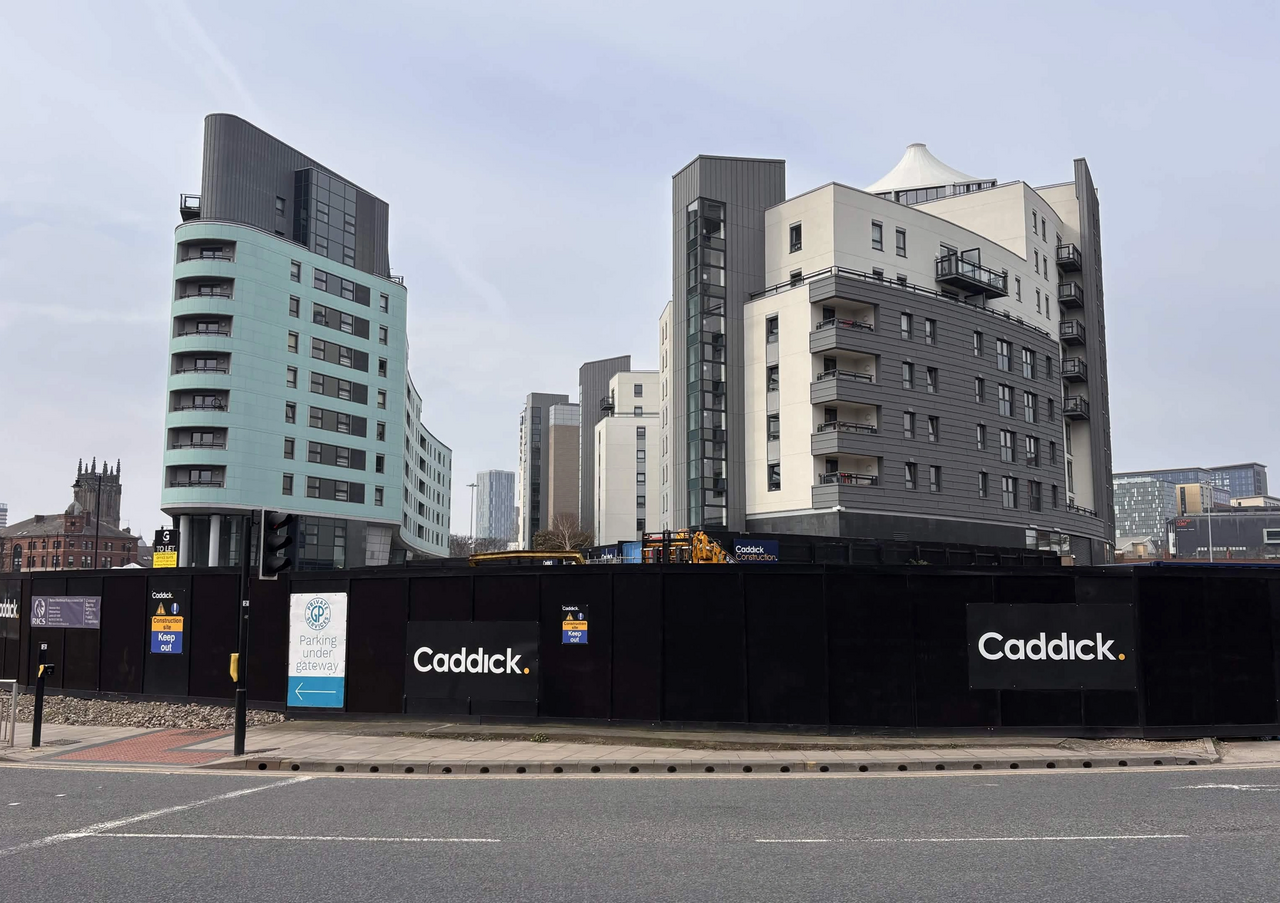
- The Gateway complex, sat on the site of the old Steander area

- Location within West Yorkshire
- OS grid reference: SE 30889 33228
  - London: 168.75 mi (271.58 km)
- Metropolitan borough: Leeds
- Metropolitan county: West Yorkshire
- Region: Yorkshire and the Humber
- Country: England
- Sovereign state: United Kingdom
- Post town: LEEDS
- Postcode district: LS9
- Police: West Yorkshire
- Fire: West Yorkshire
- Ambulance: Yorkshire
- UK Parliament: Leeds South

Steander was street and a small inner city area of the city of Leeds, in the county of West Yorkshire, England, located on the eastern edge of Leeds city centre, between The Calls, York Road (A64 road), the River Aire, and the district of Richmond Hill. The appropriate City of Leeds ward is Hunslet and Riverside, with outlying areas also in Burmantofts and Richmond Hill. The area was a primarily industrial part of the city, exporting iron, wool, and timber via the directly adjacent Leeds Dock. The area eventually fell into disrepair in the 20th century due to de-industrialisation, with the final industrial unit being demolished in the early 2000s. Most of the old roads in the area were demolished in the 1970s to make way for the Leeds Inner Ring Road. Much of the area around Steander is now home to The Gateway, a mixed-use development constructed in 2006. The most recent developments in the area are the Phoenix and Altitude towers, constructed in 2024, and the upcoming Millworks development scheduled for completion in early 2027.

While the area was primarily industrial, the area did see some habitation, with a census of the city in 1891 recording 423 residents in the area.

== Etymology and Naming ==
The name Steander is believed to mean "stony place", likely stemming from the Old Norse steinn. The name likely refers to the more stony or gravelled banks of the River Aire within the area. The name refers to both an area of the city and a street which much of the area was connected to. The street is often referred to in newspapers of the time as the Steander, with a definite article.

The area between Timble Beck and the River Aire is referred to as Fearn's Island, named after the Fearn family that owned the Nether Mills on the island during the 18th century. Historically, the area has also been referred to as Far Steander or Far Steander Island, with the Steander area around its eponymous street being referred to as Near Steander.

Nowadays, Fearn's Island (typically rendered as Fearns Island, without the apostrophe) is more often used as the name of a small island in between the north bank of Steander and Leeds Dock. The island is the centre point of Leeds Locks, a core lock in the Aire and Calder Navigation, and is managed by the Canal & River Trust. The island is also sparingly Leeds Dam Island.

Although also an area of the City of Leeds, the Fearns of Fearn's Island are most likely not related to Fearnville in the north east of the city.

== Areas ==
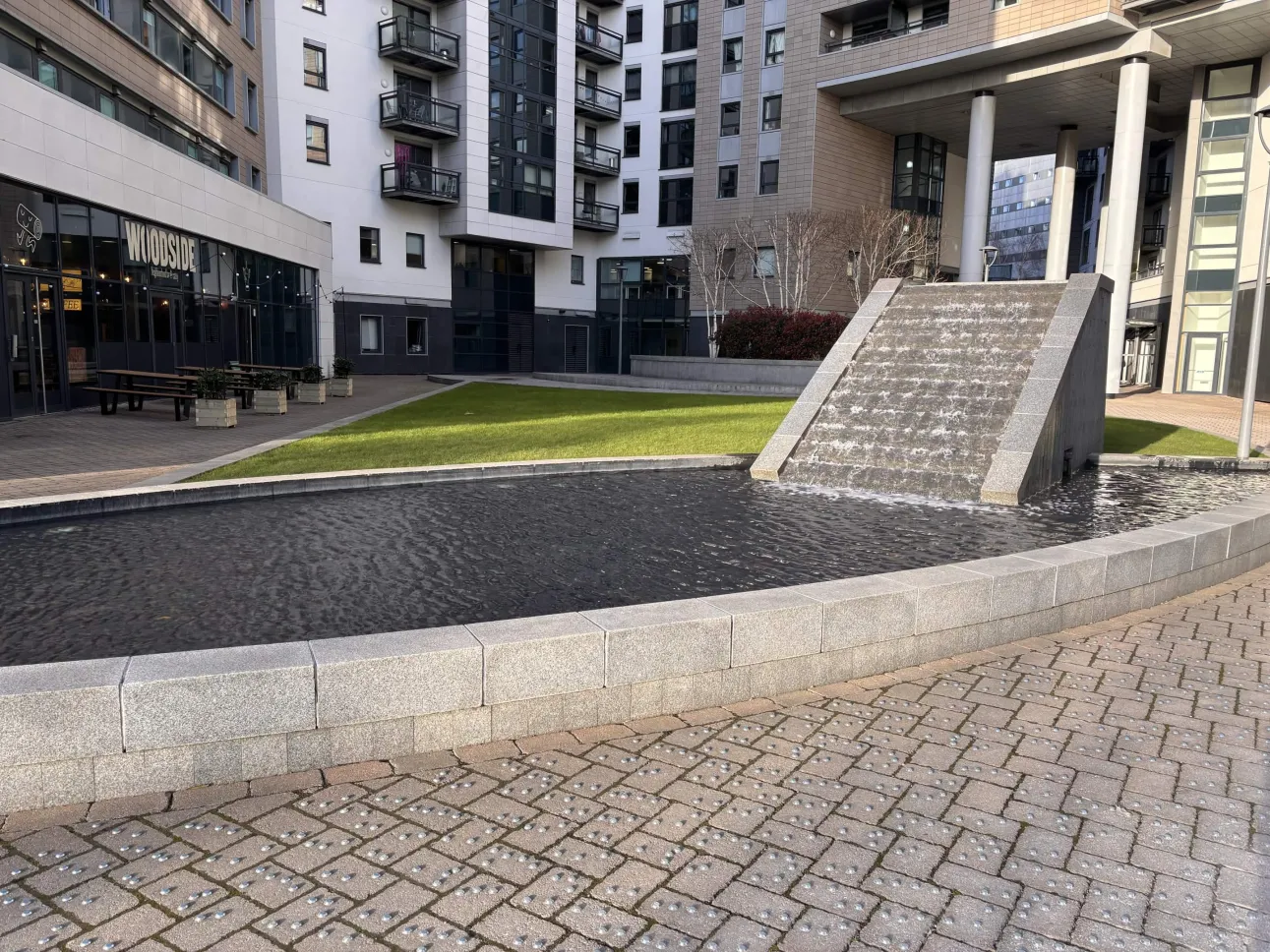
A stepped water feature found in the courtyard of The Gateway.

=== The Gateway ===
The Gateway is sizeable development sat in a large traffic island between Crown Point Road, East Street, and Marsh Lane. The complex covers 800,000 square feet, and contains apartments, office space, and an Ibis budget hotel. The development was constructed by Leeds-based property developers Scotfield, and was intended to be developed in three phases. The first phase was completed in 2006, followed by the second phase in 2009. The third phase was never completed following the 2008 financial crisis, and remained mothballed until early 2023.

The Gateway sits on the site of an old sawmill, previously owned by Howarth Timber, as well as the sites of the now demolished Steander Lane, Steander Row, and Steander Bow.

Following a downturn in the property market, The Gateway (Leeds) Ltd went into administration in 2013, followed by full liquidation in 2019. The site is now handled by a mix of landlords and owner-occupiers, though control over the site is now handled by Leeds-based real estate agents TBET Developments.

Following the Homes Cladding Safety Scheme in 2023, the external facades of the development were refurbished. As of 2026, construction and refurbishment work at the site of the original third phase of development is still ongoing, handled by Wetherby-based Construction firm Caddick.

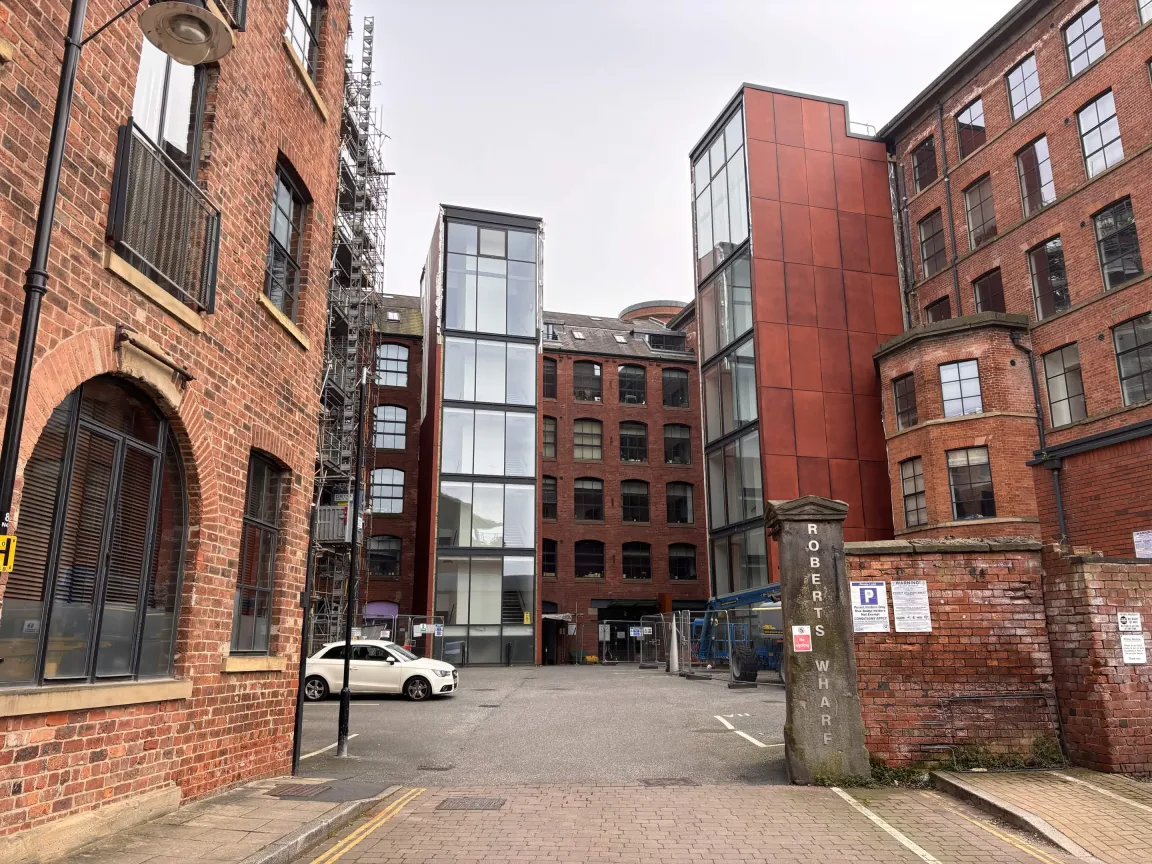
Robert's Wharf, one of the principal wharves in Fearn's Island.

=== Fearn's Island ===
Fearn's Island, also historically called Far Steander Island, is a small area of former industrial sites between East Street and the River Aire. Formerly an area populated by dye works and timber wharves, many of the industrial sites have become grade-listed buildings and have been refurbished into offices and apartments. Restoration in the area began in 2003 and has since been successful, particularly at the redeveloped Fearn's Island Mills, which won various architectural awards in 2005 and 2006, with a stone plaque on the building recognising these achievements.

The principal wharves in the area are Fearn's Wharf, Merchant's Quay, and Rose Wharf. Despite regeneration in the area, the name Fearn's Island as an the area for the city has fallen out of common use. During restoration of the area in 2003 and 2004, the name seems to be almost exclusively spelled incorrectly in advertisements, advertised as Fearn Island, Fearne Island, and Fearne's Island.

Fearn's Island was also originally the name of the street that ran through the island. Though, by 1920, it fell out of use as a street name, replaced with the name Neptune Street. Nowadays, name Fearn's Island appears on some maps over the junction at South Accommodation Road in Cross Green, at the western terminus of the A63 road.

=== Leeds Dam Island ===
Leeds Dam Island is a river island in the middle of the River Aire, between the banks of Leeds Dock and Fearn's Island. The island was once home to small mills and other industrial sites, as well as the western edge of Leeds Dam and Leeds Locks. The northern half of the island is a nature reserve, home to multiple beehives, as well as small communities of otters and herons. As of 2026, there are proposals from the Canal & River Trust to turn part of the area into a community space, though this has received backlash from local councillors.

At some point, the name Fearns Island came to refer to the river island, rather than the series of wharves. The Canal & River Trust typically refer to the island as Fearns Island, often without the apostrophe.

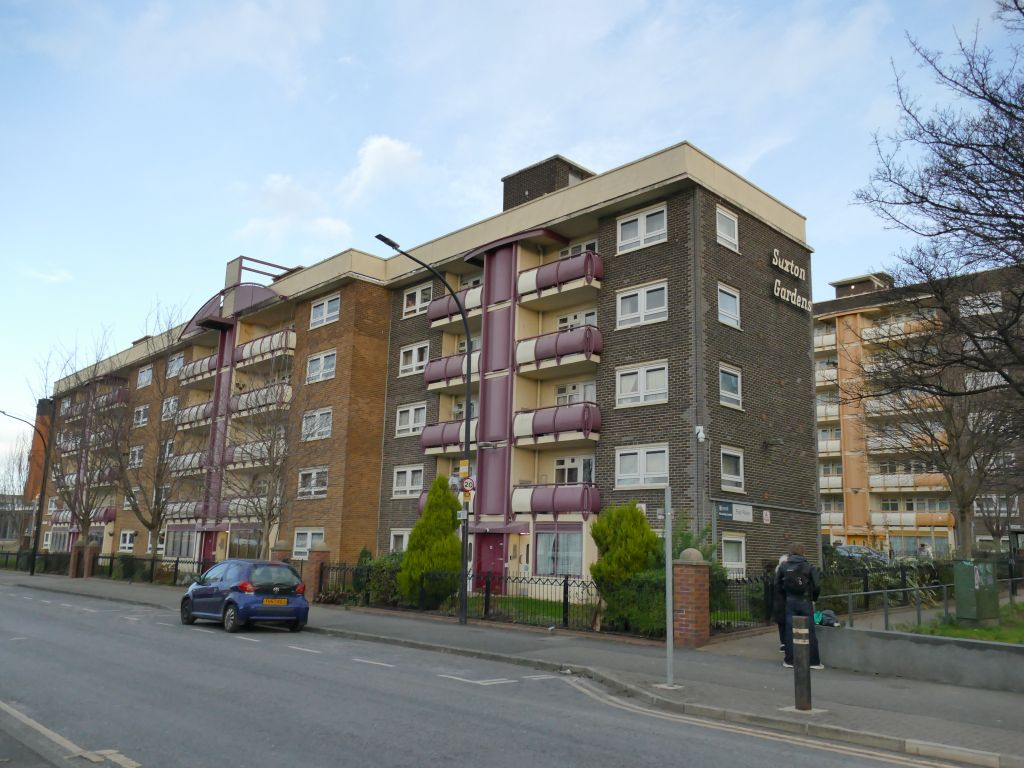
1960s apartment buildings in Saxton Gardens.

=== Saxton Gardens ===
Saxton Gardens is an estate directly east of Quarry Hill, initially built as a council estate in the 1950s to replace Victorian row housing in the Bank area.

Two of the apartment buildings eventually fell into disrepair, though have since been redeveloped by property developers Urban Splash. Completed in 2008, the development is now known simply as Saxton. The West Yorkshire Combined Authority has also pledged to develop 204 apartments in the area. Despite this, the area still experiences widespread neglect and poverty, with residents referring to the area as "the Forgotten Estate." Nowadays, Saxton Gardens is more associated with the Richmond Hill area.

=== Bank ===
The area between Saxton Gardens and York Road has historically been referred to as Bank referring to its steep, sloping landscape. For most of its inhabited history, the area was dominated by Marsh Lane railway station, Leeds' first railway station, and its large goods yard. Historically home to a large space of row-housing, the area was once home to a large Irish immigrant population, though many moved out following demolition in the 1950s and 1960s. The area has since seen regeneration in the 21st century, with the former railway bridge becoming home to breweries and coffee shops, as well as the construction of the Phoenix and Altitude towers. The old goods yard is currently undergoing redevelopment into the Leeds Urban Village, a mixed-use development.

Penny Pocket Park, historically called Marsh Lane Recreation Ground, has historically been associated with the Bank Area.

== History ==
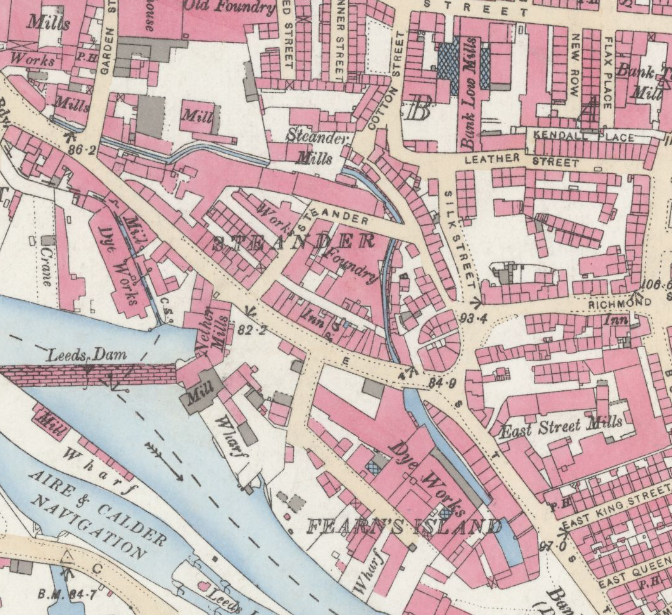
An Ordnance Survey map of Leeds from 1893, showing Steander and Fearn's Island labeled, as well as the area's industrial sites.

=== Pre-19th Century ===
Before the city's expansion during the Industrial Revolution, much of the land that would become Steander was open land separated from Leeds by an old route of Timble Beck, and was at the time outside of Leeds' manorial borough. A small hamlet named Hillhouse is recorded to have been present in the area by at least the 15th century. A large house named Ingram's Hall is recorded to have been present on the site during the late 18th century, located on the corner between Bow Street and Richmond Road and is described as a "very old house", likely predating much of the wider development found in the area.

Though industrial activity along the River Aire is recorded as far back as the 14th century, the first recorded evidence of a site around the Steander area is Nether Mills, a large mill complex primarily responsible for fulling, which are recorded as having been fully functional as early as 1636, when Leeds Dam was constructed to supply power to them. To this day, Leeds Dam is sparingly referred to as Nether Mills Weir.

In 1720, Nether Mills would come under the ownership of the Fearn family through marriage with the Dunwell family, the previous owners of the mills. Josiah Fearn, a wealthy salter and Lord of the Manor of Leeds, was the first recorded Fearn to hold Nether Mills, having married Sarah Dunwell. Fearn was later tried for the murder of Thomas Grove, a tenant of Nether Mills. He was tried at York Castle and hanged on 25 March 1749.

Nether Mills would be passed down to Thomas Fearn, son of Josiah, and would stay in the Fearn family's holdings until at least 1803.

=== Industrial Revolution ===
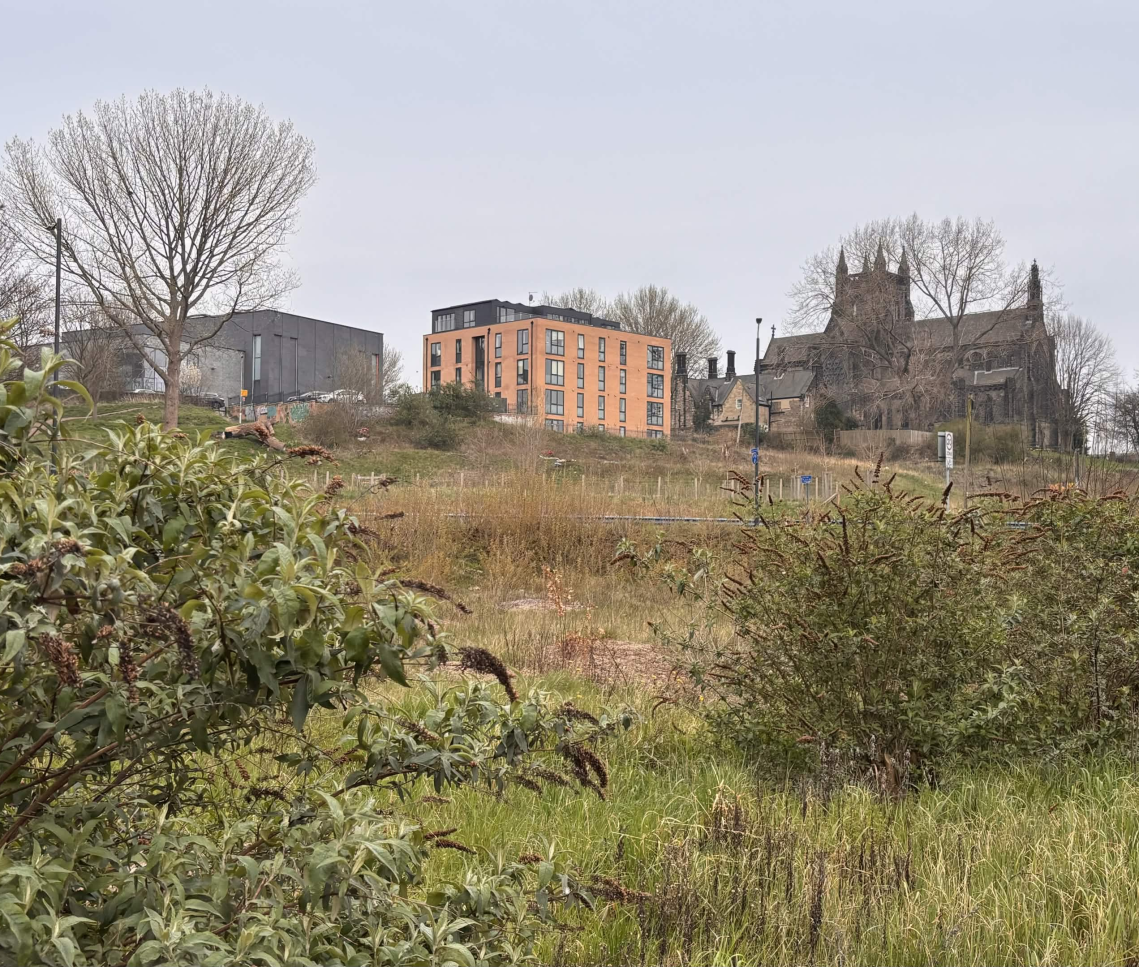
Brownfield land on the edge of the Steander area, looking towards Richmond Hill.

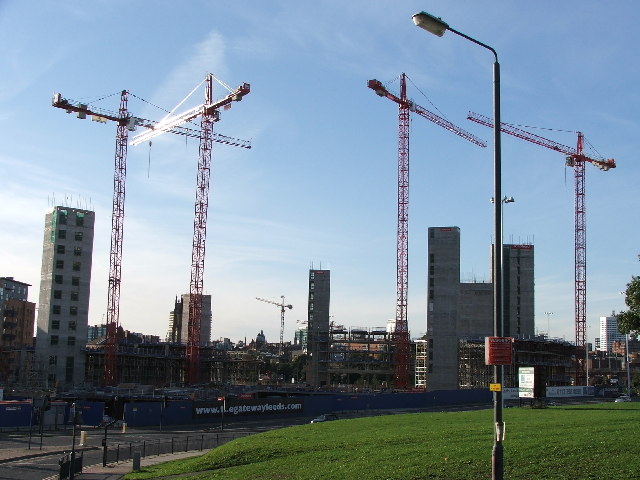
Construction on The Gateway development taken from East Street, taken September 2005.

Maps of the early 19th century show rapid expansion 1815 and 1840, likely in part due to opening of the Leeds and Selby Railway, and their newly built station at Marsh Lane. The names Steander and Fearn's Island begin to appear on maps around the year 1815.

By the end of the 19th century, the district had grown to become a burgeoning industrial community in the South Ward of the County Borough of Leeds, with residents of a wide variety of occupations, from servants to scholars. The area was also home to people from far outside Leeds, from places as far as the United States and Prussia. Residential housing was mainly found along the streets of Marsh Lane and East Street, as well as the now removed streets of Steander Row, Steander Bow (sometimes written as Steander Bau), and Dew Lane. The street of Steander was entirely industrial and contained little housing, if any at all. The houses in the area were slum housing of poor quality, very similar to the ones found at nearby Quarry Hill. In 1842, Crown Point Bridge was opened, connecting the Steander area to Hunslet.

The main industrial sites found within the area were iron foundries, woollen and flax mills, and most notably various lumber sawmills, of which three different sawmills were present in the area. A small power station could be found at Fearn's Island, to the west of Crown Point Bridge. Other businesses include a concrete works, a bottling plant, and an ice cream factory.

In 1896, the wider area was described by author Percy Robinson as "one of the most congested and insanitary parts of the city, crowded with squalid tenements redolent of poverty and decay".

=== Post-Industrial Decline ===
Following the decline of industry in the United Kingdom, the area followed the same trend as much of the rest of south Leeds, with the manufacturing industry sharply declining. As the industries that propped up the local area began to either close down or move out, the residents too moved out of the area or fell into poverty. Much of the area's slum housing and industrial sites were scheduled for demolition following the East Street Improvement Programme in 1905. Following the Improvement Scheme, the population never returned to the area. By 1921, the whole site of Steander Bow and Steander Row had been demolished and entirely replaced with a sawmill.

The Saxton Gardens housing estate was built over much of the north-eastern part old area in the late 1950s, replacing the old Victorian slum clearance housing with 20th century low-rise flats. In September 1958, Marsh Lane railway station was closed by British Rail, leaving the remaining industry in the area without any local rail connections. Despite this, signs of community life still clung on in the area around East Street and Marsh Lane. A public house was present on East Street and a beer house was present on nearby Cotton Street, next to the Saxton Gardens estate. A Post Office could be found on Marsh Lane, and an electrical substation existed on the site until the full demolition of the street in 2006.

In the 1970s, following industrial decline, Leeds City Council sought to rebrand Leeds as the "Motorway City of the Seventies". Part of this rebranding was the construction of the Inner Ring Road. East Street and Marsh Lane, two of the principal roads in Steander, were converted from regular city streets to a leg of the A61 road. Additionally, nearby Crown Point Road was also widened, creating a junction to feed traffic into the city centre. Due to this road widening, most of the non-listed buildings in the area were demolished to make way for the new road junction. The nearby Quarry Hill flats were also demolished in 1978, but moreso due to suffering from dangerous structural faults than road widening.

On 2 April 1970, Fredk. Dyson & Sons Ltd, the owners of Steander Foundry for since 1887, went into liquidation. The company's ironwork can still be found all over Leeds, principally in Dyson's home area of Roundhay. Much of that ironwork is engraved with "Steander Foundry, East Street Leeds." Despite decline and demolition, Fearn's Island would remain a label on road maps into the 1990s, and Steander would remain labeled as a street (incorrectly referred to on A-Z maps as Steander Lane).

As Leeds grew into a university city with a growing finance sector, there was a push to redevelop much of the old derelict factories in the area into a productive, usable urban district. In 1988, the Leeds Development Corporation was founded by the then Conservative government, responsible for redevelopment in the South Central Leeds, and would later be responsible for developments in Leeds Dock. In 1993, plans to redevelop the old derelict mills in Fearn's Island into student accommodation were proposed by Leeds-based developer Simons Estates, but were rejected by the Leeds Development Corporation, stating that the plan "does not accord with the provisions of the Development Plan in force in the area." Two more proposals at redevelopment were made in 1994 and 1997, but were both seemingly also rejected. The site was later acquired in 1999 by Conrad Ritblat following the Leeds Development Corporation's dissolution in the previous year.

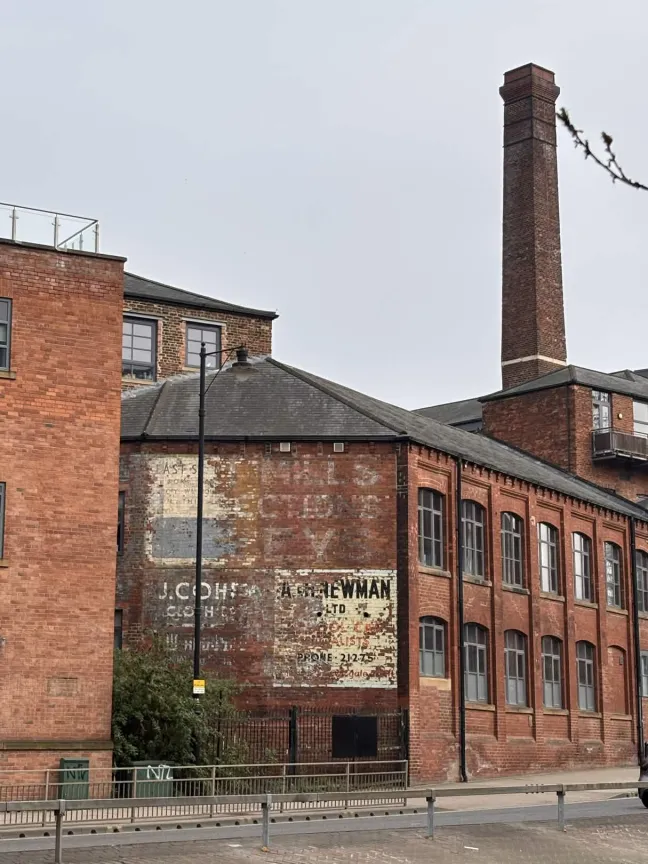
Ghost signs on East Street Mills, showing remains of old tailoring businesses in the Steander area.

=== 21st Century Regeneration ===
The final industrial site in Steander, the Howarth Timber sawmill, was demolished some time between 2003 and 2005 to make way for The Gateway, a mixed-use development with apartments, offices, and an Ibis budget hotel. Many of the old mills and factories in the Fearn's Island area are now listed buildings, and have been refurblished and redeveloped into offices and apartments. Long-abandoned brownfield land on nearby Flax Place is undergoing redevelopment by Canadian developers Starlight Investments. The development, branded as The Millworks, scheduled to be completed in early 2027.

In 2000, Fearn's Island Mills were approved for redevelopment, and restoration was completed in 2003 after being vacant since the 1960s. The restoration has since won various architectural awards in 2005 and 2006, with a stone plaque on the building recognising these achievements. Leeds Dock, directly adjacent from Fearn's Island, saw refurbishment in the 1990s, beginning with the opening of the Royal Armouries Museum in 1996 and continuing to this day, most recently with the Leeds Creative District initiative. Knight's Way Footbridge was constructed in 2007 as part of the redevelopment of the dock, connecting Fearn's Island to Leeds Dock.

In 2010, an initiative to turn an old industrial site on the northern half of Leeds Dam Island into a nature reserve began to gain traction. In 2016, the final buildings on the island, previously owned by the Sea Cadets and likely abandoned long before, were torn down. The area is now a nature reserve maintained by the Canal & River Trust. In 2026, there were plans from the Canal & River Trust to turn the northern half of the island into a community space, which have since received backlash from local councillors in the area.

Following the 2015 Boxing Day Floods, the Leeds Flood Prevention Scheme began construction as part of a two phase scheme. The first phase was completed in 2017, with the construction of a moveable weir on the site of the old Leeds Dam. The weir would go on to protect Leeds during the flooding in 2019. The second phase of the scheme, constructed further up the river, was completed in 2024.

The northern area of Steander around the former Marsh Lane station has too seen regeneration, with the former railway platform now hosting cafés and bars and the construction of the Phoenix tower and the complex around it. In February 2020, Leeds City Council told local media that the reopening of Marsh Lane station should be seriously considered, following its gentrification. The old goods yard north of the old Marsh Lane station is being developed into the Leeds Urban Village, a mixed-use development planned to house over 1,200 people.

Bridge panels from the old Timble Beck bridge remain on a traffic island between East Street and Marsh Lane. The panels were manufactures at the nearby iron foundry in the area and bear the name Steander Foundry.

== Legacy ==
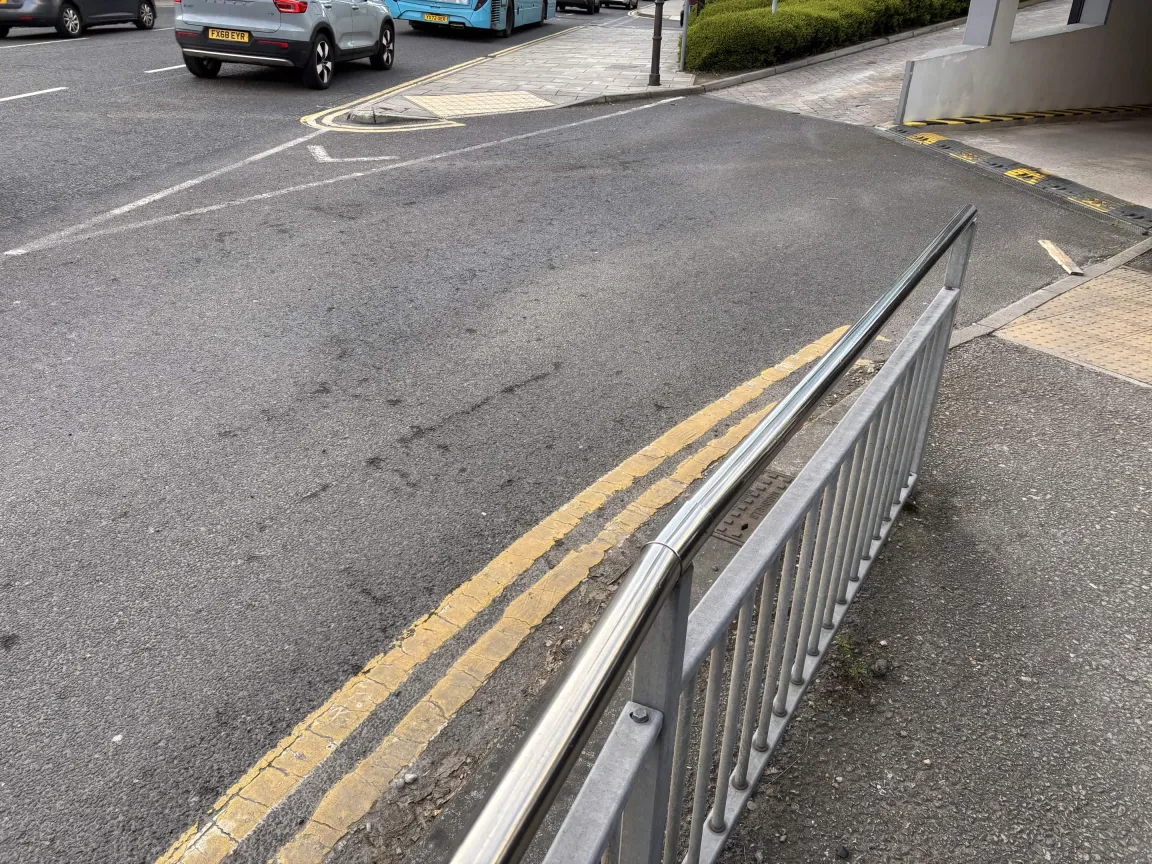
The final remains of Steander, the eponymous street that gave the area its name. Now a short access road into The Gateway.

Most of the Steander area has vanished in the modern day, with the streets bearing its name having been demolished in the 1970s. While the name Fearn's Island can be found sparingly throughout the area, Steander has all but vanished. The name cannot be found anywhere locally, with the exception of an embossed metal map at Leeds Dock showing the area as it was in the 1930s, and a panel on the Timble Beck bridge crediting the once nearby Steander Foundry.

In 1957, a short documentary named Men of Iron was filmed and directed at Steander Foundry by Jack E. Dyson, son of Frederick Dyson. The film follows the old process of making an iron piece of machinery using a handmade mould, specifically foregoing modern iron founding techniques. The film is freely accessible at both the British Film Institute and the Yorkshire Film Archive.

Leeds City Council's street register recognises the existence of Steander, Steander Row, Steander Lane, and Steander Bow, considered by the City Council to be part of the area of Hunslet. Out of the four streets, only Steander is considered to be still around, though drastically reduced in size. The street was altered from its original position and shortened further with the construction of the Gateway in 2006. An article from The London Gazette refers to the reshaped street as "Steander (part), Leeds: an irregular shaped area of highway commencing 2 metres north of its junction with East Street and having an area of approximately 56 square metres." The street now serves as the principal access road for cars to access The Gateway's ground level, as well as the entrance to underground parking.

== Amenities ==
The modern area is limited in its amenities, though is well connected to Leeds City Centre. Leeds Bus Station is 300 metres north-west, and the train station is a kilometre directly west. The Royal Armouries Museum is directly south, and is accessible via a footbridge from Fearn's Island. Recent nearby developments have also opened up new nearby amenities, such as the recently redeveloped Aire Park in Hunslet, and the burgeoning businesses under the old Marsh Lane railway station platform. Leeds Central Ambulance Station is located within the old Steander area next to the Saxton Gardens estate. St. Saviour Church and Leeds Minster are the closest religious buildings, in nearby Richmond Hill and The Calls respectively.

The nearest eating establishments are The Palace pub in The Calls, and a Mumtaz restaurant at Leeds Dock. Fearns restaurant at Leeds Dock is named after Fearn's Island.

== Gallery ==
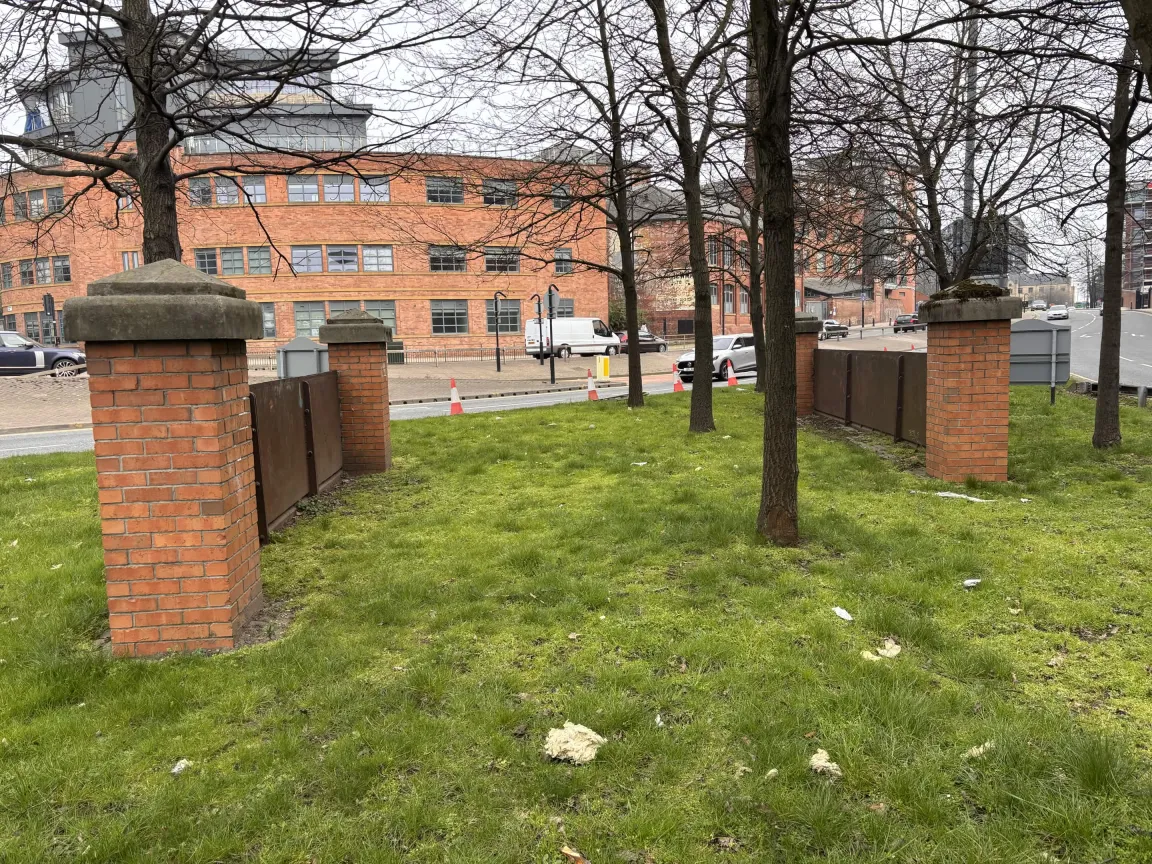
The bridge panels of Timble Bridge.

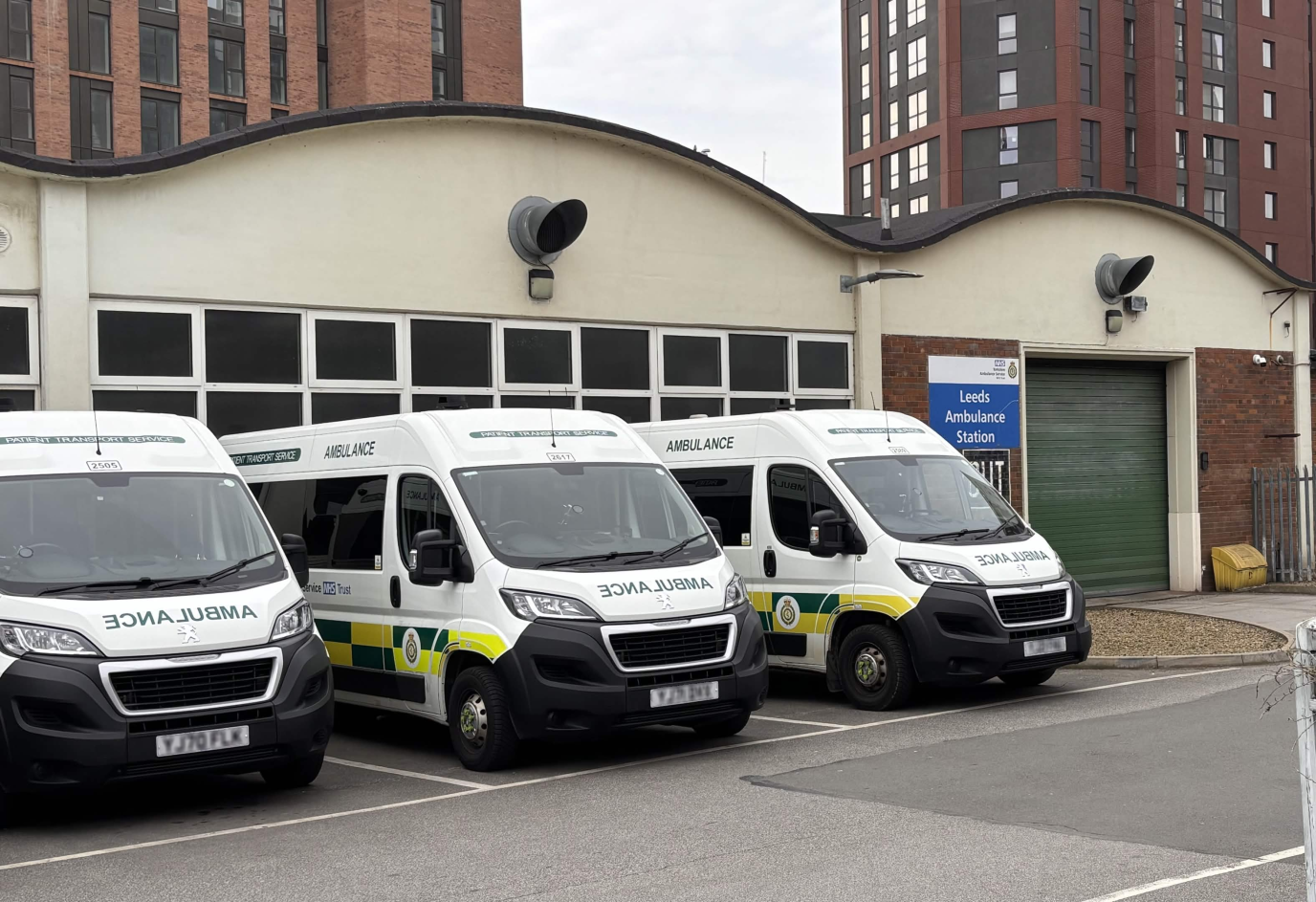
Leeds Central Ambulance Station, located next to Saxton Gardens.

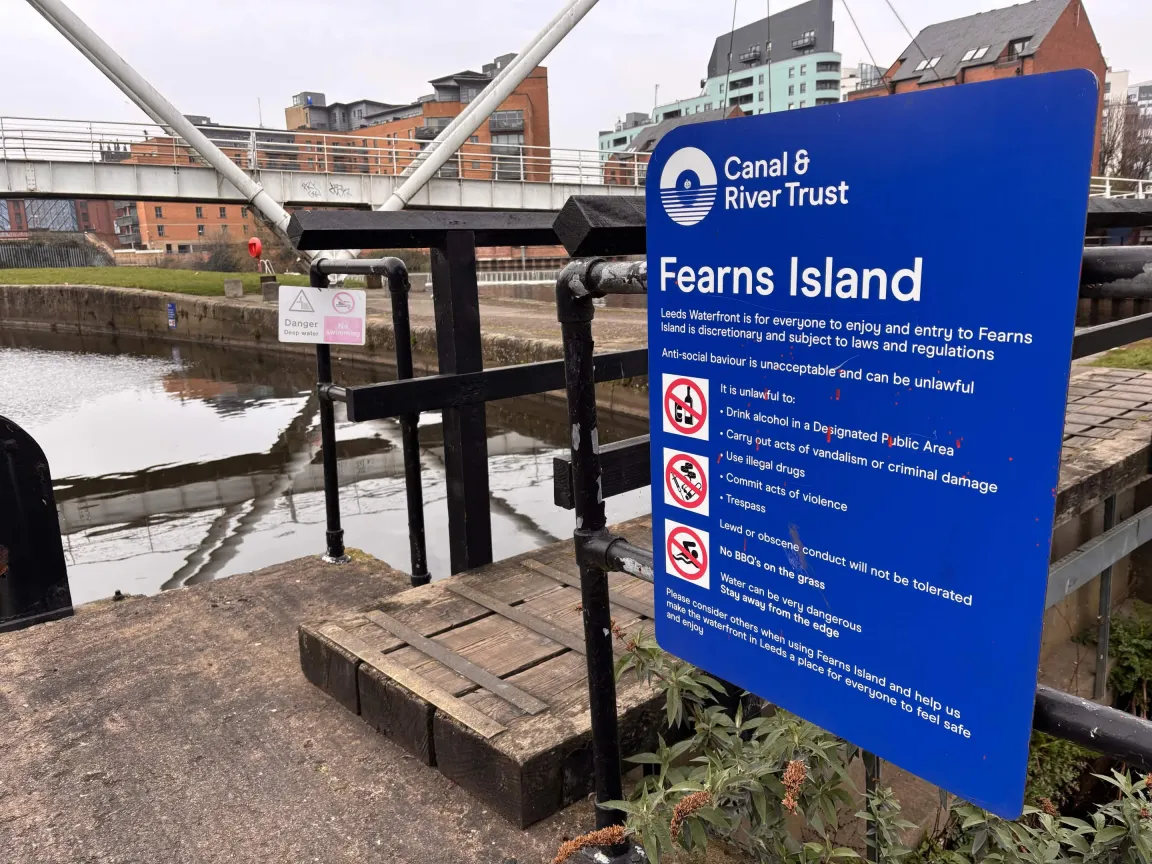
Sign at Leeds Dock, referring to the lock island as Fearns Island.

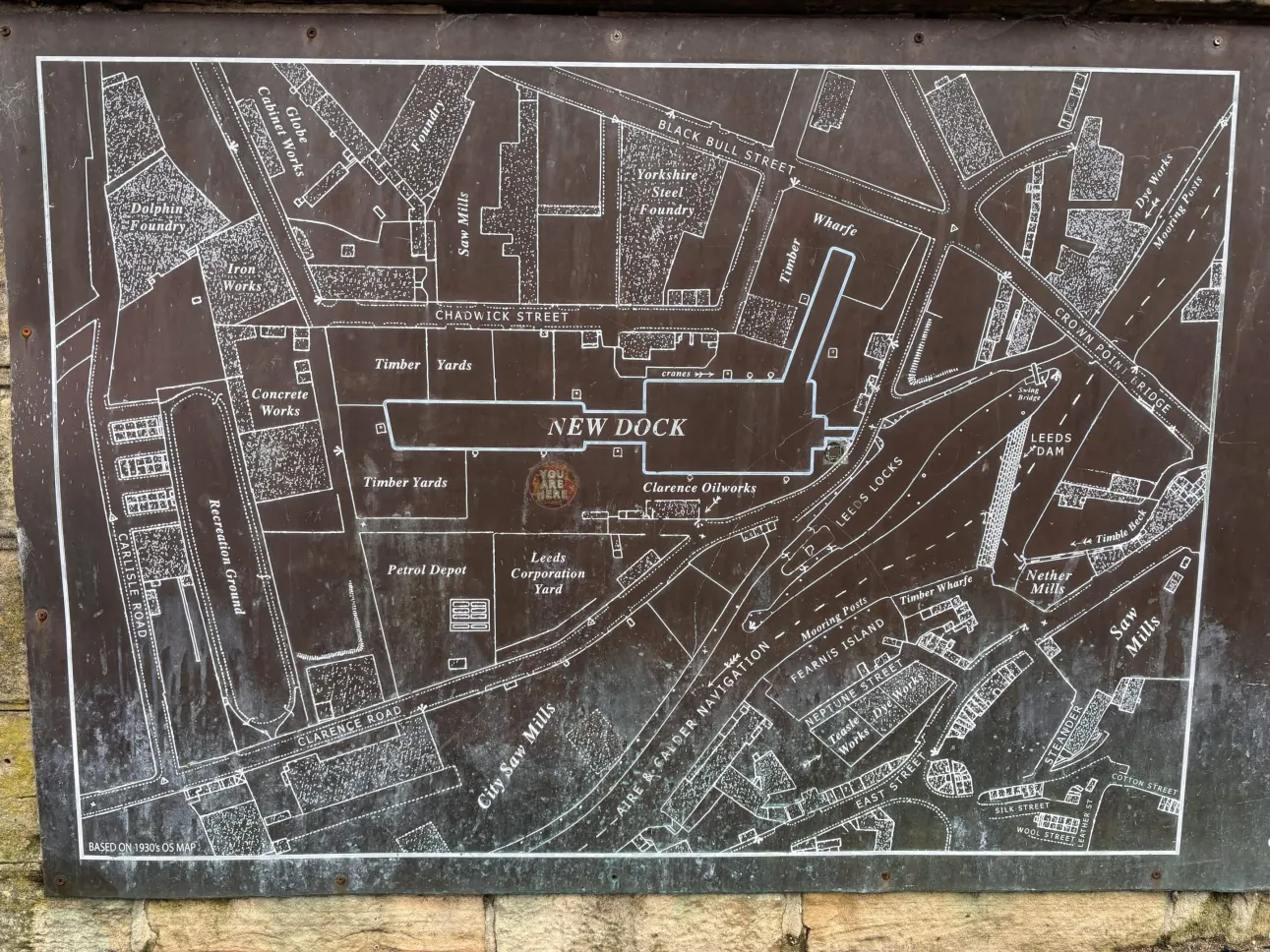
Metal map at Leeds Dock, showing the location of Steander in the 1930s.

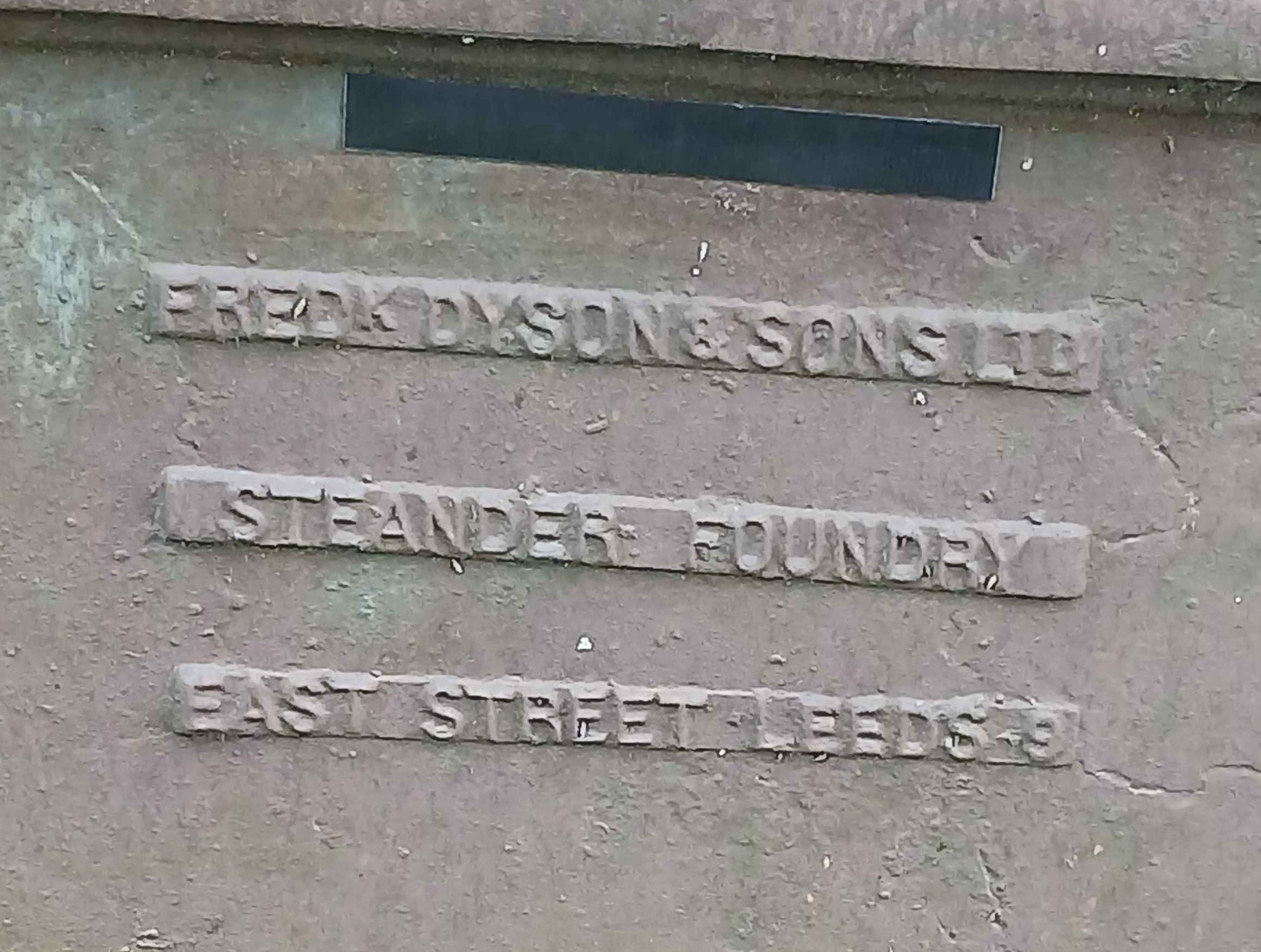
Steander Foundry engraving on Timble Bridge, cast at the foundry by Fred Dyson & Sons Ltd.

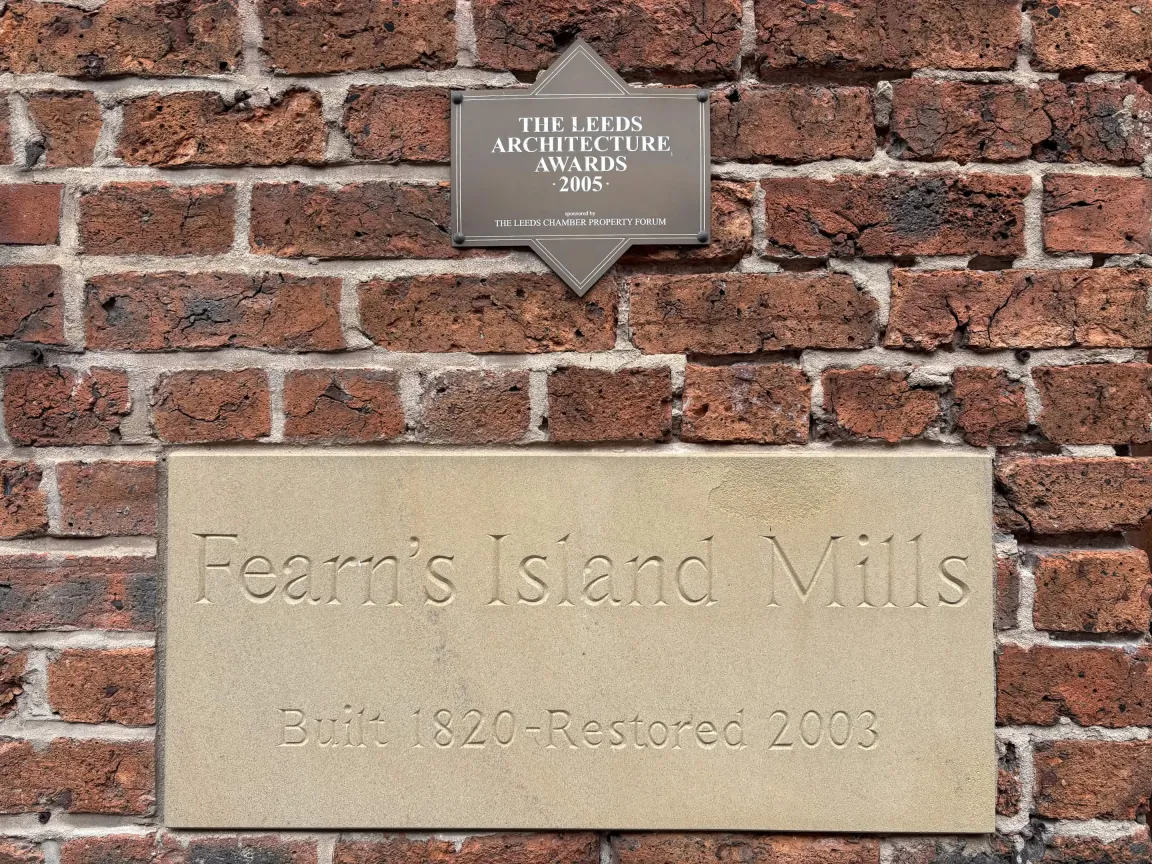
Fearn's Island Mills plaque, commemorating its restoration in 2003.

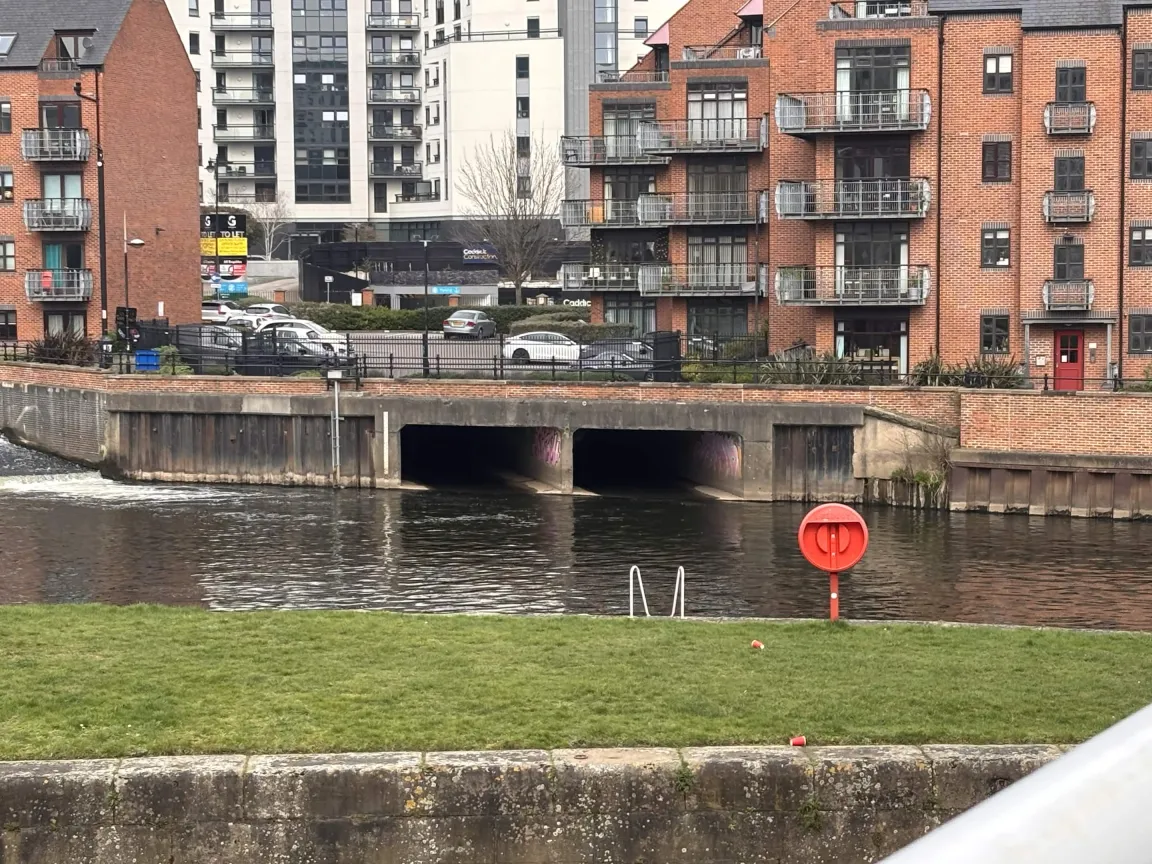
The outflow where Timble Beck meets the River Aire.

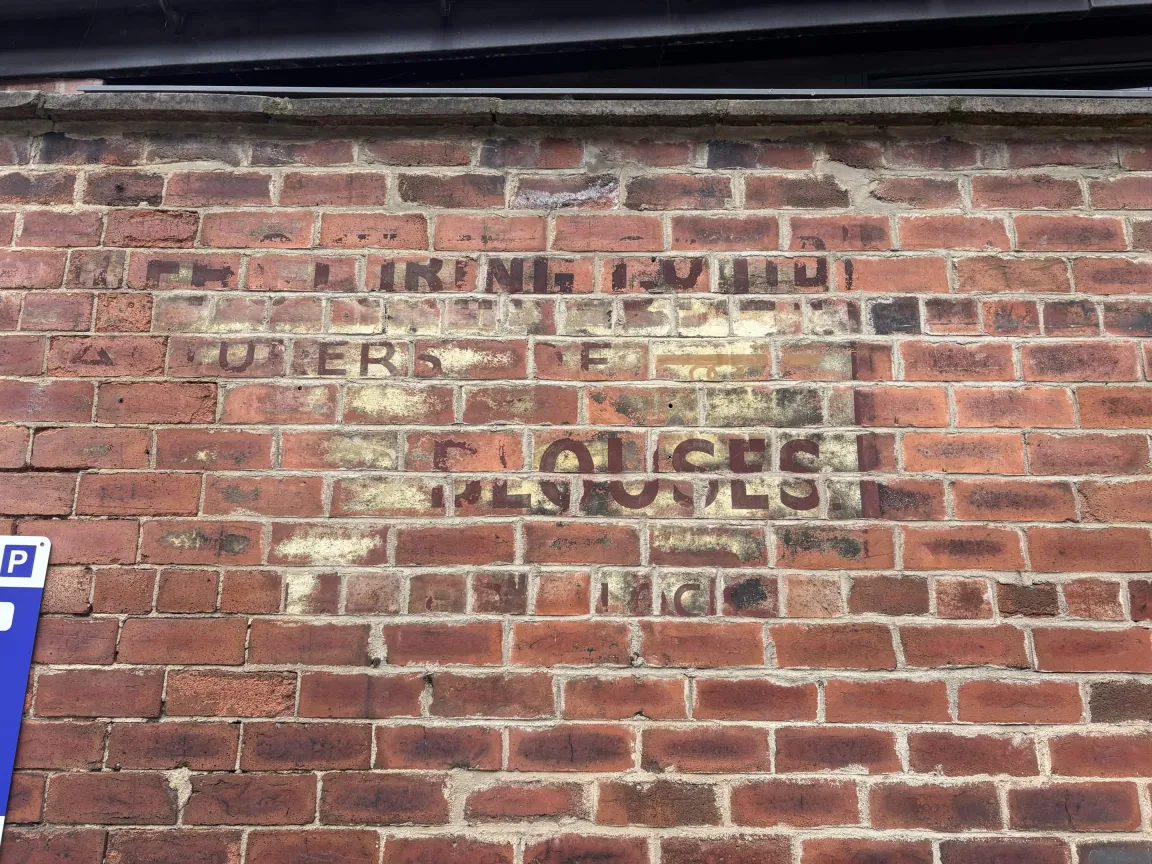
A lone ghost sign at East Street Mills, advertising tailoring of blouses.

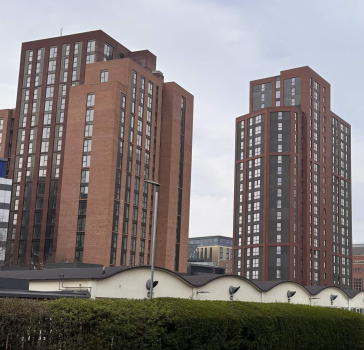
Phoenix and Altitude towers, near the old Marsh Lane railway station.
