= Leeds Dock =

Mixed development in Leeds, England

Coordinates: 53.7918°N 1.5335°W

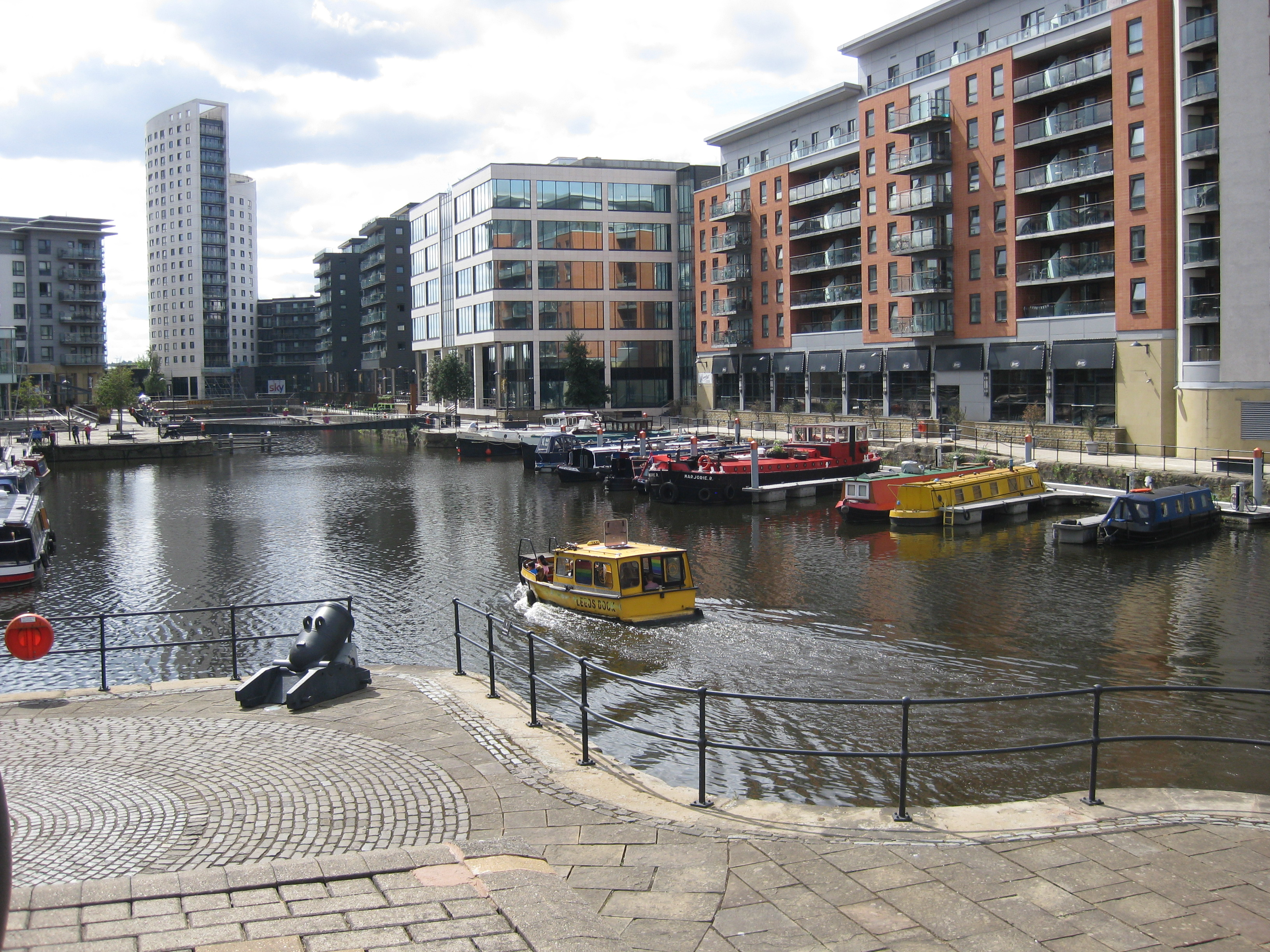
A water taxi in Leeds Dock

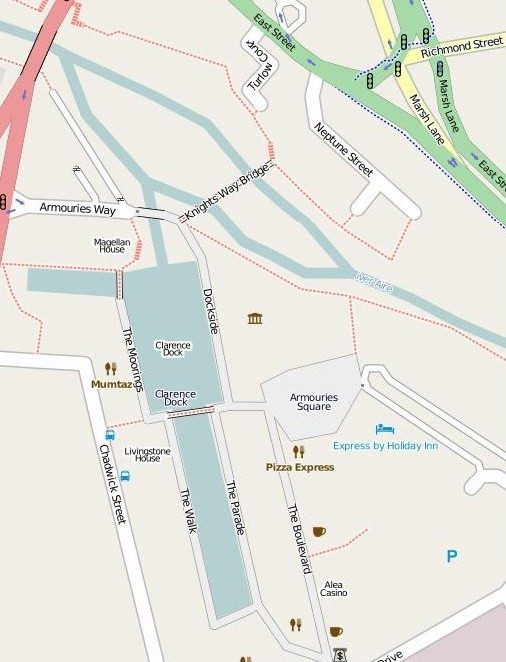
Map of Leeds Dock

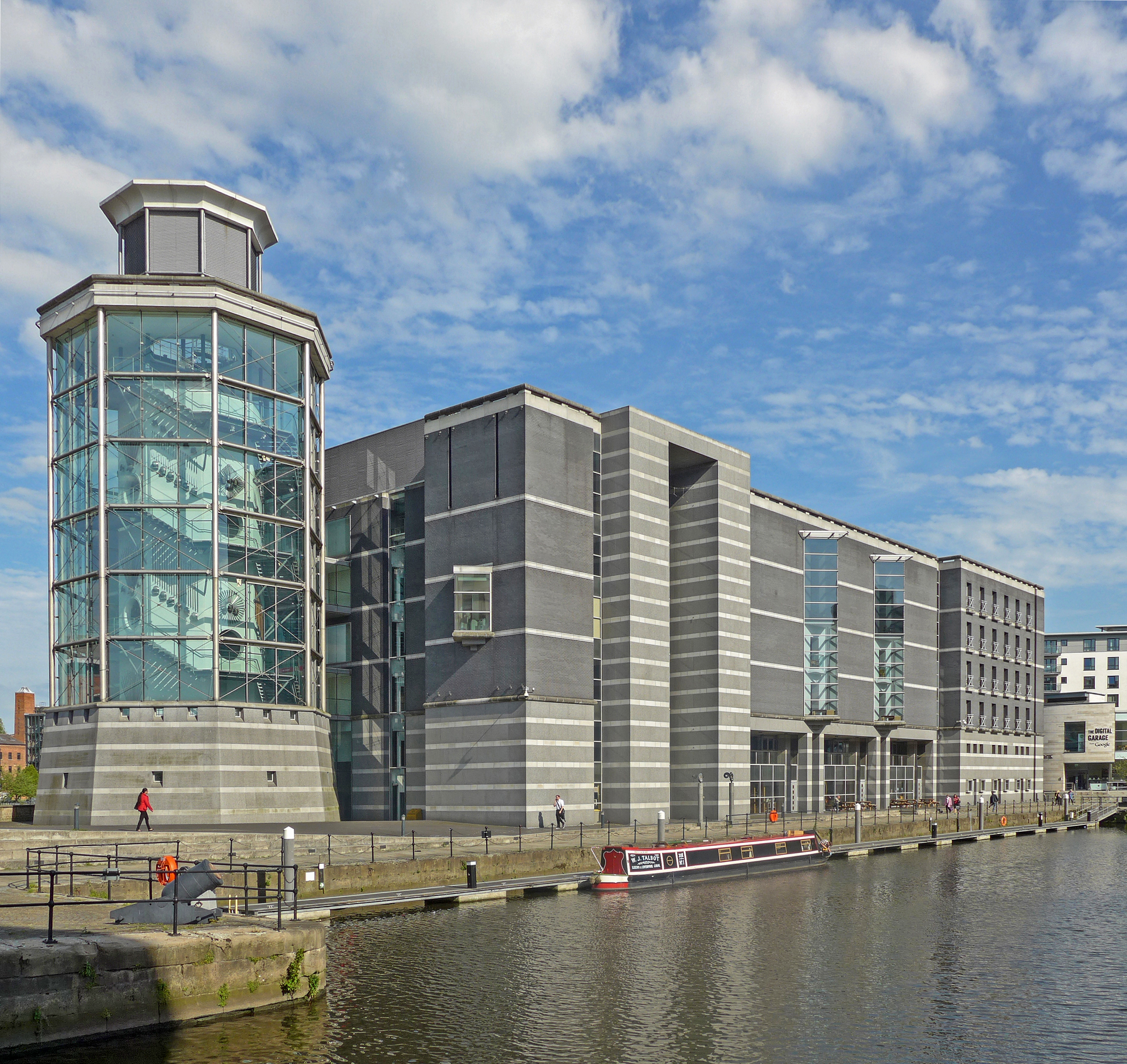
Royal Armouries Museum

Leeds Dock (formerly New Dock and previously Clarence Dock) is a mixed development with retail, office and leisure presence by the River Aire in central Leeds, West Yorkshire, England. It has a large residential population in waterside apartments. The dock is adjacent to Fearns Island, a small river island housing both Leeds Lock and Leeds Dam, part of the Leeds Flood Alleviation Scheme, as well as a nature reserve.

== History ==
The dock was constructed for boats using the Leeds and Liverpool Canal and the Aire and Calder Navigation to tranship goods and commodities from Leeds city centre in 1843. It was primarily used to bring coal from collieries around Rothwell and Wakefield to supply heavy industries in Hunslet and business and commerce in Leeds city centre.

The western side of the dock once had a large crane on tracks along the side of the dock to load and unload goods from canal barges. In the 1990s the surrounding area was made up of Victorian industrial buildings most of which were derelict. Throughout the second half of the 20th century the area suffered steady industrial decline. The mills and many heavy engineering works began to close, move further out of town or scale down.

Construction of the £42.5 million purpose-built Royal Armouries Museum marked the start of the area's redevelopment which opened in March 1996. No further development was made until 2004 when a multi-storey car park opened followed by an Express hotel in August 2006. The retail and leisure sector was launched on 11 October 2008 with fashion shows from celebrity fashion consultant and TV presenter Gok Wan. However few retail chains were attracted to the area and the site failed to take off as a shopping centre.

The site, which had been known as Clarence Dock, became New Dock in mid-2012 as part of a re-branding initiative. The site was bought by Allied London, and rebranded as Leeds Dock in 2013.

== Facilities ==
Leeds Dock is the home of the Royal Armouries Museum, a major national museum. In 2024-5 the museum attracted around 350,000 visitors per year. Although the site was originally intended to include a destination shopping centre, few shops opened and most of the shops that did open have since closed: in 2025 it was described as 'almost empty' and 'poorly connected'. However, in May 2025 the Royal Armouries purchased the freehold of its site in support of its plans to develop its conferencing and events facilities. This represents one of the Leeds Transformational Regeneration Partnership's three key placemaking initiatives for regenerating the South Bank of the River Aire, alongside British Library North and Aire Park.

Leeds Dock's main shopping street, 'The Boulevard' radiates southbound from Armouries Square. Another focal point is 'The Anchorage' at the top of the dock. Clarence House is a 218-foot (66 m) tower containing 227 apartments and six retail units.

== Gallery ==
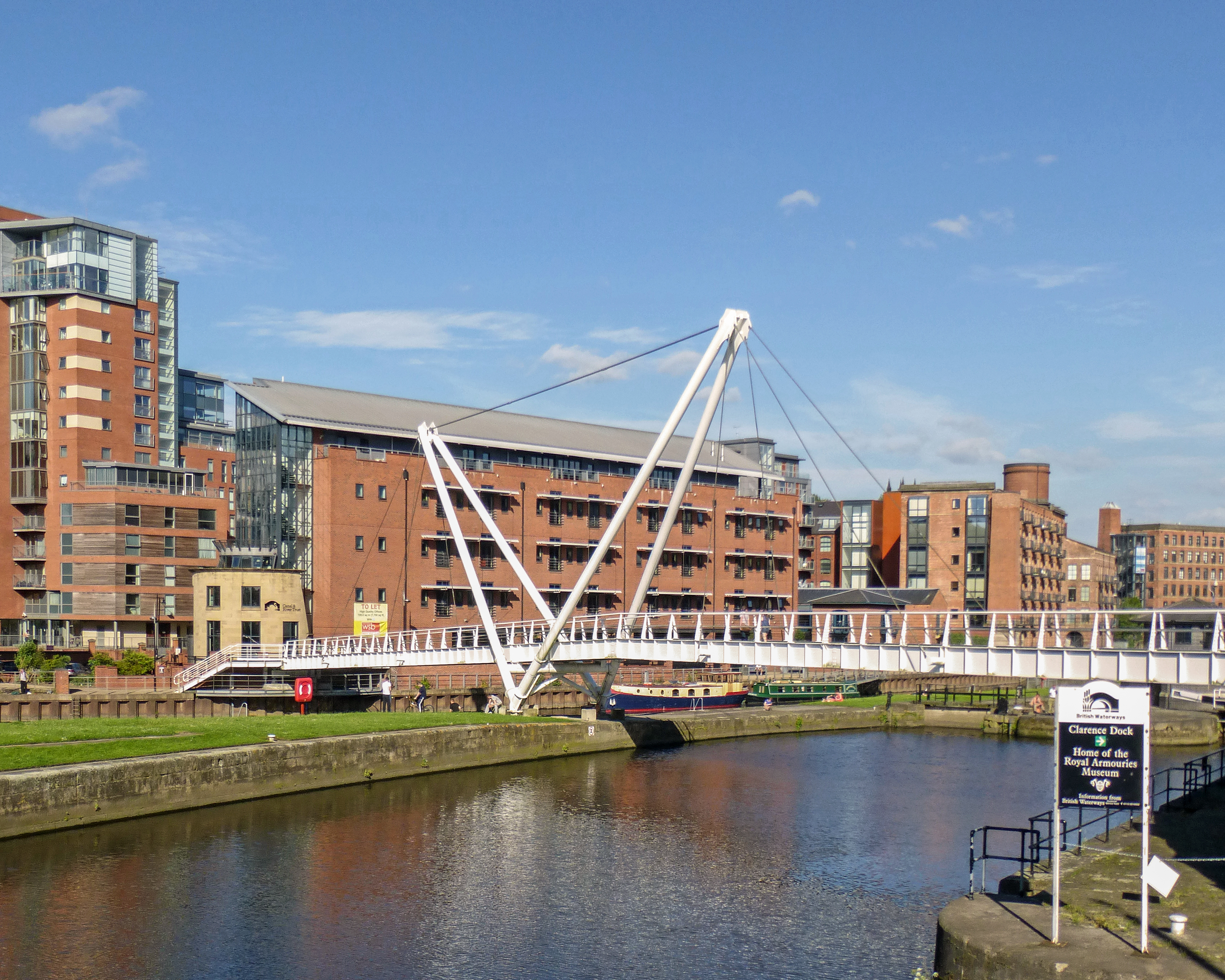
Knights Way Bridge at Leeds Dock over The River Aire, linking Leeds Dock with the East Bank, designed by Buro Happold

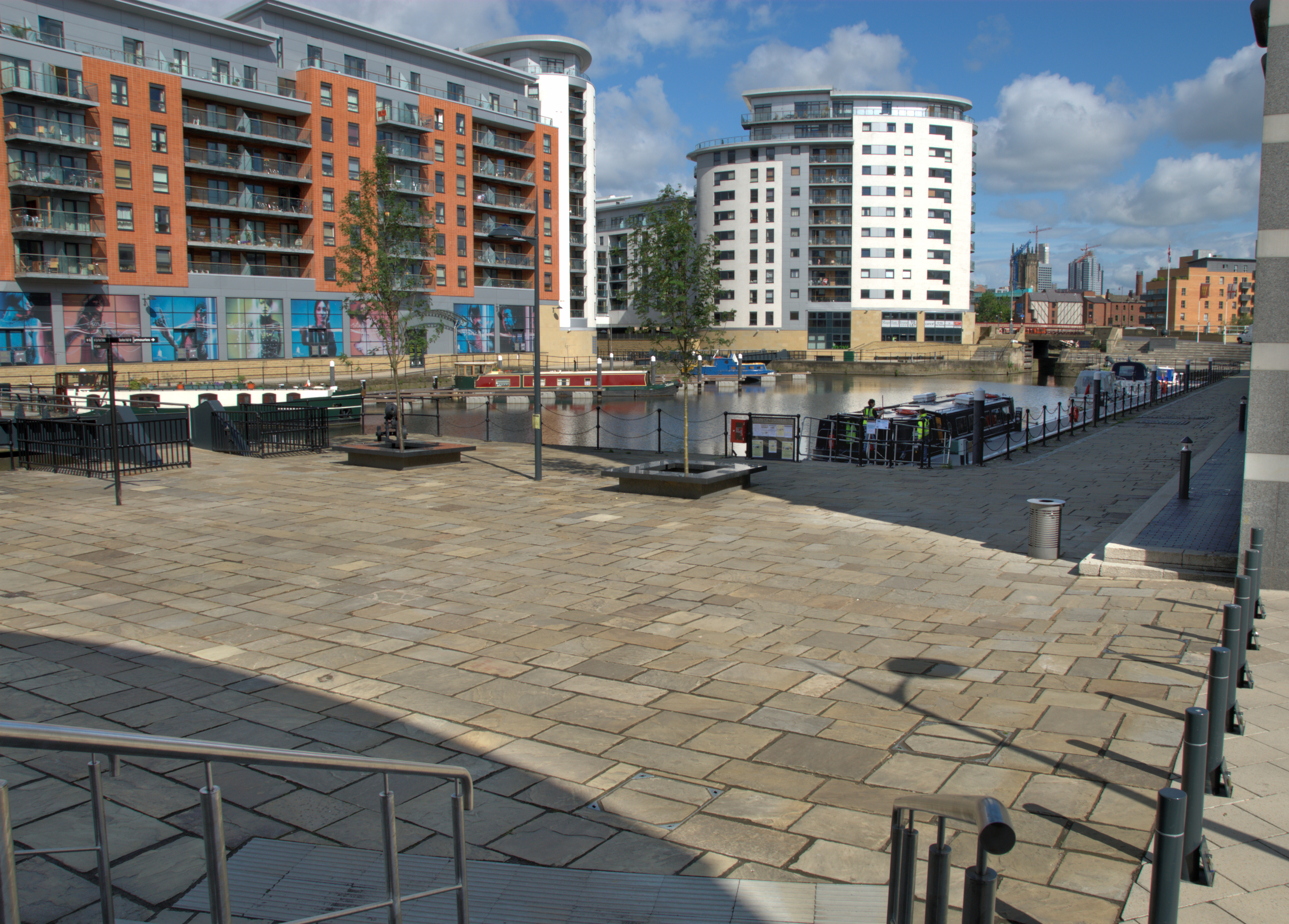
Leeds Dock

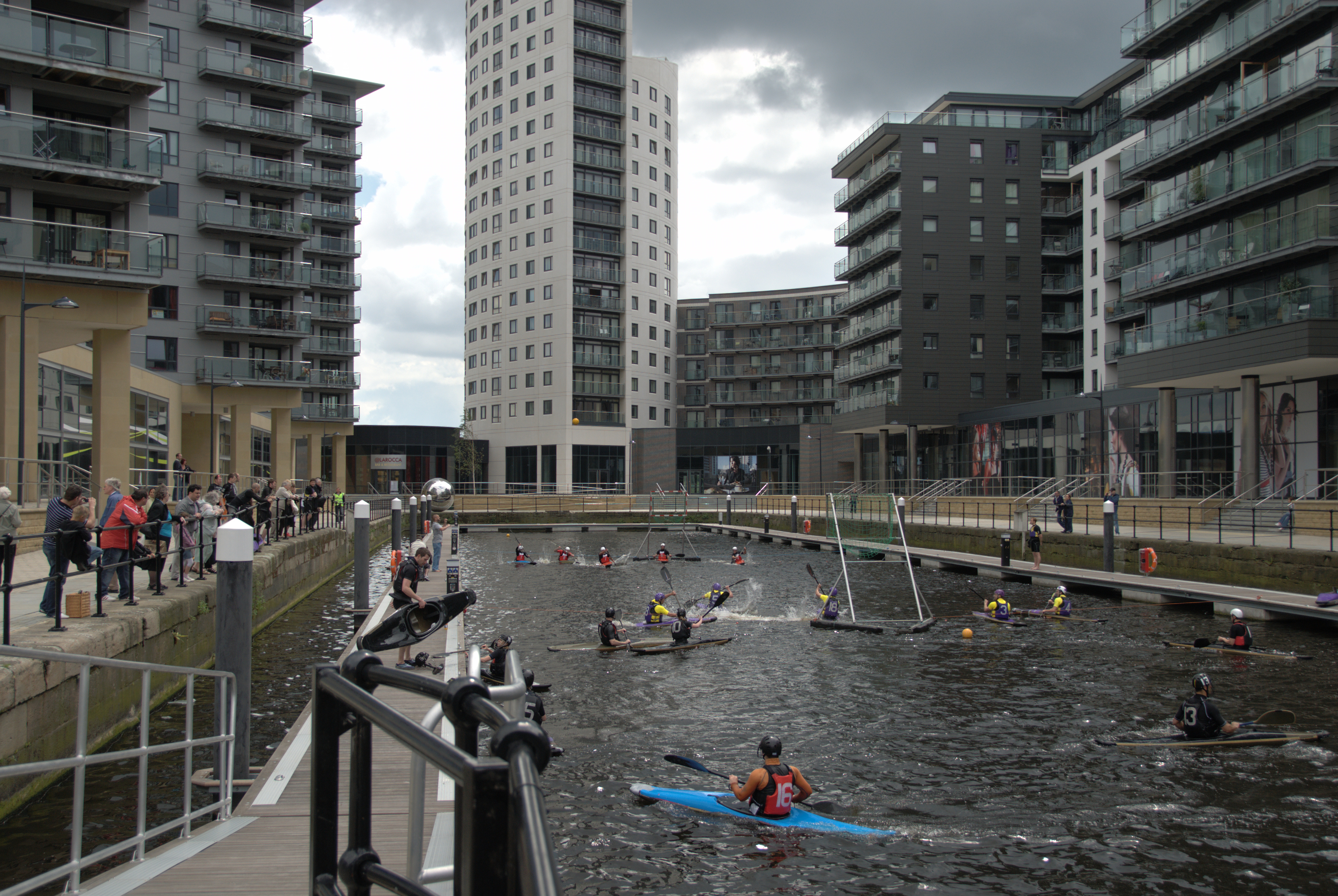
Waterfront Festival Day at Leeds Dock

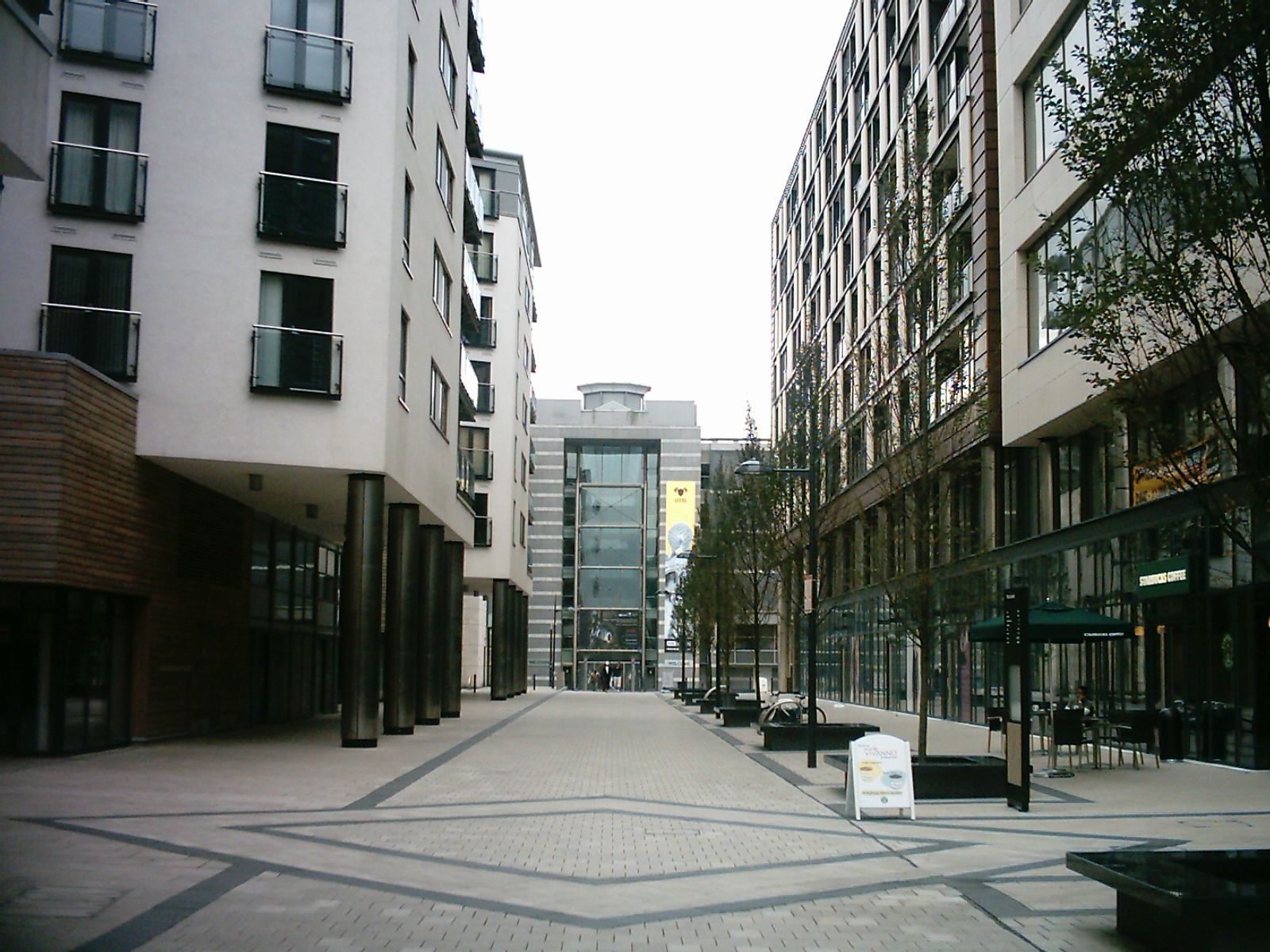
The Boulevard at Leeds Dock, looking towards the Royal Armouries Museum

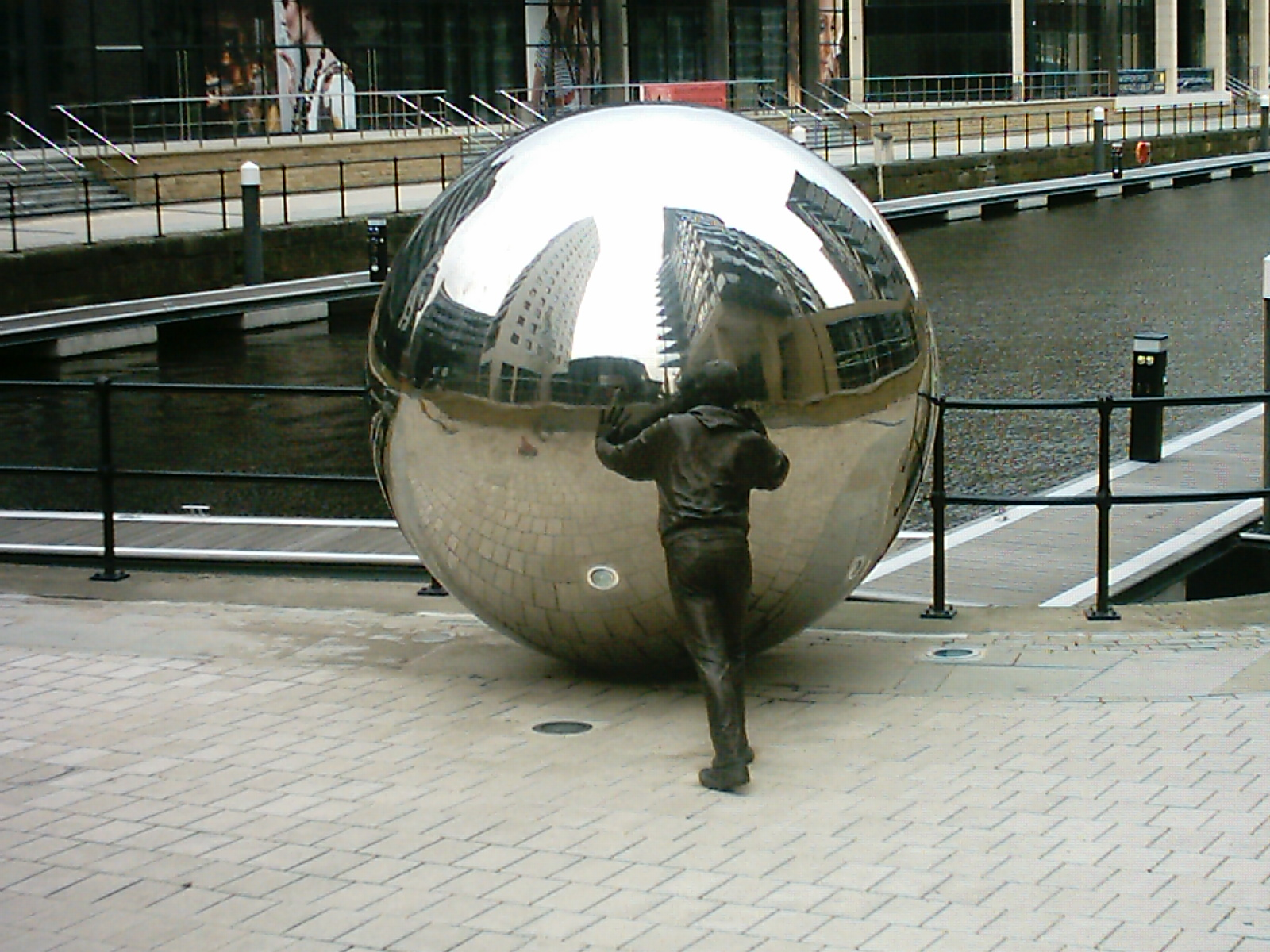
Public art on display at Leeds Dock

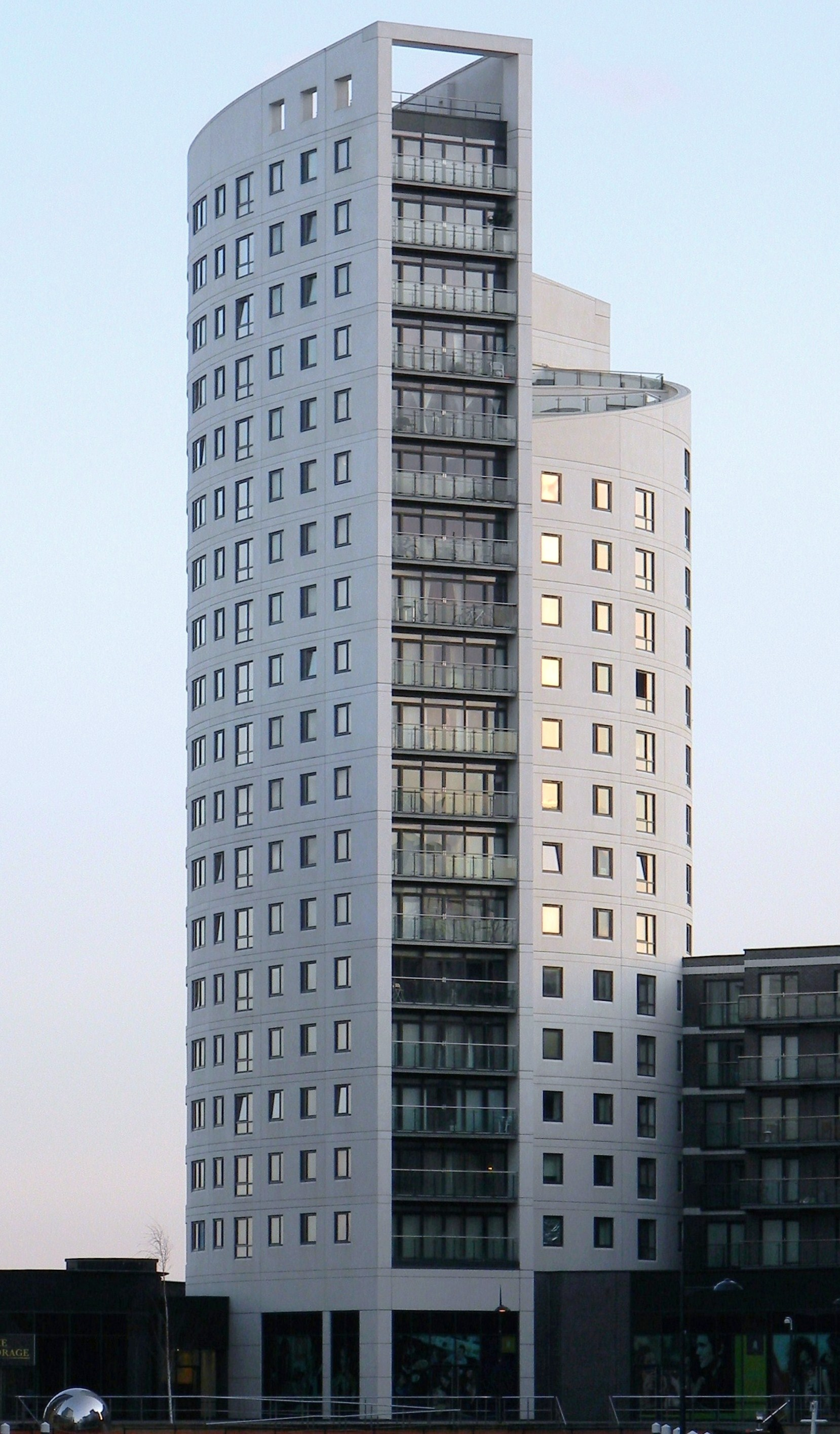
Clarence House

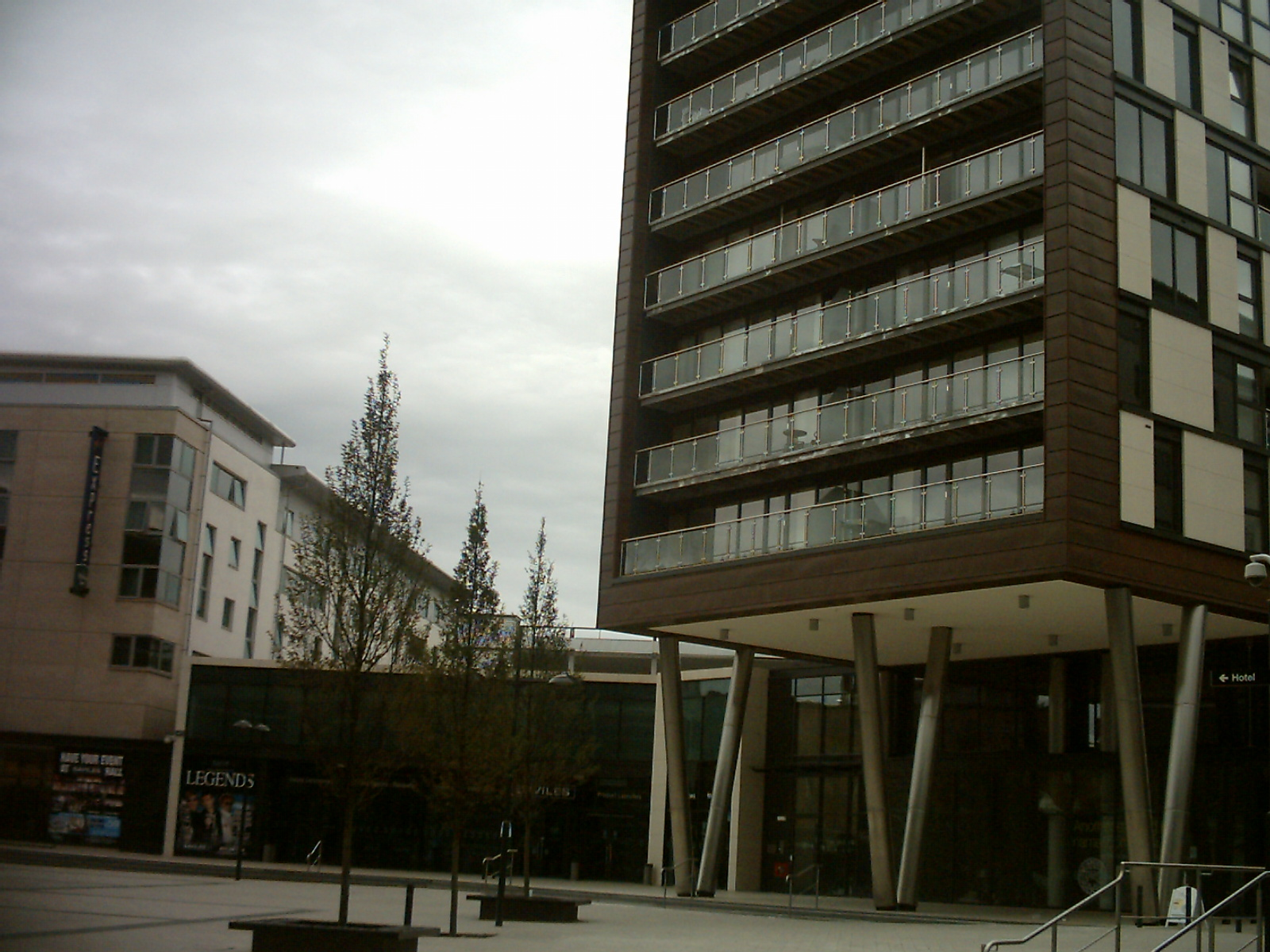
Armouries Square

== See also ==
- List of tallest buildings in Leeds
- Architecture of Leeds
