= British Library North =

Proposed library in Leeds, England

British Library North is a planned branch of the British Library. It will be based in Temple Works in the Holbeck area of Leeds. Its proposed use will link with the British Library's existing site in Boston Spa, to the north-east of Leeds.

In late 2024 it was feared that the funding for the library would not be provided after HM Treasury said that they were "minded to withdraw funding" to save money. £10 million of funding had initially been granted for the library project as part of the £100 million culture regeneration budget of from the levelling-up policy of the Conservative government. In February 2025 it was announced that the project would receive £10 million.

The Temple Works building will be bought into public ownership as part of the project.

The project is expected to lead to regeneration of housing and commercial properties on sites surrounding the Temple Works.
