= Fearns Island =

River island in Leeds, England

Coordinates: 53.792833°N 1.533027°W

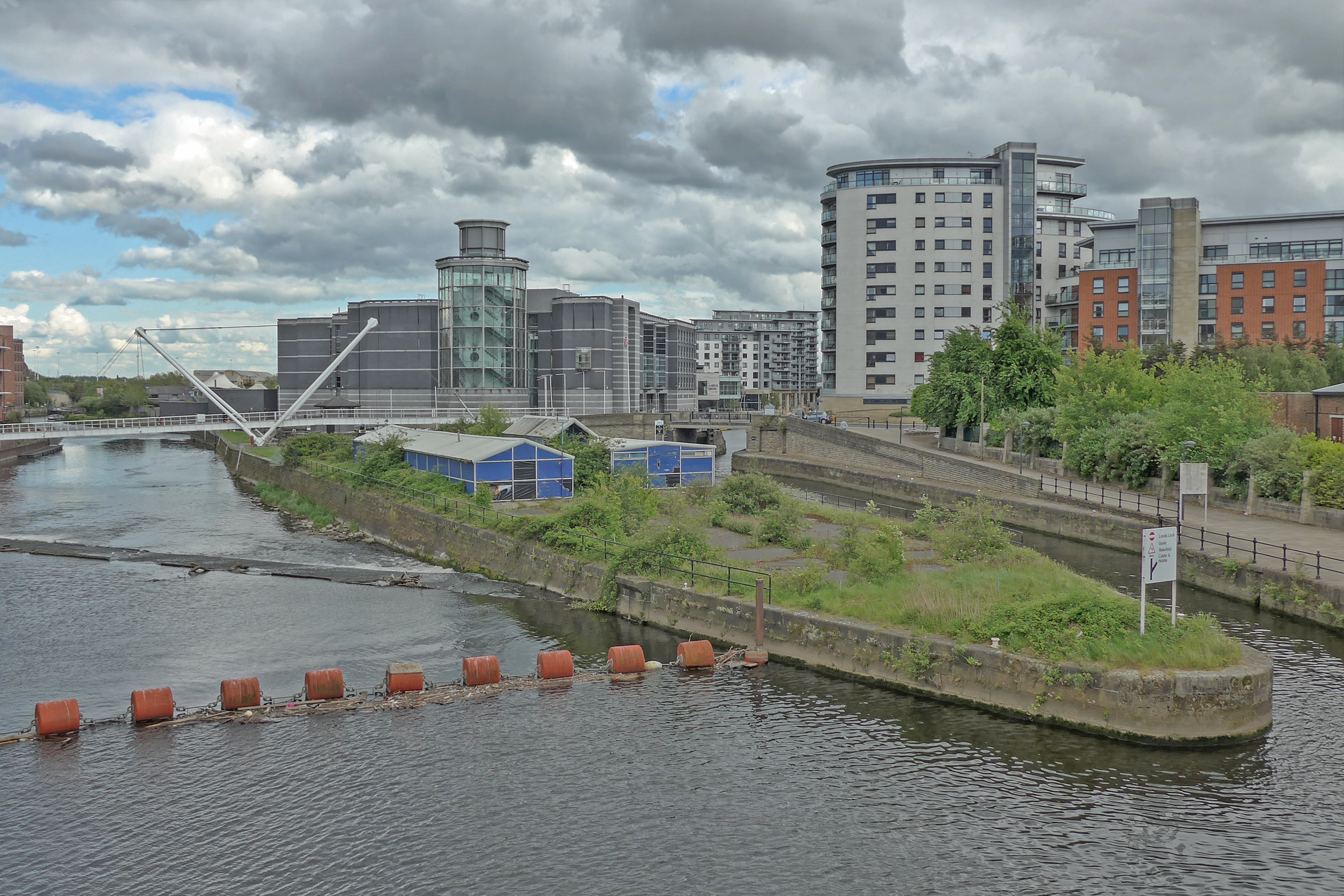
- Fearns Island in 2015, shortly before the buildings were demolished.
- Interactive map of Fearns Island

Geography
- Location: River Aire
- Area: 0.7 acres (0.28 ha)
- Length: 237 m (777.6 ft)
- Width: 24 m (78.7 ft)

Administration
- England
- Metropolitan County: West Yorkshire
- Metropolitan Borough: City of Leeds

Additional information
- Post code: LS10

Fearns Island (sometimes referred to metonymically as Leeds Lock and historically as Leeds Dam Island) is a small river island lying in the middle of the River Aire, between the banks of Leeds Dock and Leeds city centre. The island covers roughly 0.7 acres of land. The island acts as a break in the river, dividing the weir at Leeds Dam from Leeds Lock, a terminal lock in the Aire and Calder Navigation. Nowadays, the island and the lock are managed by the Canal & River Trust. The island falls at the centre point of Knight's Way Footbridge, built in 2007 to connect Leeds Dock with the apartments on the other side of the river. Leeds Dam was refurbished in 2017 as part of the Leeds Flood Alleviation Scheme. The island falls within the council ward of Hunslet and Riverside and the parliamentary constituency of Leeds South.

The northern half of the island was once home to various industrial sites, but eventually fell into disrepair in the 20th century. A proposal was put forward in 2010 to turn the northern half of the island into a nature reserve. The plan went ahead, and buildings on the island were eventually demolished in 2016 and the area was given over to wildlife. As of July 2026, the nature reserve is currently undergoing renovations, including the construction of a pathway. The island also hosts mooring posts for barges and other small boats along the river.

== Naming ==
The island takes its name from an old district of Leeds, Fearn's Island, named after the Fearn family that owned the mills in the area around Leeds Dam. Unlike the old area, the name is typically spelt without the apostrophe. Historically the island is also referred to as Leeds Dam Island, as it acts as the western edge of Leeds Dam.

Sometimes, the island is referred to metonymically as Leeds Lock, the primary landmark and feature of the island.

The island is sometimes split on maps into North Fearn's Island and South Fearn's Island, with the North being the formerly built up part of the island, and the south being the area around the lock. On many old maps, the island is simply left unlabeled, or labeled generically as Wharf.

Very few newspaper sources from before the year 2000 refer to the island as Fearns Island, or typically by any name at all, so it's likely that the name was popularised by the Sea Cadets who were present on the island from the 1950s into the early 2000s.

== Features and Amenities ==
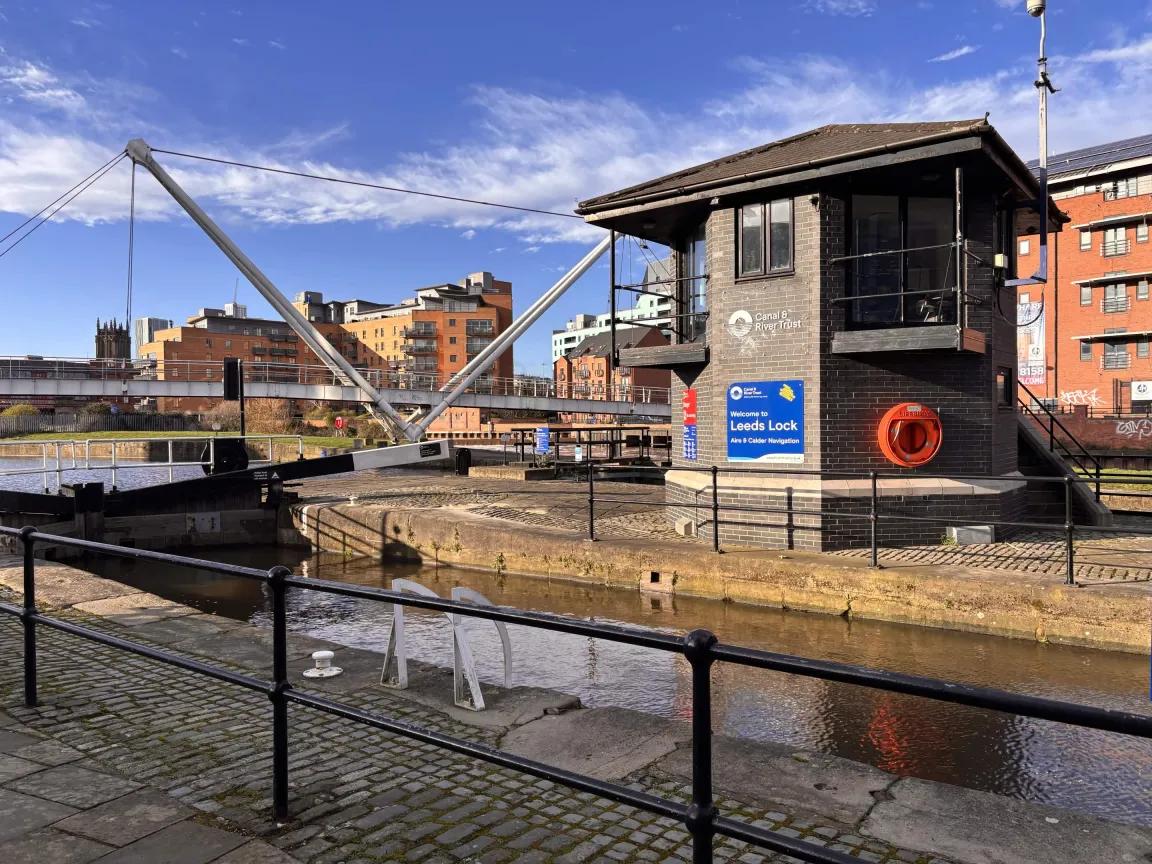
Leeds Lock, with Knight's Way Footbridge in the background.

=== Leeds Lock ===
Leeds Lock is the primary feature of the island and the reason for its creation. The lock was built some time in the 1700s to allow the Aire and Calder Navigation to be navigable up to Leeds Bridge. The lock sees roughly 1,000 to 1,500 boat passages per year. Since the removal of the swing bridge in the mid-2000s, the lock is currently the only way to access the island as a pedestrian.

=== Knight's Way Footbridge ===
The Knight's Way Footbridge is a bridge that goes over the island, connecting Leeds Dock with the north bank of the river, historically referred to as Fearn's Island. It was built in 2007 as part of the redevelopment of the area following the construction of the Royal Armouries Museum in 1997. The bridge is not accessible from the island.

=== Nature Reserve ===
The Fearns Island Nature Reserve takes up most of the north-western end of the island. Historically, the area had been home to various buildings such as stone saw mill in the 1800s, and the headquarters of the City of Leeds Sea Cadets from the 1960s until 2006. In 2016, the last buildings on the site were demolished and the area was converted into a small nature reserve. The nature reserve has since seen wildlife move in, including grey herons and 40,000 bees of three different species. Since March 2026, the Nature Reserve has been undergoing refurbishment.

=== Leeds Dam ===
Leeds Dam, also known as Leeds Weir and historically Nether Mills Weir, is a weir that runs from the northern half of the island to the north bank of the river, historically referred to as Fearn's Island. It is the oldest feature on the site, having been around since at least 1636. The weir was built to provide power to the Nether Mills situated on the north bank. Through, following the demolition of Nether Mills in the mid-20th century, the weir remained unused until it was demolished and rebuilt in 2017 as a movable weir, as part of the Leeds Flood Prevention Scheme, utilising pressurised air bladders to mitigate flooding in the City Centre.

== History ==
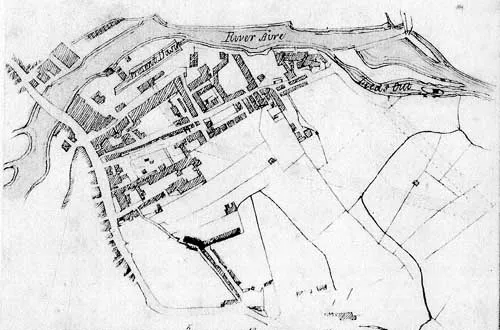
A map of the south bank of Leeds drawn in 1828. The island is visible in the top right with the label "Leeds Cut". Leeds Dock has yet to be constructed.

=== Leeds Dam and the Aire & Calder Navigation ===
While a dam in the area was likely first built during the Middle Ages, the earliest record of industrial activity in the area is from 1636. In 1699, plans to widen and make the section of the River Aire from Leeds was given royal assent, culminating in the Aire and Calder Navigation, allowing goods from Leeds to be exported to the wider world via the Ouse and Humber rivers which flow out into the North Sea via Hull.

Navigation up to Leeds Bridge and further up to the Leeds and Liverpool Canal was obstructed by the dam, which was an obstacle to boats travelling upstream. To mitigate this, a small channel was dug bypassing the dam and creating a river island, referred to as the New Cut or Leeds Cut. Two locks were built on the site to account for the elevation of the river. Nowadays, only one of them is usable.

=== Industrial Revolution and Decline ===
Across the river, the Nether Mills, previously owned by the Dunwell family, were acquired through marriage by Josiah Fearn, a wealthy salter and Lord of the Manor of Leeds. Though Fearn would be tried for murder and hung in 1749, his descendants would maintain control of the mills. This would lead to the area becoming known as Fearn's Island. Whether any of the Fearns had any control over the modern Fearns Island is unknown.

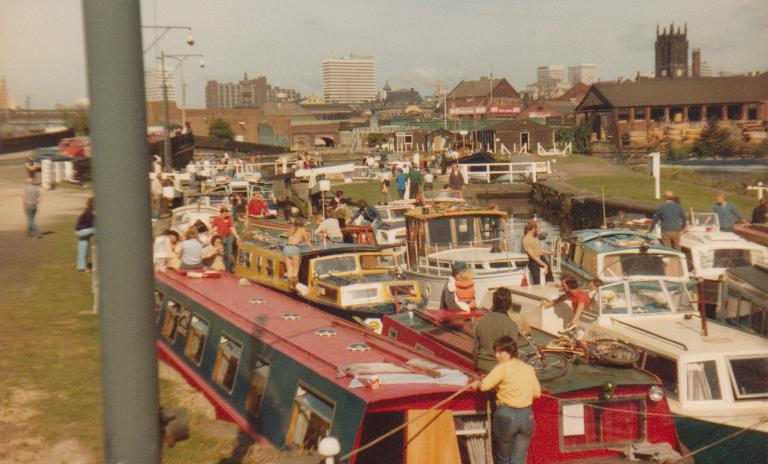
Fearns Island in 1981 during a boat rally held by the Inland Waterways Association. Leeds Minster and West Riding House are visible in the background.

In the Industrial Revolution, the northern half of the island, the half large enough to house buildings, would become home to multiple manufacturing plants. A small stone saw mill was present on the site during the 1880s.

Leeds Dock was built on the adjacent bank in 1843, constructed for boats using the Leeds and Liverpool Canal and the Aire and Calder Navigation to transport goods and commodities from Leeds city centre out into the North Sea via the River Ouse.

The island would eventually fall into disrepair in the 20th century. The industrial sites on the island were eventually vacated. The Sea Cadets would occupy the northern half of the island throughout the back half of the 20th century. Ownership of the buildings in the area is occasionally falsely attributed to the similarly named Sea Scouts.

At this time, control of Leeds Lock would be nationalised and put under the authority of British Waterways.

=== 21st Century Regeneration ===
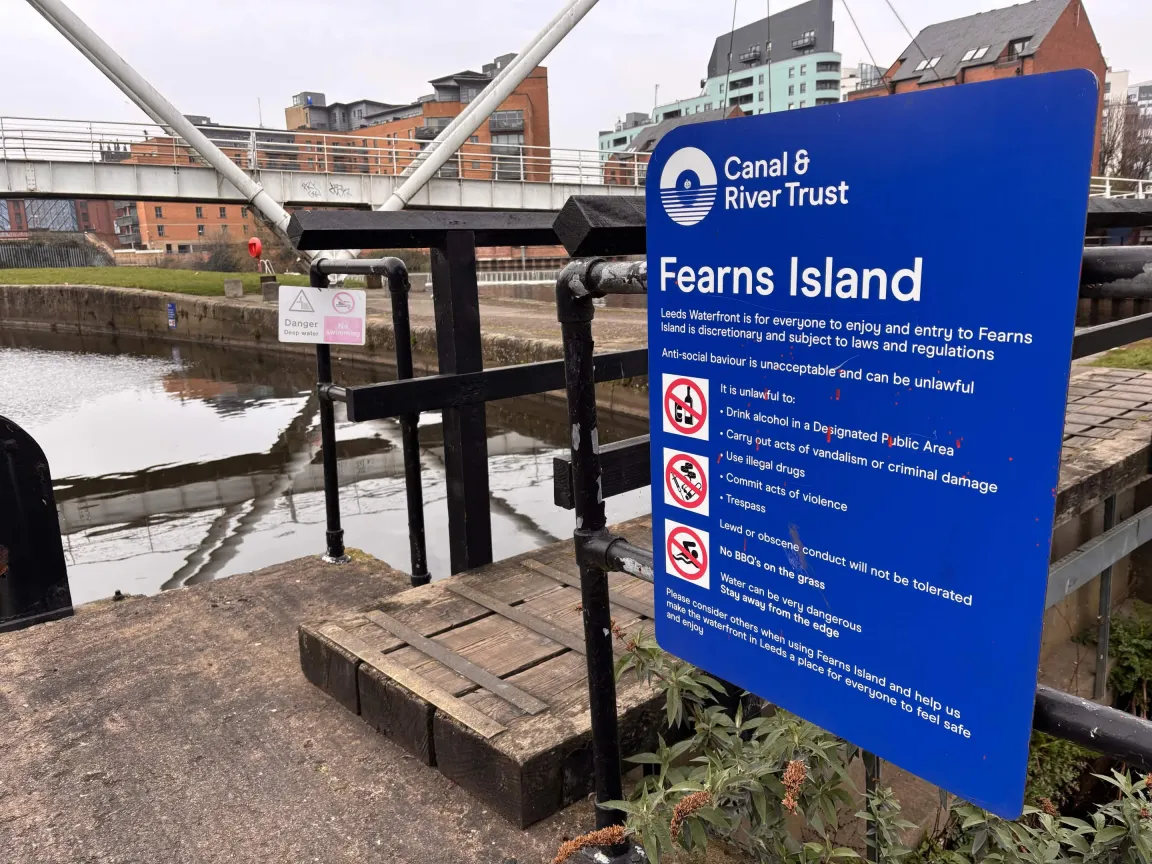
A notice sign referred to the island as Fearns Island, put up by the Canal & River Trust.

Leeds Dock, which too had fallen into disrepair, was put under the jurisdiction of the Leeds Development Corporation in the late 1980s. The area would be developed throughout the following decade, particularly following with the opening of the Royal Armouries Museum in 1996. A bridge over the island, Knight's Way Footbridge, was constructed in 2007 to connect the redevelopments at Leeds Dock with the apartments built on the other side of the river. In 2006, the Sea Cadets vacated the site, moving further down the river to Thwaite Mills. The swing bridge on the northern end of the island was taken down around the same time, likely removed when the Sea Cadets moved out.

The Canal & River Trust took control of Leeds Lock upon their founding in July 2012. It is still maintained by them to this day.

Following the 2015 Boxing Day Floods, the Leeds Flood Prevention Scheme began construction as part of a two phase scheme. The first phase was completed in 2017, with the construction of a moveable weir on the site of the old Leeds Dam. The weir would go on to protect Leeds during the flooding in 2019. The second phase of the scheme, constructed further up the river, was completed in 2024.

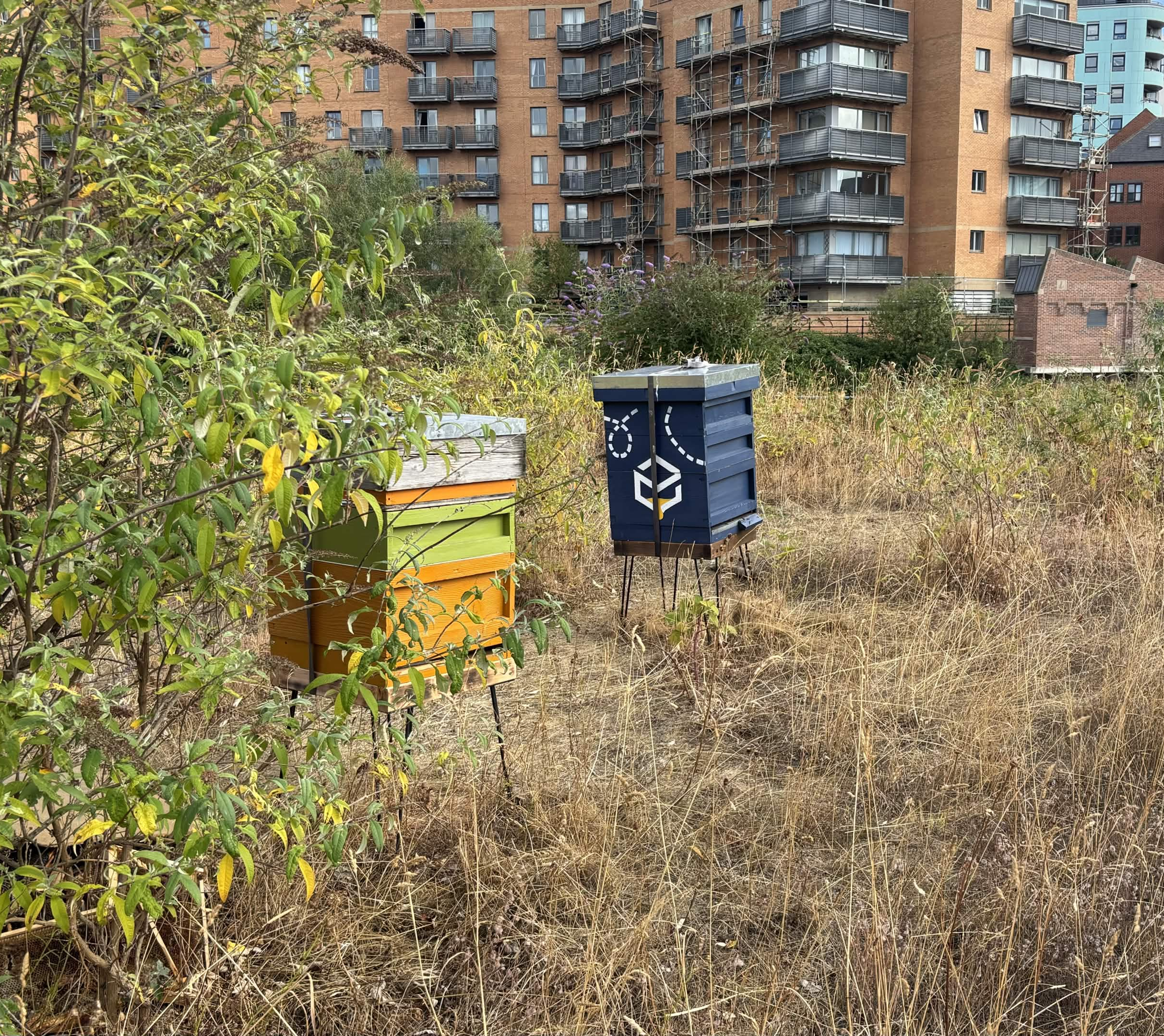
Beehives on the nature reserve. The nature reserve on Fearns Island is home to some 40,000 bees. Taken during the 2026 England heatwaves, so the foliage is particularly dry and yellow.

=== Nature Reserve ===
In 2010, following a similar scheme in nearby Holbeck, a local proposal was made to transform the northern half of the island into a nature reserve, in response to the abandonment of the buildings on the island. The proposal went through, and the buildings were demolished in 2016. The area is now a nature reserve and is inaccessible to the public.

In March 2026, following repeated cases of anti-social behaviour in the nature reserve, there were plans by the Canal & River Trust to turn part of North Fearn's Island into a community space, likely a public garden. The plan received pushback from local councillors. Labour councillor Paul Wray expressed criticism towards the Trust for their lack of communication with local communities. Green Party councillor Ed Carlisle has expressed direct opposition to any plans to reduce the size of the nature reserve. Following backlash, in May 2026, the Canal & River Trust publicly released proposed plans to focus primarily on habitat improvements and repair work on and around the island, as well as improved safety precautions for the public areas.

== Legacy ==
Fearns Island has had a limited legacy in the area, having been described in local newspapers as a "secret island" that continues to inspire people's imaginations. In 2023, a bar and restaurant opened in Leeds Dock named Fearns, taking its name from the island. The Yorkshire Evening Post has also described the island as their fourth best location for picnics in Leeds.

== Gallery ==
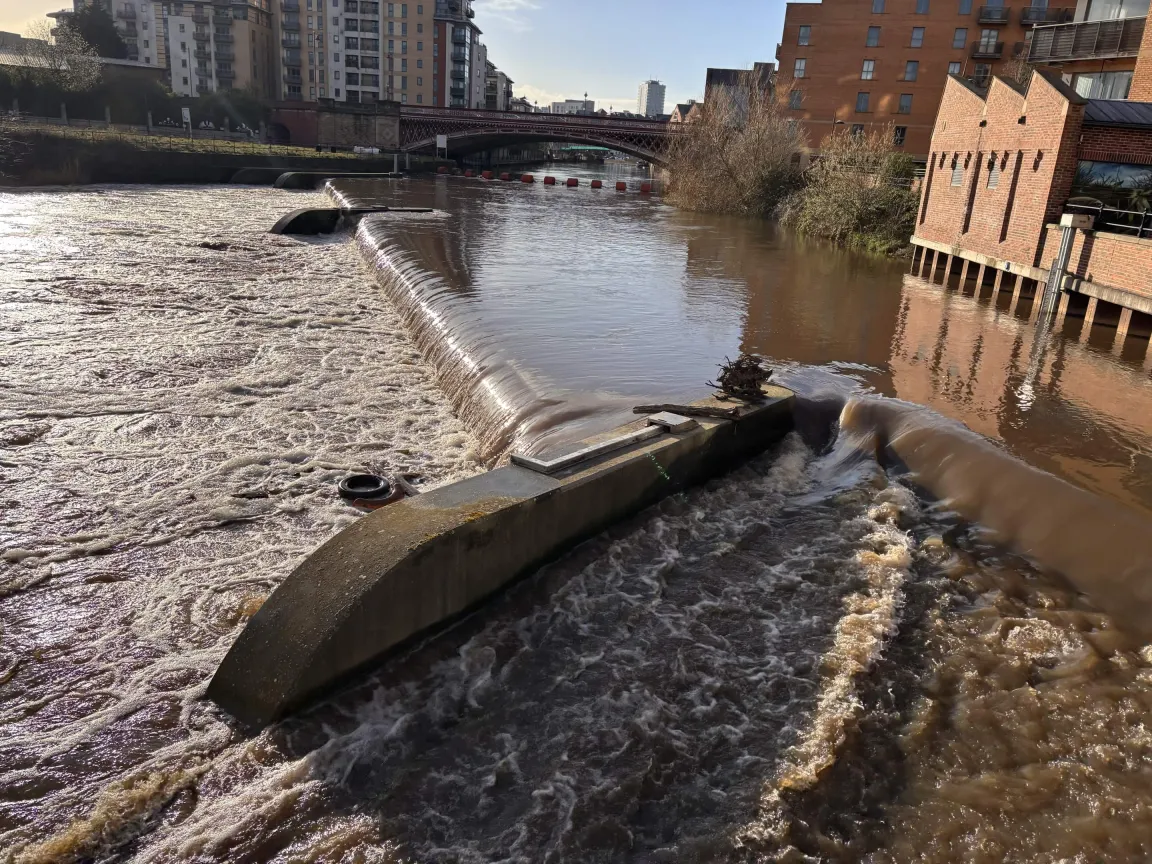
Leeds Dam seen from Fearn's Wharf. The current dam was installed in 2017 following a series of floods on Boxing Day 2015.

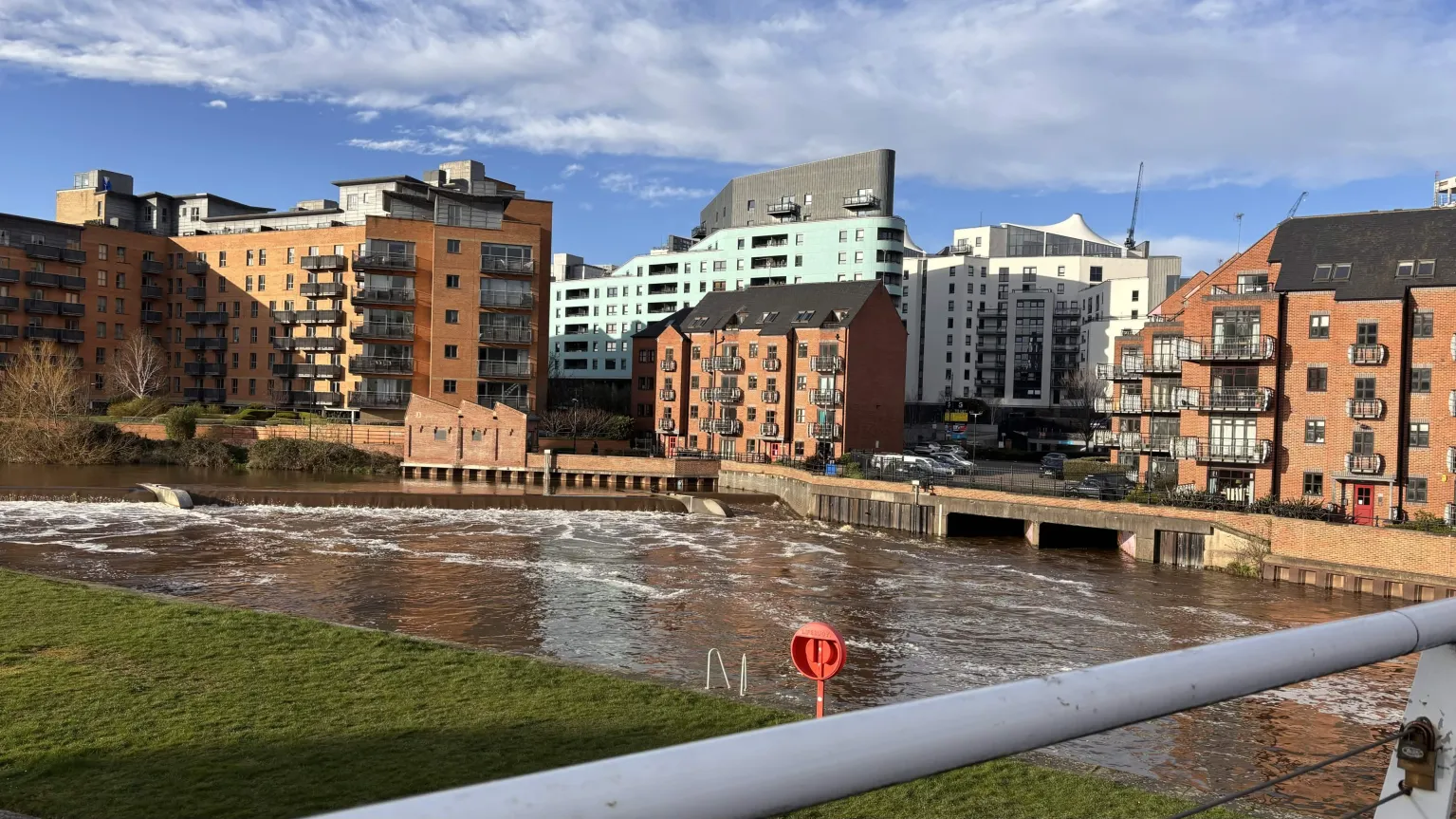
Leeds Dam seen from Knight's Way Footbridge. The discharge point of Timble Beck is also visible.

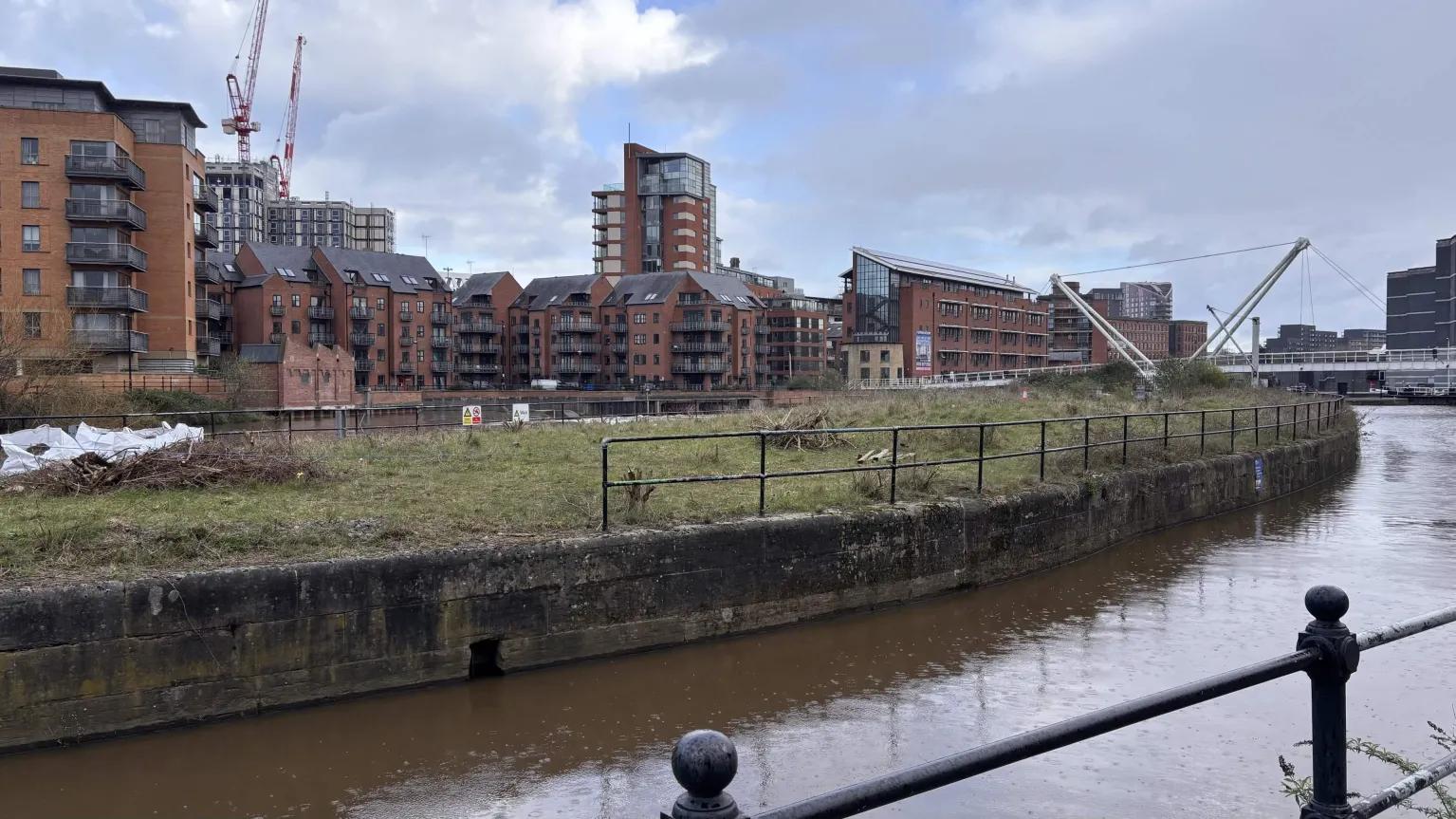
Fearns Island Nature Reserve, very closely visible from the northern entrance to Leeds Dock. The area is currently inaccessible to the public.

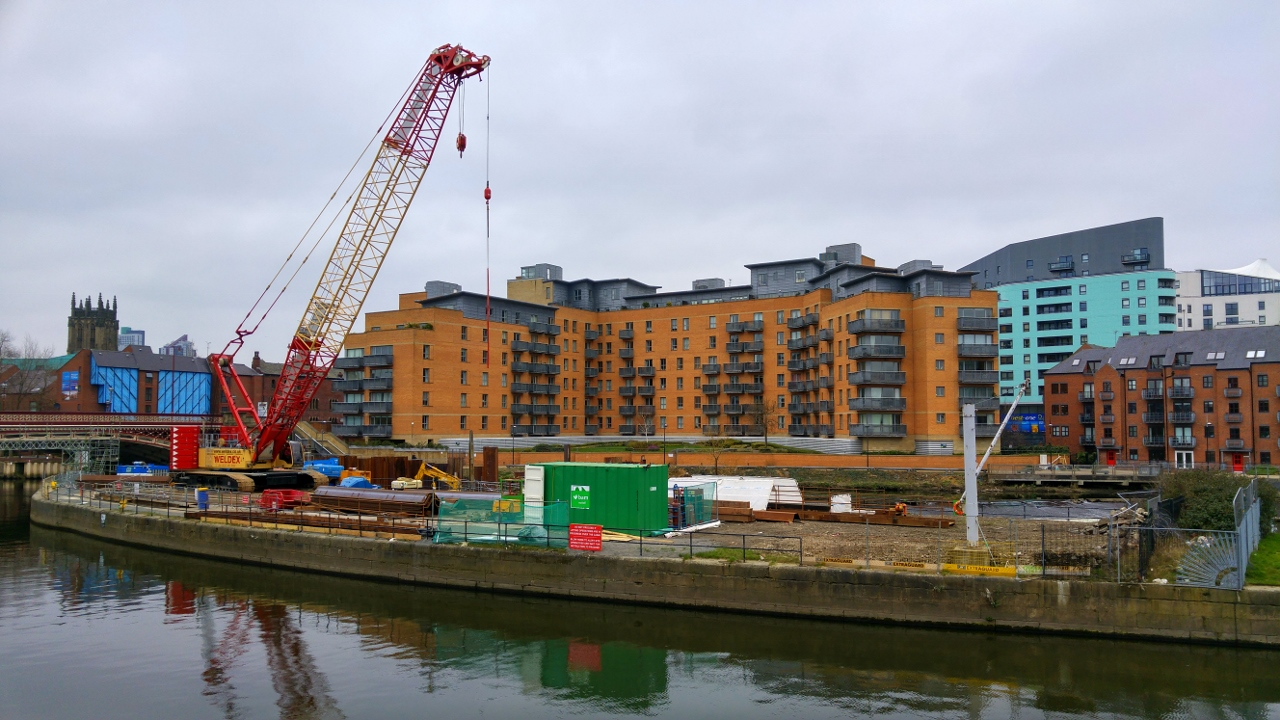
Demolition of the buildings on North Fearn's Island in 2016.

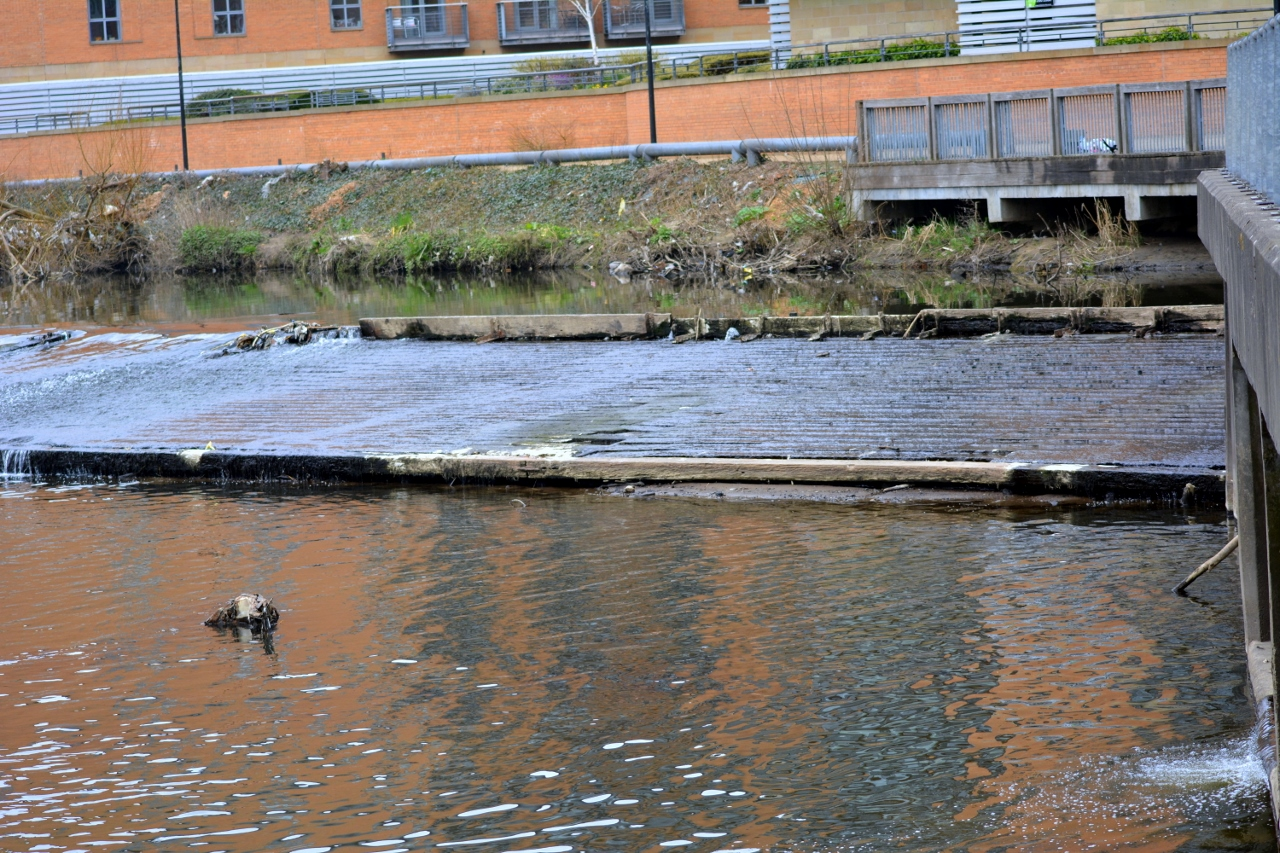
The pre-2017 immobile dam, deemed unfit for purpose following the 2015 Boxing Day Floods.

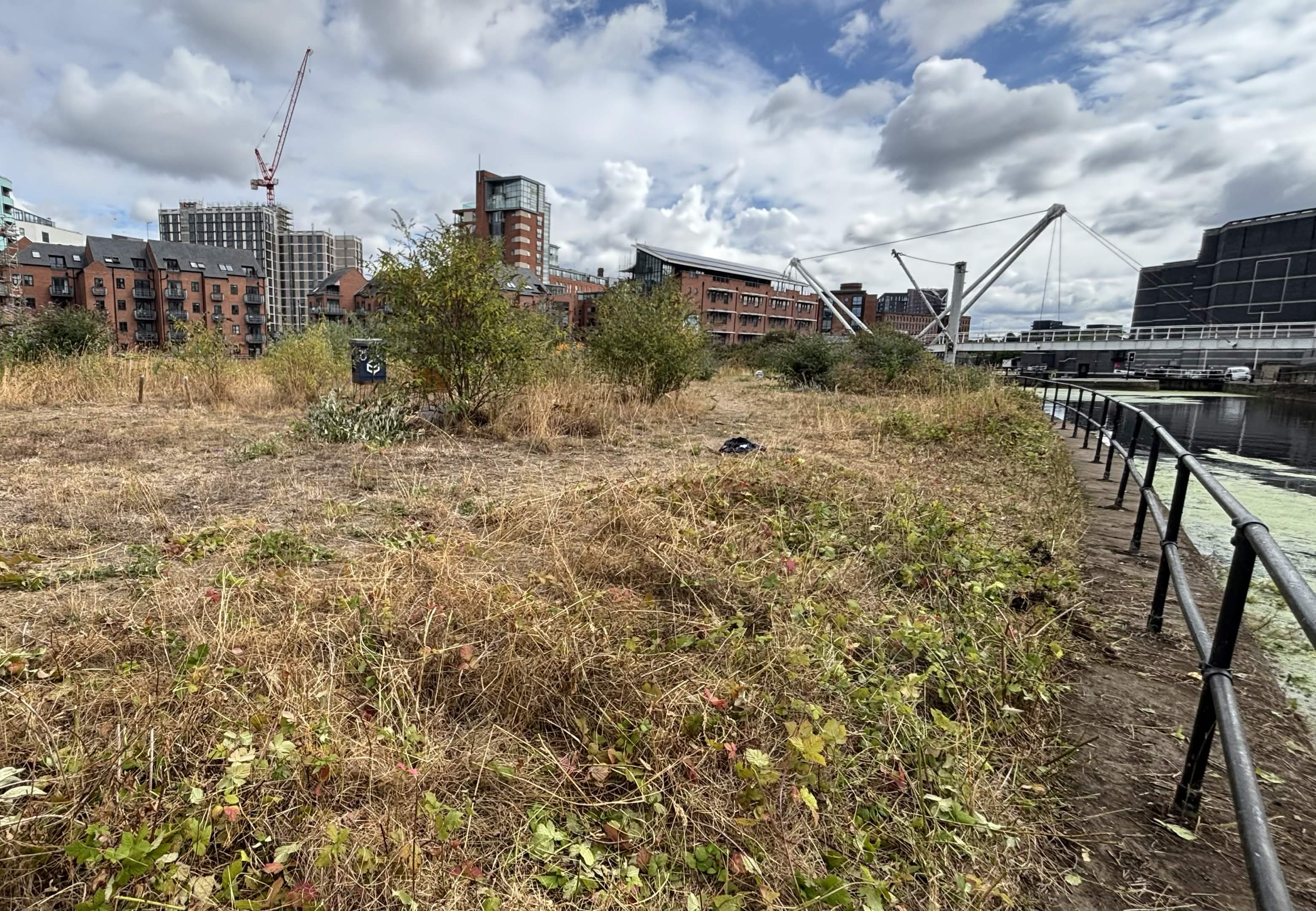
Fearns Island Nature Reserve. Taken during the 2026 England heatwaves, so the foliage is particularly dry and yellow.
