= The American Library =

Contemporary installation art piece by Yinka Shonibare

- Part of the artwork as exhibited in 2018
- Artist: Yinka Shonibare
- Year: 2018
- Subject: Immigration to the United States
- Preceded by: The British Library
- Followed by: The African Library
- Website: www.theamericanlibraryinstallation.com/about

The American Library is a 2018 contemporary art installation artwork piece by British-Nigerian artist Yinka Shonibare comprising 6,000 books of different sizes wrapped in Dutch wax printed cotton; 3,200 of the books carry names of immigrants, or the descendants of recent immigrants, to the United States who have had an impact on American culture. It was conceived as a reaction to Donald Trump's anti-immigration rhetoric.

== Concept ==
The American Library was commissioned by the FRONT contemporary art program of the Museum of Contemporary Art Cleveland, sponsored by the VIA art fund and James Cohan Gallery. Cleveland Public Library was involved in the project, which features thousands of stylized books, many of these bearing names of people related to immigration to the United States. The artwork is a reaction to growing anti-immigration discourse, with artist Yinka Shonibare specifically citing emerging issues with DREAMers and a Mexican border wall. He told Artnet that "For all [Donald Trump's] rhetoric, America is highly dependent on other countries, as other countries are highly dependent on the United States", adding:

It is really a project about immigration to highlight immigrants' achievements in different fields. Some of them are artists, scientists, architects and filmmakers. In the context of American First, xenophobia, and nationalism around the world, and Brexit in Britain as well, I wanted to highlight their achievements.

— Yinka Shonibare

Trump, who is of Scottish and German descent, is one of the names featured on the books.

== Design ==
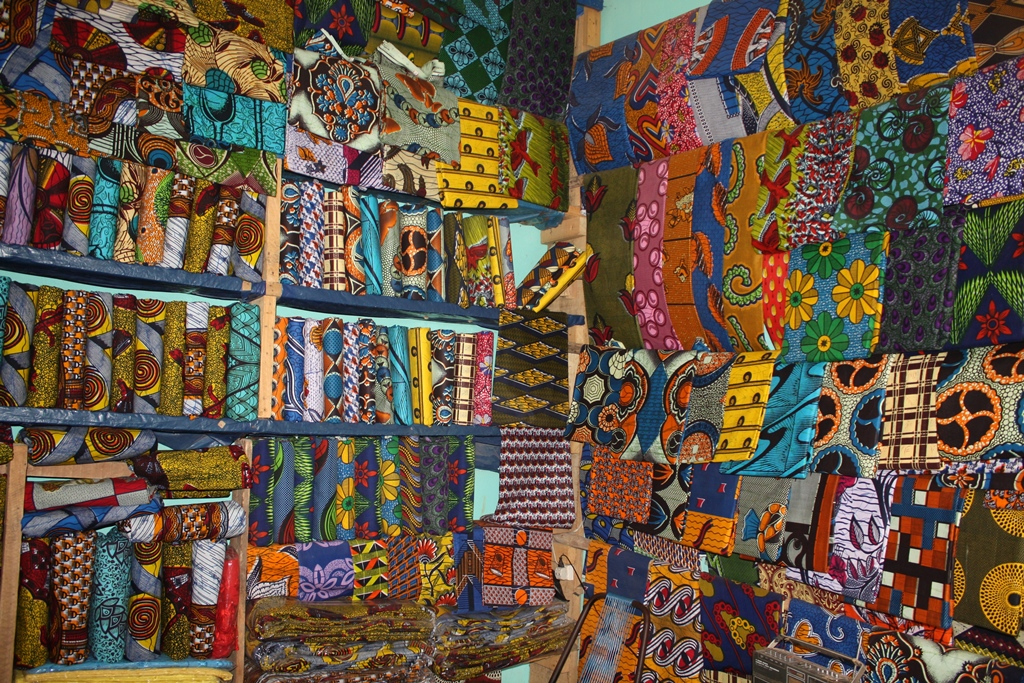
Waxprints in a West African shop

The hardback books comprising the installation are wrapped in Dutch wax textiles. The use of these waxprints is a trademark of British-Nigerian artist Yinka Shonibare, whose artworks typically focus on colonialism and globalization. Based on Indonesian batik, produced in the Netherlands, and sold in West Africa, the textiles are common in his Nigerian homeland. Shonibare said that the multicultural nature makes them a "perfect metaphor" for The American Library, which aims to represent the multicultural history of the United States. The books are different in height and width, representing the diversity of experiences.

Of the 6,000 books, 3,200 have names in gold foil on the spine. Many of these names belong to immigrants or the descendants of recent immigrants "who [have] contributed significantly to the arts, science, or culture"; most of these people have overcome discrimination, while others have anti-immigration stances despite their histories. The other names are of African Americans who migrated during the Great Migration from the American South to the North and figures related to the forced migration of Native Americans.

Shonibare's studio chose which names to include from a list researched and suggested by the Cleveland Public Library. Shonibare had asked the library researchers to find immigrants representing a broad range of people with diverse origins, professions, races and sexualities. Thousands of names were considered, with Collinwood librarian Mark Tidrick managing name suggestions and using the library's resources to verify immigration research. They also strove to include some Cleveland-related figures, to connect the work to its own origins. Shonibare said that the use of books, to bear the names of immigrants, "act as metaphors for the autobiography of the individuals named." The remaining books without names are left blank, "inviting interpretation: They could represent stories yet to be told, stories that are lost, or stories that will never be told by those who want to come here and can't."

== Locations ==
In 2018, the installation was shown at the Cleveland Public Library's Brett Hall as part of FRONT's An American City program. Shonibare felt that it was appropriate to display the work in libraries because it "is archival in its content and is essentially about mining the stories of immigrants to the United States from across the globe"; it was displayed on a large open bookcase and widely praised by visiting critics. Cleveland Public Library wanted to show the work to initiate discussion on what it called a "timely topic".

First displayed in mid-2018, the installation debuted shortly after another 2018 Shonibare work based on migration, Wind Sculpture (SG) I, was installed in the Doris C. Freedman Plaza at Central Park. Later in 2018, The American Library was shown at Davidson College Art Galleries along with Wind Sculpture (SG) I. In a presentation at Davidson College, Shonibare said artists cannot change the world but their art can inspire regular people to pressure politicians.

The installation was exhibited at the Speed Art Museum in 2019. It was shown in the 1927 galleries, a building which originally housed a library when the museum was first opened. Accompanying The American Library was a selection of Shonibare's sculptures already in the collections of the Speed and 21c Museum Hotels, which co-presented the exhibition. The sculptures included The Three Graces (2001), The Wanderer (2007), The Age of Enlightenment – Gabrielle Émilie Le Tonnelier de Breteuil, Marquise du Châtelet (2008), The Sleep of Reason Produces Monsters (2008), and Food Faerie (2010).

From 2019 to 2020, it was shown at the Institute of Contemporary Art, Boston, as the finale piece of the "When Home Won't Let You Stay: Migration through Contemporary Art" exhibition. This exhibition then toured the United States, displaying at the Minneapolis Institute of Art in 2020 and Stanford University in 2021.

=== Exhibition ===
When the installation is exhibited, the books cannot be removed from the shelves or touched. Instead, the exhibition features iPad stations, with each tablet containing an interactive database about all the people named. When shown in Cleveland, the tablets also contained searchable visual and audio materials telling stories of immigration. The database was also added to the artwork's website; LEO Weekly said that this aspect was symbolic of "taking the installation beyond its physical space and emphasizing the truly global nature of humanity", and that "By offering the data without editorial, a neutral space is created."

When shown at Speed, overview text was translated into Spanish, Arabic, Somali, and Nepalese by refugees through a Kentucky Refugees Ministry program.

== Collections ==
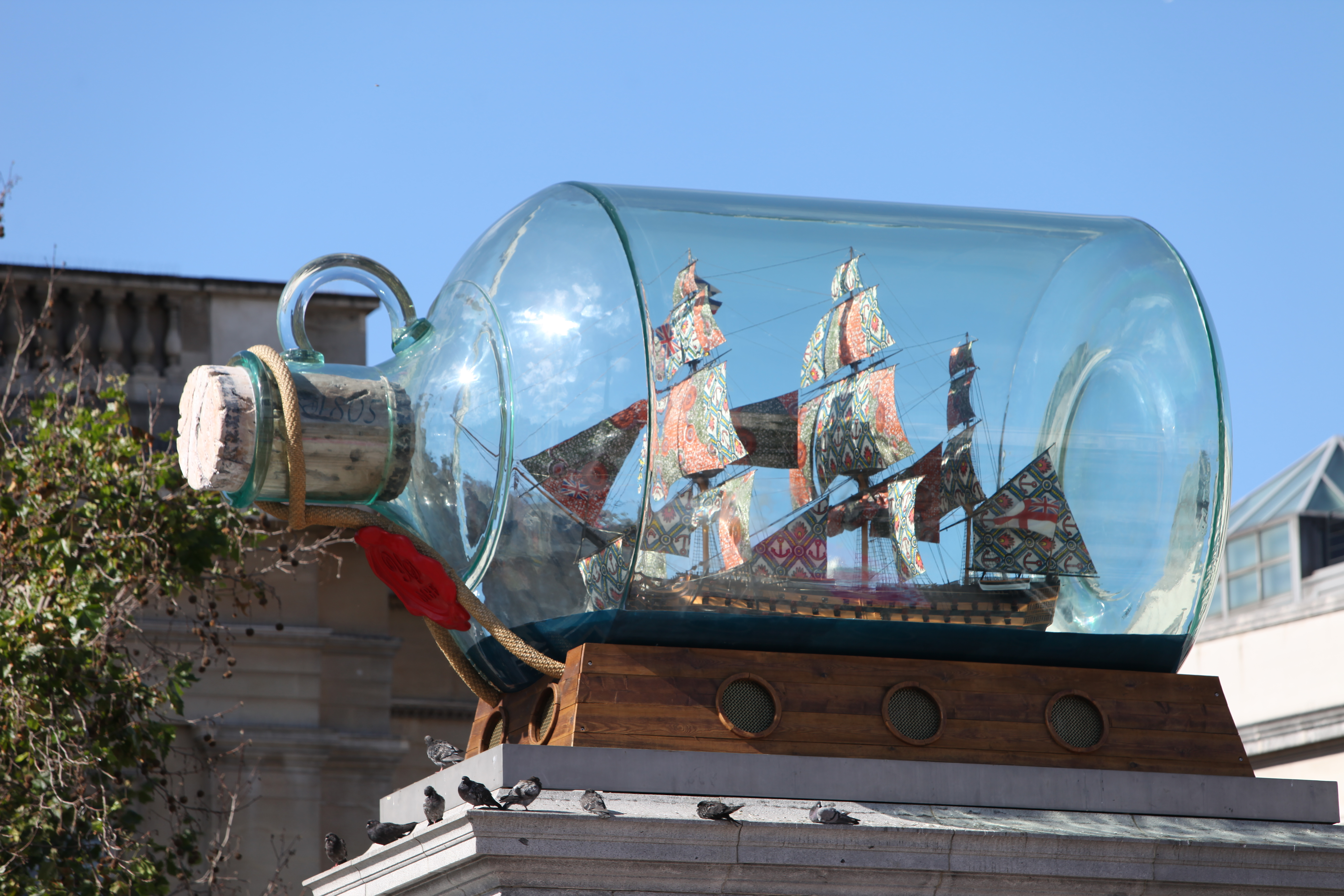
Shonibare's Nelson's Ship in a Bottle was one work displayed alongside the American Library books.

Spin-off collections of some of the books based on the named people's areas of influence were created.

The American Library Collection (Activists) featured 233 books and was first displayed in 2018 at the Mead Art Museum, accompanied by Shonibare's Girl Balancing Knowledge and Nelson's Ship in a Bottle. The museum curation said that as well as the narratives on immigration, this collection "serves as a commentary about which people and what ideas get published and thereby become part of public discourse."

The American Library Collection (Female Philanthropists), with about 225 books, was displayed in 2019.

== See also ==
- Immigration policy of Donald Trump
