= The African Library =

- Artist: Yinka Shonibare
- Year: 2018
- Subject: European colonisation and liberation of Africa
- Preceded by: The American Library
- Website: www.theafricanlibraryinstallation.com

The African Library is a piece of installation art created in 2018 by British-Nigerian artist Yinka Shonibare, based on his previous successful works The British Library and The American Library. It features books wrapped in Dutch wax printed cotton with named of prominent Africans on the spines. Shonibare intended the piece as commentary on the African struggle for liberation in European colonies, and the ability of Africans to be successful post-liberation.

== Locations ==
It was displayed at the Goodman Gallery in 2018 and Museum der Moderne Salzburg in 2021.

== Collections ==
Two 2020 spin-off collections, titled The African Library Collection: Writers and The African Library Collection: Musicians, were sold by the Goodman Gallery.
