= Oluwale =

Oluwale is both a surname and given name. Notable people with the name include:

- David Oluwale (1930–1969), British Nigerian who drowned in Leeds having been assaulted by police officers
- Oluwale Bamgbose (born 1987), Nigerian-American mixed martial artist
