= The Young Chefs =

Canadian children's television series

- Genre: cooking
- Presented by: Jehane Benoît
- Country of origin: Canada
- Original language: English
- No. of seasons: 1

Production
- Production companies: Inter-Video; Nielsen-Ferns

Original release
- Network: CBC Television
- Release: 6 October – 29 December 1976

The Young Chefs is a Canadian children's television program on food preparation which originally aired on CBC Television in late 1976.

== Premise ==
Jehane Benoît hosted this program at her family's sheep farm, Noirmouton, near Sutton, Quebec. She was joined by Lisa Schwartz and Karim Kovacevic, the "young chefs" who learned various aspects of food and its preparation.

== Scheduling ==
This half-hour program was broadcast on Wednesdays from 6 October to 29 December 1976 at 5:00 p.m. It was repeated in late 1977 and mid-1978.
