= Hibiscus Rising =

Sculpture by Yinka Shonibare in Leeds

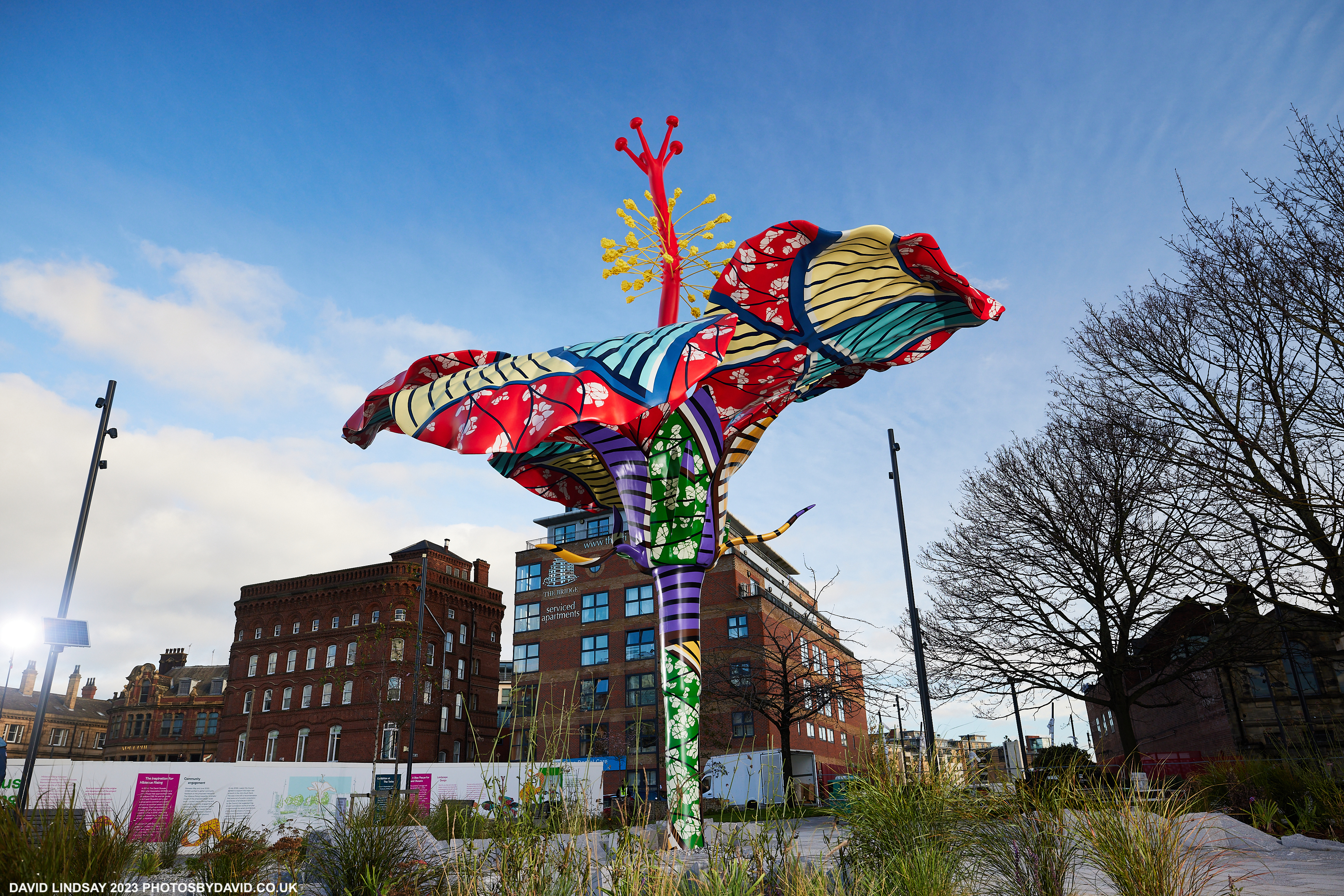
- Artist: Yinka Shonibare
- Year: 2023
- Subject: David Oluwale
- Dimensions: 950 cm (370 in)
- Location: Leeds; 53°47′33″N 1°32′31″W

Hibiscus Rising (2023) is an outdoor sculpture in Leeds, England, by artist Yinka Shonibare which was unveiled on 24 November 2023 as part of LEEDS 2023. It commemorates the life and death of David Oluwale, a British-Nigerian man whose death in 1969 involved two members of Leeds City Police. Commissioned by LEEDS 2023 and the David Oluwale Memorial Association (DOMA), in partnership with Leeds City Council, the sculpture is, according to academic Dr. Emily Zobel Marshall, the first public artwork in the city to reflect its cultural diversity.

== Background ==
David Oluwale (1930–1969) was a British Nigerian who was drowned in the River Aire in Leeds, West Riding of Yorkshire, in 1969. The events leading to his drowning have been described as "the physical and psychological destruction of a homeless, black man whose brutal, systematic harassment was orchestrated by members of the Leeds city police force". This culminated in his death by drowning: two independent witnesses testified that they saw uniformed police officers chasing a man who could well have been Oluwale close to the river on the night he is believed to have drowned.

The officers involved were convicted, marking the first time that British police had been held responsible for involvement in the death of a black person. The David Oluwale Memorial Association (DOMA) was established as a charity in 2012 (although it had been first convened as a community committee at Leeds Beckett University in 2007). Its goals are to help people remember David Oluwale's experience in Leeds and to educate and campaign for social justice for migrants, the homeless, people with mental health issues and people subjected to racism or police malpractice.

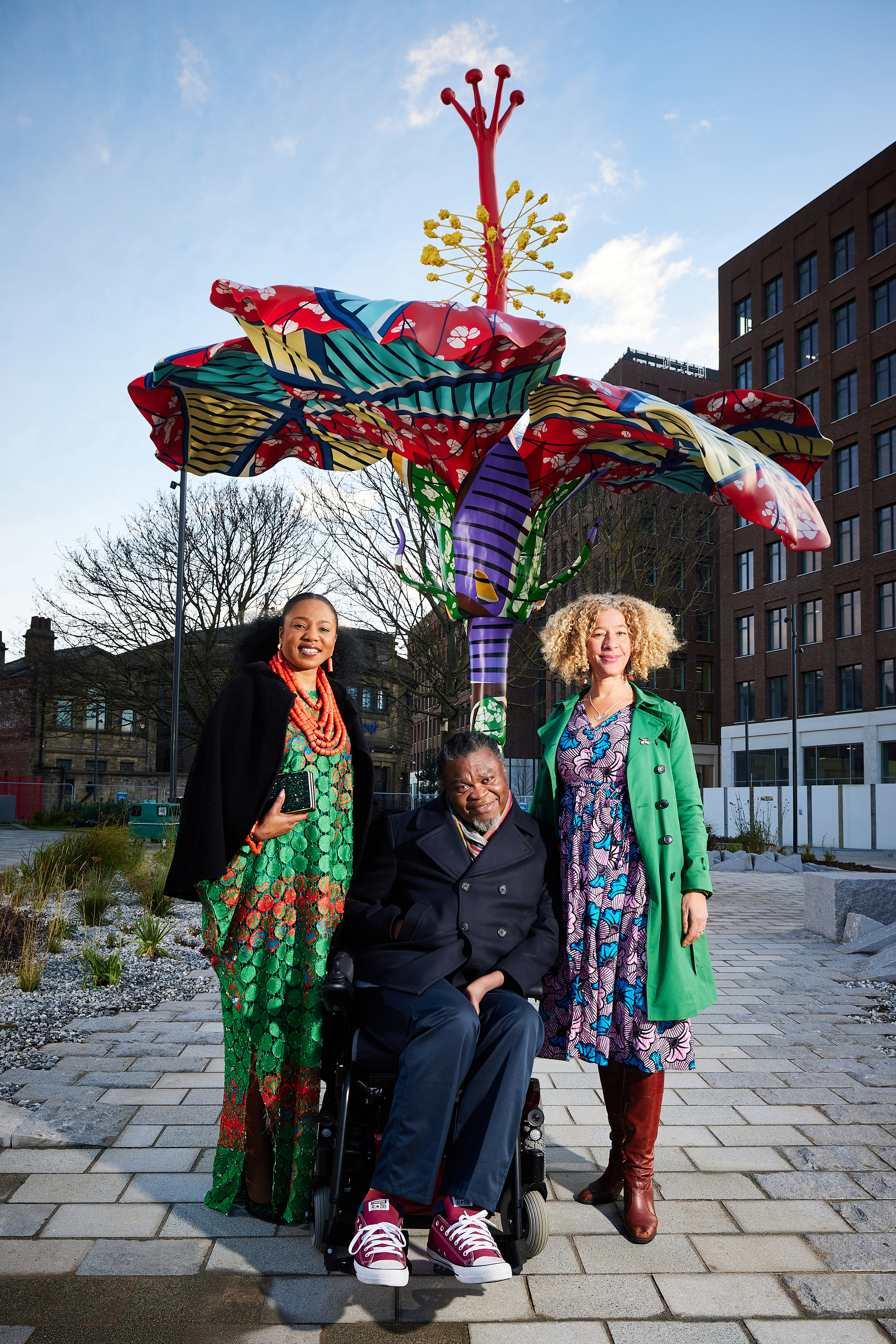
Yinka Shonibare CBE RA, Cllr Abigail Marshall-Katung and Dr Emily Zobel Marshall from DOMA in front of Hibiscus Rising

The sculpture was the result of many years of campaigning and fundraising by the David Oluwale Memorial Association. It was supported by Leeds City Council and the commissioning and construction was supported by LEEDS 2023, as part of the year of culture. Donors included the Art Fund, Arts Council England, David Lascelles and Diane Howse, Earl and Countess of Harewood, the Scurrah–Wainwright Trust, and the Henry Moore Foundation, as well as a gala dinner and members of the public donating via a crowdfunder appeal. The Art Fund's support included a £200,000 grant. An accompanying engagement programme was supported by a National Lottery Heritage Fund award of £48,588.

== Location ==
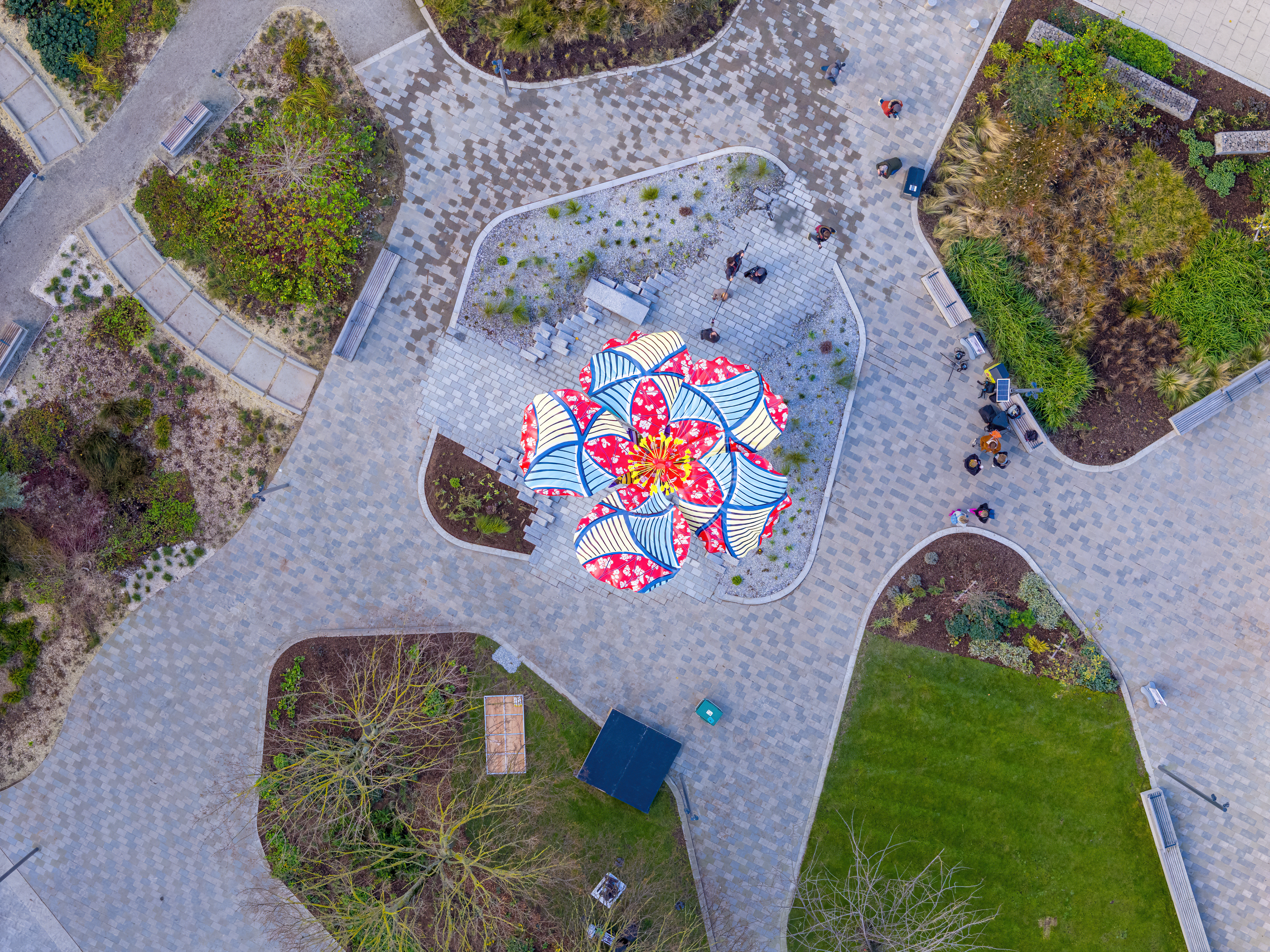
Hibiscus Rising sculpture from above, showing Aire Park

Sited in Meadow Lane in Aire Park, the sculpture was unveiled as part of LEEDS 2023, the city's unofficial year of culture. The sculpture is 9.5 metres (31 ft) tall. Its depicts a giant hibiscus flower, whose surface is decorated with wax-cloth inspired designs.

Aire Park is close to the David Oluwale footbridge over the River Aire, as well as Leeds Bridge, where a blue plaque also commemorates David Oluwale.

== Conception ==
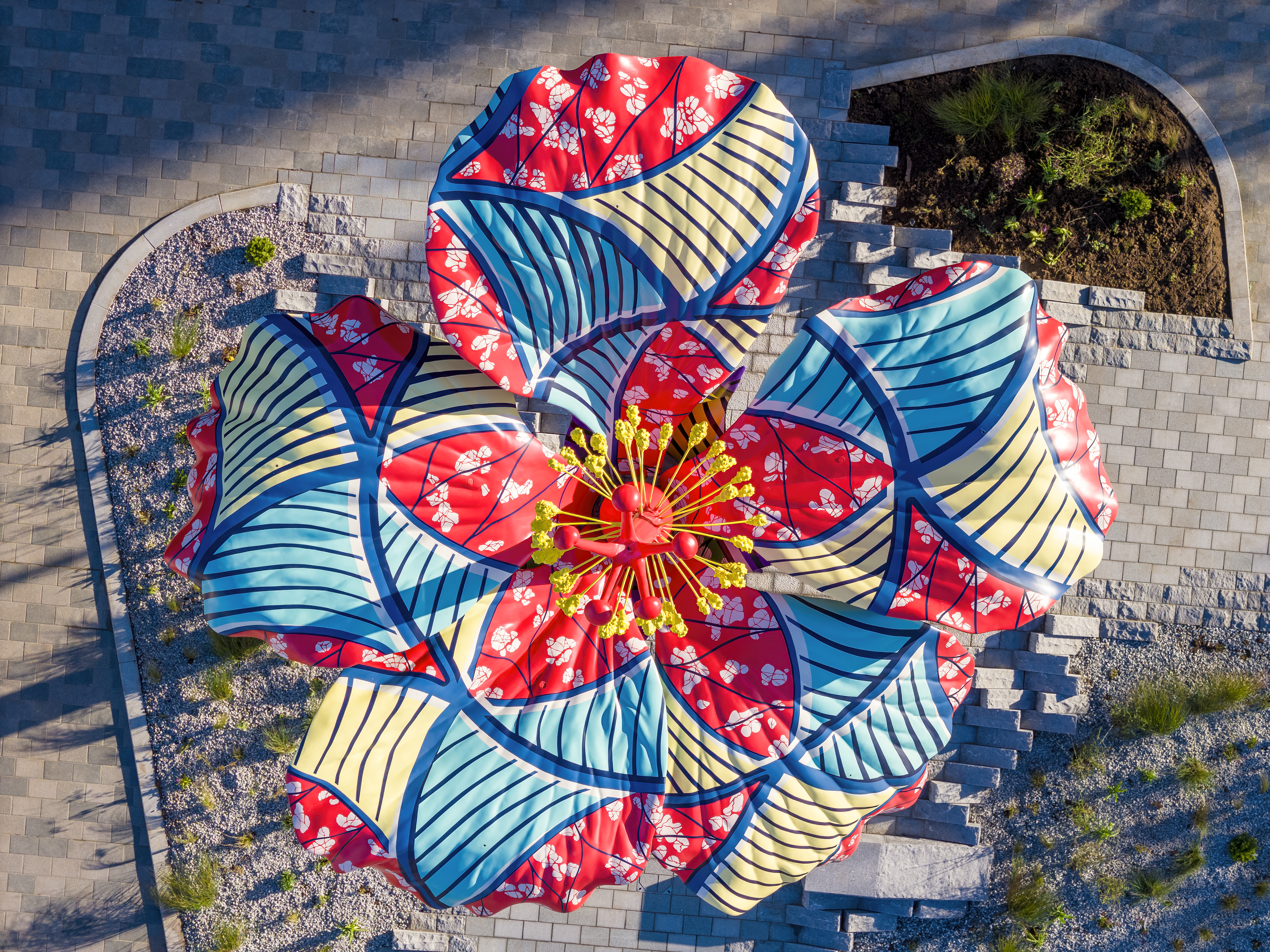
Hibiscus Rising sculpture from above

The David Oluwale Memorial Association's concept was to create a memorial garden for David Oluwale with a sculpture that would inspire "conscience, altruism and hope". Their brief to Yinka Shonibare outlined a meeting place that would be playful and attractive to everyone. When discussing the ideas behind the sculpture, Shonibare said that he wanted to focus on joy and healing as themes, rather than the circumstances of Oluwale's death. Drawing on a childhood in Nigeria where hibiscus flowers were commonplace, Shonibare felt that the associations of the flower with "beauty, love, empathy, passion" were fitting. The flower is covered with brightly coloured batik-inspired patterns, which are a common motif in Shonibare's works. Further inspiration for the work came from Maya Angelou's poem "Still I Rise".

The maquette for the sculpture was previously displayed in an exhibition at The Tetley from September 2022 to January 2023. This exhibition took place after the maquette had featured in a city-wide engagement programme led by DOMA. The maquette is now located in Leeds City Museum.

== Reception ==
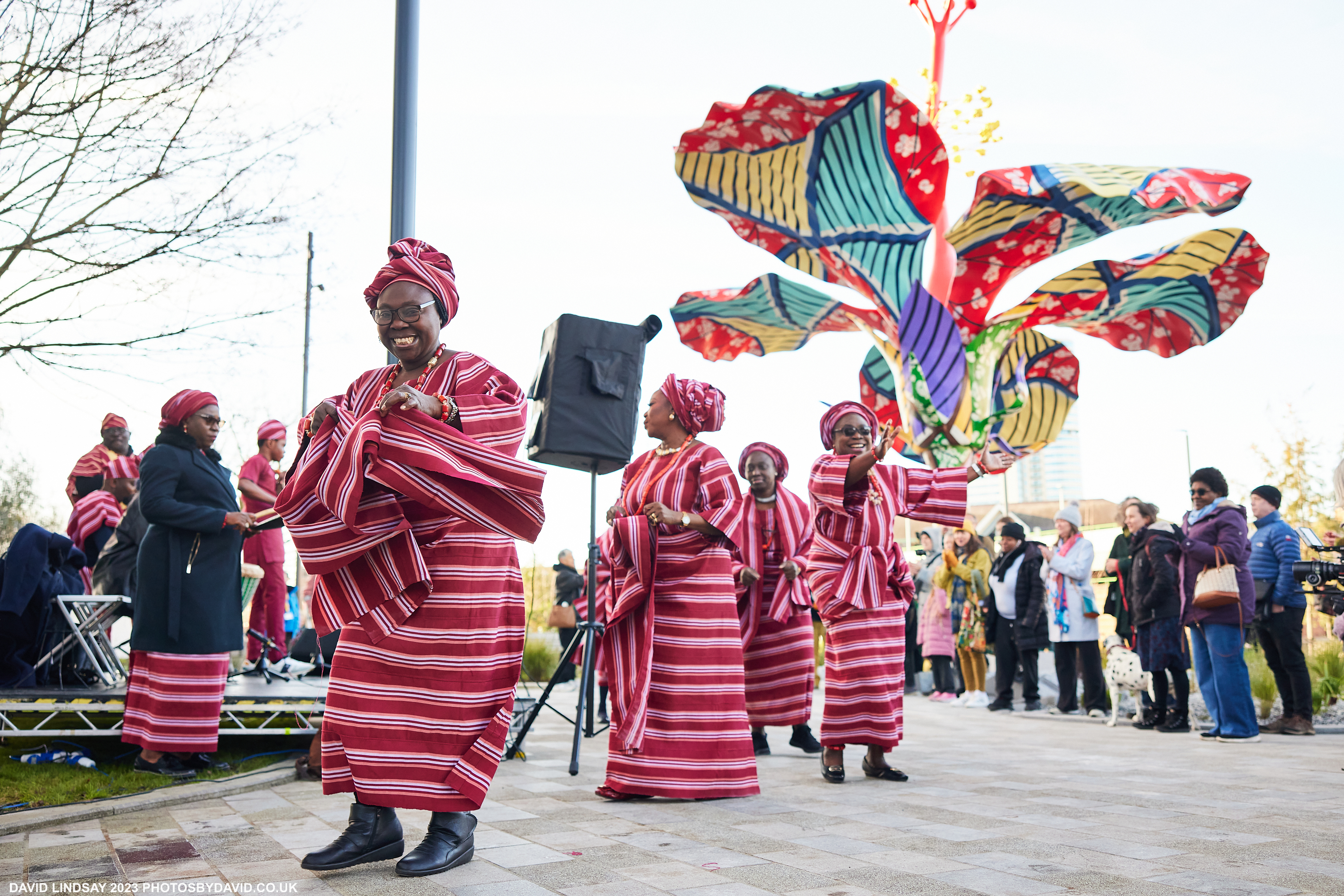
Yoruba group dancing in front of Hibiscus Rising sculpture at launch weekend

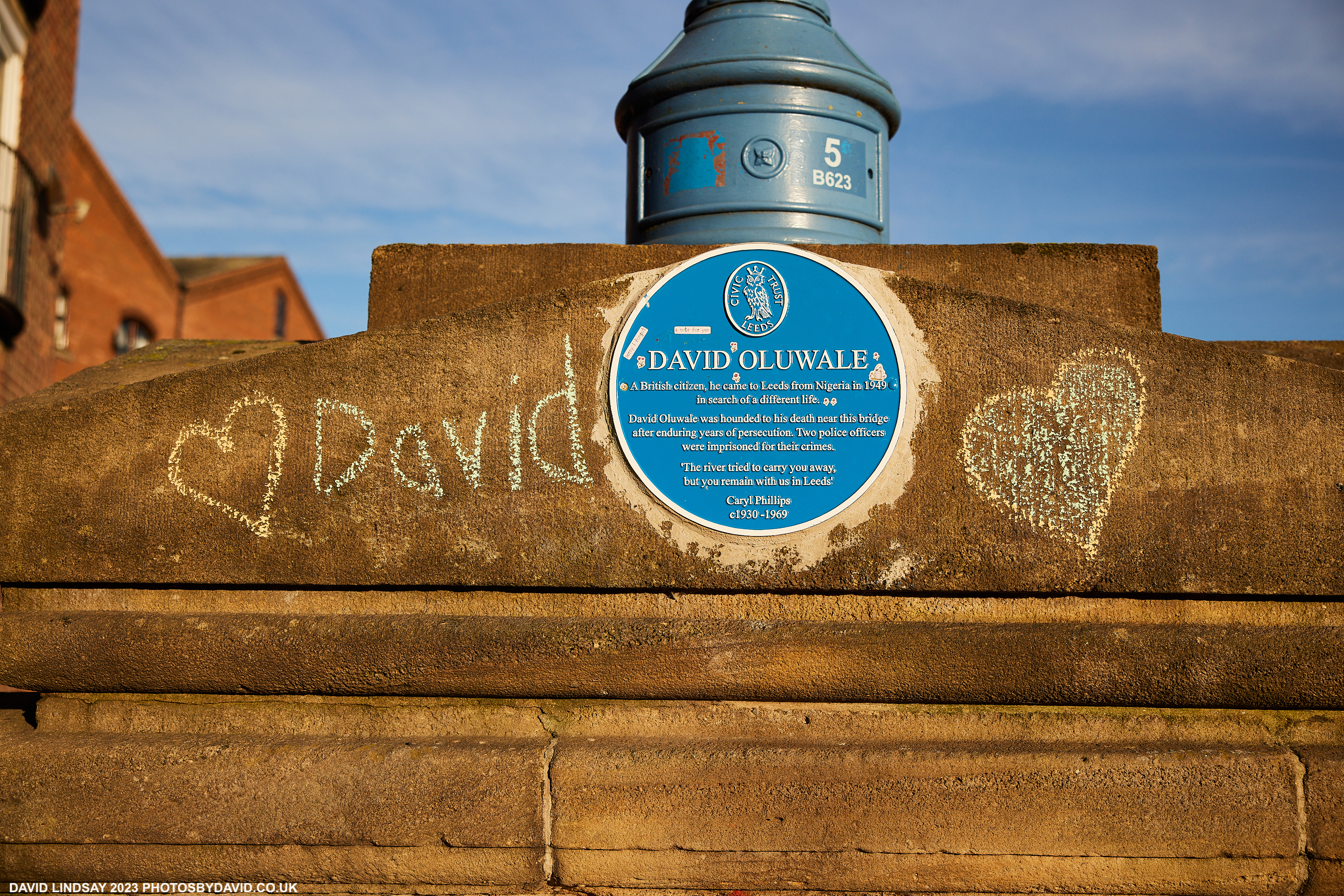
Blue plaque commemorating David Oluwale on Leeds bridge, on launch weekend of Hibiscus Rising

Co-chair of the David Oluwale Memorial Association, Emily Zobel Marshall, described the sculpture as the first public work in the city that "reflects the cultural diversity of our people". She also described it as "our Angel of the North ... a landmark sculpture."

During the development of the scheme, researcher and co-secretary to DOMA Max Farrar described the reasons for Oluwale's memorialisation in the following terms:

David Oluwale is not to be one of those working class people who are 'hidden from history'. He is to be remembered as both victim and agent, a man who struggled perpetually against insuperable odds to make a good life as a migrant to Britain.

— Max Farrar, Remembering David Oluwale, Leeds African Studies Bulletin no. 78

Previous efforts to commemorate David Oluwale by Leeds Civic Trust's Blue Plaque scheme were vandalised in a racially motivated attack. The David Oluwale footbridge was unveiled after this event.
