= Battle of Lottorf =

Part of the First Schleswig War

- Part of the First Schleswig War
Date	24 November 1850
Location	Lottorf, Schleswig-Holstein
Result	Danish victory

Belligerents
Duchy of Schleswig; Duchy of Holstein	Denmark

Commanders and leaders
Karl Wilhelm von Willisen	(Denmark) Christian Bauditz

Strength
Unknown	52+

Casualties and losses
1 killed 1 wounded	None

The Battle of Lottorf was fought between Denmark, and the Duchies of Schleswig and Holstein, on November 24, 1850, at Lottorf in Schleswig and was the final battle of the First Schleswig War. The Danish forces under Christian Bauditz won the battle.

== Background ==
The commander of Schleswig-Holstein's army, General Karl Wilhelm von Willisen, tried to draw Denmark into sending its troops to Holstein, as he hoped that this deployment into a German province would result in the German states re-entering the war against Denmark, and he hoped that a Danish invasion would allow him to defeat it in detail. Unhappy with the lack of success this strategy was producing, the leadership of Schleswig Holstein pressured Willisen to go onto the offensive, which began by August 1850. During the offensive, in the area north of Rendsburg and to the east around Eckernforde, skirmishes took place in many villages, including Lottorf. Four took place in that settlement between August and November. In November 1850, Schleswig Holstein planned to attack the Danish outpost located there.

== Prelude ==
The attack would be made by two companies of the Schleswig-Holsteinian 11th Infantry Battalion. One would be kept in reserve to the south of the village, whilst the other one would be split into two parts. One part would attack the village from the front, and the other would move against it from the west. By the evening of November 23, the two companies had taken up their positions. The Danish garrison was drawn from the 3rd Reserve Jager Corps, and it was made up of fewer men than the Schleswig-Holsteins against them.

== Battle ==
The Schleswig-Holsteins began their advance at 3:30 pm. The darkness did not prevent Danish sentries from quickly detecting the enemy movement, which allowed a defence to be organised. Not having the manpower to defend all of the village, the Danish troops withdrew to defend a farm on its northern outskirts. The farmhouse was then occupied by Danish troops, and the Schleswig-Holsteins attacked it, setting fire to the building by their shots. The Danes then fought from behind fences and other cover to the north, and were reinforced by two more soldiers. Another Danish-occupied village, Over Selk, was informed of the attack, and it dispatched 50 soldiers to assist the garrison. When they arrived, a counter-attack was started, and the Danes were able to fight into the now-burning village. The Schleswig-Holsteins withdrew from Lottorf by 4:30 pm.

== Aftermath ==
The Danes did not try to pursue the Schleswig-Holsteins. Due to the brief duration of the battle, and darkness followed by fires leading to limited visibility which resulted in a confused fight, the casualties sustained by both sides was light. No Danish deaths were reported, and Schleswig-Holstein recorded one dead and one wounded. The battle prolonged the war, which did not end until early 1851.
