= Jehane Benoît =

Canadian chef (1904–1987)

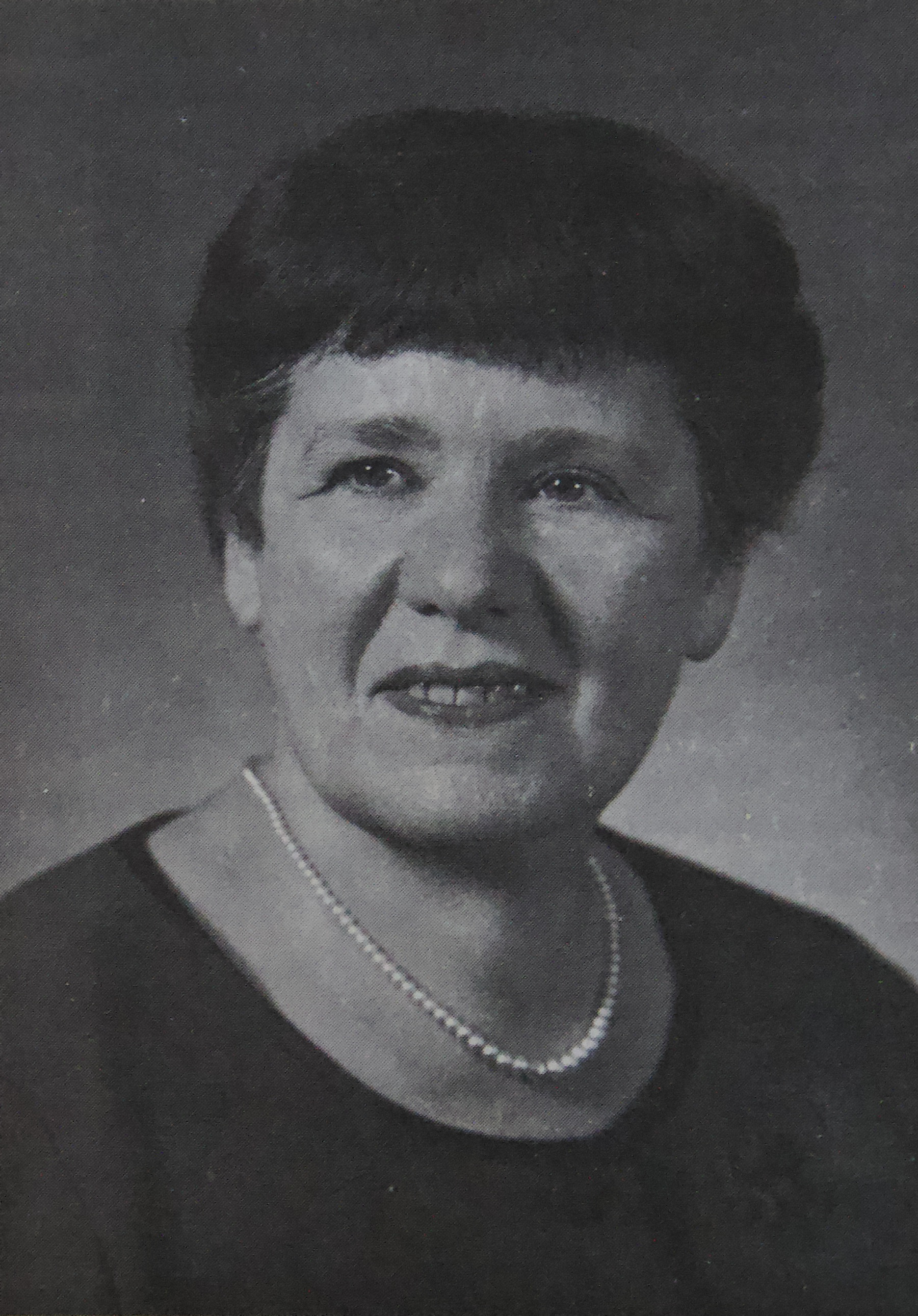
- Born: Jehane Patenaude; March 22, 1904; Montreal, Quebec, Canada
- Died: November 24, 1987 (aged 83); Sutton, Quebec, Canada
- Education: Sorbonne and Le Cordon Bleu
- Culinary career
- Award won: Officer of the Order of Canada

Jehane Benoît OC (French pronunciation: [ʒan bənwa]; née Patenaude [pat(ə)nod]; March 21, 1904 – November 24, 1987) was a Canadian culinary author, speaker, commentator, journalist and broadcaster.

Benoît was born into a wealthy family in Westmount, Quebec, with a father and grandfather who were food connoisseurs. After studying at the Sorbonne and Le Cordon Bleu cooking school in Paris, she started her own cooking school, Fumet de la Vieille France, in Montreal. She also opened one of Canada's first vegetarian restaurants, "The Salad Bar", in 1935.

== Life ==
Best known as "Madame Benoît," she wrote 30 books during her career, including the Encyclopedia of Canadian Cuisine (currently out of print). She appeared regularly on CBC Television's Take 30 and later became a proponent of microwave cookery, writing several books on the subject as well as appearing in television commercials for Panasonic microwave ovens.

Benoît introduced traditional Québécois menu items to English-speaking Canadians, including the meat pie known in French as the Quebec Tourtière, Benoît's "iconic dish". She has been described by CBC's Joanne Bayly as a 1960s phenomenon.

In the 1950s, 60s and 70s, Benoît was Canada's cook. In both French and charmingly accented English, she was on radio and television, trying to improve how Canadians ate and how they cooked.

In 1973, she was made an Officer of the Order of Canada "for her contribution to this art in Canada".

In 2012, Marguerite Paulin and Marie Desjardins published Jehane Benoît's biography À la découverte de Jehane Benoît, le roman de la grande dame de la cuisine canadienne.

== Selected works ==
- Benoît, J. (1963). Encyclopedia of Canadian Cuisine. Les Messageries du Saint Laurent.
- Benoît, J. (1964). Secrets et recettes du cahier de ma grand'mère. Éditions Beauchemin.
- Benoît, J. (1970). The Canadiana Cookbook. Pagurian Press Ltd.
- Benoît, J. (1987). Microwave Food Fun. Saint-Lambert, Québec: Héritage.

=== Television series ===
- The Young Chefs (1976)

== Sources ==
- Order of Canada Citation
- Chrystine Brouillet: Jehane Benoît. Canadian cuisine's grande dame, in Legacy. How French Canadians shaped North America. McClelland & Stewart, Toronto 2016; réimpr. 2019 (ISBN 0771072392) p 259-278
- (in French) in: Bâtisseurs d'Amérique: Des canadiens français qui ont faite de l'histoire. Dir. André Pratte, Jonathan Kay. Éd. La Presse, Montréal 2016, p 125-146
- Claire Litt. "Madame Microwave: Meet Jehane Benoît, Canada’s grande dame of culinary nationalism." Distillations Magazine (November 20, 2025) https://www.sciencehistory.org/stories/magazine/madame-microwave/
