= Leeds City Police =

Defunct police force

Leeds City Police was the police force responsible for policing the city of Leeds in northern England from its formation in 1836, until 1974, when it was amalgamated under the Local Government Act 1972 with the Bradford City Police and part of the West Yorkshire Constabulary to form the West Yorkshire Police.
