= Nelson's Ship in a Bottle =

Artwork by Yinka Shonibare

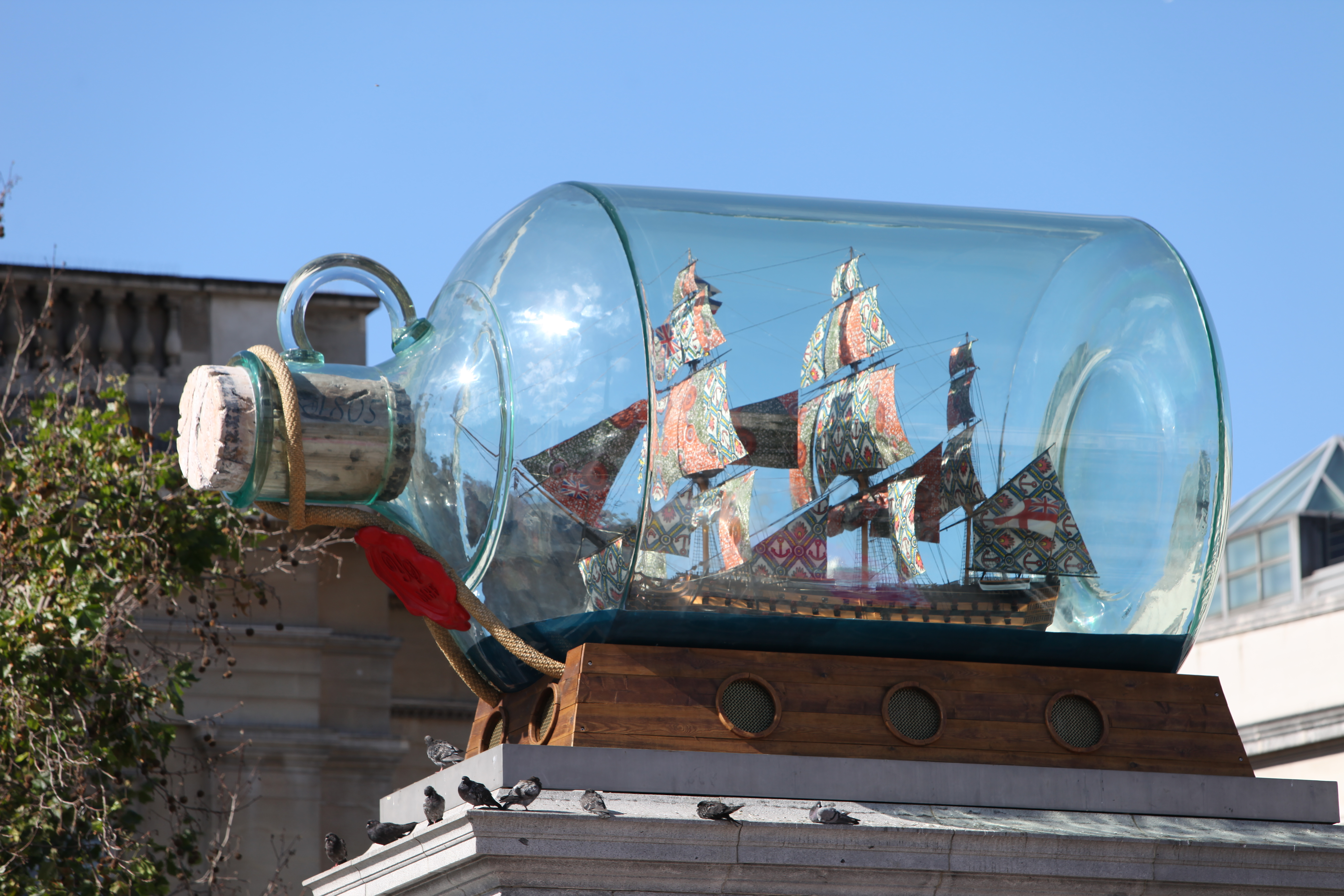
- Nelson's Ship in a Bottle displayed on the Fourth Plinth in Trafalgar Square, London (2010)
- Artist: Yinka Shonibare
- Year: 2010
- Subject: HMS Victory
- Dimensions: 280 cm × 250 cm × 500 cm (110 in × 98 in × 200 in)
- Location: National Maritime Museum, London; 51.48030°N 0.00531°W

Nelson's Ship in a Bottle is a sculpture by the British-Nigerian artist Yinka Shonibare. Commissioned in 2009 by the Greater London Authority, it was originally placed on the Fourth Plinth in London's Trafalgar Square in 2010.

It was subsequently relocated to a plinth outside the Sammy Ofer Wing of the National Maritime Museum in Greenwich, in southeast London, going on permanent display on 23 April 2012, two days before the museum's 75th anniversary. The work was purchased for £362,500 through a joint fund including a £50,000 contribution from the Art Fund and £264,300 from members of the public.

== Description and production ==
Made in 2010, the work depicts Admiral Nelson's ship HMS Victory, measures 280 cm × 250 cm × 500 cm (110 in × 98 in × 197 in), and weighs 4 tons. The piece is intricate and features 80 cannons and 37 sails.

== Cultural significance ==
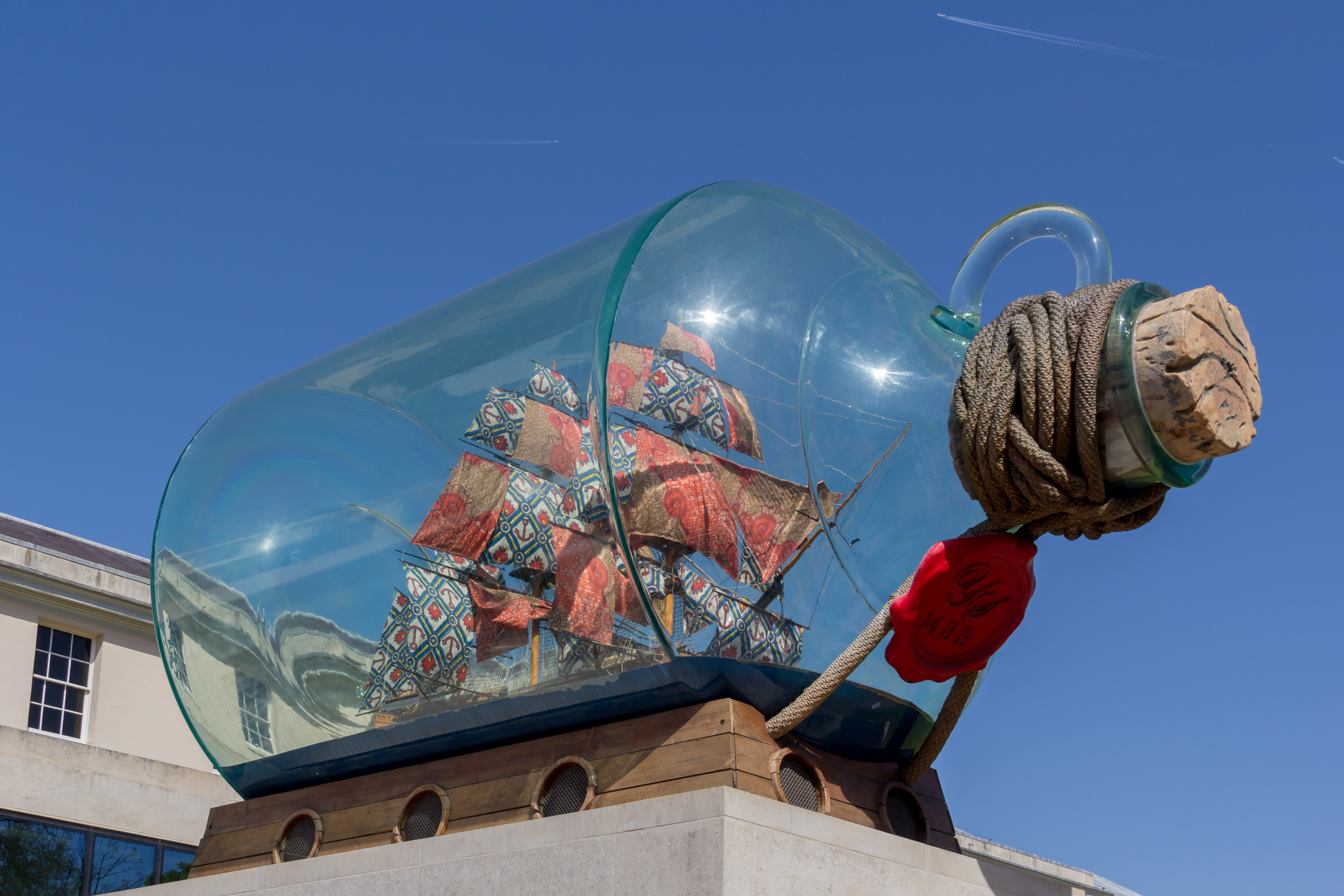
Nelson's Ship in a Bottle, on permanent display in Greenwich

According to the Royal Greenwich Museum, where it is now located, it is "one of the most photographed artworks in London". Its original location, in Trafalgar Square, was across from Nelson's Column, the monument built to honour Nelson's victory at the Battle of Trafalgar in 1805.

A noticeable departure from the original ship, HMS Victory, are the sails. The sails in the artwork are patterned with African wax prints, also known as Dutch wax prints, which are popular in Central and West Africa. These prints originate from the Indonesian batik tradition and were introduced to African markets by the Dutch during the colonial era. Despite this complex history of industrialization and cultural appropriation, these fabrics are now associated with African fashion and cultural identity. It is also thought to represent the diversity of London as a multicultural city, created by the European expansion. This reflects the history of the real vessel, which is thought to have had 22 nationalities represented in its crew, and illustrates the symbolism of England's diversity today. According to Shonibare, who is known for his parodic and satirical work:

"It's a celebration of London's immense ethnic wealth, giving expression to and honouring the many cultures and ethnicities that are still breathing precious wind into the sails of the United Kingdom."
