= Death of David Oluwale =

Nigerian homeless person drowned in suspicious circumstances

David Oluwale
- Date: April 1969
- Location: Leeds, West Riding of Yorkshire, England
- Cause: Drowning
- Burial: Killingbeck Cemetery, Leeds
- Accused: Inspector Geoffrey Ellerker; Sergeant Kenneth Kitching
- Charges: Manslaughter; Perjury; Grievous bodily harm (GBH); Assault occasioning actual bodily harm (ABH)
- Verdict: Both cleared of manslaughter, perjury and GBH by direction of the judge. Both found guilty of ABH.
- Convictions: Ellerker: Three years' imprisonment; Kitching: 27 months' imprisonment

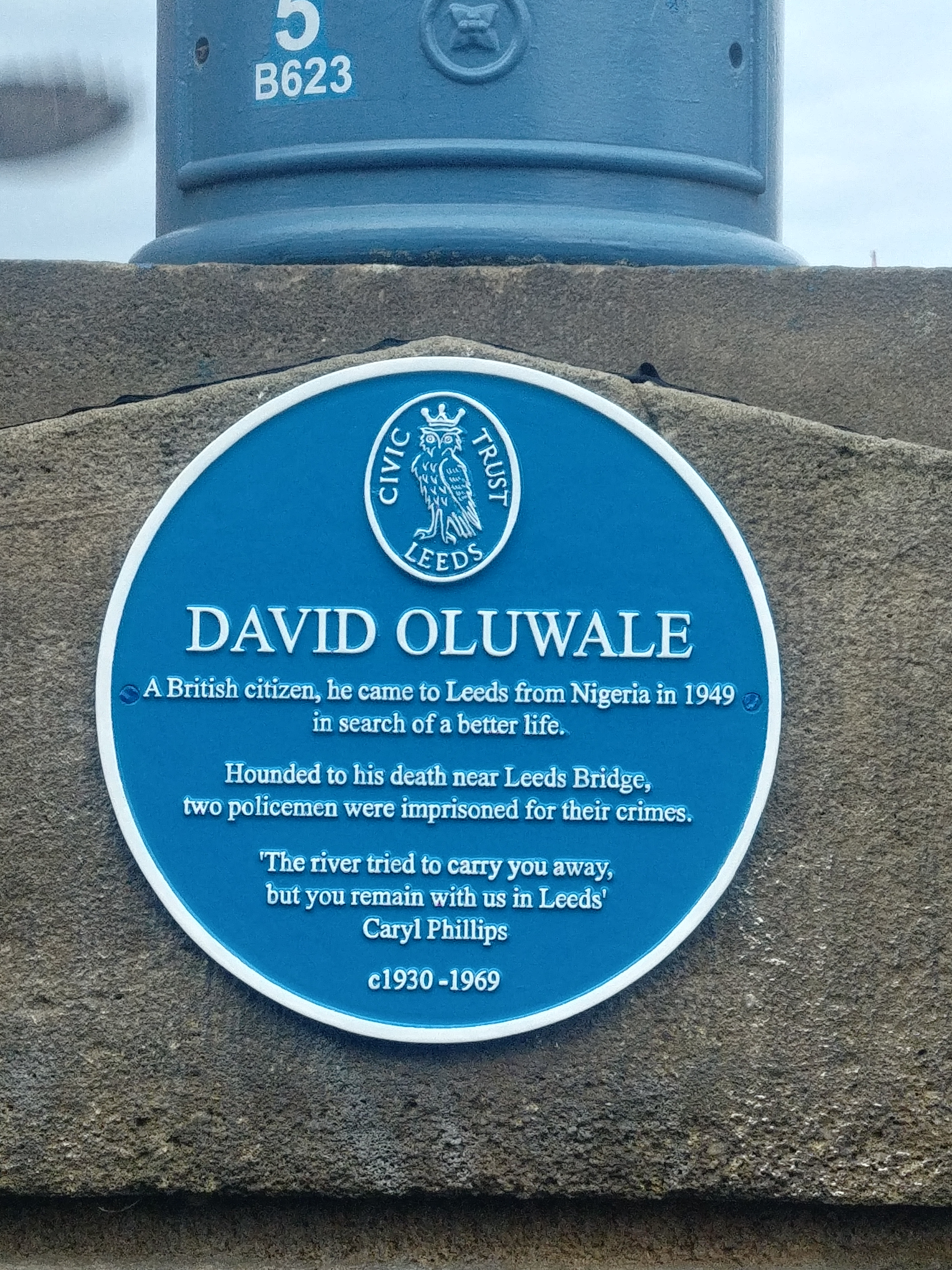
Blue plaque for David Oluwale (Leeds Civic Trust)

David Oluwale (1930–1969) was a British Nigerian who drowned in the River Aire in Leeds, West Riding of Yorkshire, in 1969. The circumstances surrounding his death have been described as "the physical and psychological destruction of a homeless Black man, whose brutal and systematic harassment was orchestrated by the Leeds City Police Force". His death resulted in the first successful prosecution of British police officers for involvement in the death of a Black person.

Oluwale's life, experiences, and death have had a lasting impact on public discourse concerning systemic racism within British legal institutions, police misconduct, social inequality, and mental health policy. He has been the subject of artworks, books, and documentaries, and is commemorated by a blue plaque in Leeds.

== Biography ==
David Oluwale was born in Lagos, Nigeria, around 1930. In August 1949, he stowed away on the SS Temple Bar, a cargo ship bound for Hull, England. When the ship docked in Hull on 3 September 1949, he was handed over to the authorities. Although, under the British Nationality Act 1948, Oluwale was considered a British subject rather than an illegal immigrant, he was charged as a stowaway under the Merchant Shipping Act 1894 (57 & 58 Vi. c. 60). He was sentenced to 28 days' imprisonment, which he served at Armley Gaol in Leeds and Northallerton Prison in Northallerton.

Following his release from prison on 3 October 1949, Oluwale—who had trained as a tailor in Nigeria—moved to Leeds, where there was a large textile and clothing industry.

In 1953, he was charged with disorderly conduct and assault after a dispute over a bill at the King Edward Hotel in Leeds city centre, and he served a further 28-day sentence. While in prison, he reportedly experienced hallucinations, possibly the result of a truncheon injury sustained during his arrest. He was subsequently transferred to Menston Asylum in Leeds (later known as High Royds Hospital, now closed), where he remained for the next eight years. During his time there, he was treated with a range of methods, including, allegedly, electroconvulsive therapy and medication, although the hospital records have since been lost.

After his release, Oluwale struggled to maintain both employment and stable housing, and soon became homeless. Friends described him as a shadow of his former self, noting that he had lost confidence. As a Black immigrant in 1960s Britain, his opportunities for accommodation and work were limited; the Race Relations Act 1968, which prohibited discrimination in these areas, did not receive royal assent until October of that year.

During this period, he moved between London and Sheffield but lived mainly in Leeds. He frequently came into contact with the Leeds police, whom he accused of harassment. In late 1965, he was readmitted to High Royds Hospital, where he spent a further two years. Following his release, he once again became homeless and lived on the streets.

== Death, repercussions, and aftermath ==
The precise circumstances leading to David Oluwale's entry into the River Aire—whether he was deliberately thrown, chased, or fell accidentally—have never been officially established. Two independent witnesses later testified that they had seen uniformed police officers pursuing a man, believed to have been Oluwale, near the river on the night he is thought to have drowned.

Oluwale's body was recovered from a stretch of the river between Knostrop Weir and Skelton Grange Power Station on 4 May 1969. At the time, his death was not treated as suspicious by either the police or the coroner. In October 1970, however, Police Cadet Gary Galvin disclosed that Oluwale had been subjected to persistent mistreatment by senior officers at Milgarth Police Station in Leeds. His report led to an investigation overseen by Chief Superintendent John Perkins of Scotland Yard. The inquiry concluded that Oluwale had endured "systemic, varied, and brutal" violence at the hands of at least two officers, often in the presence of colleagues who did not intervene.

=== Leeds City Police enquiry ===
Police records from 1968 indicate that Oluwale first came into recorded contact with Sergeant Kenneth Kitching and Inspector Geoffrey Ellerker in Leeds. Their actions were later alleged to have contributed to his death, although other officers were also implicated in his harassment.

Evidence presented during the inquiry and subsequent trial suggested that Kitching and Ellerker repeatedly assaulted Oluwale, often kicking him in the groin and, on one occasion, urinating on him. They were also reported to have forced him onto his hands and knees, kicking his arms away so that his head struck the pavement—a practice they referred to as "penance." The officers subjected him to verbal abuse, calling him a "lame darkie", and on several occasions transported him in police vehicles to the outskirts of Leeds, abandoning him in the early morning in an attempt to drive him out of the city. Despite this, Oluwale regularly returned, considering Leeds his home.

In the early hours of 17 April 1969, Kitching reportedly found Oluwale sleeping in a shop doorway and summoned Ellerker. Both men then assaulted him with their truncheons. The last sighting of Oluwale was of him fleeing from the officers towards the River Aire. His body was recovered two weeks later. He was buried in a pauper's grave, with no suspicious circumstances recorded in the official account at the time.

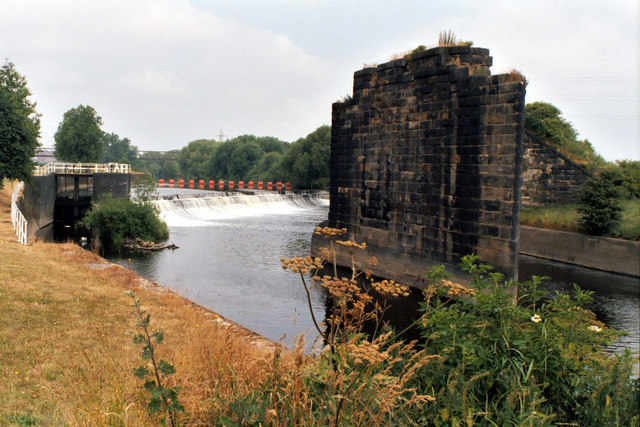
Knostrop Weir

=== Scotland Yard enquiry ===
In 1970, Police Cadet Gary Galvin reported that he had overheard colleagues discussing the severity of Kitching and Ellerker's treatment of Oluwale. This prompted a formal inquiry by Scotland Yard, which gathered sufficient evidence for charges of manslaughter, perjury, and grievous bodily harm (GBH) to be brought against both officers in 1971.

=== Manslaughter trial ===
In November 1971, former Inspector Geoffrey Ellerker—already serving a sentence for misconduct in an unrelated case—and Sergeant Kenneth Kitching stood trial for Oluwale's manslaughter. The trial received national attention but was criticised by justice and civil rights campaigners, who described it as a whitewash. The proceedings depicted Oluwale in negative terms, with descriptions of him as "a wild animal" and "a menace to society," while testimony favourable to him was omitted.

The judge, Mr. Justice Hinchcliffe, referred to Oluwale as "a dirty, filthy, violent vagrant" and directed the jury to acquit the defendants of manslaughter, perjury, and assault occasioning grievous bodily harm. The jury did, however, convict both men of assault in relation to incidents between August 1968 and February 1969. Ellerker received a three-year prison sentence, while Kitching was sentenced to 27 months.

The inquiry and trial established a pattern of physical abuse primarily by Kitching and Ellerker, who regularly sought out Oluwale during night patrols. Racist language was found in official documents relating to him, including the term "wog" entered in the nationality field. Despite such evidence, the trial did not directly address racism, focusing instead on police brutality. Several witnesses described Oluwale as dangerous, a portrayal echoed by the judge, in contrast to earlier testimony, such as that of Yorkshire Evening Post reporter Tony Harney, who had characterised him as quiet and cheerful. These accounts were not included in court.

Ultimately, the manslaughter charges were dismissed during the trial. Ellerker was convicted of three assaults and Kitching of two, but both were acquitted of causing GBH. Ellerker received a three-year sentence, while Kitching was sentenced to 27 months.

== Cultural legacy and memorials ==
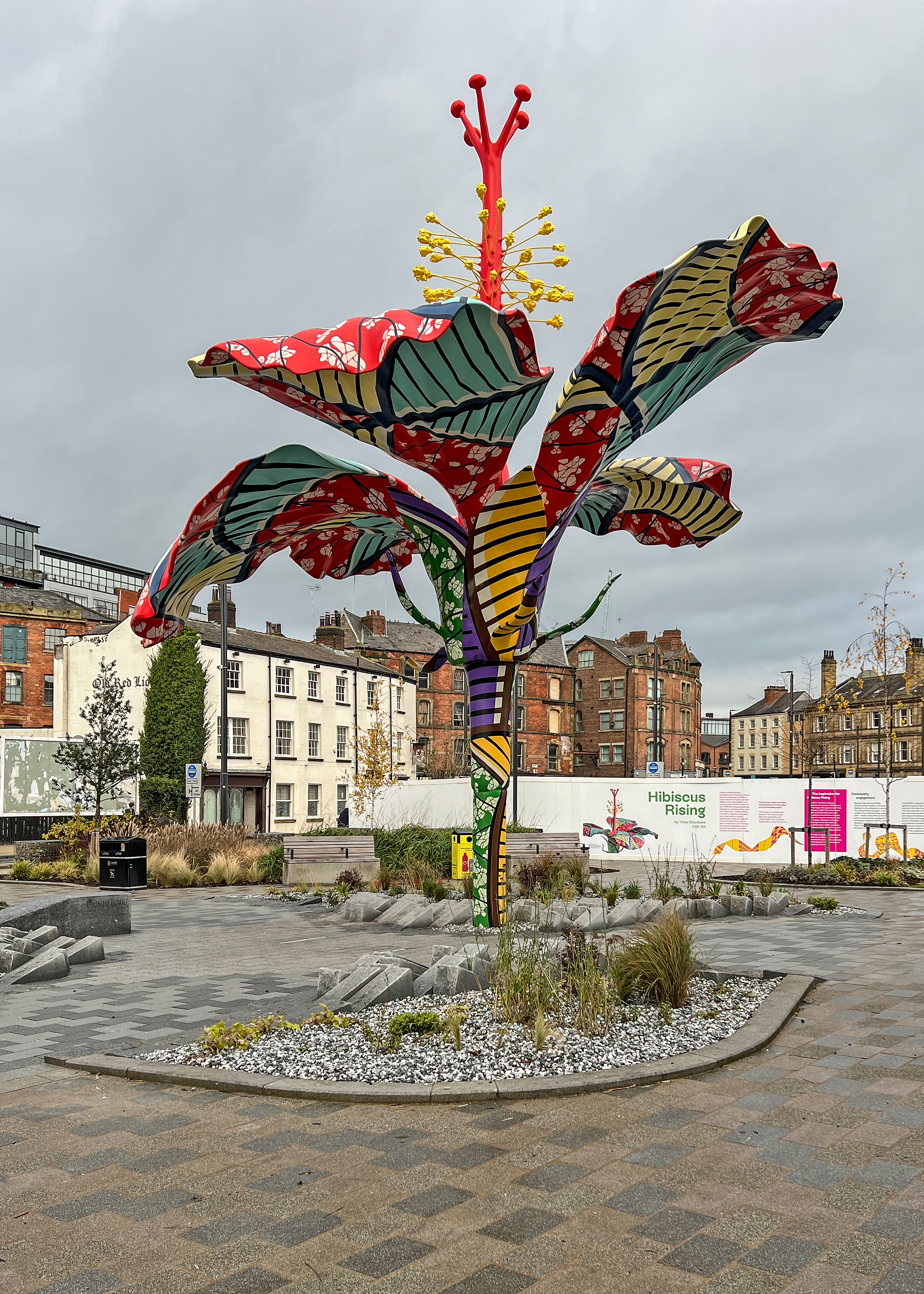
Hibiscus Rising by Yinka Shonibare (2023)

Caryl Philips unveiling a Leeds Civic Trust Blue Plaque to David Oluwale

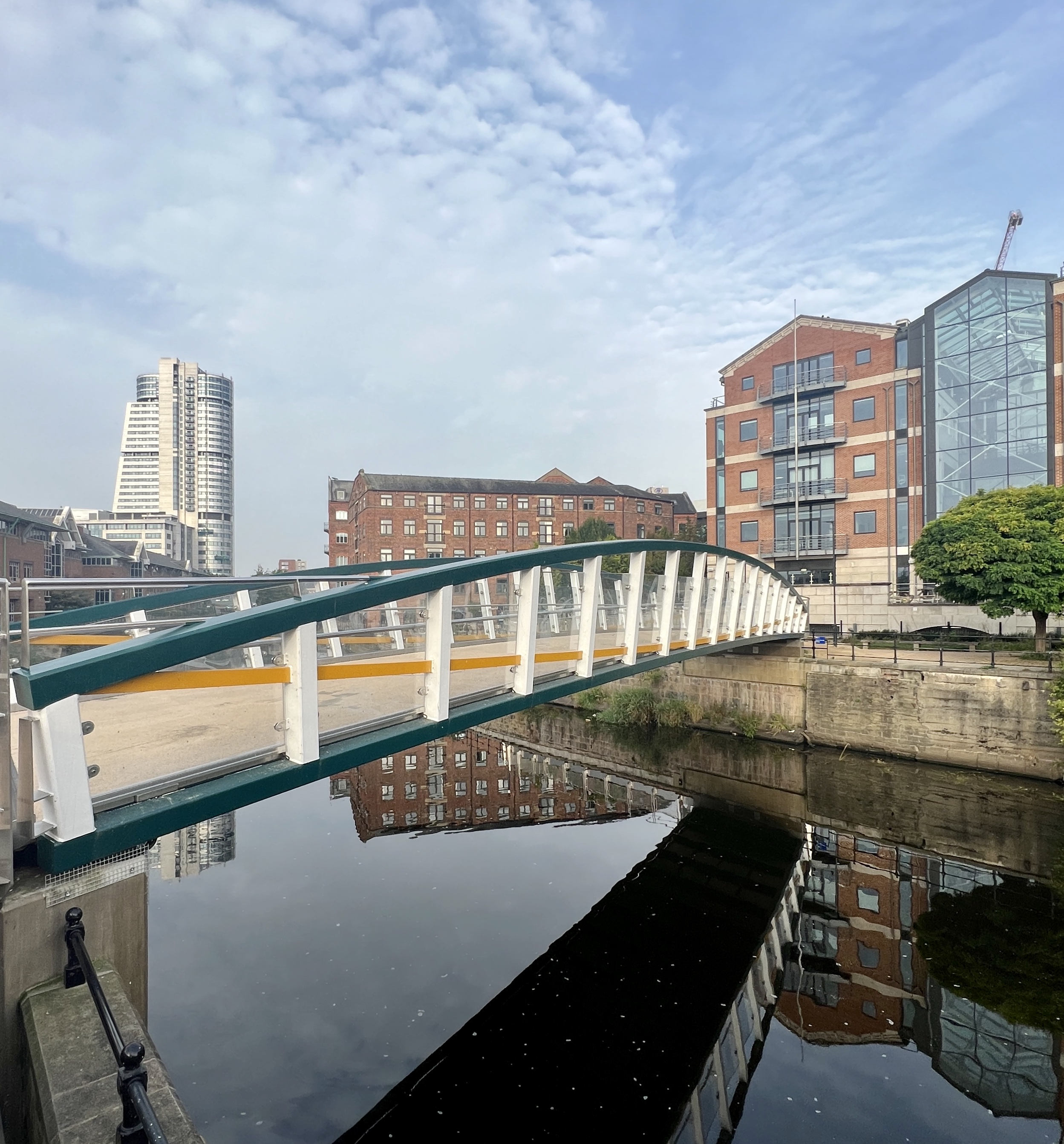
David Oluwale Bridge

=== Literature ===
David Oluwale's story caused a national scandal. In addition to extensive coverage of the trial of Ellerker and Kitching in local newspapers, national press also reported on the case. Ron Phillips published a detailed article on the case in the monthly journal Race Today in January 1972. This coverage prompted the London-based artist Rasheed Araeen to create his work For Oluwale between 1972 and 1975. The writer Jeremy Sandford's play Smiling David was broadcast by the BBC in 1972 and published in 1974. Poet Linton Kwesi Johnson referenced the Oluwale case in his 1972 poem Night of the Head and in Time Come, included in his 1979 album Forces of Victory. In 1985, Rasheed Araeen produced an updated version of his artwork For Oluwale (Max Farrar, 2018).

The story remained largely forgotten until police records were declassified under the thirty-year rule. These records were used by Kester Aspden to write Nationality: Wog, The Hounding of David Oluwale, published in 2007, which renewed public attention on his life and death.

In the same year, Caryl Phillips published Foreigners – Three English Lives, in which his third narrative focused on David Oluwale. At an event at Leeds Metropolitan University in 2008, Phillips suggested that a memorial to Oluwale should be established in the city. This led to the creation of a committee at the university, which became the charity David Oluwale Memorial Association (DOMA) in 2012.

In 2016, DOMA published the anthology Remembering Oluwale, featuring entries addressing issues that Oluwale experienced, including mental health distress, incarceration, police brutality, destitution, and homelessness, all linked to his status as a Black Nigerian migrant and British citizen. The anthology included work by Caryl Phillips, Kester Aspden, Ian Duhig, Linton Kwesi Johnson, Zodwa Nyoni, Sai Murray, and The Baggage Handlers.

=== Theatre ===
Aspden's book was adapted for the stage by Oladipo Agboluaje, with a premiere at the West Yorkshire Playhouse in February 2009. Critics described the production as "a richly emotional play which proves its point without coming across like it has a point to prove."

In 2018, the Strictly Arts Theatre staged Freeman at the Pleasance Theatre in London, a play addressing systemic racism in legal institutions and police brutality, with David Oluwale portrayed as one of the characters.

=== Exhibitions ===
Oluwale's story has also been explored in a film installation by Corinne Silva, entitled Wandering Abroad, which premiered at Leeds Art Gallery in 2009.

In 2019, DOMA organised events to mark the 50th anniversary of his death, including an exhibition at The Tetley, readings by Linton Kwesi Johnson and Jackie Kay, and a vigil at his grave in Killingbeck Cemetery. In September 2022, The Tetley hosted an exhibition of the maquette for Hibiscus Rising, a public sculpture by Yinka Shonibare commissioned by DOMA and LEEDS 2023.

=== Blue plaque ===
On 25 April 2022, a blue plaque commemorating Oluwale was unveiled on Leeds Bridge by Leeds Civic Trust and DOMA. The plaque was stolen later the same evening, prompting a West Yorkshire Police investigation, treated as a hate crime. The plaque was replaced but vandalised again that night, leading to the installation of a temporary replacement.

Following further incidents, including racist graffiti on the bridge and at civic trust offices, the blue plaque was reinstalled on 23 October 2022.

=== David Oluwale Bridge ===
In January 2023, Leeds City Council opened a new bridge over the River Aire, connecting Sovereign Street to Water Lane, named the David Oluwale Bridge.
