= Yinka Shonibare =

British artist (born 1962)

Yinka Shonibare CBE RA
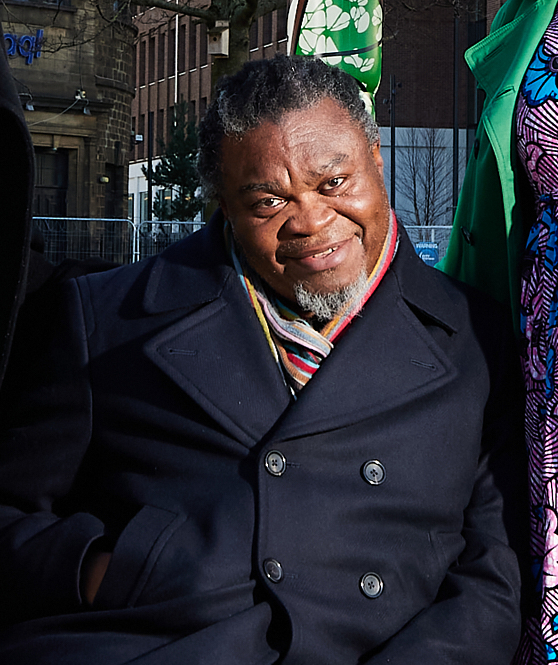
- Shonibare in 2024
- Born: 9 August 1962 (age 64); London, England
- Education: Byam Shaw School of Art; Goldsmiths, University of London
- Movement: Young British Artists (YBAs)
- Website: yinkashonibare.com

Yinka Shonibare (born 9 August 1962) is a British artist whose work explores cultural identity, colonialism and post-colonialism within the contemporary context of globalisation. A hallmark of his art is the brightly coloured Ankara/batik fabric he uses. As Shonibare is paralysed on one side of his body, he uses assistants to make works under his direction.

== Early life and education ==
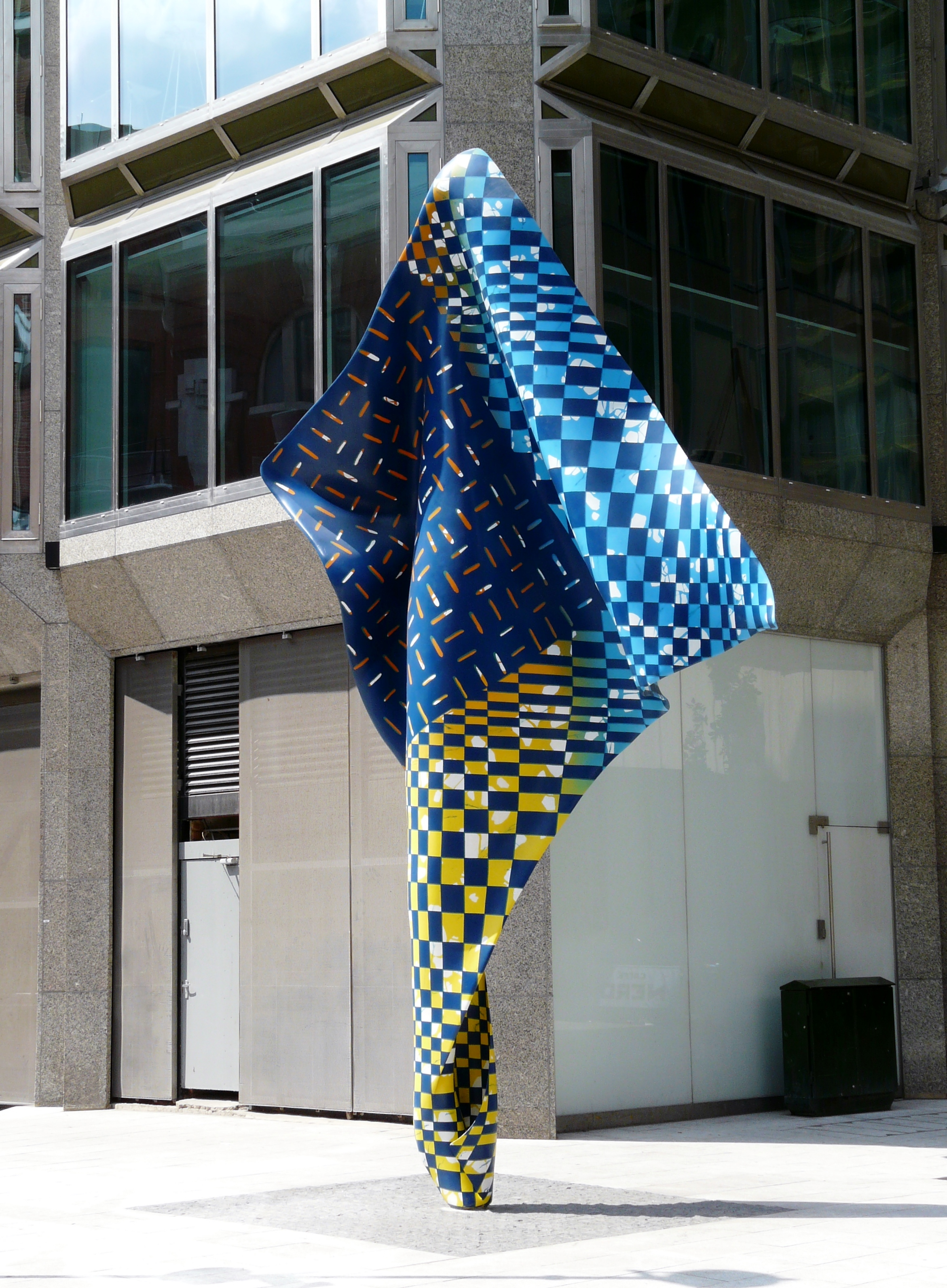
Wind Sculpture (London, 2014)

Yinka Shonibare was born in London, England on 9 August 1962, the son of Olatunji Shonibare and Laide Shonibare. When he was three years old, his family moved to Lagos, Nigeria, where his father practised law. They were a middle-class family, and maintained a home in London whilst in Nigeria, and would return in the summer holidays. When he was 17 years old, Shonibare returned to the UK to take his A-levels at Redrice School, an English boarding school in Andover, Hampshire. Shonibare's father wanted him to study law.

At the age of 18, whilst he was at Wimbledon School of Arts, Shonibare contracted transverse myelitis, an inflammation of the spinal cord, which resulted in a long-term physical disability where one side of his body is paralysed. He had to re-learn to do everyday tasks, such as walking and dressing himself, and to create art again.

Shonibare studied Fine Art first at Byam Shaw School of Art (now Central Saint Martins). In the late 1980s, Shonibare studied at Goldsmiths, University of London for his MFA degree, graduating as part of the Young British Artists generation. He described the critiques he received as part of his degree as brutal, which prepared him for facing critique of his work in the media later in his career.

Following his studies, Shonibare worked as an arts development officer for Shape Arts, an organisation that makes arts accessible to people with disabilities. It took him about six years from graduating to work with a commercial gallery, which he has said was due to racism within the commercial art world.

== Career ==
In 1997, Shonibare appeared in Sensation at the Royal Academy of Arts. After that, he started to be invited to other international exhibitions.

In 1999, Shonibare created four alien-like sculptures that he named Dysfunctional Family, the piece consisting of a mother and daughter, both coloured in textures of white and blue, and a father and son textured in the colours of red and yellow.

He has exhibited at the Venice Biennial and at leading museums worldwide. He was notably commissioned by Okwui Enwezor at documenta XI in 2002 to create his most recognised work, Gallantry and Criminal Conversation, which launched him on the international stage.

In 2004, he was shortlisted for the Turner Prize for his Double Dutch exhibition at the Museum Boijmans van Beuningen in Rotterdam and for his solo show at the Stephen Friedman Gallery, London. Of the four nominees, he seemed to be the most popular with the general public that year, with a BBC website poll resulting in 64 per cent of voters stating that his work was their favourite. However, he lost out to Jeremy Deller.

Shonibare became an Honorary Fellow of Goldsmiths' College in 2004, was awarded an MBE in 2004, received an Honorary Doctorate (Fine Artist) of the Royal College of Art in 2010 and was appointed a CBE in the 2019 New Year Honours. He was elected Royal Academician by the Royal Academy of Arts in 2013. He joined Iniva's Board of trustees in 2009. He has exhibited at the Venice Biennial and internationally at leading museums worldwide. In September 2008, his major mid-career survey commenced at the Museum of Contemporary Art, Sydney, and toured to the Brooklyn Museum, New York, in June 2009 and the National Museum of African Art of the Smithsonian Institution, Washington DC, in October 2009. In 2010, Nelson's Ship in a Bottle became his first public art commission on the Fourth Plinth in Trafalgar Square.

On 3 December 2016, one of Shonibare's Wind Sculpture pieces was installed in front of the Smithsonian's National Museum of African Art (NMAA) in Washington, DC. The painted fibreglass work, titled Wind Sculpture VII, is the first sculpture to be permanently installed outside the NMAA's entrance.

In 2019, Shonibare received an MBE and a CBE.

In 2022, Shonibare was named Artist of the Year by the Princess Estelle Cultural Foundation and commissioned to create Wind Sculpture in Bronze I for the Princess Estelle Sculpture Park in Stockholm, Sweden.

== Work ==
Shonibare's work explores issues of colonialism alongside those of race and class, through a range of media which include painting, sculpture, photography, installation art, and, more recently, film and performance. He examines, in particular, the construction of identity and tangled interrelationship between Africa and Europe and their respective economic and political histories. Shonibare's work explores cultural and historical relationships between Africa and Europe, including colonial and post-colonial relations and questions of cultural and national identity.

He is interested in the artists of the 18th and 19th centuries, particularly Hogarth because of his critique of the aristocracy and depiction of eccentric characters of the time. In 1999, he created a series of photographic works called A Diary of a Victorian Dandy, subverting the idea of the dandy (usually a white man) by photographing himself (a black African man) in his place, where black people would usually only depicted in positions of service at the time. The images were produced as around 40 posters on the London Underground, expanding the audience for the work and bring the work outside of the gallery.

While he often makes work inspired by his own life and experiences around him, Shonibare takes inspiration from around the world; as he has said: "I'm a citizen of the world, I watch television so I make work about these things."

A key material in Shonibare's work since 1994 is the brightly coloured batik fabric (African wax-printed cotton) that he buys himself from Nasseri Fabrics LTD, a shop in Brixton, London. He started using them because he was expected to make "authentic" work about being African, which he found absurd. However, these fabrics, he says, "prove to have a crossbred cultural background quite of their own. And it's the fallacy of that signification that I like. It's the way I view culture – it's an artificial construct." Shonibare claims that the fabrics were first manufactured in Europe, by the British and Dutch, inspired by Indonesian textiles. They were made to sell in Indonesian markets and were then sold in Africa after being rejected in Indonesia. Today, the main exporters of "African" fabric from Europe are based in Manchester in the UK and Vlisco Véritable Hollandais from Helmond in the Netherlands. Despite being a European invention, the Dutch wax fabric is used by many Africans in England, such as Shonibare. He has these fabrics made up into European 18th-century dresses, covering sculptures of alien figures or stretched onto canvases and thickly painted over.

Shonibare is well known for creating headless, life-size sculptural figures meticulously positioned and dressed in vibrant wax cloth patterns in order for history and racial identity to be made complex and difficult to read. In his 2003 artwork Scramble for Africa, Shonibare reconstructs the Berlin Conference of 1884–1885, when European leaders negotiated and arbitrarily divided the continent in order to claim African territories. By exploring colonialism, particularly in this tableaux piece, the purpose of the headless figurines implies the loss of humanity as Shonibare explains: "I wanted to represent these European leaders as mindless in their hunger for what the Belgian King Leopold II called 'a slice of this magnificent African cake.'" Scramble for Africa cannot be read as a "simple satire", but rather it reveals "the relationship between the artist and the work". It is also an examination of how history tends to repeat itself. Shonibare states: "When I was making it I was really thinking about American imperialism and the need in the West for resources such as oil and how this pre-empts the annexation of different parts of the world."

Shonibare's Trumpet Boy, a permanent acquisition displayed at The Foundling Museum, demonstrates the colourful fabric used in his works. The sculpture was created to fit the theme of "found", reflecting on the museum's heritage, through combining new and existing work with found objects kept for their significance.

He also recreates the paintings of famous artists using headless mannequins with Batik or Ankara textiles instead of European fabrics. He uses these fabrics when depicting European art and fashion to portray a "culture clash" and a theme of cultural interaction within postcolonialism. Examples of Shonibare's recreations are Gainsborough's Mr and Mrs Andrews Without Their Heads (1998) and 2005's Reverend on Ice (after The Rev Robert Walker Skating on Duddingston Loch by Raeburn).

One artist whom Shonibare references in multiple works is Jean Honoré Fragonard. He recreated Fragonard's series The Progress of Love (1771–1773), which included his works The Meeting, The Pursuit, The Love Letter, and The Swing. A unique inclusion within these recreations, was the inclusion of branded fabric. The Swing (After Fragonard) (2001) has the woman on the swing wearing an imitation or "knock-off" Chanel patterned fabric. The use of this fabric was meant to further explore the themes of post-colonialism, globalism, and cultural interaction that are present throughout much of his work, while also commenting on the consumerism and consumer culture of the modern world and how all of these themes intersect.

Shonibare also takes carefully posed photographs and videos recreating famous British paintings or stories from literature but with himself taking centre stage as an alternative, black British dandy – for example, A Rake's Progress by Hogarth, which Shonibare translates into Diary of A Victorian Dandy (1998), or his Dorian Gray (2001), named after Oscar Wilde's 1890 novel The Picture of Dorian Gray. Dorian Gray deals with the transformation of the body, and drew on Shonibare's experience of disability.

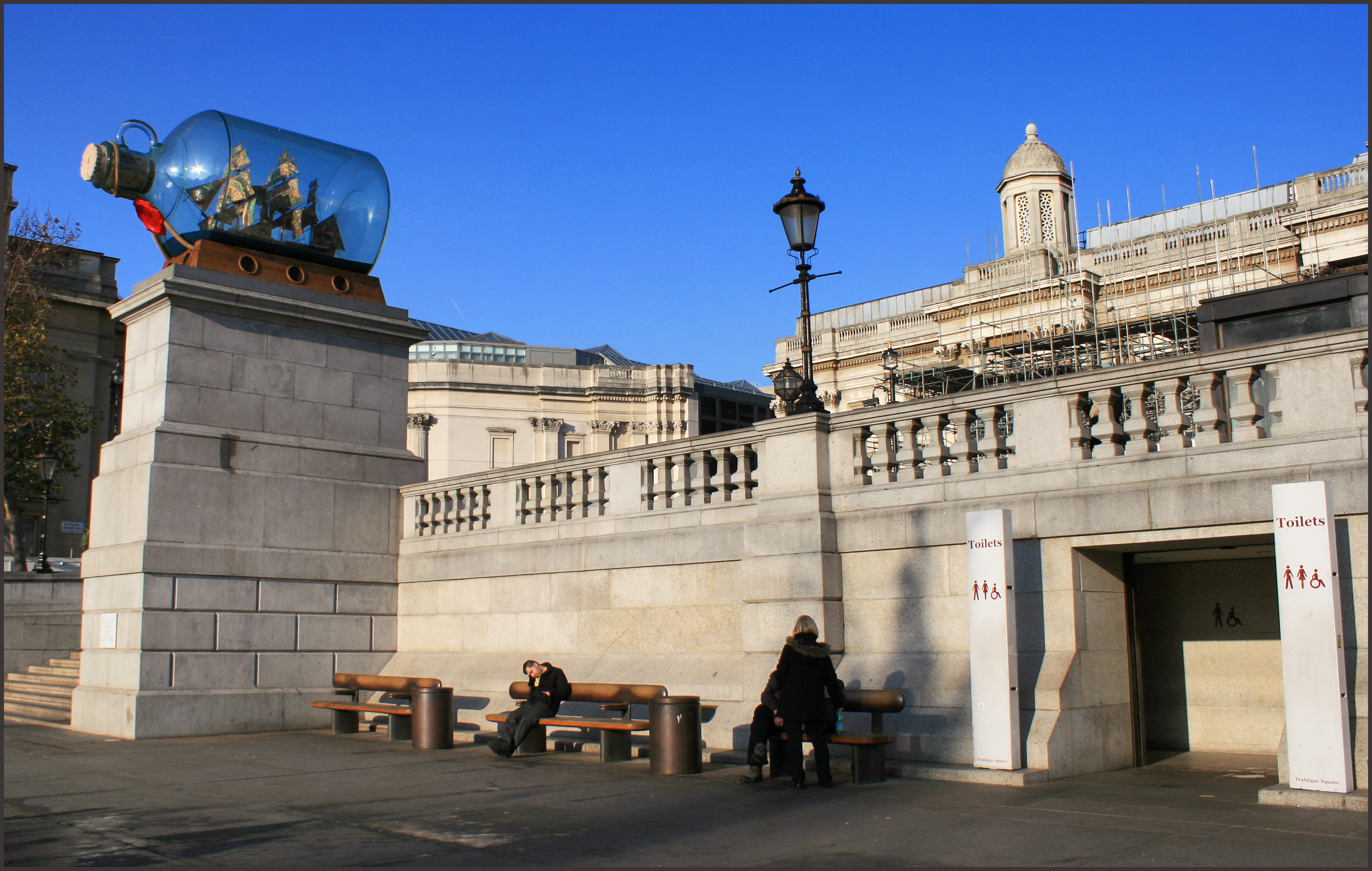
Nelson's Ship in a Bottle (London, 2010) by Yinka Shonibare during its occupancy of the Fourth Plinth in Trafalgar Square

Considerably larger than a usual ship in a bottle, yet much smaller than the real HMS Victory, in fact a 1:30-scale model, Shonibare's Nelson's Ship in a Bottle, was "the first commission on the Fourth Plinth to reflect specifically on the historical symbolism of Trafalgar Square, which commemorates the Battle of Trafalgar, and will link directly with Nelson's column." The work was placed there on 24 May 2010 and remained until 30 January 2012, being widely admired. In 2011, the Art Fund launched a campaign and successfully raised money for the purchase and relocation of the sculpture to the National Maritime Museum in Greenwich, where it found its new permanent home.

Other works include printed ceramics, and cloth-covered shoes, upholstery, walls and bowls.

In October 2013, Shonibare took part in Art Wars at the Saatchi Gallery curated by Ben Moore. The artist was issued with a stormtrooper helmet, which he transformed into a work of art. Proceeds went to the Missing Tom Fund, set up by Ben Moore to find his brother Tom, who has been missing for more than 10 years. The work was also shown on the Regent's Park platform as part of Art Below Regents Park.

The Goodman Gallery announced in 2018 that the Norval Foundation, South Africa's newest art museum based in Cape Town, has made a permanent acquisition of Shonibare's Wind Sculpture (SG) III, making it a first for the African continent. The sculpture will be unveiled in February 2019, increasing the British-Nigerian artist's visibility on the continent where he grew up.

Shonibare has collaborated with Bellerby & Co, Globemakers.

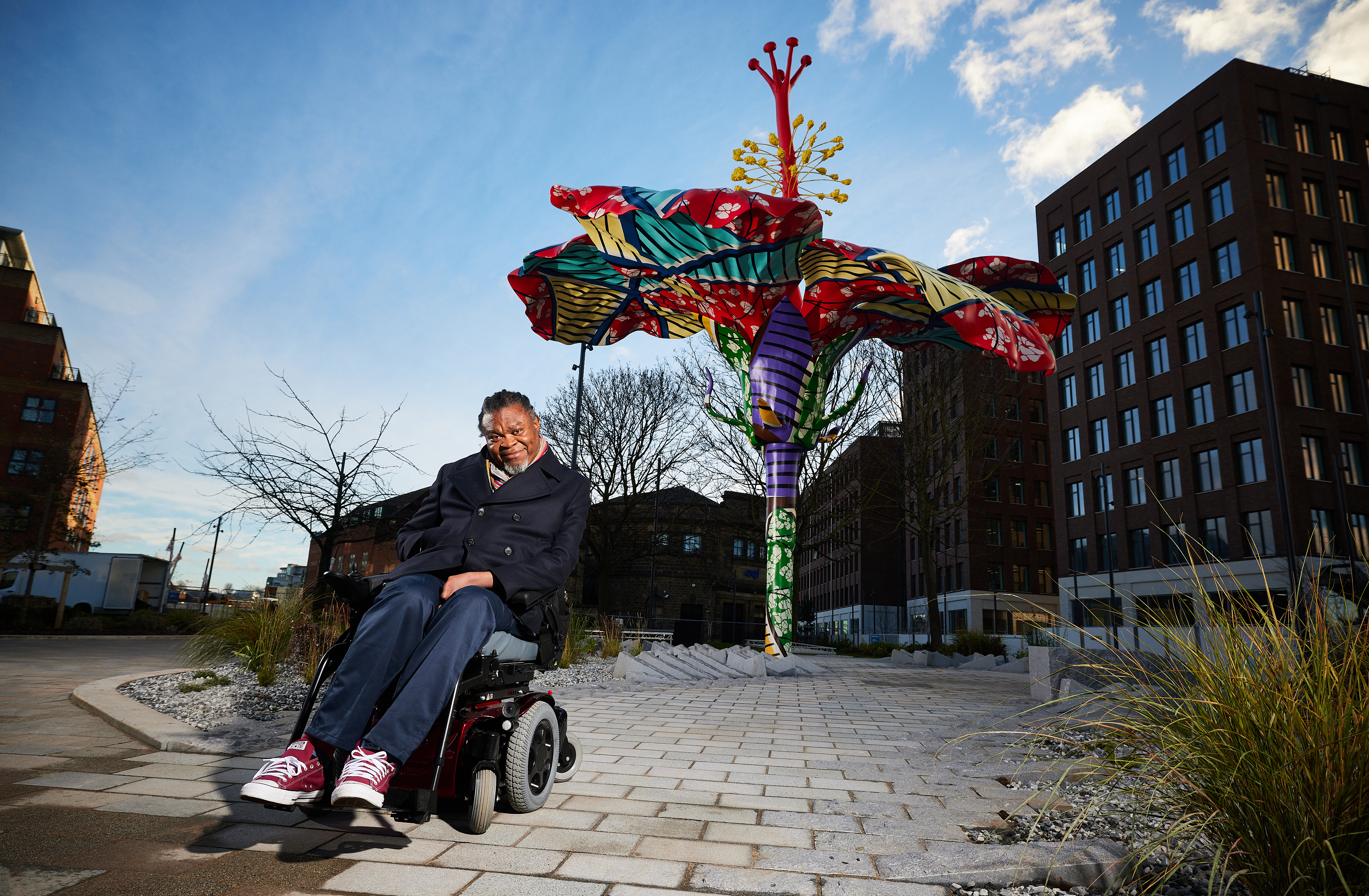
Shonibare with Hibiscus Rising sculpture, Leeds (2023)

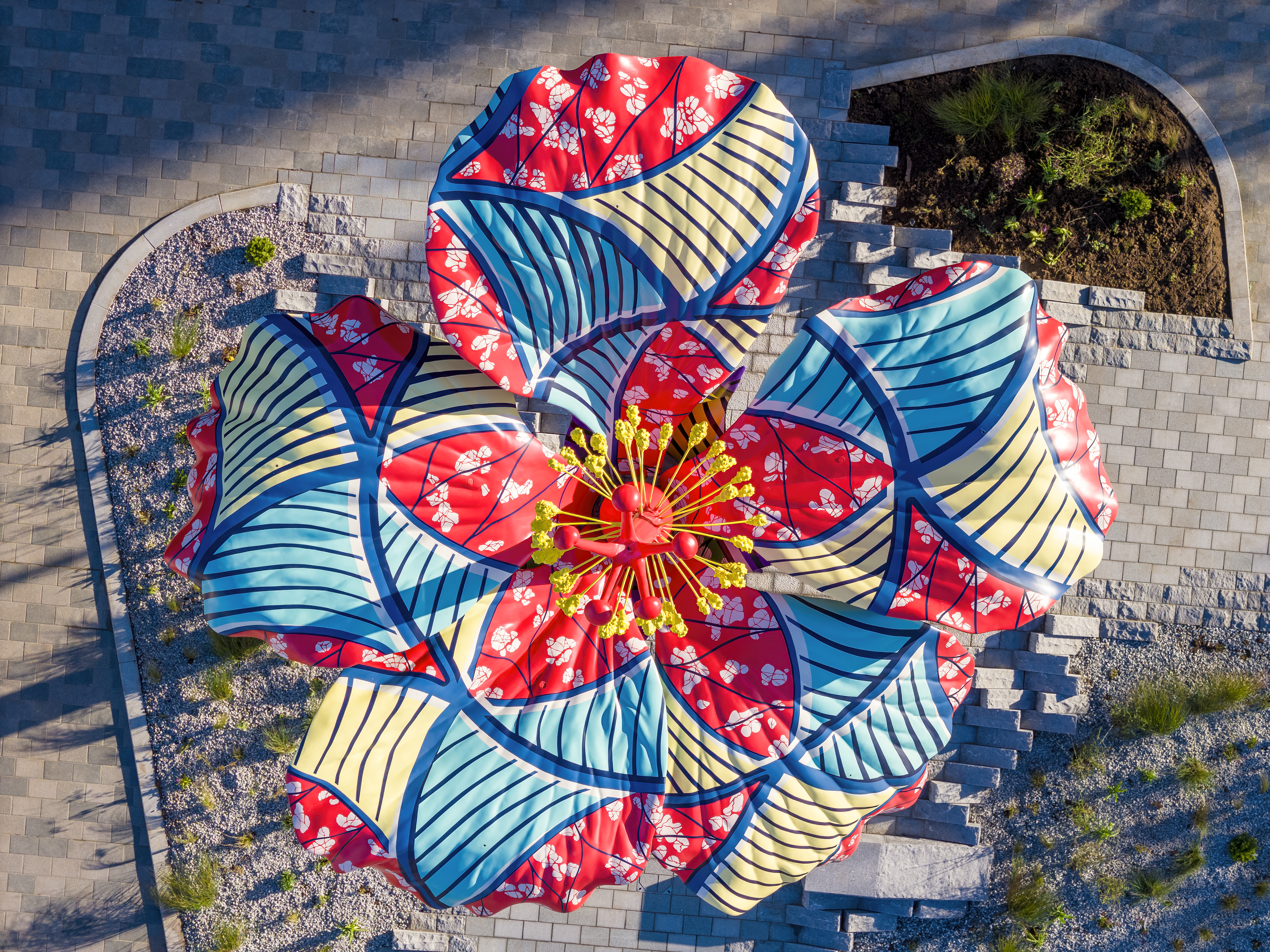
Hibiscus Rising see from above

In 2023, his first work of public art was unveiled in Leeds. Entitled Hibiscus Rising, it commemorates the life and death of David Oluwale, a Nigerian homeless man persecuted by Leeds City Police.

On 24 June 2025, it was announced that Foster + Partners were chosen to design national memorial to Queen Elizabeth II in St James' Park; Shonibare is part of the team along with landscape designer, Michel Desvigne.

== Guest Projects ==
He runs Guest Projects, a project space for emerging artists based in Broadway Market, east London. He is extending this to spaces in Lagos, Nigeria.

== Yinka Shonibare Foundation ==
Shonibare founded the Yinka Shonibare Foundation aims to support international and local artists. He says he "wanted to created spaces for other outsiders like myself". The foundation has offices in London and Nigeria. The foundation built a house for artists in Lagos, and a farmhouse for artists three hours outside of the city which provides a residency programme. They also have a farm, which supports the community, allowing local people to grow their own food. He believes artists should have some impact socially.

== Selected artworks/exhibitions ==
Shonibare's first solo exhibition was in 1989 at Byam Shaw Gallery, London. During 2008–09, he was the subject of a major mid-career survey in both Australia and the USA; starting in September 2008 at the Museum of Contemporary Art Australia (MCA), Sydney, and toured to the Brooklyn Museum, New York, in June 2009 and the Museum of African Art at the Smithsonian Institution, Washington DC, in October 2009. For the 2009 Brooklyn Museum exhibition, he created a site-specific installation titled Mother and Father Worked Hard So I Can Play which was on view in several of the museum's period rooms. Another site-specific installation, Party Time—Re-Imagine America: A Centennial Commission was simultaneously on view at the Newark Museum of Art in Newark, New Jersey, from 1 July 2009, to 3 January 2010, in the dining-room of the museum's 1885 Ballantine House.

== Other activities ==
- Zeitz Museum of Contemporary Art Africa, Member of the Global Council

== Awards ==
- In 2004, Shonibare was granted the title Member of the Order of the British Empire (MBE). He ironically incorporates the title into his official artistic identity, as he states that it is "better to make an impact from within rather than from without... it's the notion of the Trojan horse... you go in unnoticed. And then you wreak havoc."
- In 2019, Yinka Shonibare was awarded and decorated with the Commander of the Order of the British Empire (CBE).
- Shonibare received the Whitechapel Gallery Art Icon Award in March 2021. He is the eighth recipient of this award, which celebrates artists who have made significant contributions to a particular medium.

== Disability ==
Shonibare is a disabled artist. He relies on a team of assistants to fabricate his work, operating himself as a conceptual artist and/or designing the works. He also works himself digitally, which is more accessible for him.

Shonibare's disability has increased with age. Until he was 50, he was able to walk, but now uses an electric wheelchair to prevent falls. In later life, Shonibare has discussed his disability and its role within his work as a creative artist.

In 2013, Shonibare was announced as patron of the annual Shape Arts "Open" exhibition, where disabled and non-disabled artists are invited to submit work in response to an Open theme.

== Personal life ==
Shonibare's brother is a surgeon, his elder brother is a banker and his sister is a dentist.

Shonibare previously was in a relationship with Max, who was doing a doctorate degree in expanded cinema. Shonibare is currently in a relationship with partner, Rachel.
