= Lottorf =

Lottorf Lottorp
- Municipality
- Coat of arms

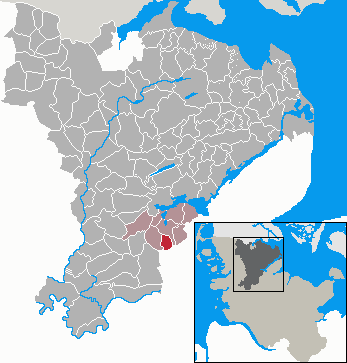
- Location of Lottorf; Lottorp within Schleswig-Flensburg district
- Interactive map of Lottorf; Lottorp
- Location within Germany Location within Schleswig-Holstein
- Coordinates: 54°27′N 9°34′E
- Country: Germany
- State: Schleswig-Holstein
- District: Schleswig-Flensburg
- Municipal assoc.: Haddeby

Government
  - Mayor: Manfred Hatwig

Area
  - Total: 5.78 km^{2} (2.23 sq mi)
- Elevation: 20 m (66 ft)

Population (2025-12-31)
  - Total: 233
  - Density: 40.3/km^{2} (104/sq mi)
- Time zone: UTC+01:00 (CET)
  - Summer (DST): UTC+02:00 (CEST)
- Postal codes: 24878
- Dialling codes: 04621
- Vehicle registration: SL
- Website: www.haddeby.de

Lottorf (Danish: Lottorp) is a municipality in the district of Schleswig-Flensburg, in Schleswig-Holstein, Germany.
