= Joshua Tetley =

Brewer

- Born: 20 July 1778; Armley, West Riding of Yorkshire
- Died: 26 August 1859 (age 81); Leeds, West Riding of Yorkshire
- Resting place: Hampsthwaite, North Yorkshire
- Occupation: Brewer
- Known for: the founding of the Tetley's Brewery in 1822
- Partner: Hannah Carbutt

Joshua Tetley (20 July 1778 – 26 August 1859) was the founder of the Tetley's Brewery in Leeds, England. The brewery was founded in 1822 and Joshua Tetley bought the brewery for £400. In 1839, Tetley made his son a partner of the business. It is a common misconception that the former Tetley's huntsman logo was a depiction of Tetley.

== Early life and dynasty ==
Tetley was born into a middle-class family of maltsters from the West Yorkshire village of Birkenshaw. His grandfather, William Tetley had formed a successful maltster's business in Armley, (a village close to Leeds). The business became a success and William, became wine and beer merchants in Leeds city centre. Joshua Tetley was the third of four brothers, Isaac, William and James. His elder brother William died aged two.

== The family business under Tetley's father ==
The Tetley business expanded under Tetley's father until 1801 when Tetley's business became bankrupt. When the bankruptcy was filed Tetley's had customers in Yorkshire, Lancashire, Cheshire and Surrey. By 1803, Tetley's father was back in business, as a Leeds-based agent for the Imperial Fire Insurance Office of London, an agency which kept running until 1857.

== Joshua enters the business ==
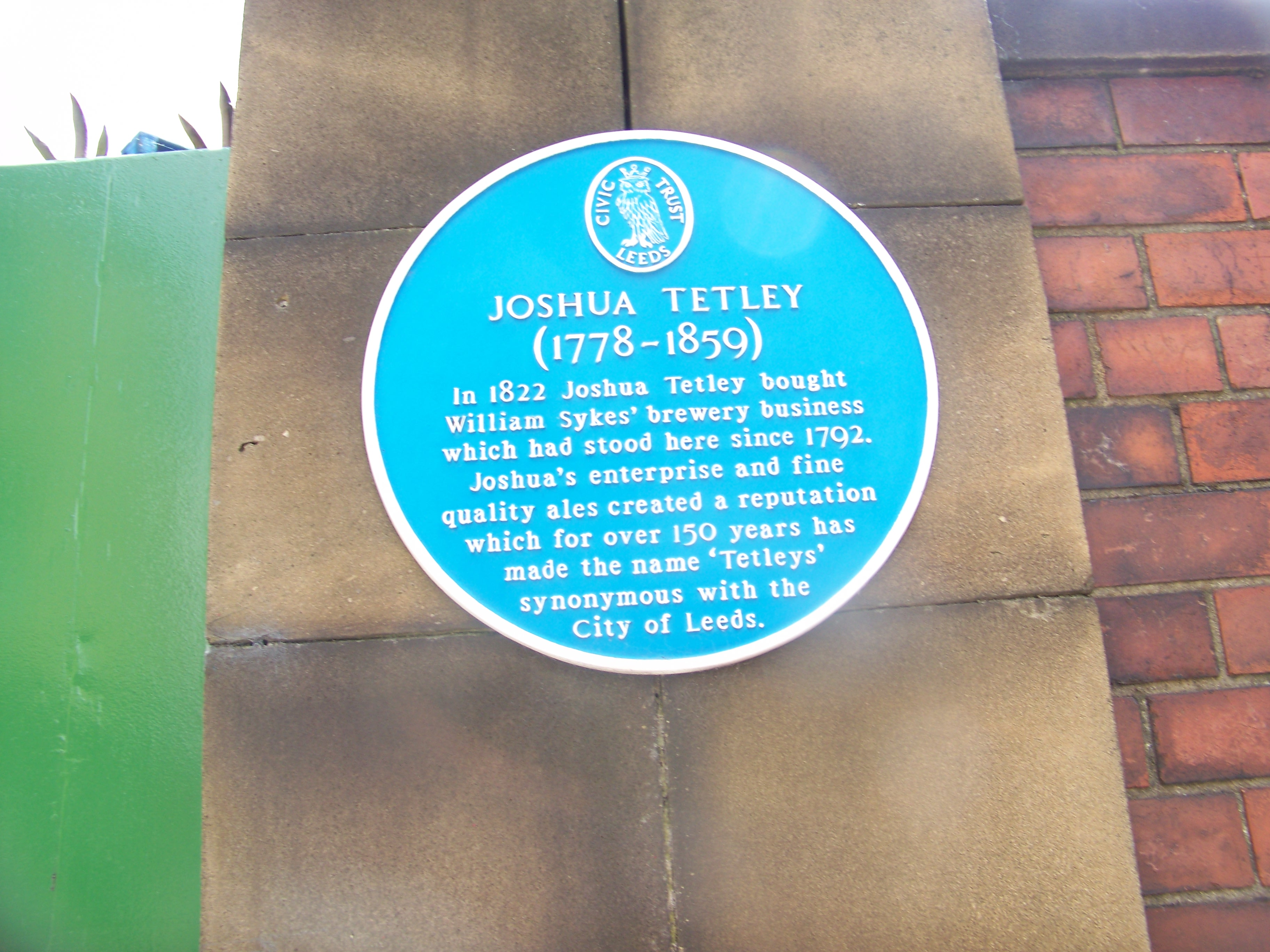
A blue plaque detailing his life at the Tetley's brewery in Leeds.

Aged 29, Tetley married Hannah Carbutt on 12 March 1808 at Sheffield Parish Church. Carbutt was from an affluent family which included former Mayors of York and Leeds. They settled in a house on Park Square in Leeds. In 1822, aged 44, Tetley leased William Sykes' Brewery in Salem Place, Hunslet. Unusually for the time, Tetley head hunted staff, looking only for the most skilled brewers and maltsters from as far away as Manchester. Once the brewery was established it became the second largest in Leeds and had an estimated value of £22, while Robert Arthington's brewery held an estimated value of £100. Following the passing of the Beerhouse Act 1830, Tetley's business grew and his recently acquired ale houses opened between 4 am and 10 pm. The temperance movement approved beer as a temperate alternative to spirits, which led to the growth of many small breweries. When Tetley's father William Tetley died in 1834, Joshua received (according to William's 1820 will) £450 worth of his assets, much of which was invested in the Tetley business.

== Death ==
Tetley died in 1859, aged 81, and was buried in Hampsthwaite, North Yorkshire, beside his wife, who he survived by two years.
