= Aire Park =

Park in West Yorkshire, England

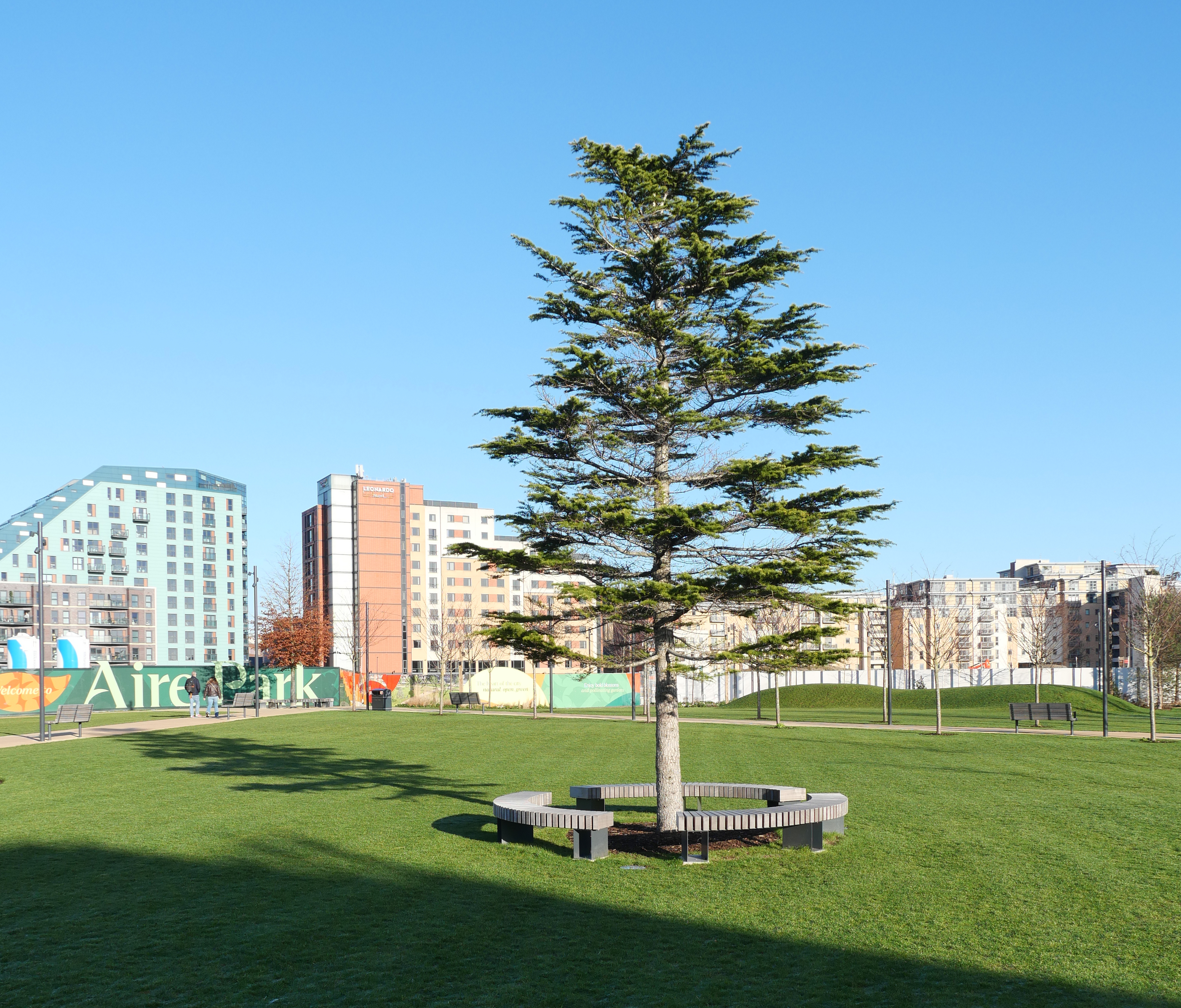
- Centre of the park, facing The Tetley and further construction in 2025

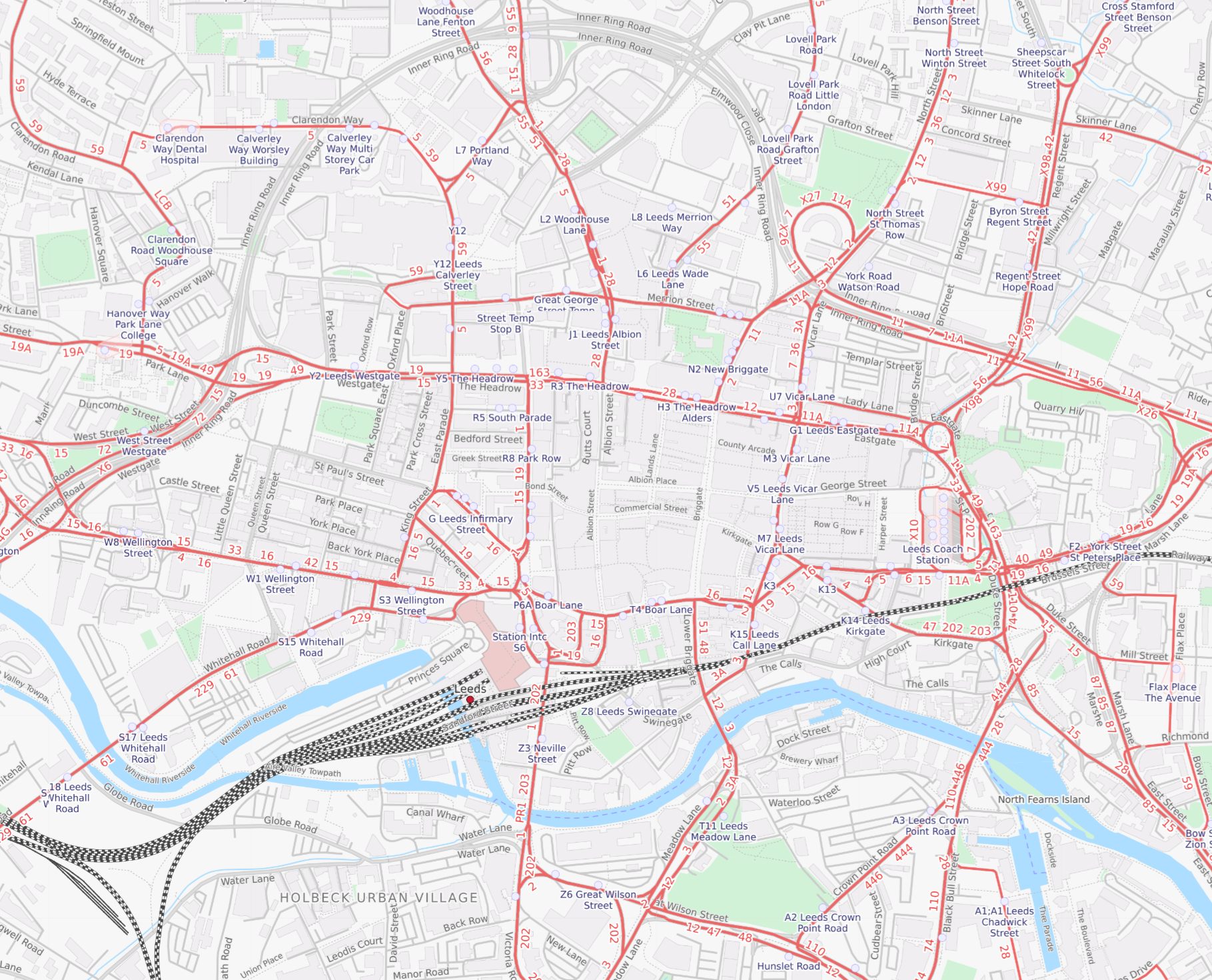
- Location within Leeds
- Location: Leeds, West Yorkshire, England
- Coordinates: 53°47′31″N 1°32′23″W
- Area: Hunslet
- Status: Under construction public park
- Website: airepark.co.uk

Aire Park is a 24 acres (9.7 ha) public park and mixed-use development in Hunslet, south of the city centre of Leeds, West Yorkshire, England. It is being developed by the international real estate organisation Vastint, and will mostly occupy the abandoned brownfield site of the former Tetley's Brewery. It is part of the Leeds South Bank development and is named after the River Aire, which flows nearby.

As well as 8 acres (3.2 ha) of parkland, the development includes 1,400 new homes and almost 1 million sqft of commercial space. It will retain the Art Deco former brewery headquarters turned contemporary art gallery The Tetley, and Salem Chapel.

== History ==
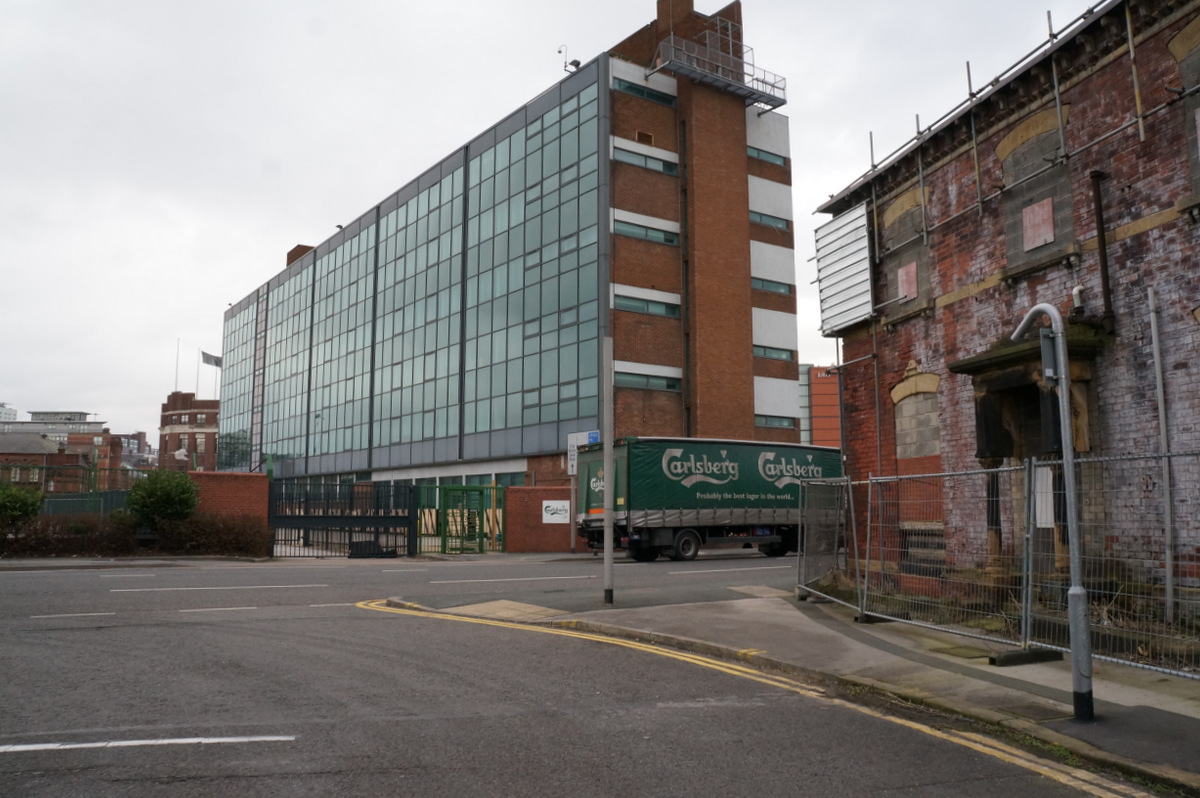
Buildings to be demolished

Hunslet is now an inner-city area of Leeds immediately south of Leeds railway station, bounded on the north and east by the River Aire. It was a rural village until rapid growth during the 19th century as a result of the Industrial Revolution. The area between Meadow Lane and Crown Point Road became the brewery of Joshua Tetley and Son in 1822, which was replaced by the construction of a new brewery designed by George Corson began in 1852. By 1860 Tetley was the largest brewery in the North of England, and in 1931, the Art Deco Tetley headquarters building was erected. Tetley's was fully taken over by Carlsberg in 1998, which had owned 50% since 1993, who announced the brewery's closure in 2008, with the final brew taking place in 2011 and lager production transferring to Northampton.

After demolition of most of the brewery buildings except the office blocks, the brewery site has remained under-utilised. It is partly vacant, partly in temporary use as surface car parking and greenspace, and since 2013 has been home to a contemporary art gallery and art hub in the redeveloped 1930s headquarters building.

The site was bought by Vastint, a commercial real estate company related to IKEA which specialises in large-scale mixed-use schemes. An outline planning application submitted by Vastint was approved in principle by Leeds City Council's City Plans Panel in October 2017, which provided for a phased development of up to 850 residential units, business and hotel uses, and a city park with a minimum of 2 hectares (4.9 acres) of public realm.

After initially being known as the "city park" pending choice of a permanent name, Vastint announced in September 2019 that the green space will be called Aire Park. The reserved matters application will be considered by Plans Panel on 3 September 2020.

== Features ==
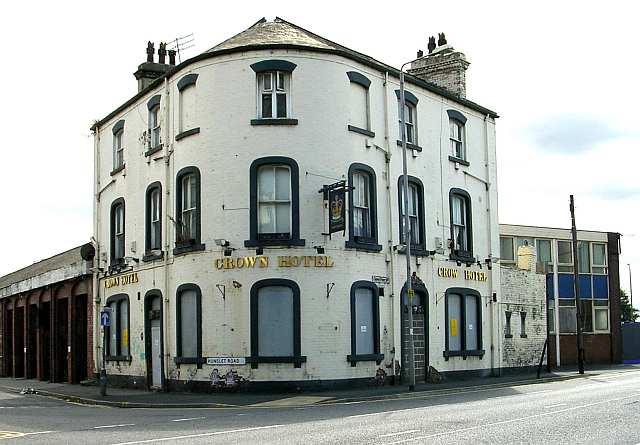
The Crown Hotel, Crown Point Road

The park is promoted as a bustling and open district revitalising a forgotten part of the city, effectively extending the city centre southwards. Andrew Cobden, managing director of Vastint UK, said: "The South Bank has been really fragmented over the years. We feel we have a real opportunity to connect parts of the city back together." As well as a 400-bed hotel and other architectural developments, 500 trees are planned to be planted. The park area will be divided into 5 character areas:

1. The Tetley Triangle — Event Space to the north-west of the Tetley – hard surfaced event space for concerts, markets, outdoor cinema, outdoor café space, approximately the size of half the paved area of Millennium Square
2. The Tetley Triangle — The Green – to the west of the Tetley - grassed and stepped amphitheatre for informal performance and sitting, a similar size to Merrion Street Gardens
3. Theatre Gardens — north of Salem Chapel - modern ornamental and sensory garden for quiet enjoyment
4. The Central Park — east of the Tetley to Crown Point Road - including significant parkland including grassed areas and trees, water feature, play area and grassed mound
5. Link Ways — greened communal connectors between new building plots with wide pathways, trees, planting, and benches

As part of a regeneration masterplan for the whole South Bank of Leeds, Aire Park will be integrated with improvements to the surrounding area, particularly by extending the greenspace across City Council owned land to a new footbridge over the River Aire linking to Sovereign Street and Leeds station.

Additionally, plans have been submitted to reopen the derelict Crown Hotel on Crown Point Road as a pub and restaurant space, which has been closed since the early 1990s, and to include a memorial to David Oluwale, a British Nigerian who drowned in the River Aire in 1969. In 2022 work started on a new bridge over the river, crossing from Sovereign Street to Water Lane, to be known as the David Oluwale Bridge.
