= Hunslet =

Area of Leeds, West Yorkshire, England

Coordinates: 53.7779°N 1.5305°W

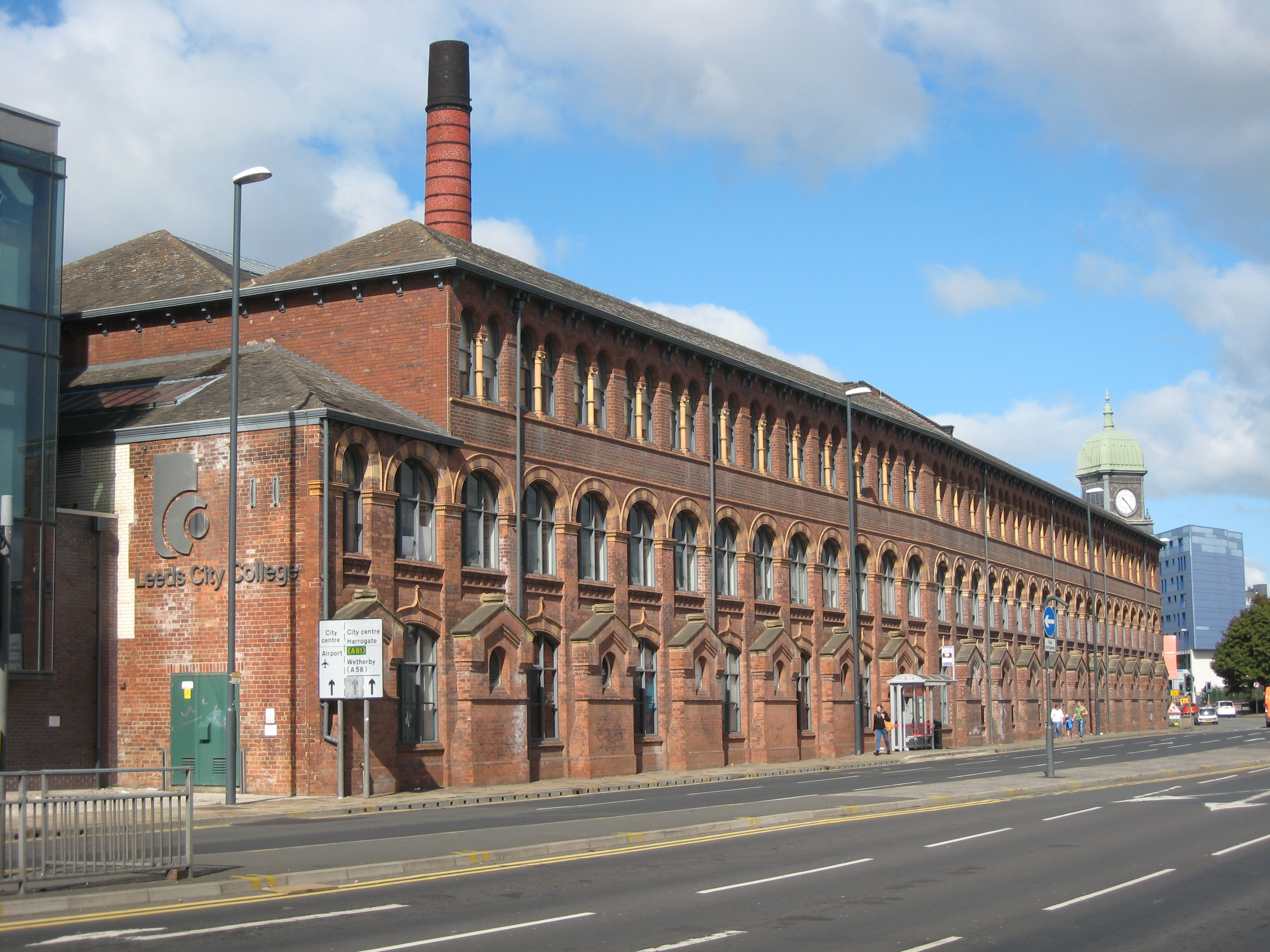
- Former Printworks, now part of Leeds City College

- Location within West Yorkshire
- Population: 33,705 (City and Hunslet Ward. 2011)
- OS grid reference: SE311314
- Metropolitan borough: City of Leeds
- Metropolitan county: West Yorkshire
- Region: Yorkshire and the Humber
- Country: England
- Sovereign state: United Kingdom
- Post town: LEEDS
- Postcode district: LS10
- Dialling code: 0113
- Police: West Yorkshire
- Fire: West Yorkshire
- Ambulance: Yorkshire
- UK Parliament: Leeds South

Hunslet (English: /ˈhʌnzlət/) is an inner-city area in south Leeds, West Yorkshire, England. It is 1 mile (1.6 km) southeast of the city centre and has an industrial past.

It is situated in the Hunslet and Riverside ward of Leeds City Council and Leeds South parliamentary constituency. The population of the previous City and Hunslet council ward at the 2011 census was 33,705.

Many engineering companies were based in Hunslet, including John Fowler & Co. manufacturers of traction engines and steam rollers, the Hunslet Engine Company builders of locomotives (including those used during the construction of the Channel Tunnel), Kitson & Co., Manning Wardle and Hudswell Clarke. Many railway locomotives were built in the Jack Lane area of Hunslet.

The area has a mixture of modern and 19th century industrial buildings, terraced housing and 20th century housing. It is an area that has grown up significantly around the River Aire in the early years of the 21st century, especially with the construction of modern riverside flats. It was at one point the main production site for Leeds Creamware, a type of pottery (still produced) so called because of its cream glazing. Hunslet is now prospering as it follows the trend of Leeds generally and the expansion of office and industrial sites south of Leeds city centre.

== Etymology ==
Hunslet is first mentioned as Hunslet (sic, for *Hunsflet) in the Domesday Book of 1086, though twelfth-century spellings of the name such as Hunesflete seem to be more conservative: the name appears originally to have meant 'Hūn's creek', from an Anglo-Saxon personal name Hūn (or Hūna) and the Old English word flēot 'creek, inlet', probably referring to an inlet from the River Aire (> -fleet : Adlingfleet, Adelingesfluet 1086; Marfleet, Merefluet 1086; Ousefleet, Useflete 1100–1108). There are also the Old Norse personal names Húnn (Old Danish Hun) and Húni, cognates of Hūn(a). The district of Hunslet Carr, whose name is first attested in the period 1175–89 as Kerra, includes the northern English dialect word carr, meaning 'bog' (borrowed into English from Old Norse kjarr, which had the same meaning, but more commonly "copsewood", "brushwood", "thicket"). Meanwhile, Hunslet moor is first mentioned in 1588.

Notice : Hunslet is possibly related etymologically to the place-name Honfleur in Normandy, which is probably of Anglo-Scandinavian origin and mentioned as Huneflet in 1025, Hunefleth in 1082 - 87.

== History ==
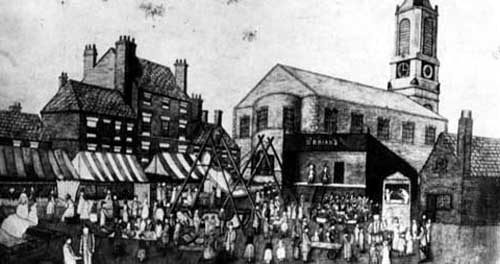
The Hunslet Feast in 1850

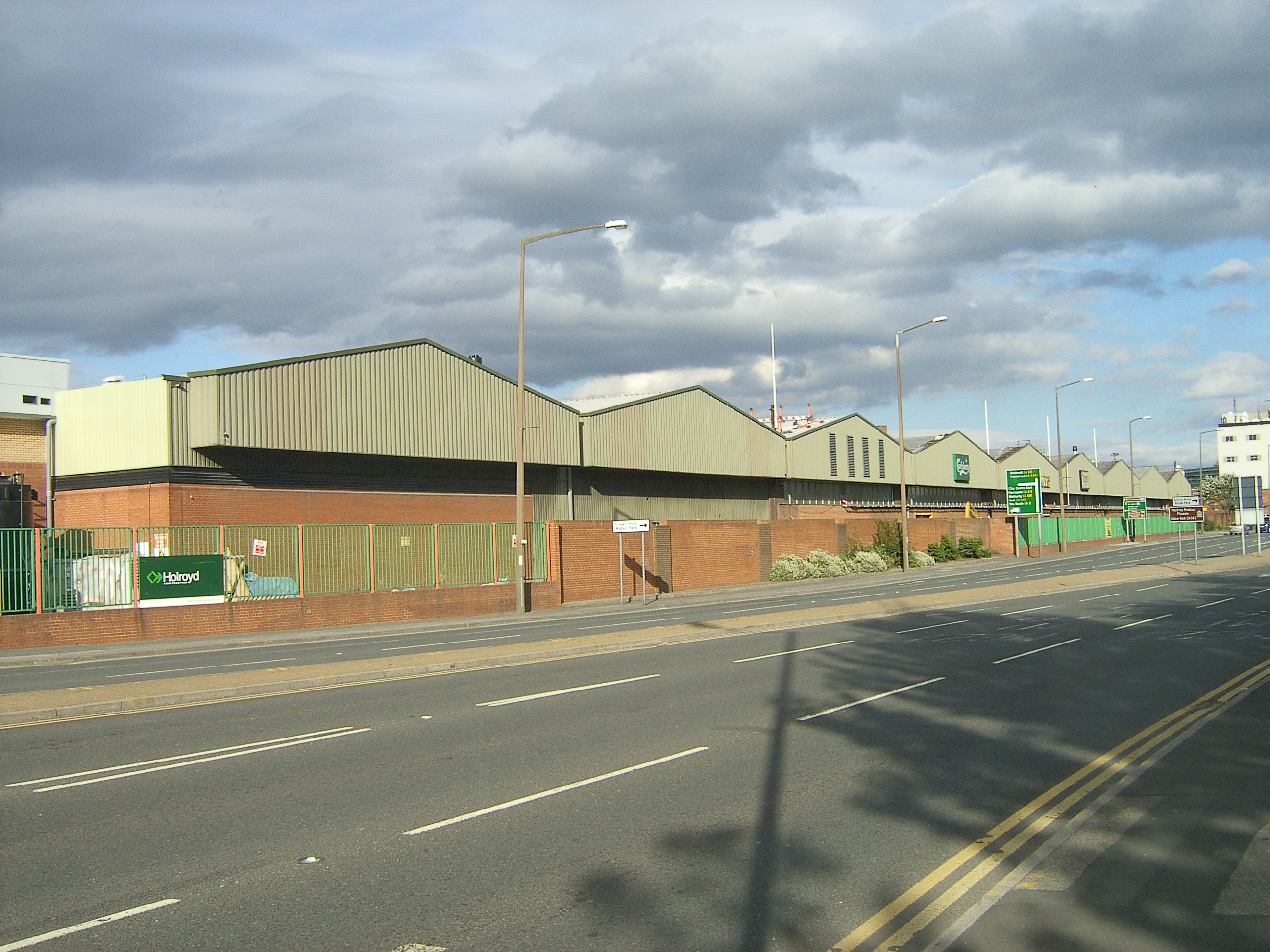
The former Tetley's Brewery in the Crown Point area of Hunslet, Leeds

At the time of the Domesday survey in 1086, the manor of Hunslet belonged to the Lacys, from whom it passed to various families including the Gascoignes and the Neviles. Hunslet was the birthplace of Thomas Gascoigne, born in 1404 and later chancellor of Oxford University.

The brewers Joshua Tetley and Son set up business in Hunslet in 1822 producing beer and bitter today as part of Carlsberg Tetley group. However, in 2011 the brewery closed.

In 1823 forty working men from Hunslet raised the sum of £1 5s 1d which they sent to the radical publisher Richard Carlile who was serving a prison sentence in Dorchester gaol for the publications in which he exposed the reactionary policies of the government of Lord Liverpool. The subscription was accompanied by a noble letter written by one of the contributors, William Tillotson.

The population of Hunslet grew rapidly in the first half of the 19th century becoming an important manufacturing centre. Several large mills were built for spinning of flax including Hunslet Mill, and there were chemical works, works for the manufacture of crown and flint glass, extensive potteries for coarse earthenware and the Leeds Pottery. Hunslet Mill, created between 1832 and 1842, is a Grade II listed building.

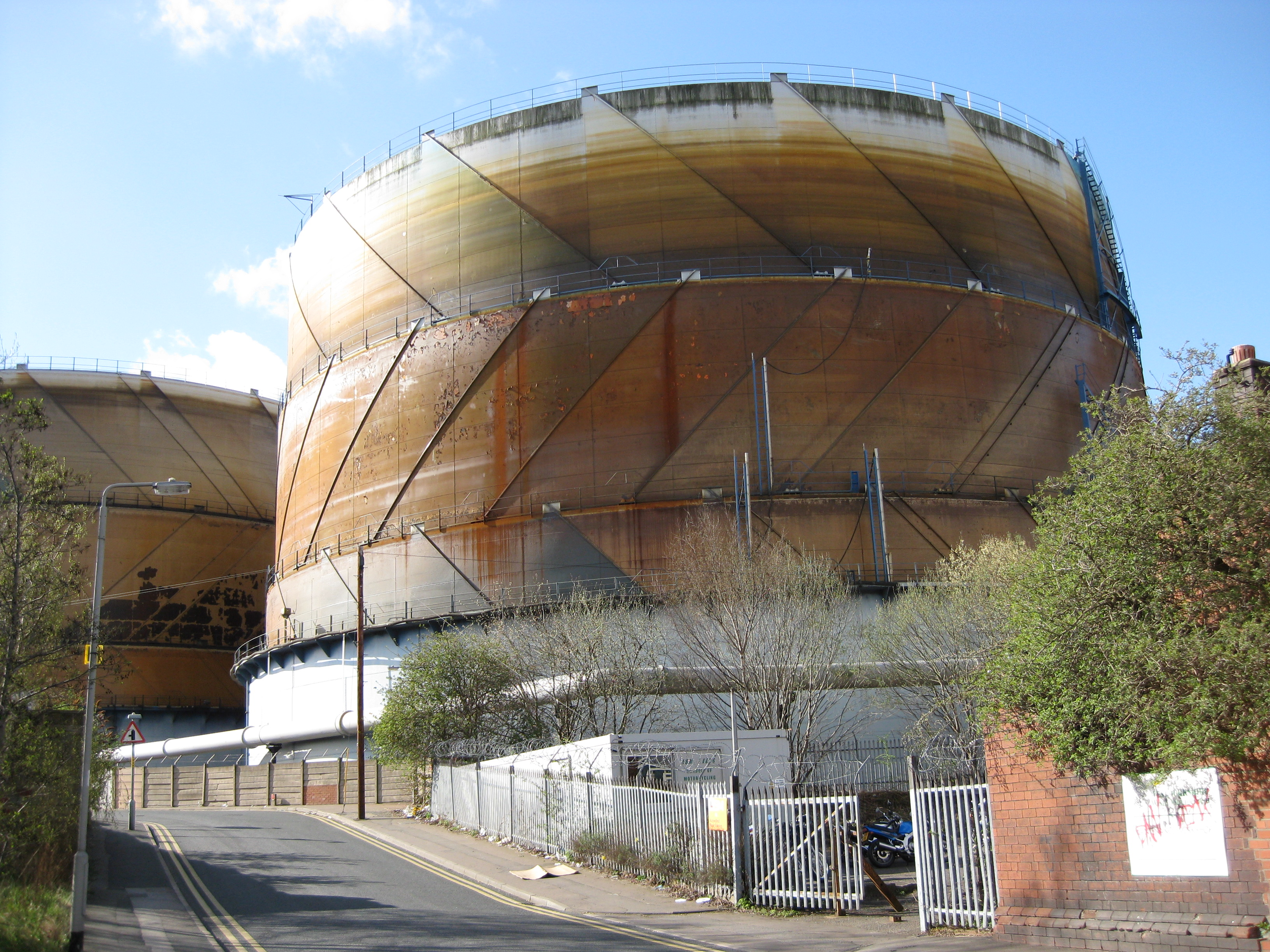
The gasholders at the Meadow Lane Gas Works

From 1898 to 1935 it was the home of the 25 acres (10 ha) Leeds Steel Works, with four blast furnaces, which was the site of a major industrial accident in 1913, when a boiler explosion killed nine men. Thirteen years earlier, four men had died in a very similar explosion. By 1906 Hunslet was home to Leeds’ second-largest gas works, the city's main rail goods yards, known at the time as Midland Goods Station (now the site of Crown Point Retail Park), as well as a large number of factories.

Hunslet was home to the first free public library in Leeds when a branch library opened on evenings from October 1870 in a room at the Hunslet Mechanics Institute. It became a day branch in 1912. On 23 February 1931, the new building was opened by Arthur Greenwood MP and Minister for Health. The fixtures and fittings in the interior of the library, with an adult and junior reading room, were designed by Thomas Horsman and Co Ltd, costing £1,049 17s 6d. The building is now Hunslet Library and Community Hub.

Crown Point once had a large railway depot which contained Leeds' main goods station. After many decades lying derelict the area was redeveloped into the Crown Point Retail Park, though the main railway cutting into the terminus station can still be seen at the southern end. The former track beds are currently let for storage and contain timber and brickwork. Tetley's Brewery was to the north of this area, as was the Yorkshire Chemical Works: both have now been demolished. Next to the river is Clarence Dock.

Pottery Fields is the industrial area around Kidacre Street, Leathley Road, Ivory Street, Meadow Lane and Cross Myrtle Street where Leeds City Council's Pottery Fields Depot and the former Meadow Lane Gas Works are situated. Pottery Fields House, has the administrative and engineering functions for Northern Gas Networks. Other businesses include Merlin Gerin medium voltage electrical supplies, a scrap yard and Volkswagen auto breakers, and a motorcycle training centre. There are several disused railways crossing the roads, which brought coal from Middleton Colliery to the Meadow Lane Gas Works for the production of town gas, before conversion to North Sea natural gas.

Penny Hill surrounds Church Street. This is the old centre of Hunslet referred to as Hunslet Grange when the Leek Street Flats (1968 to 1983) were built. The Leek Street Flats developed problems with crime and condensation and were demolished fifteen years after their construction.

The area was redeveloped in the 1960s, the main feature of this being the Hunslet Grange (Leek Street flats). In the 1980s it was again redeveloped, and in the 2000s, the area around the River Aire and Clarence Dock was redeveloped.

In the 2020s, Hunslet is part of the Leeds South Bank development.

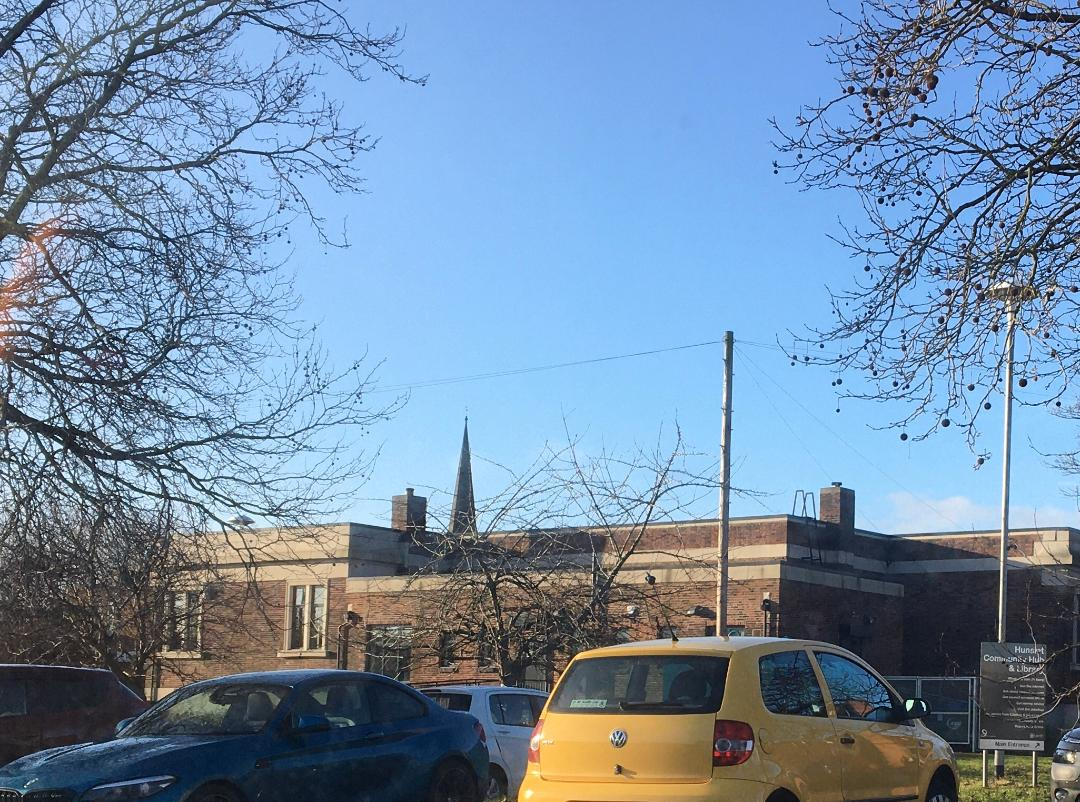
Hunslet Community Hub and Library

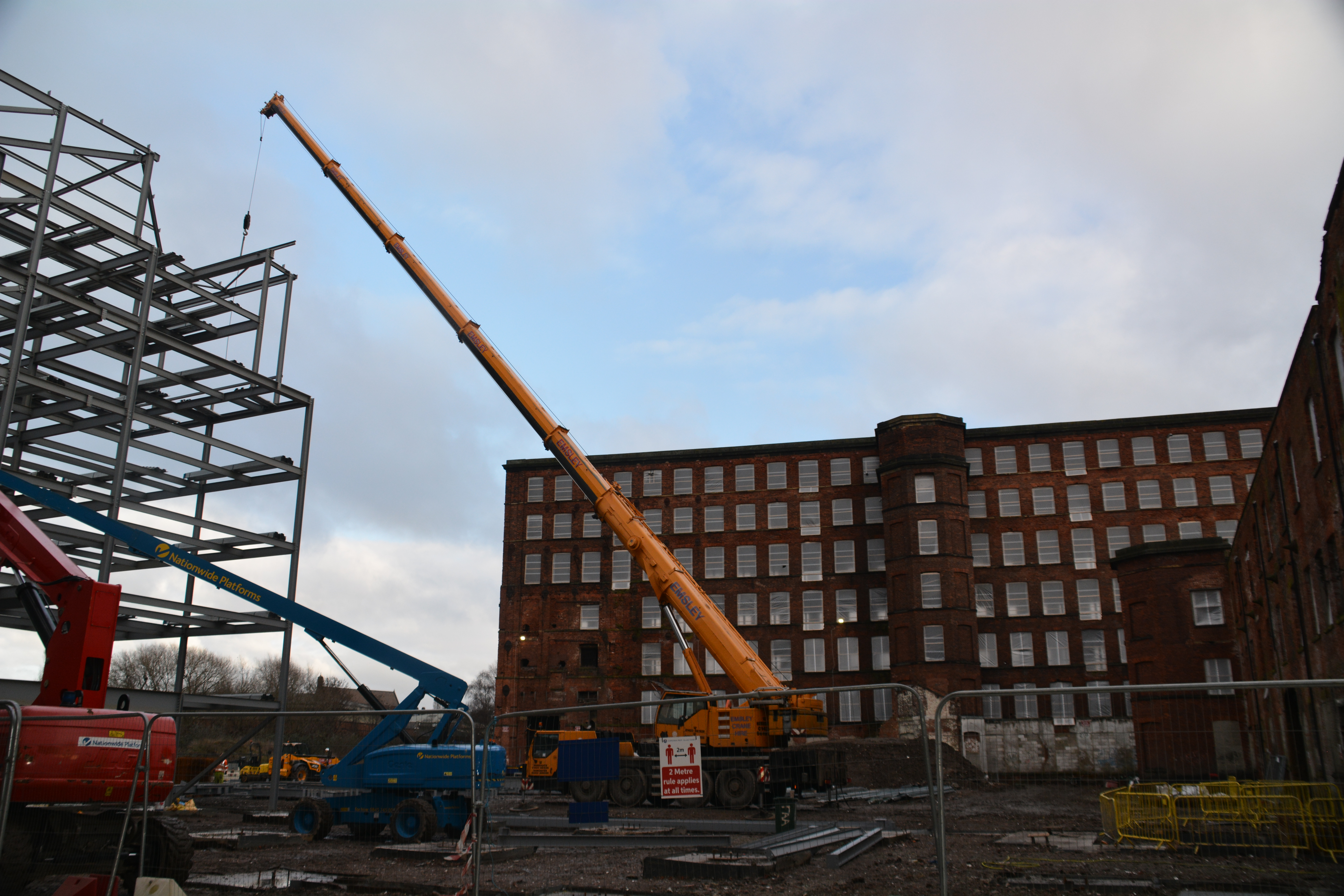
Hunslet Mills in the process of being renovated 2021

Aire Park, a 4.9 acres (2 ha) new public open space and redevelopment, is now being planned for the site surrounding The Tetley art gallery as part of the regeneration of the South Bank of Leeds.

== Governance ==
Hunslet was formerly a township in the parish of Leeds, in 1866 Hunslet became a separate civil parish, on 1 April 1925 the parish was abolished and merged with Leeds. In 1921 the parish had a population of 71,626.

== Geography ==
Hunslet, in the lower Aire Valley, is bounded on the east by the River Aire and covers nearly 1,200 acres of flat land. The underlying rocks were coal measures. Hunslet has different areas including Hunslet Moor, Hunslet Carr, Crown Point, Pottery Fields and Penny Hill.

== Economy ==
Hunslet today is still primarily based around manufacturing and heavy engineering. Newer industries have moved to the western fringes of the area in recent years with the building of new office complexes including the Leeds City Business Park which originally opened with offices for companies including O2 and British Gas. O2 have since moved to Morley. The Morrisons supermarket in the Penny Hill Centre as well as the Costco wholesale warehouse on Leathley Road are also large employers. In 2011, Aston Barclay, a car auction group, purchased the former Motor Auctions Leeds car centre on Hillidge Road to further add to the regeneration of the area.

According to an article by the Yorkshire Evening Post, 43% of the area's population lives in poverty and it has the ninth highest child poverty rate in the country, with a reported 4,579 children having been fed by food banks between April 2019 and February 2020.

== Religion ==
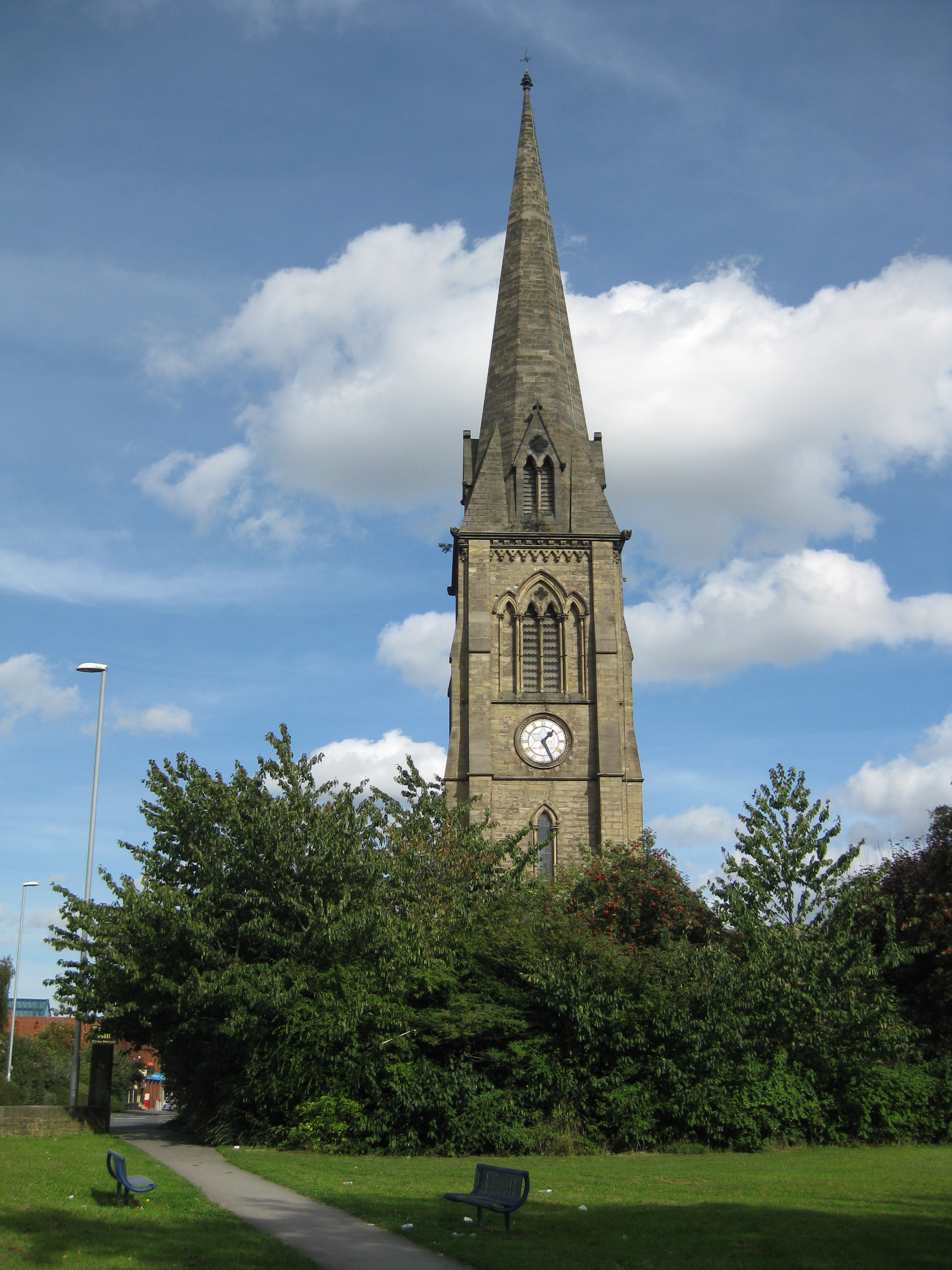
St Mary the Virgin Church

A chapel dedicated to St. Mary the Virgin was built in 1636, and enlarged in 1774. It was a brick structure with a tower. It was enlarged by subscription in 1826. There were two churches built on the site. The Victorian church, of which the spire remains, is the tallest in Leeds, was built in 1864 and the new church building surrounding it was built in the 1970s but was demolished in 2019.

Other smaller less notable churches exist in the district: see List of places of worship in the City of Leeds#Hunslet. The area is also home to St Joseph's Catholic Club (near a St Joseph's Catholic Church that was demolished in 2005 and is now part of the parish of St Margaret Clitherow). Members of the Daughters of Mary Mother of Mercy (DMMM), a religious institute of Nigerian origin, are in residence at St. Joseph's Convent.

== Hunslet Grange (Leek Street Flats) ==
Hunslet Grange (Leek Street) flats in 1973

Hunslet's redevelopment in the 1960s was notable for the construction of the Hunslet Grange (usually known as 'Leek Street Flats'). Construction of the 350 flats and maisonettes started in 1968 following a widespread slum clearance project in the area. The complex was commissioned by Leeds City Council and built by Shepherd Construction, in a maisonette style with so-called 'streets in the sky' and overhead walkways connecting blocks. The exterior of the buildings were pale grey pebbledashed concrete. Each floor had a rubbish disposal chute leading to huge bins at street level. Hidden in the complex on the second floor were shops and a public house, 'The Pioneer'. Twelve of the blocks were six storeys in height and six were of seven, with the entrance on the second floor. The estate covered a large area of Hunslet and was arranged in three clusters around a small park.

The individual flats had large windows and were spacious and light, and were very popular with their new tenants. But the popularity was short-lived; the heating systems were inadequate for the poorly insulated concrete prefabricated buildings, the interiors suffered from condensation and the exterior walls became streaked with black. In addition, the "rabbit-warren" layout made the estate hard to navigate and, within a few years, even harder to police.

Demolition of the complex started in 1983, less than fifteen years after the first tenants moved in, to be replaced with low-rise council housing, which was largely built around the late 1980s. Low Rise private housing was added in the 1990s and 2000s and a public space known as Hunslet Green occupies much of this space.

== Charities and voluntary organisations ==
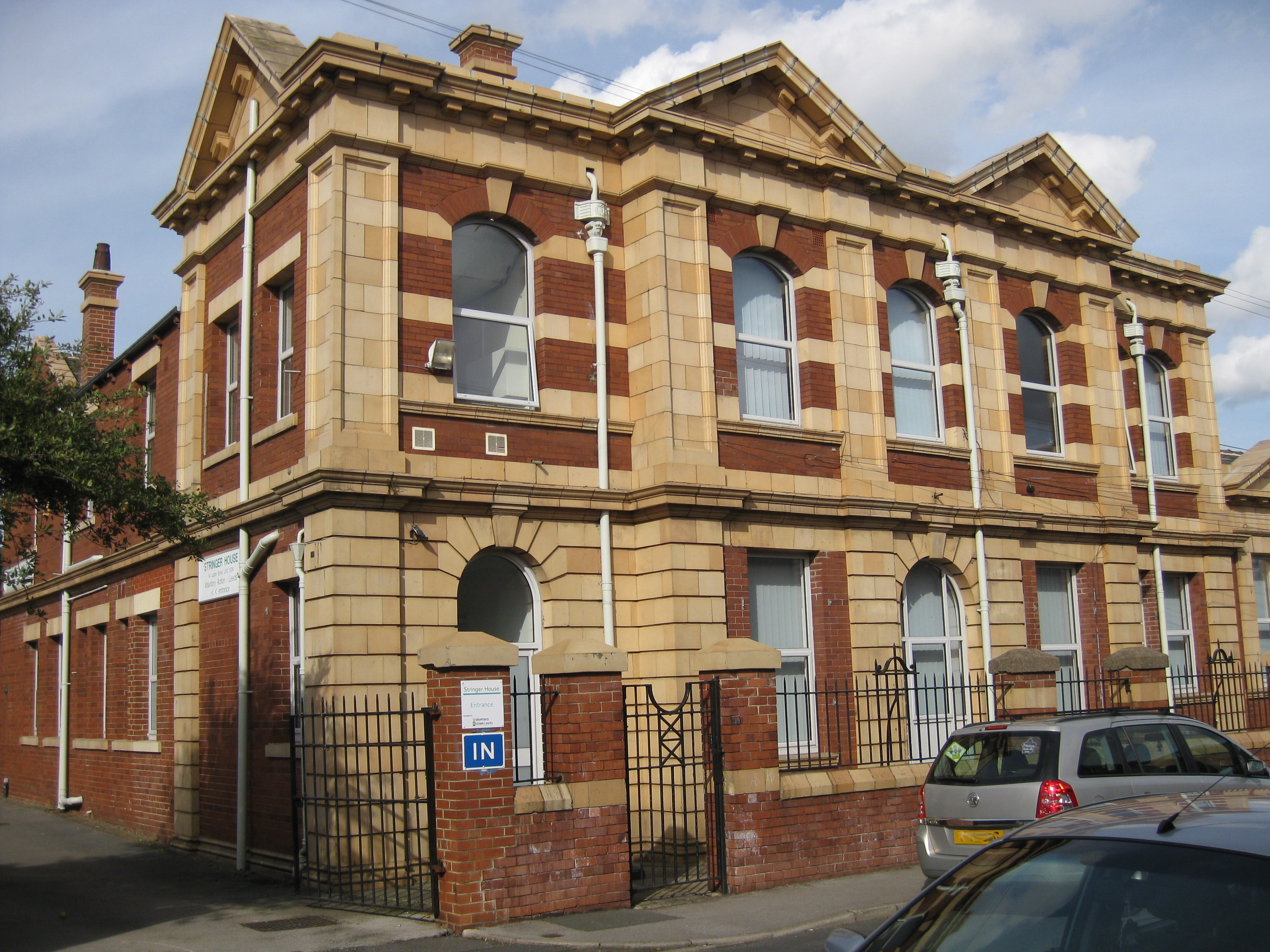
Stringer House, 34 Lupton Street, offices of Voluntary Action Leeds

The area is home to a number of voluntary organisations servicing the community, this includes the Hunslet Club, a youth organisation established in 1940 which provides sport, dance and drama activities for hundreds of young people in the area as well as offering vocational education courses for 14- to 16-year-olds.

Hunslet is also the home of Voluntary Action Leeds, the Council for Voluntary Service in Leeds, which provides direct support services and specialist advice to Voluntary Sector organisations across the city.

== Transport ==
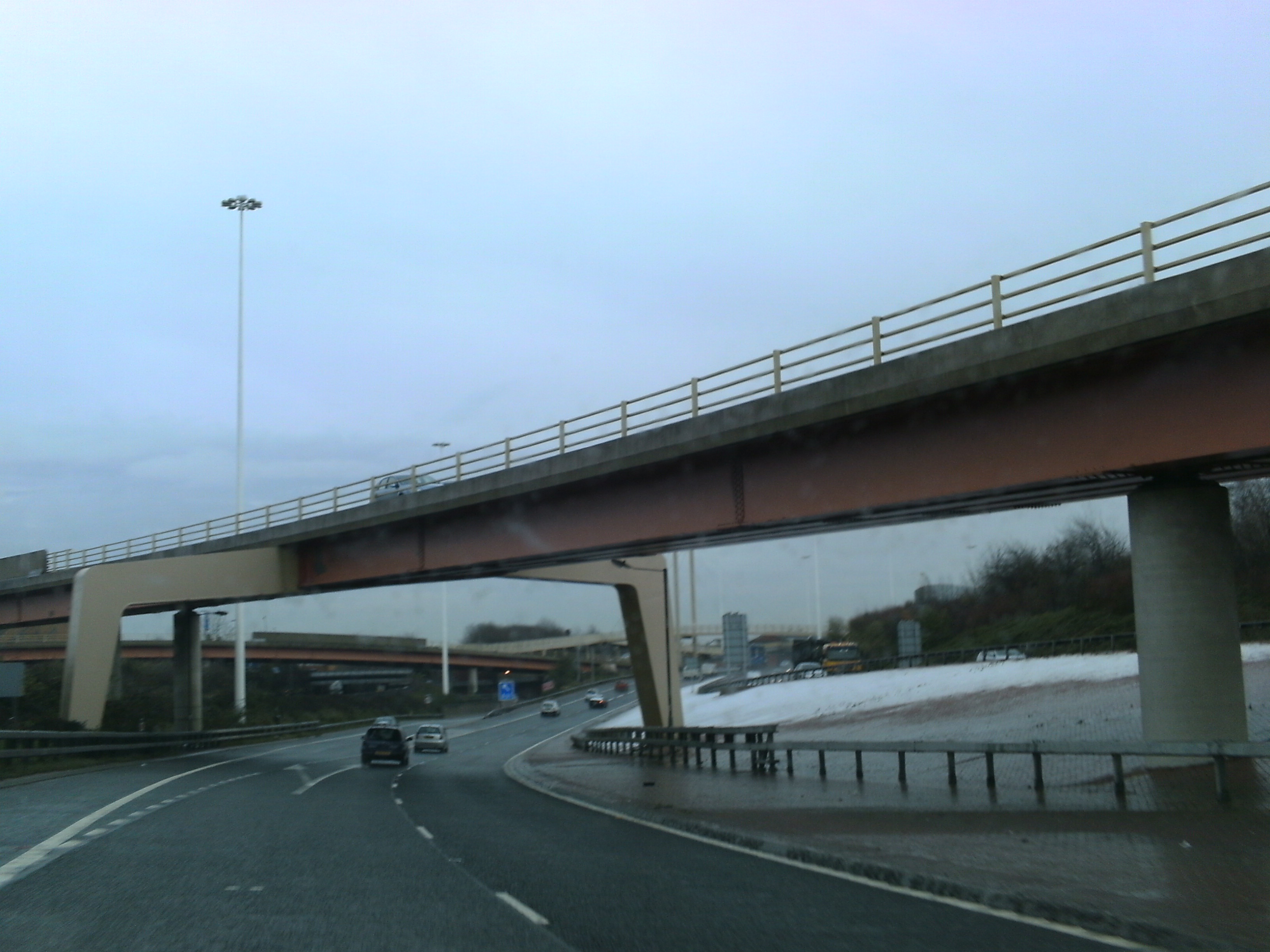
M621 junction 3, with entrance to junction 4 for Hunslet visible

The M621 and A61, two major roads, pass through the area, providing convenient access to the whole of Yorkshire and access the M62 to Manchester and Hull. The motorway was completed in 1971, and isolated a large part of Hunslet Moor.

Leeds Hunslet Lane railway station was located on the Hallam Line. It opened in 1840, but in 1846 the Midland Railway replaced it with Leeds Wellington station, and Hunslet Lane became a goods depot, which closed in 1972: the area is now occupied by the Crown Point Retail Park. There was also a passenger station on Hillidge Road: this is gone, but the Station Hotel remains. The railway yard is now used as the Leeds Vehicle Maintenance Facility for Freightliner.

== Education ==
An educational hub has been formed in the north of Hunslet, with Leeds City College's Printworks Campus using the former Alf Cooke printworks building, Leeds College of Building's Cudbear Street site, the Ruth Gorse Academy, and University Technical College Leeds (UTC) using the former Braime's engineering works, all in close proximity to each other.

Bewerley Street Infant School, designed by famous Leeds architect, George Corson, opened on 8 August 1873. By the 1950s, the school was for Juniors (7 – 11 Years) and the Infants had moved to a school on Hunslet Hall Road.

== Sport ==
The area has a rugby league club with historic roots in the form of Hunslet who play at the John Charles Centre for Sport formerly known as the South Leeds Stadium.

The original Hunslet, who played at Parkside, Hunslet, were the first club in Rugby League to win "All Four Cups" in season 1907–08, the Challenge Cup, the RFL Championship, the Yorkshire County League Cup and the Yorkshire County Cup. Only two other clubs have achieved this feat, Huddersfield (1914–15) and Swinton (1927–28). Other local rugby league clubs include Hunslet Warriors, and Hunslet Parkside.

== Notable people ==
- Arthur Greenwood, senior Labour politician, born in Hunslet
- Alf Mattison, 19th century photographer and antiquarian, was born in Hunslet in 1868.
- Peter O'Toole, actor, spent his childhood years in the district.
- Keith Waterhouse, journalist, born in Hunslet.
