= Leeds South Bank =

Proposed new town in England

Coordinates: 53°47′31″N 1°32′17″W

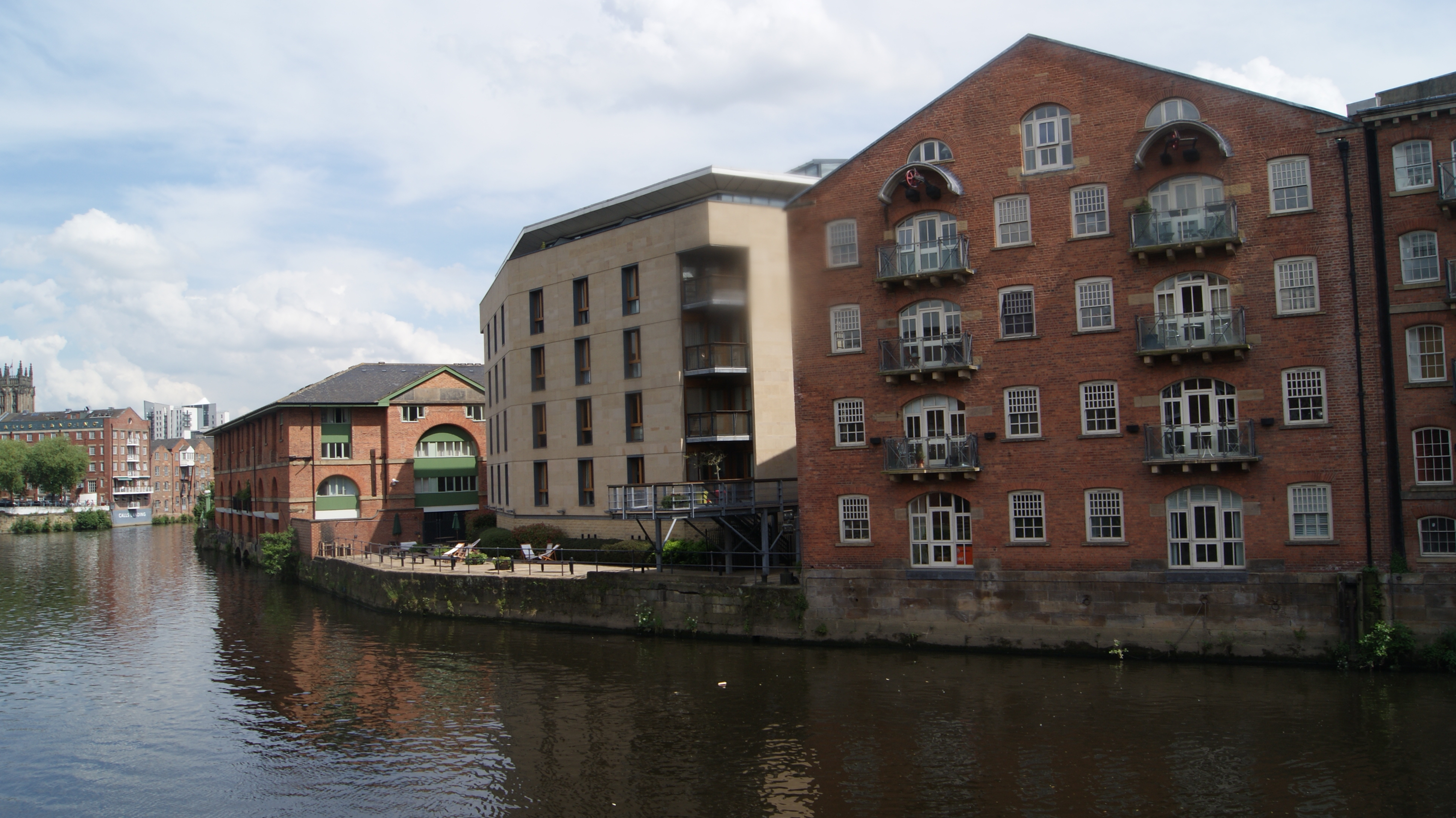
- Flats at Leeds South Bank

- Location within West Yorkshire
- Interactive map of Leeds South Bank
- Metropolitan borough: City of Leeds
- Metropolitan county: West Yorkshire
- Region: Yorkshire and the Humber
- Country: England
- Sovereign state: United Kingdom
- Post town: LEEDS
- Postcode district: LS11
- Police: West Yorkshire
- Fire: West Yorkshire
- Ambulance: Yorkshire
- UK Parliament: Leeds South

Leeds South Bank is a proposed new town in Leeds, West Yorkshire, England. The development is under construction and is located to the south of Leeds city centre.

== Development ==
The South Bank project was established by the Leeds Transformational Regeneration Partnership. The regeneration is priced at £350 million, and the project is supported by Leeds City Council.

In September 2025, Leeds South Bank was named as one of 12 locations by the government's New Towns Taskforce. South Bank will be one of three completed by 2029. The South Bank regeneration seeks to create 35,000 jobs and 8,000 new homes. The redevelopment involves the industrial districts of Holbeck and Hunslet.

In March 2026, the Ministry of Housing, Communities and Local Government announced that Leeds South Bank was one of seven shortlisted areas for potential development. (Note: The other areas were Brabazon and West Innovation Arc, Gloucestershire; Crews Hill and Chase Park, Enfield; Tempsford, Bedfordshire; Thamesmead, southeast London; Victoria North, Manchester; and a site in Milton Keynes.) Further consultation is expected to take place, with final decisions due later in the year. In June 2026, West Yorkshire Combined Authority announced the release of funding intended to help realise the potential to build 20,000 new homes in the area.

== Park ==
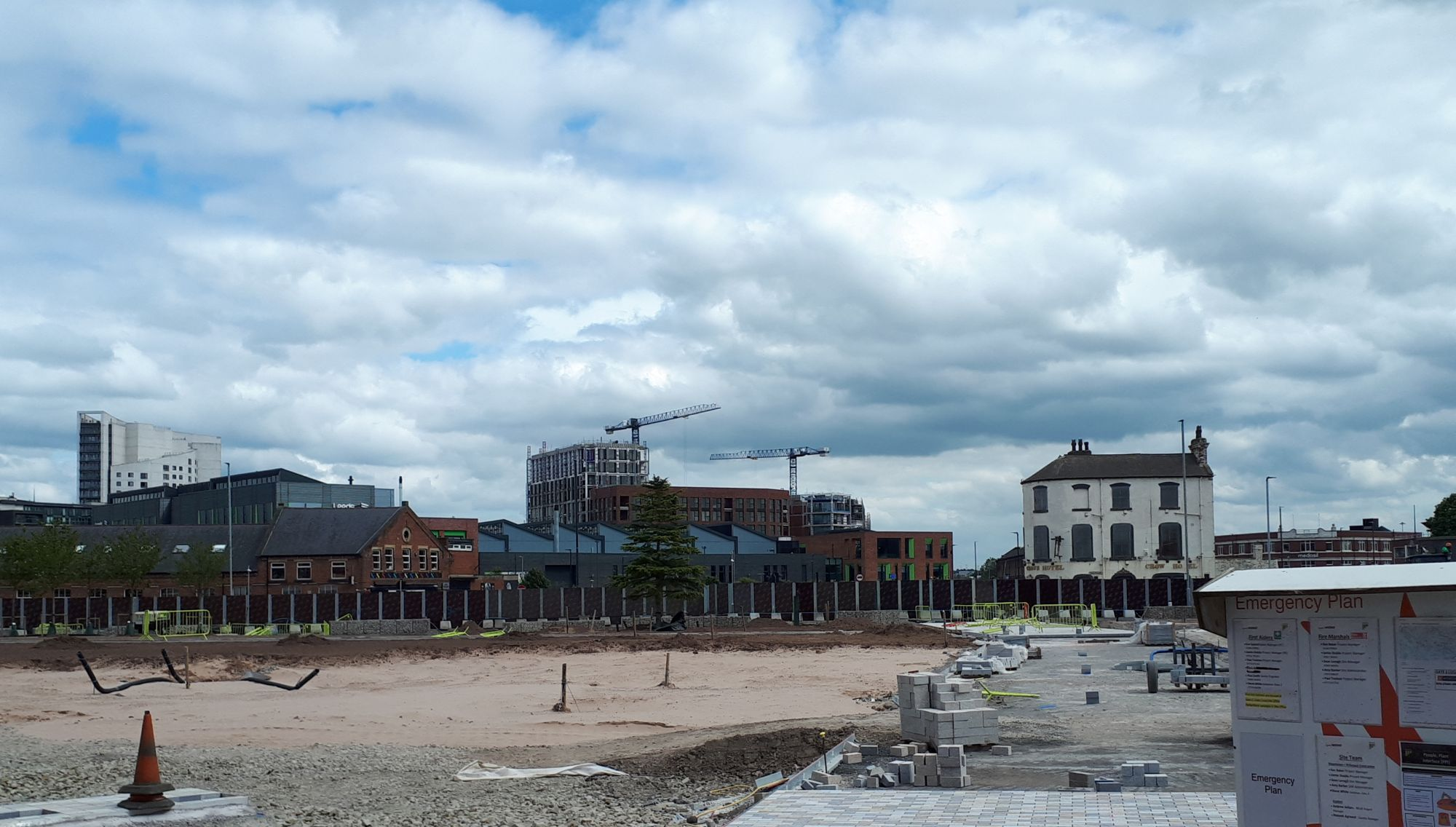
Development at Aire Park

In July 2025, the 8-acre (3.2 ha) Aire Park was opened. It is the largest new public park in the United Kingdom.

== See also ==
- New towns in the United Kingdom
