= Pippa Hale =

British artist

- Education: Warwickshire College of Further Education, Leeds University
- Website: pippahale.com

Pippa Hale is a contemporary British artist, founder of the Northern Art Prize and co-founder of Leeds contemporary art gallery The Tetley.

== Early life ==
Hale studied for a Foundation Diploma in Art and Design at Warwickshire College of Further Education in Leamington Spa, graduating in 1991 and going on at Leeds University graduating with BA (Hons) Fine Art in 1996.

== Practice ==
=== Commissions ===
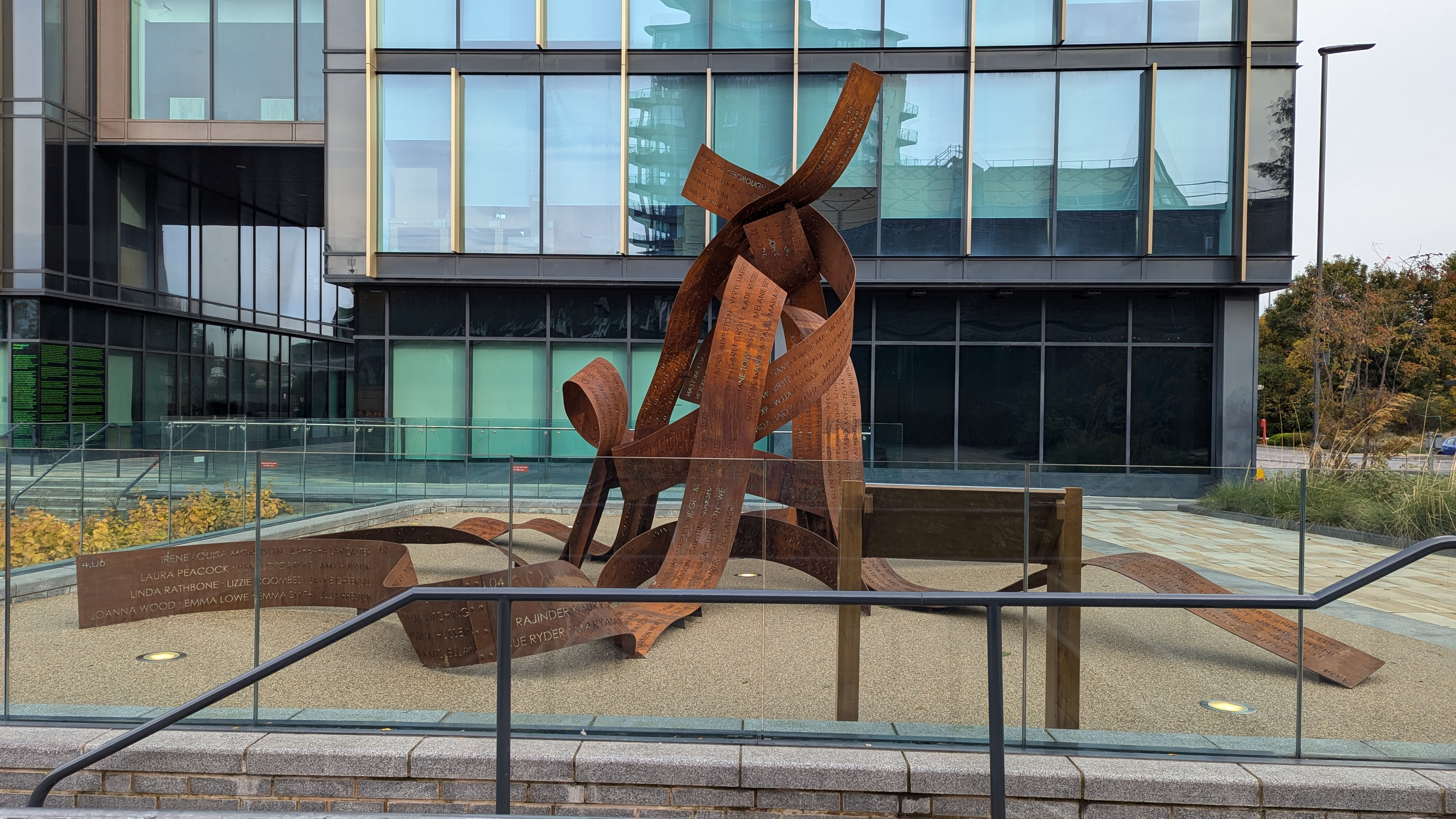
Ribbons (2024)

In 2019, as part of a joint project developed by Rachel Reeves in partnership with Leeds City Council and Leeds Art University, Hale's sculpture Ribbons was commissioned from a shortlist of three other artists to redress the imbalance of women portrayed within the public sphere. It was unveiled in 2024 in Quarry Hill, Leeds, and includes the names of 383 women chosen for the sculpture by vote.

=== Exhibitions ===
- 2019-20 Play Rebellion at the Baltic Centre for Contemporary Art, Gateshead originally commissioned as part the MAPS festival by Chalk.
- 2019 PlayShapes for the MAPS festival by Chalk at the Baltic Centre for Contemporary Art, Gateshead.
- 2019 Exhibition of shortlisted artists for Feminist Public Sculpture, Leeds Arts University Gallery
- 2010 Beyond The Dustheaps, The Dickens Museum, London
- 2009 Town and Country, PSL [Project Space Leeds] and Harewood House Trust
- 2006 For The North, Generator Projects, Dundee
- 2005 Launch Pad, Vitrine, Leeds
- 2005 Multiples, LOT, Bristol
- 2004 Thermo04, The Lowry, Salford
- 2003 Artranspennine04, The Walker Art Gallery, Liverpool; Manchester Art Gallery; Leeds City Art Gallery and The Ferens, Hull
- 2003 Last Few Days, The Merrion Centre, Leeds
- 2000 Common Prayer, Gallery II, Bradford University
- 2000 Guest House Twenty, Site Gallery and various locations in Sheffield in association with UTK

== Personal life ==
=== Charitable work ===
From 2008 to 2012 Hale was a council member of the Leeds Civic Trust, in the same period she also served as secretary to the Leeds Visual Arts Forum. In 2015 she stepped down as co-director of The Tetley and joined the board of trustees of its management company, Leeds Project Space, where she served for a further three years, resigning from this role in 2018. She is currently a trustee of the education charity IVE.
