= Tetley's Brewery =

Brewery in Leeds, West Yorkshire, England

- Company type: Subsidiary
- Industry: Brewing
- Founded: 1822
- Founder: Joshua Tetley
- Defunct: 2011
- Headquarters: Hunslet, Leeds; West Yorkshire, England
- Area served: United Kingdom (some export markets)
- Key people: Joshua Tetley
- Products: Beer
- Owner: Carlsberg UK
- Parent: Carlsberg Group

Tetley's Brewery (Joshua Tetley & Son Limited) was an English regional brewery founded in 1822 by Joshua Tetley in Hunslet, now a suburb of Leeds, West Yorkshire. The beer was originally produced at the Leeds Brewery, which was later renamed the Leeds Tetley Brewery to avoid confusion with a microbrewery of the same name.

A takeover of the nearby Melbourne Brewery in 1960 secured Tetley's position as the largest brewer in Leeds. That same year they merged with Walkers of Warrington to form Tetley Walker. Tetley Walker had an estate of over 1,000 tied houses in Yorkshire alone and a further 2,000 outside the county. In 1961 Tetley merged with Ind Coope of Burton upon Trent and Ansells of Birmingham to form Allied Breweries, then the world's largest brewing conglomerate. At its height in the 1960s, the Leeds Brewery employed a thousand people. In 1978 Allied merged with J. Lyons to form Allied Lyons. The brewery became the world's largest producer of cask ale during the 1980s. In 1998 Tetley was taken over by Carlsberg Group.

The Leeds Brewery was closed in 2011, and demolished in 2012, with production contracted out by Carlsberg to breweries in Wolverhampton, Tadcaster and Hartlepool. Tetley still sponsors Leeds Rhinos Rugby League club.

In 2012, Tetley's was the eleventh highest selling beer brand in the United Kingdom. It is the second highest selling ale brand in the world after John Smith's, with volumes of 700,000 hectolitres. Its main products are Tetley's Cask and Tetley's Smoothflow.

== History ==
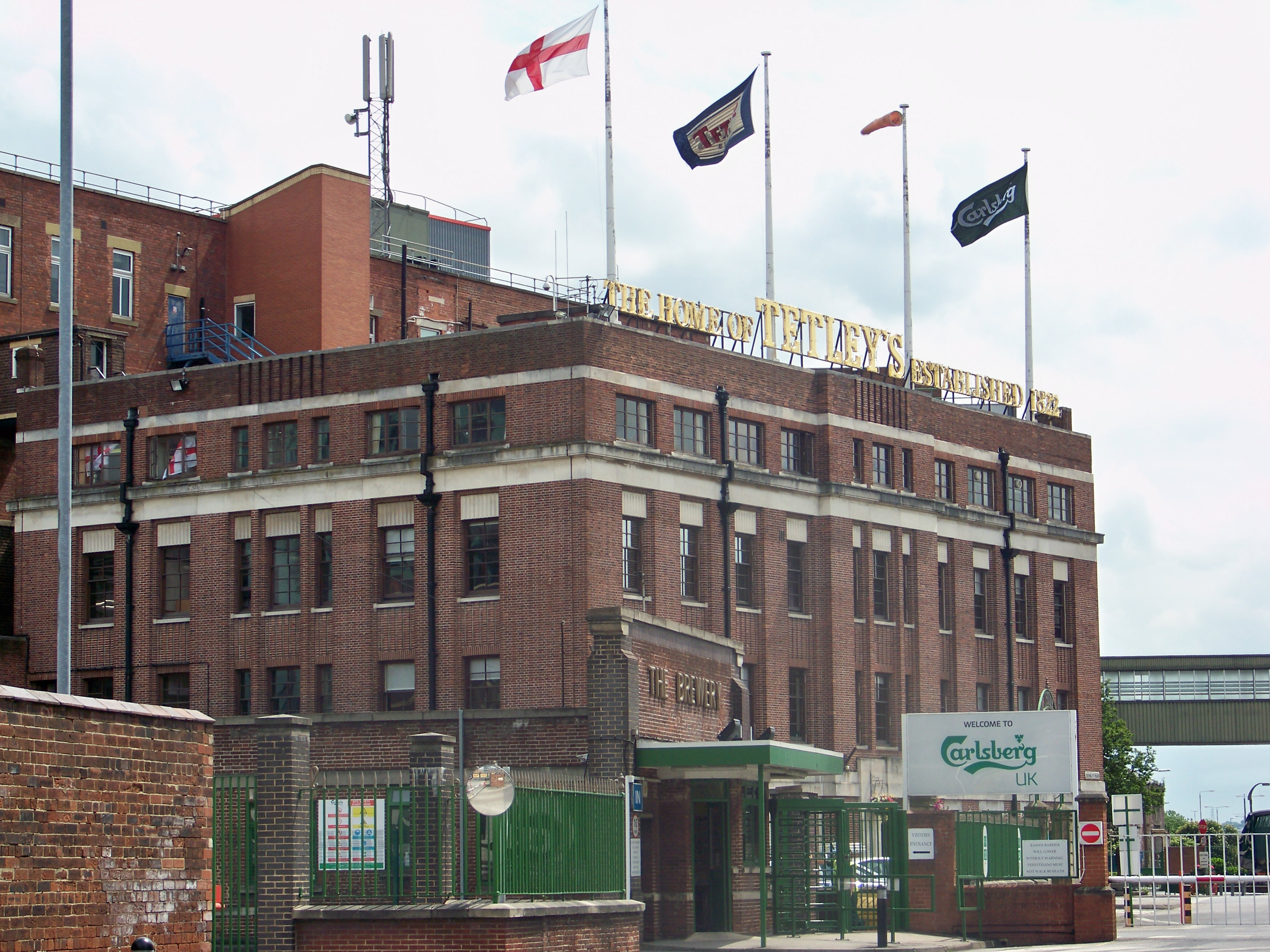
Tetley's Brewery 1931 art deco headquarters in 2010.

The Tetley family's links with the beer industry go back to the 1740s when William Tetley was described as a maltster in Armley, near Leeds. His son William expanded the business, which in turn was passed to his son Joshua. Joshua Tetley leased the largest brewery in Leeds, located at Salem Place, Hunslet for £409 in 1822.

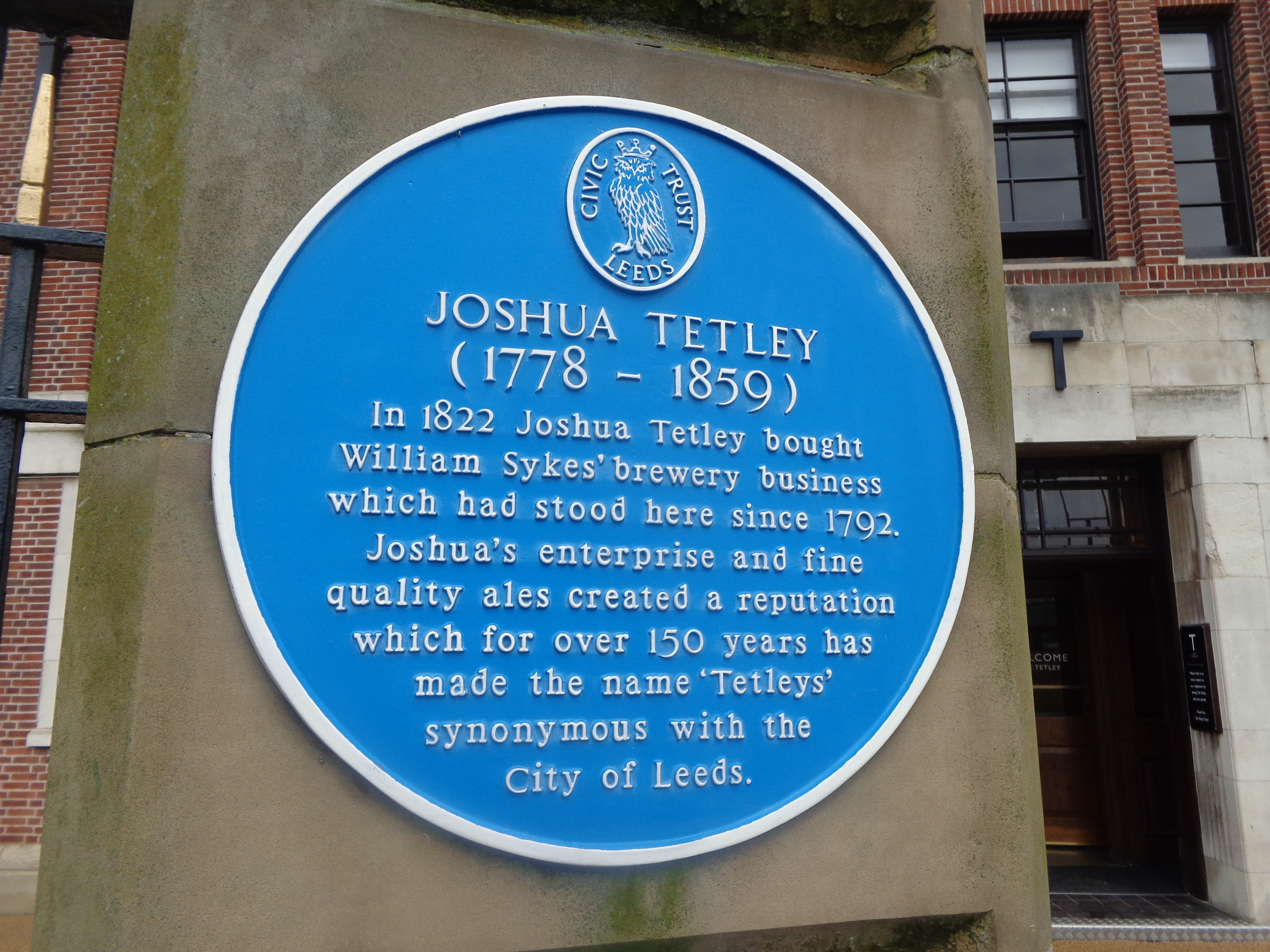
Blue plaque, Leeds

Joshua Tetley and Son was created in 1839 when Joshua made his son, Francis William, a partner. By this time the brewery was turning a profit of almost £3000 a year. The brewery employed 32 men by 1848, and was mostly brewing porter and mild ale. Construction of a new brewery designed by George Corson began in 1852. Joshua died in 1859, leaving the business to Francis, who took on his brother in law, Charles Ryder, as a partner.

By 1860 Tetley was the largest brewery in the North of England and by 1864 the company had begun an ambitious building scheme. Although Tetley mostly brewed mild throughout the nineteenth century, pale ale, which was gaining in popularity, made up an increasing percentage of production. By 1875, annual beer production was 171,500 barrels. Tetley bought its first two public houses in 1890. Only one remains today, The Fleece in Farsley, Leeds. The other, the Duke William, which was in Tetley’s yard, was "unceremoniously demolished" by Carlsberg in 2002. In July 1897, the company became a public limited company valued at £572,848, and used the funding to launch a bottling operation. A large tied estate had been established by 1914.

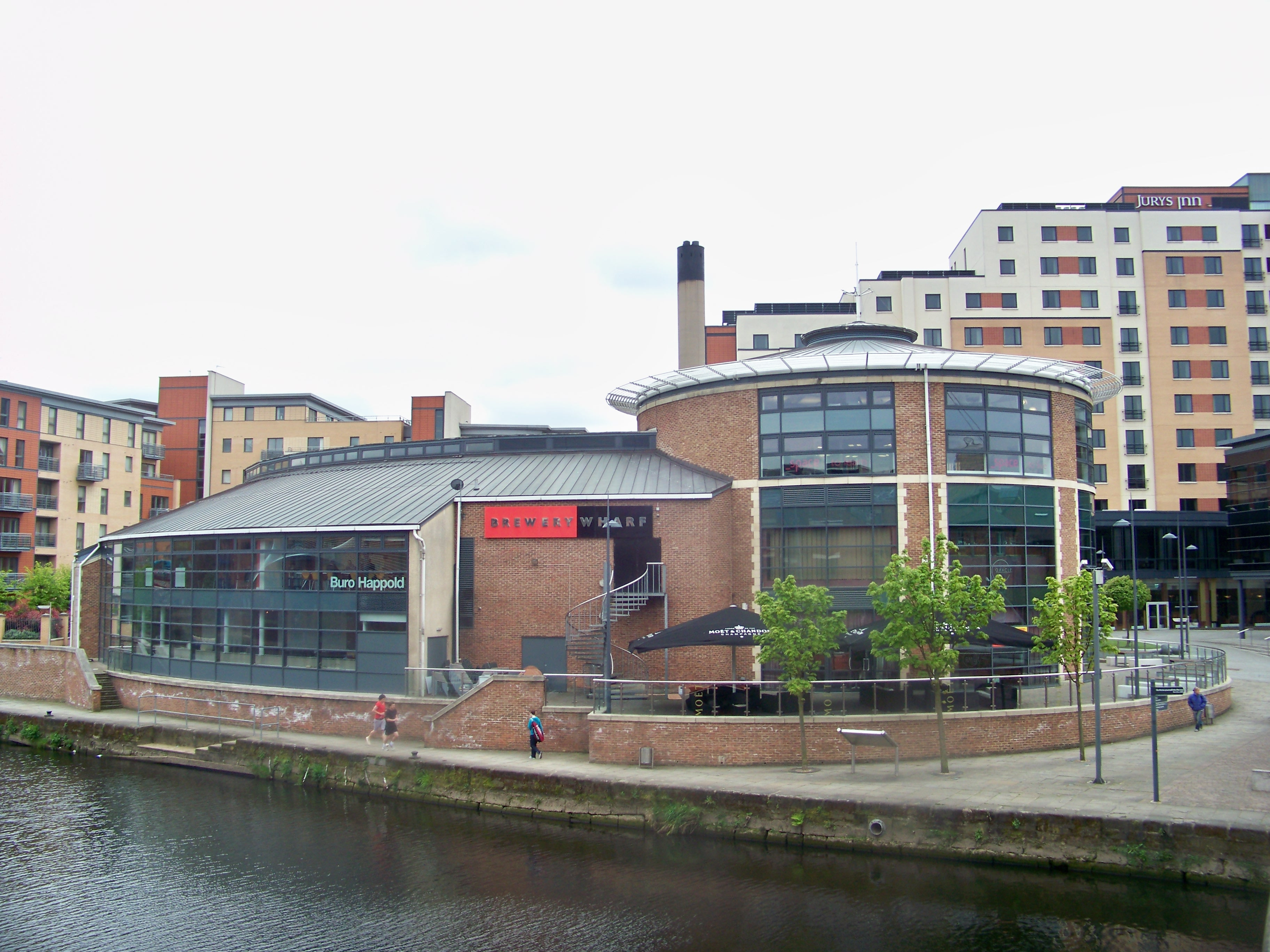
Brewery Wharf; the building shown was formerly the Brewery Museum.

In 1931, the art deco Tetley headquarters building was erected. In 1954, the Gilmour Brewery of Sheffield was acquired in a friendly takeover, along with 500 tied houses. Tetley's position as Leeds' largest brewer was confirmed in April 1960 when it announced a takeover of Leeds' Melbourne Brewery. The takeover was a friendly one, and Melbourne had approached Tetley about the merger. The brewery and its 245 tied houses were acquired for £3.5 million. Production of Melbourne beer immediately ceased, although Tetley Mild was brewed at the Melbourne brewery until 1962. Tetley relied on the quality of its beer to drive sales in the free trade.

Later in 1960 they merged with Walkers of Warrington to form Tetley Walker. Tetley Walker owned over one thousand tied houses in Yorkshire alone and a further two thousand outside the county. In 1961 Tetley merged with Ind Coope and Ansells to form Allied Breweries, then the world's largest brewing conglomerate. During the 1960s the brewery employed over a thousand workers. A new brewhouse was built in 1964. By the 1970s half of Leeds' pubs were owned by Tetley. During the 1970s Tetley's was Britain's largest cask ale brewery, producing 1 million barrels a year. In 1978 Allied merged with J. Lyons to form Allied Lyons.

During the 1980s Tetley benefited from the increase in sales of cask ale. An impartial customer survey in the 1980s concluded that Tetley had achieved an almost irrational level of customer support, particularly in West Yorkshire, in part because of traditional loyalty, partly because of highly effective television campaigns such as the Tetley Bittermen, and also because of a consistently high quality product. The brewhouse was updated in 1984.

In 1993 Allied Lyons sold a 50 per cent stake in the company to Carlsberg. The brewery opened a museum on 19 March 1994. The attraction proved popular; however, redevelopment of the land surrounding the brewery led to the attraction's closure on 7 April 2000. The building is now bars and restaurants. By 1996, sales of Tetley Bitter were overtaken by sales of John Smith's, and the product has retained the number two ale position ever since. This is largely attributed to Tetley's ineffective marketing campaigns. In 1998 Tetley's was fully taken over by Carlsberg. In 2004 Tetley was dropped from the Carlsberg-Tetley name. The company is now called Carlsberg UK Limited and is a part of Carlsberg AS group. In 2006, Tetley's sold 185 million pints of beer in pubs. In the same year, the brewery's dray horses, which had made beer deliveries to pubs around Leeds, were retired.

The brewery's closure was announced in 2008. A Carlsberg spokesman said, "It is an old brewery and the one in Northampton is bigger and modern." In December 2010, production of Tetley's cask products was transferred to Banks's brewery in Wolverhampton. Tetley Smoothflow will be brewed by Coors in Tadcaster and Tetley keg Dark Mild, Mild and Imperial will be brewed by Cameron's of Hartlepool. The final brew took place on 22 February 2011. Lager production was transferred to Northampton. Despite protests that Tetley Cask brewed in Wolverhampton would taste different, the new beer has been greeted with a warm reception.

== Brewery ==
The brewery was situated on the south banks of the River Aire near Crown Point, Hunslet and Clarence Dock. In 1906 the brewery stood on a fraction of its current site between Brook Street, Hunslet Road (this part now being known as Hunslet Lane), Crown Point Road and Waterloo Street. Many smaller streets in the vicinity have since disappeared under the ever extending brewery. All fermenting took place in stainless steel Yorkshire squares and conical vessels; the slate Yorkshire squares, dating from about the 1880s, were removed in autumn 2008. The closure of the brewery was announced on 5 November 2008. The brewery finally closed its doors on 17 June 2011, by which time it occupied 22 acres. Carlsberg tried to redeploy some staff throughout the group but 179 staff did lose their jobs.

== Beers ==
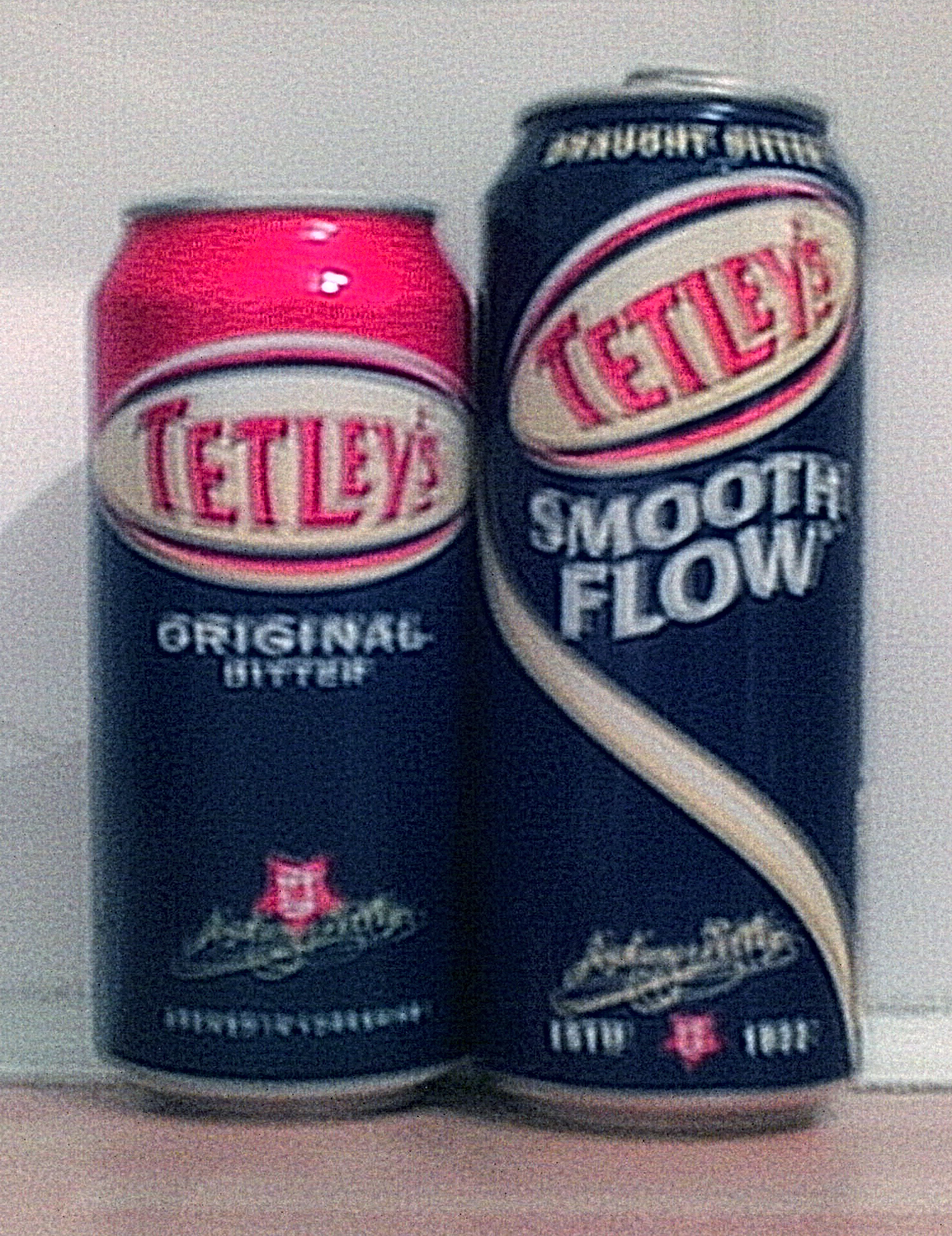
Tetley's Original (left), Smoothflow (right) designs used during the 1990s and 2000s

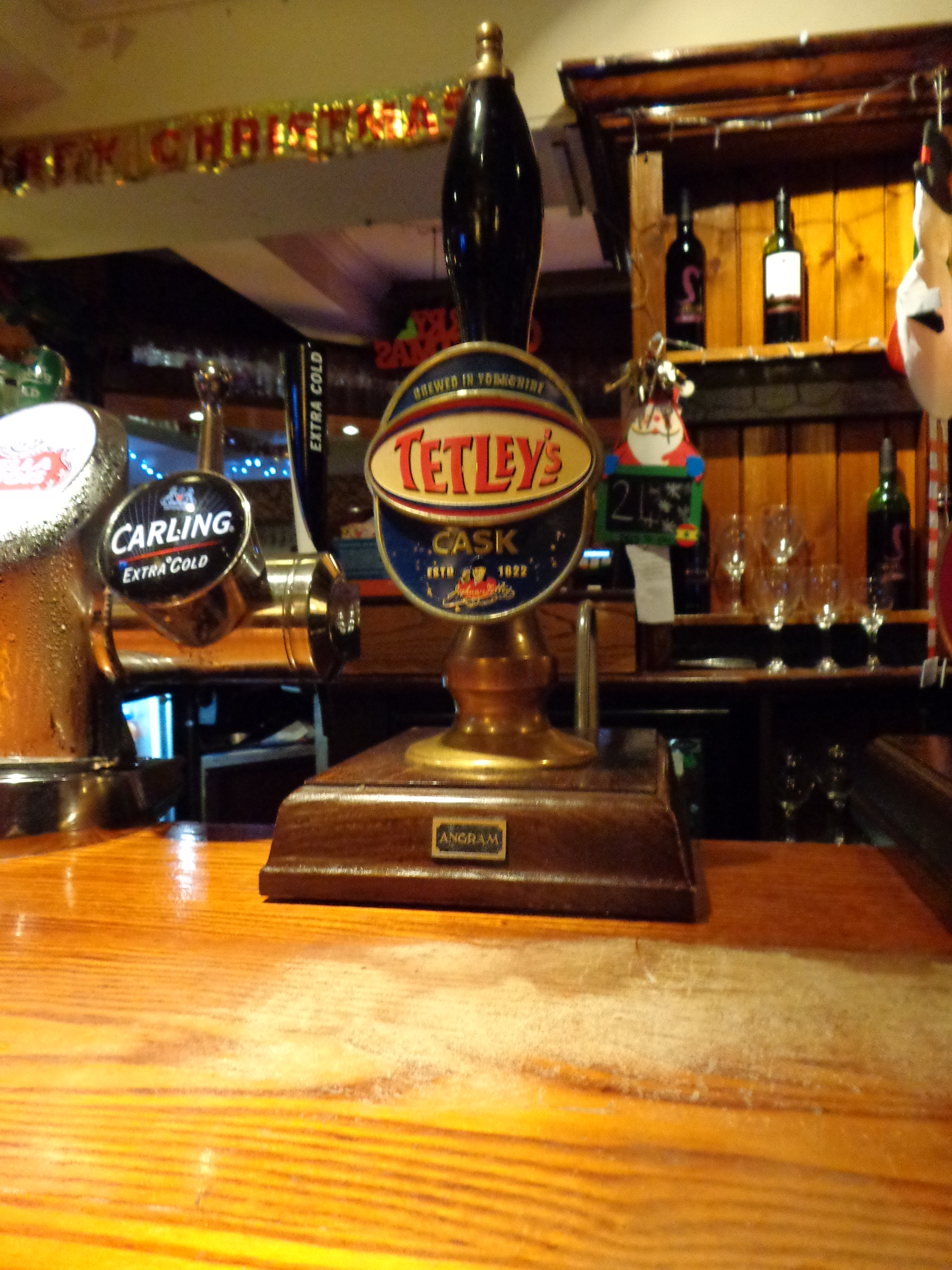
A Tetley's Cask beer pump

The highest selling Tetley product is Smoothflow, a nitrogenated 3.6% ABV ale served at 8 °C (46 °F). It is available in kegs and cans with a widget. It is sold overseas as Tetley's English Ale. The same beer, but not nitrogenated and without the widget in the can, is sold as Tetley's Original.

Tetley's Cask (3.7% ABV) is the original cask conditioned version of the product. Carlsberg recommend always using a sparkler when serving the product. It is brewed under contract for Tetley by Marston's Park Brewery in Wolverhampton, using the Yorkshire square method, and a dual-strain yeast. Another cask beer, Tetley's Gold, was introduced in 2012.

Carlsberg brew the Tetley's Mild (3.2% ABV) in both light and dark forms.

Imperial – Originally created for the Teesside market, and at one point was advertised as "Teesside's favourite pint". It was launched nationally as a premium 4.3% cask ale in 2002. It used three separate yeasts and had eight months of development, but the variant has since been withdrawn. It continues as a pasteurised ale in kegs.

About 24,000 hectolitres of Tetley's Milds and Imperial were sold in 2010.

== Advertising ==
Tetley's advertising suffered during the 1980s when its television advertisements focussed too heavily on a folksy, old fashioned idea of Yorkshire life. From 1999 – 2006 Tetley used "Smoothly Does It" as its slogan. In 2006 the slogan became 'Don't Do Things By Halves'. Following a break for a number of years from television advertising, Tetley returned to the screens in October 2010 as a sponsor of evening programming on ITV4.

In 1920, the huntsman logo was introduced. In 2000 Tetley's dropped its traditional huntsman logo, due to growing anti-hunt feelings in the UK; the brand instead adopting a rugby ball shaped logo in line with its heavy sponsorship of rugby league. In 2010 the image was revived. The image however has been simplified from the original. The branding colours have been changed back from blue and yellow (in line with their sponsorship of Leeds Rhinos) to the traditional yellow and red.

=== Sponsorship ===
==== Rugby League ====
Along with John Player, Tetley became rugby league football's first ever sponsors for the 1971–72 season. For many years Tetley sponsored Leeds RLFC; they then sponsored their successor Leeds Rhinos from their formation until 2006 and Warrington Wolves in 2001. Tetley's also sponsored the Rugby league Super League from 2000 until 2004. Tetley's remain a major sponsor at Leeds Rhinos and are the official beer of most Super League clubs. Tetley's also sponsor the stadium of Dewsbury Rams which under a sponsorship deal is known as the Tetley's Stadium. Tetley sponsored rugby league's longest running competition, the Challenge Cup for the 2013–2014 seasons.

==== Rugby Union ====
Tetley's were the main sponsor of Rugby Union club Northampton Saints from 1998-2001, including during their first Heineken Cup win in 2000, and continued to play a large role in the club until the early 2020s, with Franklin's Gardens' main stand named after the brewery from its construction in 2001 until 2023. In the past they have also sponsored Llanelli RFC, Newport RFC and Leeds RUFC.

==== Cricket ====
Tetley's Bitter also sponsored the England cricket team between 1994 and 1998.

=== Other forms of advertising ===
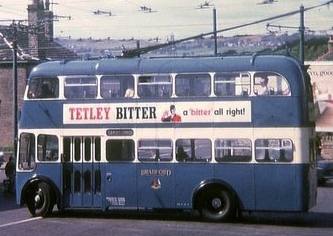
Tetley's Bitter advertised on a Bradford Trolleybus in 1970.

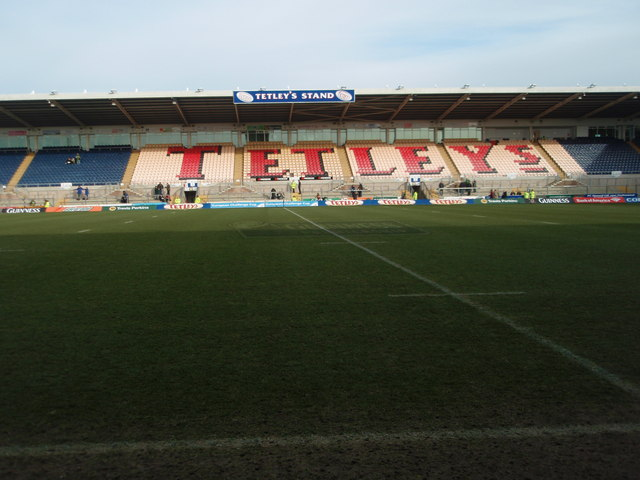
The then Tetley's stand at Northampton Saints' Franklin's Gardens, since 2023 it has been known as the Carlsberg stand.

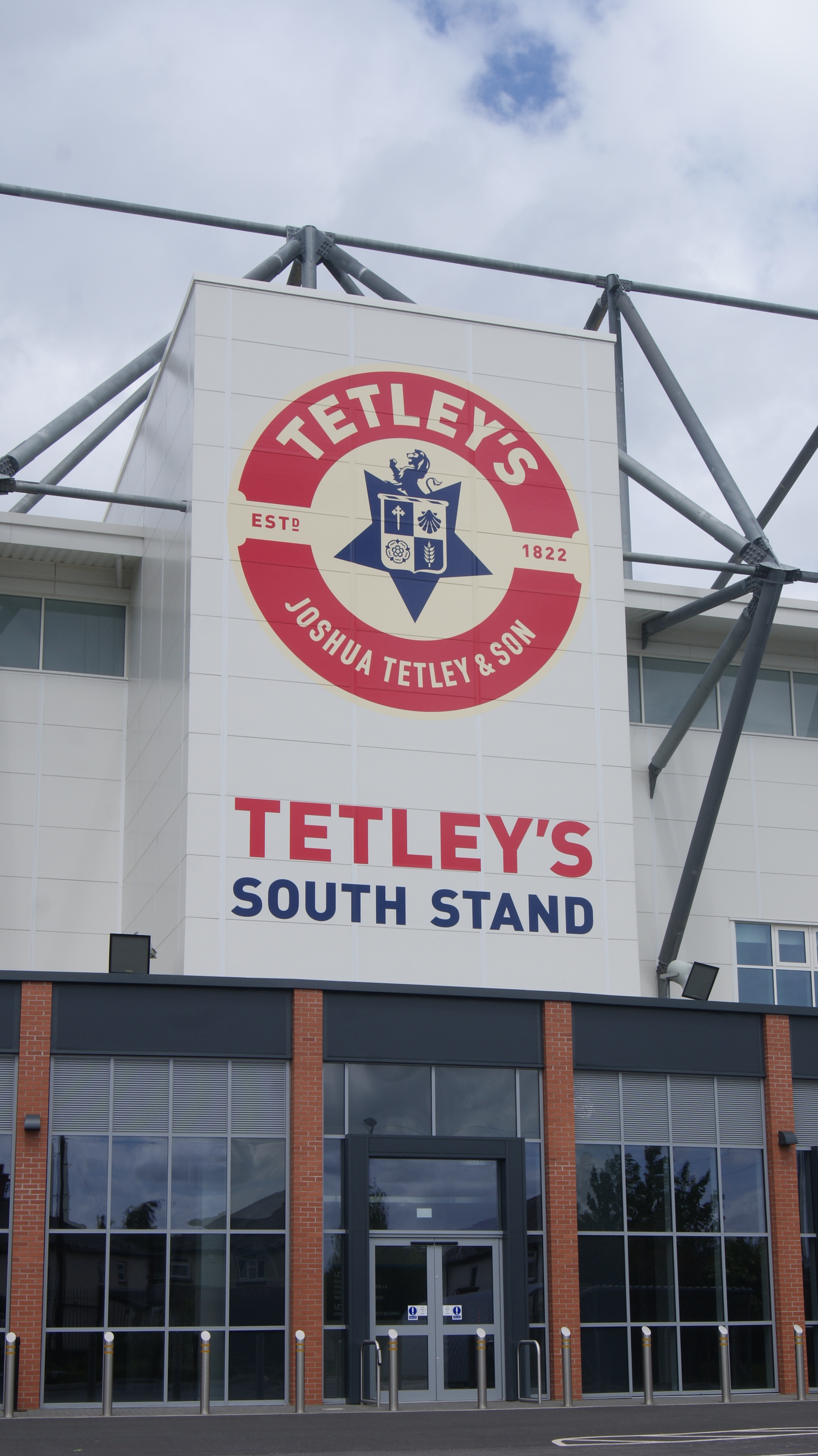
Tetley's sponsor the South stand at the Headingley Rugby Stadium in Leeds.

An early form of advertising occurred in 1911 when Tetley challenged escape artist Harry Houdini to escape from a padlocked metal cask of ale. Houdini accepted this challenge; however, it proved too much for him and he had to be rescued from the cask.

Tetley's make use of billboards for a lot of their advertising, particularly across Leeds. Hoardings at the side of sports pitches are used, and such have often been rented at Elland Road and the Headingley Carnegie Stadium (both on the Leeds Rhinos side and the Yorkshire County Cricket Club side.

In the late 1980s / early 1990s as part of the UK 'heritage boom' Tetley's developed Brewery Wharf as an 'interactive visitor centre' along the lines of the contemporary developments at Granada Studios Manchester. Visitors were greeted and guided by historic characters illustrating the story of the brewery. This development took place alongside the first redevelopments of the river and canal zones of Leeds.

== Closure ==
On 5 November 2008, Carlsberg UK announced they intended to close the plant in 2011, moving production to Northampton, owing to the falling demand for beer and lager products in the UK. The move was first reported on BBC Radio Leeds. The company was criticised for choosing to announce the closure the day after Barack Obama was elected US president to ensure the news would not get any significant coverage in the British national press, leaving only Look North the Yorkshire Evening Post, Calendar and BBC Radio Leeds to cover it locally.

== The Tetley ==
Tetley's Brewery office headquarters took on a new lease of life in 2013, when the former brewery site re-opened as "The Tetley", a contemporary art gallery. The 1930s building was transformed to house gallery spaces, a learning studio, an artist residency studio, offices for creative businesses, a bar a restaurant and function rooms for meetings and events such as performances, parties and conferences. The gallery maintains many original features of the offices, including the wooden panelling that runs throughout the spaces, the directors' boardroom, the staircase and passenger lift, and a war memorial which commemorates the Tetley employees that served in the First World War.

Aire Park, a 24-acre development with a new, 8-acre public park at its centre, is now being planned for the site surrounding the Tetley as part of the regeneration of the South Bank of Leeds.

== Archives ==
There are many objects and records from the Tetley Brewery that have survived. The Tetley gallery holds a collection of hundreds of items relating to the history of the brewery, including artworks and artefacts, such as paintings, silverware and furniture, tools, and commemorative beers. A selection of original pub signs and bottles from the collection is displayed in a case on the ground floor, next to the bar and restaurant.

The Leeds branch of the West Yorkshire Archive Service hold an extensive collection of Tetley's Brewery records under 'Joshua Tetley & Son Ltd.' The collection relates mainly to the history of Tetley's Beer at the Leeds Brewery, but also includes records of companies that were incorporated into Tetley's such as Whitaker and Company Ltd, Leeds and Wakefield Breweries Ltd and Allied Breweries Ltd. The collection contains records relating to the Brewery staff, production and sales, brewing journals, books and experimental brew reports, photographs of the brewing process and public houses, and Tetley's promotional material.

The Joshua Tetley & Son Ltd collection also includes records of the 7th West Riding of Yorkshire Rifles Volunteers formed in 1860. The Tetley Brewery played an important role in the creation of the Leeds Rifles as many of their employees were recruited. At the outbreak of the First World War, 261 of Tetley's men joined the services, and of those, 25 were killed and 55 were wounded. They also lost 20 of their shire horses during the War.

== See also ==
- Economy of Leeds
- List of companies based in Leeds
