= The Tetley =

Art gallery and former brewery in Leeds, England

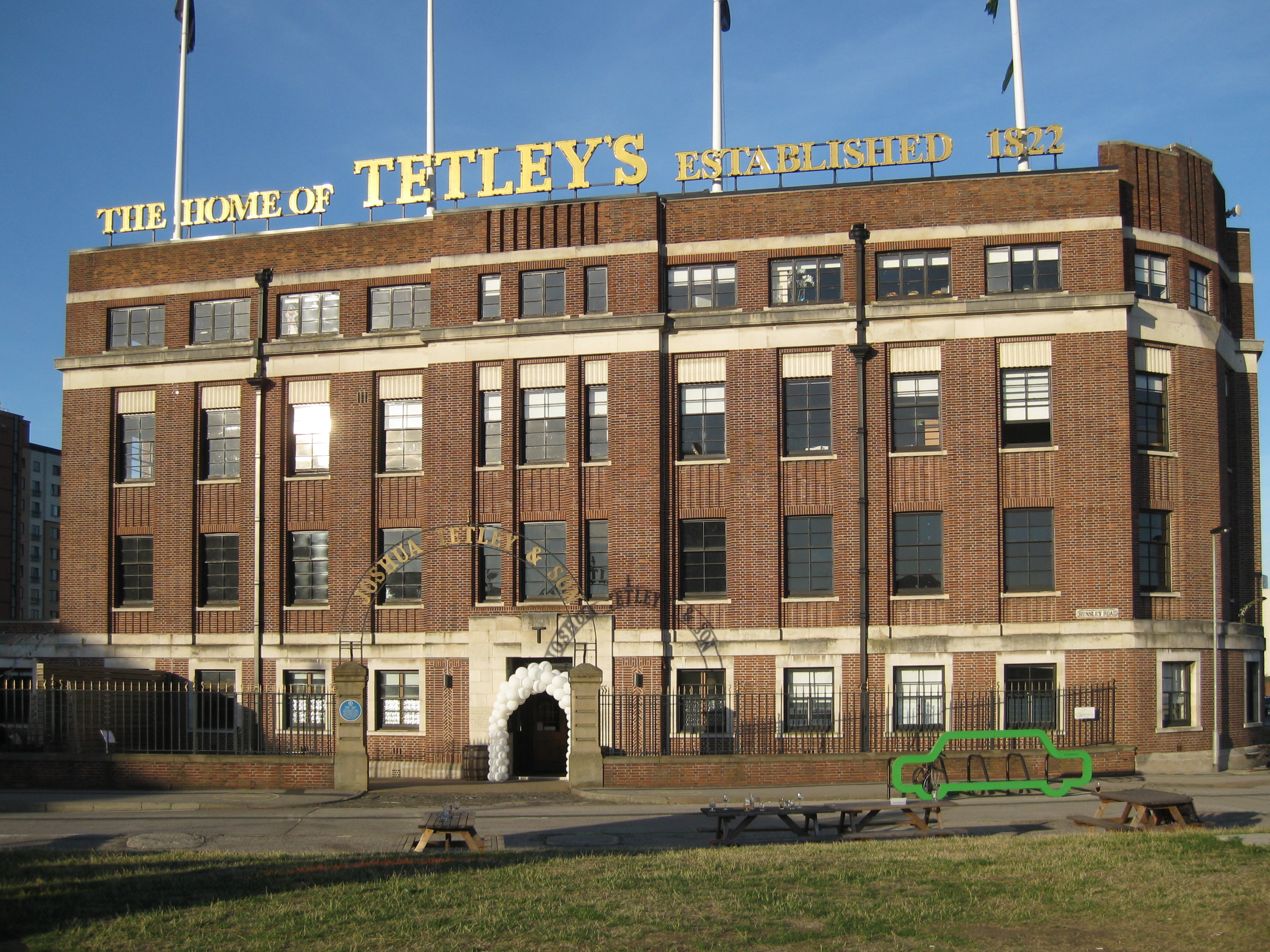
- Established: 2013
- Dissolved: 2023
- Location: Yorkshire
- Coordinates: 53.792093°N 1.5397462°W
- Visitors: 484,491 (2018)
- Founders: Pippa Hale and Kerry Harker (Project Space Leeds)
- Director: Bryony Bond (Creative Director)
- Website: yorkshirecontemporary.org

The Tetley was a contemporary art gallery in Leeds, England, located in the art deco headquarters of the former Tetley's Brewery. The gallery was opened on Friday 28 November 2013 and closed on 17 December 2023. The charity running it, named Project Space Leeds (from a project which ran from 2006 to 2012) has now rebranded as Yorkshire Contemporary.

== Background ==
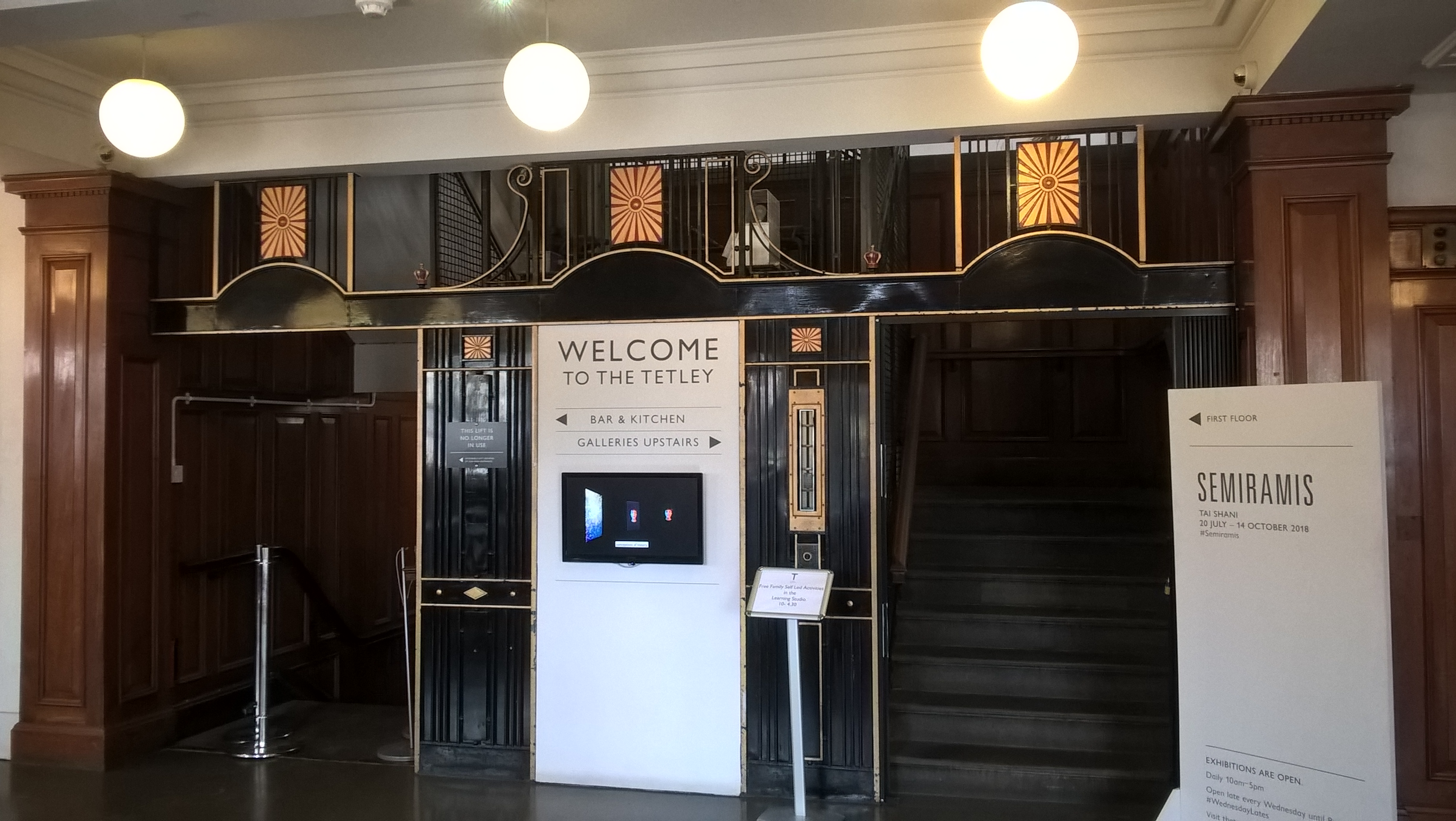
Welcome to the Tetley

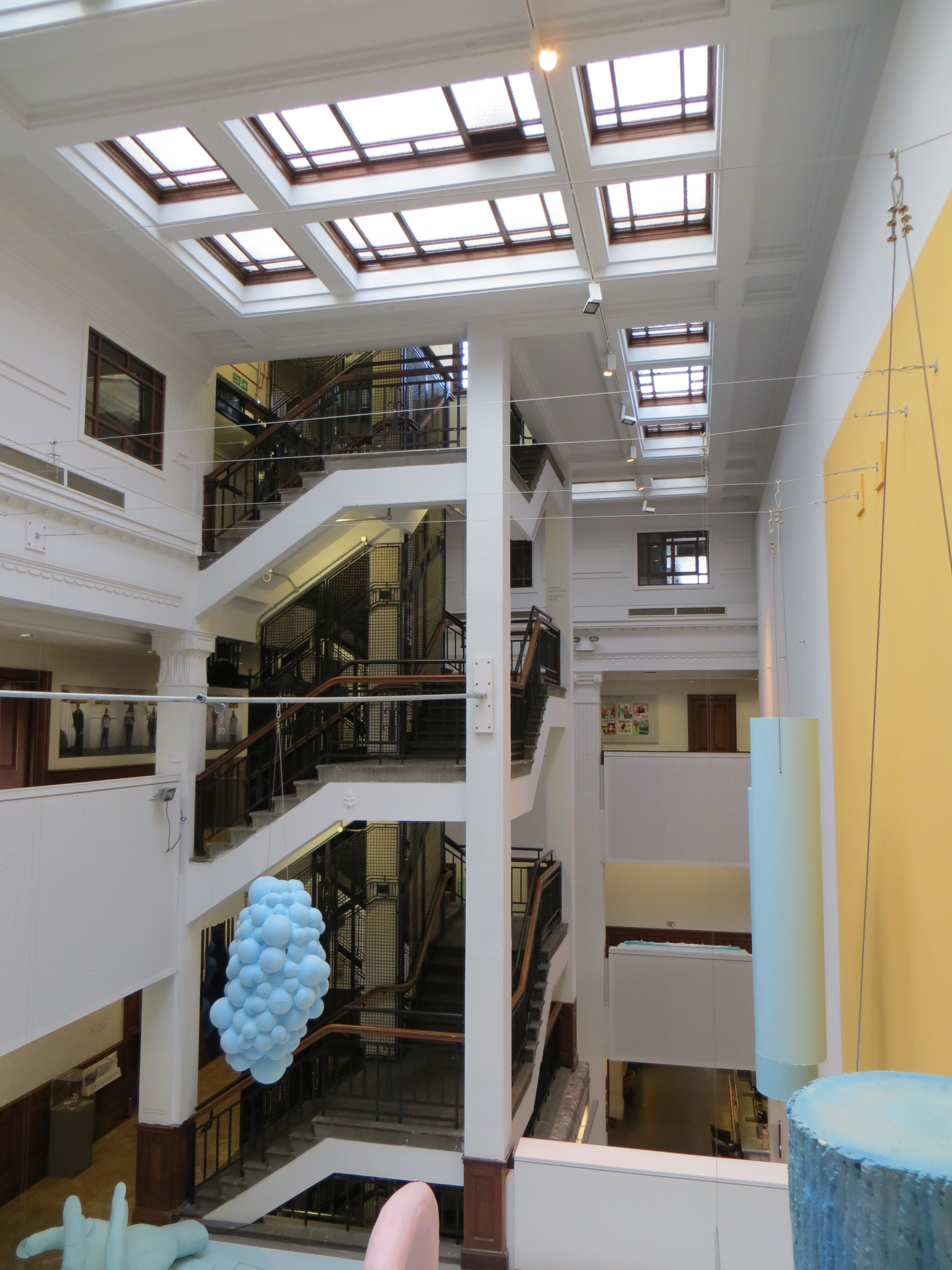
Interior showing Art Deco style

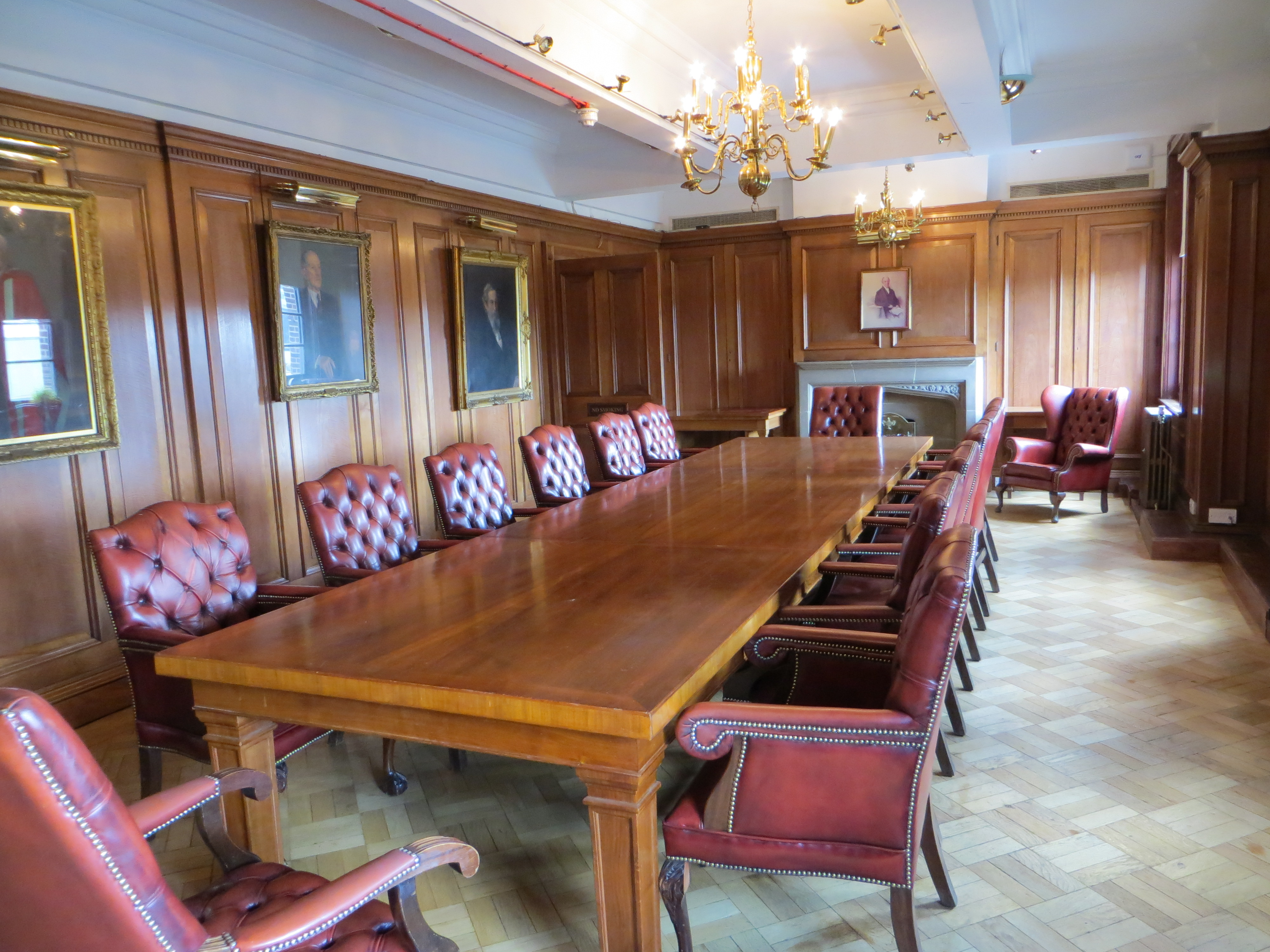
The company board room, still preserved

The gallery's opening was part of a multimillion-pound redevelopment of the former Tetley Brewery site. The owners, Carlsberg-Tetley ended ale and beer production at the site in 2011, demolishing all but the headquarters.

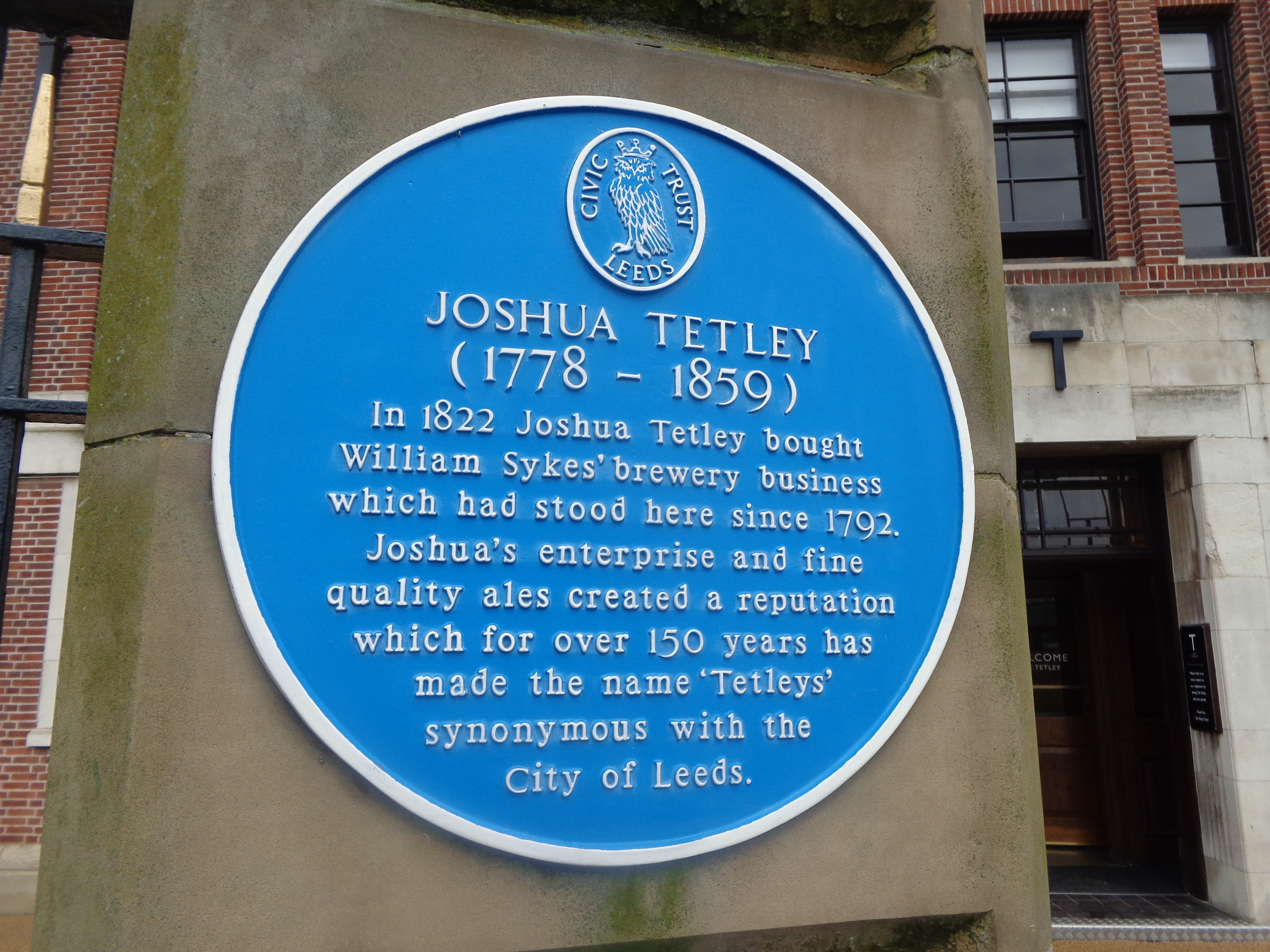
Blue plaque, the Tetley, Leeds (19 July 2014)

This building was retained to provide commercial office space and, in 2013, space to rehouse an existing contemporary artist-led space and registered charity, Project Space Leeds. Upon its move, the charity began operating as 'The Tetley'. The charity took on the specific brief of operating as a Leeds-equivalent to the Cornerhouse in Manchester and Baltic Centre for Contemporary Art in Gateshead.

The refurbishment of the building for the arts centre was overseen by the co-directors of Project Space Leeds, Pippa Hale and Kerry Harker, and Chris Walker of Esh Construction, with partial funding from the Arts Council England.

In January 2016 Bryony Bond, a former curator at the Whitworth Art Gallery in Manchester was appointed the new Creative Director of The Tetley.

The Tetley art space had a lease on the building until 2023.

Aire Park, a 24-acre mixed-use development which includes an 8-acre public park, is now being planned for the site surrounding the Tetley as part of the regeneration of the South Bank of Leeds.

In March 2024, Aire Park announced Kirkstall Brewery would be taking on the building. Kirkstall Brewery plan to focus on renewing the site's status as "a landmark of Yorkshire beer culture."

No longer leasing the Tetley building, the arts charity rebranded as Yorkshire Contemporary in May 2024, focusing on work in different locations across the region while seeking a new permanent home.

== Programme ==
The gallery was one of Arts Council England's National Portfolio Organisations.

== Exhibitions ==
=== 2013-2016 ===
The Tetley's opening exhibitions involved a number of artists responding to the history and space of the new building under the general title 'A New Reality' (29 November 2013 to 1 July 2014). This included James Clarkson, Emma Rushton, Derek Tyman, Simon Lewandowski, Sam Belinfante and Rehana Zaman. 'Painting in Time' (2015), presented contemporary painting and its relationship to other media, including work by artists such as Yoko Ono, Natasha Kidd, Claire Ashley, Jessica Warboys and Polly Appleborn.

An exhibition staged at the Tetley in 2016 recreated a controversial exhibition by the Cypriot artist Stass Paraskos, originally held in Leeds in 1966. Entitled 'Lovers and Romances' the original show at the Leeds Institute Gallery was closed down by the police and the artist charged with displaying obscene and corrupting images under the Vagrancy Acts of 1824 and 1838. The exhibition at the Tetley marked the fiftieth anniversary of the original Paraskos Trial.

Also in 2016, the Tetley staged a solo exhibition of work by the London-based sculptor Jonathan Trayte, comprising vegetables and fruits made of ceramic and other sculptural materials, entitled 'Polyculture'.
