= Merrion Street Gardens =

City square in Leeds, UK

Merion Street Gardens
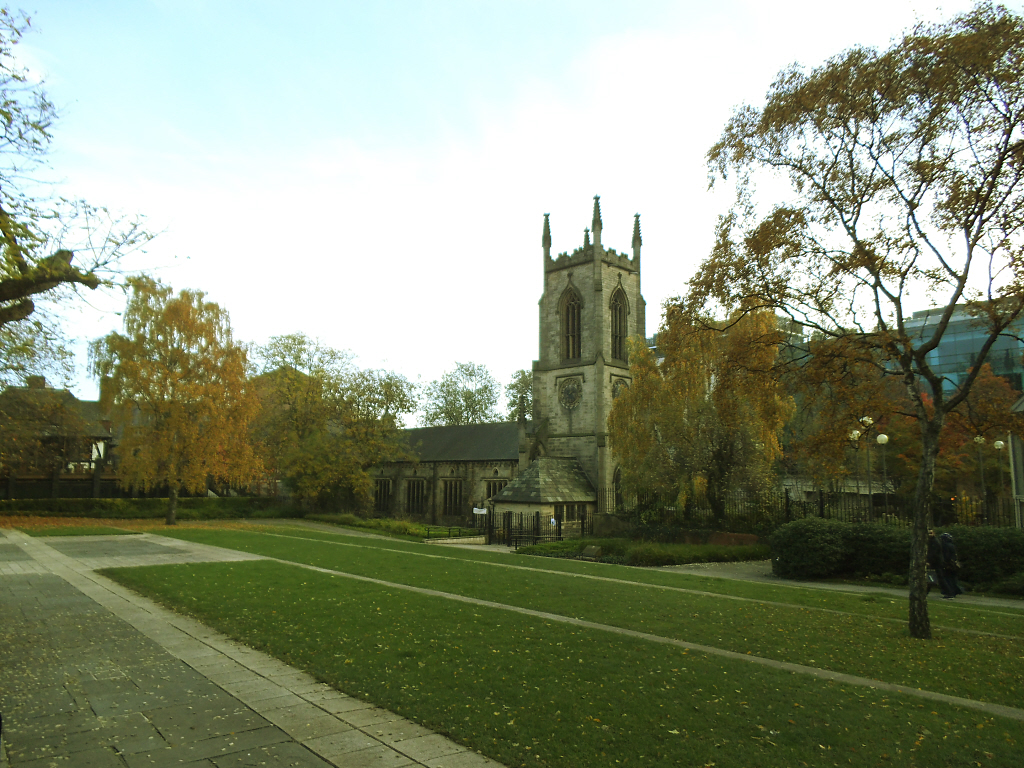
- Merrion Street Gardens and St John's church
- Location: Leeds, West Yorkshire
- OS grid: SE 30213 33897
- Coordinates: 53.8005°N 1.5428°W
- Area: 0.75 acres (3,000 m^{2})
- Operator: Leeds City Council
- Open: 1932
- Awards: Landscape Award, 2006

Merrion Street Gardens, also known as Merrion Gardens of Rest, is a city square and gardens in central Leeds, United Kingdom. It is adjacent to St John's Church, the oldest surviving church in the city.

The square is owned by Wade's Charity and was opened to the public in 1932. It is leased to and maintained by Leeds City Council.

Merrion Street Gardens was renovated in 2006, due to vandalism making the park unsuitable for visitors, at a cost of £450,000.
