= Leeds 13 =

English artist collective

- Formation: 1997–98
- Founded at: University of Leeds
- Defunct: 2000
- Type: Artist collective
- Location: Leeds, England
- Members: 11–15
- Affiliations: Conceptual art
- Website: leeds13.pbworks.com

Leeds 13 was an English artist collective formed in 1997–98 at the University of Leeds in West Yorkshire. All the third-year BA (Fine Art) students were members: nine women and four men. The degree consisted of art history/theory and studio practice. For studio practice, each student was expected to produce original artwork for an end-of-year exhibition. The members of the group rejected this convention. Instead, they cooperated on two conceptual works which both proved controversial and received the top grade.

Going Places (1998), the group's first and best known work, provoked public debate on contemporary art. Members of the group secured donations towards mounting the end-of-year exhibition. They then appeared to take a week's holiday on the Spanish Costa del Sol (English: Sun Coast) supposedly paid for with the donations. The trip was claimed to be art and the arrival back in the UK, witnessed by guests including their tutor, was the exhibition. First published in a student newspaper, the holiday story was widely covered by news media over the next few days. A member of the group was then interviewed on BBC national radio news. He revealed that the holiday had been an elaborate simulation and the donations had not been spent. The hoax was covered as both news and entertainment. All the members of Leeds 13 received first class for their third year.

The Degree Show (1999) examined art exhibitions. Leeds 13 curated and mounted a corporate-style exhibition with a diverse collection of work by other artists worth a total of £1 million. The final-year art students's claim that the show was a group artwork proved controversial. The exhibition was covered by some newspapers, most of whom had been hoaxed by Going Places. All the members of Leeds 13 graduated with first class degrees, and most continued working together. However, later works attracted little media coverage. Leeds 13 was last active in Paris in mid-2000.

Leeds 13 "... [tried] to counter the traditional notion of the artist as an individual creator of specific objects.", according to the artist's statement for The Degree Show. In contrast, its members worked as a group producing one-off events to defy the art market.

== Going Places (1998) ==
In the academic year 1997–98, there were 13 third-year fine art students at the University of Leeds: nine women and four men. The degree had two parts, which were marked with equal weight: art history/theory and studio practice. For studio practice, the students decided to work together as a group. Their tutor was artist Terry Atkinson. According to an art history assessment of the group, Atkinson's anti-pedagogy and his emphasis on the practice of art rather than the aesthetic objects produced were key influences.

=== Concept ===
The project brief was "come up with something thought-provoking", according to Martin Wainwright in The Guardian newspaper. The students aimed to start a public debate on the nature of art, particularly the boundaries between activities acceptable as art and those that were not. They designed a work to attract interest from the media who they hoped would distribute news of the work to the public. To be newsworthy, it had to be controversial.

The controversies were choosing an activity not generally accepted as art and the students's willingness to deceive others. They would pitch a conventional end-of-year art exhibition and ask for financial donations to mount the show. The students would then appear to take a week-long package holiday on the Costa del Sol. On their return, they would claim that they had made art and the exhibition out of themselves and their trip. Journalists would be told that the donations had been spent on the holiday, so the group would be accused of misusing donors's money. Later, the reality would be revealed, the holiday had been a simulation and the donations had not been spent. By removing the misuse of donations controversy, the students hoped the public would reconsider their preconceptions of art and artists.

If the work provoked public debate on the nature of art then the students would consider it a success. They called their project Going Places.

=== Preparation ===
The students applied to their representative body, Leeds University Union, for money to mount an exhibition. They were granted £1,126. The only business sponsor, later mentioned in media coverage, was a Leeds art shop owner who donated £50.

Evidence for the holiday included a performance art event, stories, props and suntans. The group's supposed return from Spain would be staged at the local international airport for invited guests. The students convinced the airport authorities to simulate a flight from Málaga on the announcement boards then let them exit arrivals. The guests would gather in a Spanish-themed art space before the event at the airport.

The students would claim to have spent six days swimming, sunbathing and enjoying the nightlife on the Mediterranean coast. They forged airline tickets, baggage labels, and the frank on a postcard apparently sent from Spain to their tutor. Spanish-themed props were collected to use as souvenirs. They also added local colour to a set of photographs supposedly taken on their holiday. Beach shots were actually taken on the North Sea coast at Cayton Sands, Scarborough, North Yorkshire. Pool shots were taken at a private open-air swimming pool in Chapel Allerton, Leeds. A blue lens effect gave the photographs a Mediterranean look. Other backdrops included bars in Leeds and a Gaudíesque mural at a Spanish-themed nightclub in Cayton Bay.

In the week before the event, the group hid in their student accommodation to use a suntanning bed and fake tan. They built up a skin tone that they later critiqued as "... (perhaps a shade too orange) ...", in the Going Places artist's statement published by The Guardian.

=== Holiday and response ===
On the evening of 6 May 1998, around 60 guests, including Atkinson and head of department Ken Hay, arrived at East Street Studios, Leeds. They found recorded flamenco music playing and sangria to drink but no artwork or students. After half an hour, an air stewardess appeared and led the guests to a bus that took them to Leeds Bradford Airport. There they witnessed the students arriving back from their holiday. The students told the guests the holiday story, invited them to the airport bar and, after a couple of hours, paid the bill with the last of the donations. With 13 spokespeople to tell the story, the group waited for interest from the media.

The holiday story spread across campus to the Leeds Student newspaper whose journalists interviewed members of the group. On Friday 15 May, Leeds Student ran "Con Artists' Spanish Rip-Off" on the front page continuing inside with "And They Call This Art?" Two days later, the national Sunday Mirror newspaper picked up the story. Regional newspapers the Yorkshire Post and Yorkshire Evening Post followed on Monday. By the morning of Tuesday 19 May, when the hoax was revealed, the holiday story was on television and radio, and in national morning newspapers including the Daily Express, Daily Mail, The Daily Telegraph, The Guardian and The Times. Details of the story varied between sources. (Note: The most widely published variant of the Going Places holiday story was: Donations: £1,126 grant from Leeds University Union, often rounded to £1,000; £50 sponsorship from the Leeds art shop owner was usually mentioned; Costs: 13 package holidays; drinks at the airport bar for the students and their guests were sometimes mentioned; Destination: Estepona in the province of Málaga on the Costa del Sol; Duration: one week, six days or nights; The name of the destination was misspelled as Estrepona. The art space for the prelude, East Street Studios, was misstated as: Leeds Art gallery; East Leeds Gallery; On the morning the hoax was revealed, some sources gave higher amounts of donations and the cost of the holiday per person, but each source had different figures.)

Newspaper reports covered both support for and objections to Going Places. In support, the students told The Daily Telegraph they aimed "... to force people to discuss whether there was any limit on what could be described as art." They continued explaining the holiday with "This is leisure as art." and "It is art and it was an exhibition." Atkinson said "It was quite a coup de théâtre. They were lucky because the plane could have been 12 hours late." to the Yorkshire Post. And he told The Times "It's definitely art, but whether it's good or bad art is another thing." A university spokesman was neutral on what the students had done but positive about the value for money they had achieved. The objections were later summarised as "... indignation at the cheek of lazy students declaring that their holiday was an artwork, and moral outrage over the misappropriation of funds." by curator Ralph Rugoff in Frieze magazine.

Some newspapers also ran opinion pieces on the holiday as art. Leeds Student said it was neither creative nor original because millions of people take package holidays every year. Using the group as the latest example, the Yorkshire Evening Post condemned modern artists as more skilled at self-promotion than producing aesthetic objects. The Daily Telegraph contrasted Atkinson's opinion with those of two art critics. Brian Sewell said "Of course it's not art. But it may be they don't believe a word of what they are being taught and are taking it to its logical conclusion." Richard Dorment said "This is not a good work of art. It seems to me on the edge of being a hoax and quite a good joke. I think the joke wins."

The students planned to replace the story of the holiday with the reality of the hoax in the next issue of Leeds Student due on 5 June. But they "... decided to confess early when the issue became 'very hot'."

=== Hoax and response ===
On Tuesday 19 May 1998, a member of Leeds 13 appeared on the BBC Radio 4 morning news and current-affairs programme Today. He revealed the holiday was a simulation and the donations had not been spent. Later that day, the Yorkshire Evening Post checked the facts about the group's arrival with a manager at the airport. This confirmed that the arrival had been staged so the holiday was a hoax.

The next day, most newspapers focused on the donations and deceptions. The Yorkshire Evening Post interviewed the art shop owner who said he had suspicions when a member of the group turned down his offer of a £150 discount on framing in favour of £50 cash. Members of the group considered donating the money to charity, but they decided to pay the grant back to Leeds University Union. (Note: No source has been found to confirm what the members of Leeds 13 did with the business sponsorship for Going Places.) The union demanded a letter of apology to the city's students for publication in Leeds Student. The group's members refused, so they were banned from their student representative body.

A few newspapers ran opinion pieces on the hoax as art. Cosmo Landesman, who interviewed members of the group for The Sunday Times newspaper, was sceptical about their "... postmodern prank." He struggled with the students's view that a concept produced by a group should be accepted as art like an aesthetic object produced by an individual. The students responded to Landesman's piece saying he had missed the point. On 27 June, The Guardian published the artist's statement for Going Places attributed to Leeds 13, the first known use of that name in the media. A Leeds Student comment section editor wrote an open letter criticising Going Places. According to Leeds 13, the letter said their project was a boring and empty sham (the Letters page is missing from the online copy of that issue). The members wrote an exasperated reply, which was published, heavily abridged, in the next issue. They complained about their punishment from Leeds University Union and, having critiqued the letter writer's knowledge of art history and theory, they questioned his authority to judge their work.

Among those who accepted Going Places was art, opinions on whether it was good or interesting were mixed. Atkinson said it was good because it raised issues including the activities acceptable as art and the way media organisations fed off each other. Hay told The Guardian that "[The students] have got everyone talking about the very things—the nature of art and its relationship with life—that lie at the heart of the course." The Guardian's art critic Adrian Searle wrote Going Places was a fantastic work that played with popular preconceptions. At the end of May, The Times Higher Education Supplement published "Talented Artists or Just Con Artists?" As well as Atkinson and Hay, the piece quoted artist John Stezaker who found the fictional trip interesting and deserving of the top grade. However, two lecturers from other universities said Going Places was neither good nor interesting. One said it only showed the mutual dependence of art and media. The other contrasted the students's blatant deceptions to Duchamp's ambiguity about whether his conceptual works were sincere. Both lecturers had concerns about the negative effects of the deceptions on those who had been hoaxed and on the reputation of artists.

As well as news, the hoax was also covered as entertainment on television. The day after the reveal, members of the group appeared on The Big Breakfast. Later that week, panellists on Have I Got News for You were asked about the "Costa del Spoof" (from a headline in The Independent). Germaine Greer was positive saying the project was art and the students should receive A grade. The other three panellists were less enthusiastic. Leeds 13 members summed up Going Places with "During our brief foray into the limelight, we have added greatly to the jollity of the nation."

In July, all the members of Leeds 13 received first class for their third year. According to a BBC News report, "Examiners praised them for challenging popular perceptions about how art is produced, taught and criticised."

Leeds 13's place in art history was explored by Rugoff in the September–October edition of Frieze magazine. Rugoff wrote that Going Places was a "... perfectly executed double whammy." It had provoked "... a minor journalistic frenzy ..." and a public debate on the nature of art but he did not think the results had been illuminating. More interesting was that by distributing news of the work the media had added new facets to it. Rugoff said that Leeds 13, and contemporaries Decima Gallery, were the first artists to make the media their principal medium. He labelled them neo-publicists.

Going Places and its "... media frenzy ..." were mentioned in The Times Higher Education Supplement news highlights of 1998.

=== Exhibitions ===
The Going Places artist's statement said "We have produced no tangible end object for market, ..." A Leeds 13 member explained the art was the impression their work created in people's minds. In spite of this, Going Places featured in three art exhibitions. (Note: In 1999, Decima Gallery wrote that Leeds 13 showed situationist work at Framed, the first exhibition of neo-publicist art, in October 1998. However, no independent source, including the Leeds 13 official website, has been found to confirm this.)

Go Away: Artists and Travel at the Royal College of Art (RCA) Galleries, London ran 17 April – 6 May 1999. Mounted by RCA students on the MA (Visual Arts Administration), the exhibition included works by over thirty artists. Leeds 13 showed Going Places holiday photographs, ephemera and a video of the television coverage.

f.k.a.a. (formerly known as art) at The Wardrobe, Leeds ran 16–18 March 2000 and featured work by local artists. Members of Leeds 13, who graduated the previous year, showed a collection of Going Places artefacts wrapped and priced. These included a bikini top for £69.96, a Frisbee for £110, men's shorts for £80,000 and the holiday photographs in an album for £13 million. A member of the group explained to the Yorkshire Post "It's not really a finished project, it's a processing of the items, that they themselves have become legitimate as art." In his review of the exhibition, Wainwright said the zest of Leeds 13 had attracted others to revitalise visual arts in the city. But he also noted concerns that the group's critique of the art market and its prices was becoming ridiculous. (Note: The last two mentions of Going Places by Wainwright in The Guardian gave holiday destinations other than the Costa del Sol. In 2000, it was the Costa Brava,, while in 2004 it was Benidorm on the Costa Blanca.)

In 2019–2020, an exhibition was mounted to mark 70 years of Fine Art at the University of Leeds. It featured both Going Places and Leeds 13's final student project The Degree Show.

== The Degree Show (1999) ==
The original members of Leeds 13 continued into their fourth and final year. They were joined by two new members, but one original member did not graduate.

=== Concept ===
Members of the group were interested in art exhibitions and two types of relationships in the art world. First, the relationships between works of art that gave each one its significance relative to others. Second, the relationships between art world stakeholders including artists and private sector patrons. The students decided to produce a corporate-style exhibition. It would feature a diverse collection of existing works by other artists as "... conceptual props, ...", according to the artist's statement later published in The Times Higher Education Supplement. They would present the exhibition as a group artwork and call their project The Degree Show.

=== Preparation ===
Members of Leeds 13 secured corporate and local business sponsorship for the exhibition. Property developer Hammerson hosted the show in West Riding House, Leeds. The students also secured works, worth a total of £1 million, by over thirty artists. They included sculpture by Duchamp and Barbara Hepworth, bronze by Rodin and Henry Moore, paintings by Margaret Harrison and Damien Hirst, collage by Kurt Schwitters, a poster by Jeff Koons, photographs by Jo Spence, the BANK fax-back service and performance by Decima Gallery.

Leeds 13 hung, lit and secured the work. They also produced the catalogue, wall labels and advertising. The introductory essay was a collage of art writing. It explained the concept using a Hugh McDiarmid quote "... 'the greater the plagiarism the greater the work of art.' If we can accept this dissident posture we can take this exhibition as a work of art in itself."

=== Response ===
The Degree Show was open to the public 8–18 June 1999. Leeds 13's tutor Ben Read told The Times that students normally showed original work. He continued by asking "Have they made these works their own art?" Read concluded that the exhibition had stimulated debate on the nature of art.

The show was covered in the regional and quality newspapers, most of whom had been hoaxed by Going Places. As the students had not produced original artworks for a second year, questions were asked about what they had been doing. The response to The Degree Show as a group artwork was negative. An art and philosophy lecturer wrote that the work was not good art. In his view, the show failed to critique corporate art exhibitions because it looked exactly like one. Two art critics were quoted in both The Guardian and The Times. Matthew Collings dismissed The Degree Show as "... appropriation art, trendy but moronic." David Lee said it "... confirms the important point that the path to success in modern art is through notoriety. It sounds like a complete abrogation of responsibility as a degree show."

In contrast, the response to The Degree Show as an exhibition was positive. According to a Leeds gallery owner, who lent £140,000 worth of bronze, the mounting of the show was excellent. She also appreciated the inclusion of work by artists with Leeds connections: Hepworth, Hirst and Moore. David Shepherd, who exhibited two paintings, said the show was a good opportunity for the public to view a diverse collection of work. And Read noted it had more visitors than any of the department's previous exhibitions.

The group's members received upper second class for The Degree Show, the studio practice half of their marks. This was added to their individual marks for art history/theory. The day after the show opened, the students received six first and eight upper second class degrees. But seven students appealed saying the examiners had rushed marking The Degree Show before taking industrial action. Their appeal was successful, and by September all 14 members of Leeds 13 had received first class degrees.

== After graduation (late 1999 – 2000) ==
Leeds 13 continued after its members graduated but later works received little media coverage.

A Christmas Pudding for Henry was a multi-artist programme on the culture of Leeds which ran from mid-October to mid-December 1999. According to the Leeds 13 official website, the group participated and produced Floiner (1999), but no independent source has been found to confirm this.

In March 2000, Leeds 13 revisited Going Places at the f.k.a.a. exhibition.

By May 2000, 11 members of the group were in Paris promoting the Batofar cultural centre and restaurant as artists-in-residence. They staged playful interventions in formal spaces: the Louvre and the National Library. According to the official website, Leeds 13 also produced A Play on Grass (2000), which appears to be its final work. Again, no independent source has been found to confirm this.

== Continuing response ==
A BBC Introduction to Modern and Contemporary Art by Paul Glinkowski was published in 2000. Glinkowski wrote that Going Places was "... possibly the most outrageous game in British art history." He categorised the work as challenging both the rules and the rulers of the art world.

Going Places was the first example of simulation in art critic John A. Walker's book Art in the Age of the Mass Media (3rd ed.) published in 2001. Walker wrote the work was a prank by the student artists to pay the media back for their barbed coverage of contemporary art. He mentioned The Degree Show in passing. Walker suggested alternative careers for the by-then-graduate artists in public relations or journalism.

In 2009, RTÉ Radio 1 broadcast Grand Art in The Curious Ear series of documentaries, which covered Going Places as one of two performance artworks from the late 1990s costing around £1,000. A member of Leeds 13 explained how the work unfolded then how it was produced.

Beating the Bounds was a 2013 Reith Lecture by artist Grayson Perry on BBC Radio 4. The lecture examined the idea that anything could be art. Perry used Going Places as an example and hoped the work was a parody of that idea. (Note: According to Perry (2013), the Going Places photographs were taken in Skegness not Scarborough.)

Seventy years of Fine Art at the University of Leeds was marked by an exhibition which ran 4 December 2019 – 4 April 2020. Leeds 13 showed a video on Going Places and a catalogue from The Degree Show. The exhibition was co-curated by Griselda Pollock an art historian with the university. In the studio guide, Pollock focused on the radical anti-pedagogical and feminist aspects of the group and its works. (Note: Pollock (2020) contained a number of variants of the Leeds 13 student projects. These included the Going Places holiday was two weeks not one and the name of the last exhibition was The Final Degree then The Final Degree Show not The Degree Show. Pollock was assisted by two members of Leeds 13. In 2000, one of those members told the Yorkshire Post that Going Places was "... not really a finished project, ..." and the group said they "... still admit to being fairly good at telling fibs.")
