= School is Dead =

1971 book by Everett Reimer

- Author: Everett Reimer
- Language: English
- Publication date: 1971
- ISBN: 9780140801699

School is Dead: An Essay on Alternatives in Education is a book written by Everett Reimer, published in 1971. In this work, the author critically examines the educational system and proposes an alternative vision for education. The book has been translated into several languages, including French, German, Spanish, and Italian.

== Overview ==
Reimer challenges conventional education methods in School is Dead and advocates for a more student-centered and flexible approach. He argues that the traditional school system, which emphasizes standardized curriculum, grading, and hierarchical structure, is outdated and does not effectively address the diverse needs of students.

According to Reimer, genuine learning occurs beyond the confines of the traditional classroom. He encourages a shift towards alternative forms of education that acknowledge and nurture individual talents and interests. Reimer promotes the idea that education should be a lifelong, self-directed process, and he suggests that the rigid structure of schools hinders creativity and personal development.

Critics argue that Reimer's vision for alternative education is utopian and impractical in the real world. They claim he overlooks the value of structured learning and oversimplifies complex issues like social inequality. The lack of specific alternatives with clear details in his proposals is also criticized. Published in 1971, the book's historical context is emphasized, with critics noting that some arguments may not be relevant today due to changes in educational practices and society.

While School is Dead may be considered provocative and controversial, it has influenced discussions on education reform and alternative learning approaches. Reimer's work has contributed to ongoing debates about the best ways to prepare individuals for the challenges of the modern world. It's important to note that opinions on Reimer's ideas vary, and the book remains a topic of discussion within educational circles.

== See also ==
- Antipedagogy
- Criticism of schooling
- Anarchism and education
