= Indianerkommune =

Historical German Pedophile Advocacy Organization

The Indianerkommune (lit. "Native American Commune") was an antipedagogically oriented commune in which pedophilic adults lived together with children (mostly street children). It was founded in the 1970s in Heidelberg and was based in Nuremberg from 1977; successor organizations still existed in 2013. The ideas of the Indianerkommune were supported by a large part of the radical left of the time and temporarily influenced the children's and youth policy programme of the Greens party.

== Etymology ==
The members of the commune called themselves "Indianers", not to be confused with Indians, after the threatened indigenous peoples of the United States and understood themselves as a "tribe" threatened by mainstream society.

== Demands ==
The Indianerkommune was antipedagogically oriented and demanded the abolition of the upbringing of children and young people. Individual aspects of their catalogue of demands included the repeal of Sections 173 to 176 and 180 of the German Criminal Code (i.e. sexual intercourse between relatives, sexual abuse of minors in care (germany), homosexual acts, child sexual abuse, promotion of sexual acts by minors (germany)), a right for children to divorce their parents, the abolition of children's and youth homes and closed child and adolescent psychiatric facilities, a ban on all violence against children and young people, and the abolition of compulsory education.

== History ==
The Indianerkommune emerged in 1970s Heidelberg in the milieu of the Socialist Patients' Collective, from which it adopted anti-psychiatric demands. It described itself as an association of "several young people and adults with the same ideas about love, life and survival". The leader of the commune was former student Uli Reschke, whom die tageszeitung described in 1984 as having an "authoritarian manner as well as a pedophilic inclination". Following the demolition of the house it had occupied on Heidelberg's Hauptstrasse, the commune moved in 1977 to the Gostenhof district of Nuremberg.

In 1980, the majority of the female members left the Indianerkommune and founded the explicitly female Oranienstraßen-Kommune in Berlin, from which the Kanalratten commune emerged in 1983, also cooperating with the Indianerkommune.

In the early 1980s, a police search of the Indianerkommune's premises yielded an address card index containing approximately 2,000 entries. This served "primarily as a mailing list for the commune's own publications, above all the 'Rundbrief der Indianerkommune' [circular letter]", but also "as a kind of accommodation exchange", in which "pedophilic men had also registered their addresses".

The real tragedy of what happened lies in the fact that for some young people there were only these alternatives: life in a home or a family in which they were subjected to permanent violence; shelter in a tendentially boundary-violating and sexualised environment; or life on the street. To this day, little has changed in this situation.

— Jan-Henrik Friedrichs, Die Indianerkommune Nürnberg. p. 259

According to Christian Füller (journalist), the Indianerkommune used this address card index to serve as a central distribution function for young people seeking protection within the pedophile scene.

In 1981, criminal proceedings were initiated against Reschke on suspicion of child sexual abuse; Reschke was imprisoned for thirteen and a half months and was acquitted on appeal after the juvenile witnesses had partially retracted their original statements. In Tübingen, Reschke was convicted in 1985 along with other defendants, including a member of the Greens, of child abduction and given a suspended sentence.

=== Political activities ===
The Indianerkommune was active in the gay, anti-nuclear and alternative movements, where it was feared for its disruptive appearances. In the International Year of the Child 1979, members of the Indianerkommune staged a hunger strike.Organisation members occupied the editorial offices of die tageszeitung on several occasions in order to force the publication of their demands.

=== Influence on the Greens ===
The Indianerkommune, founded in the 1970s by the later Greens member Uli Reschke, exerted influence on the party's programme during the founding phase of the Greens. Although the commune failed in this effort at the Greens' founding congress on 13 January 1980, it claimed in a leaflet to have written the section on "children and young people" in the first party programme; this section was adopted by a large majority at the Greens' federal assembly on 22 June 1980. Werner Vogel (politician), who was elected to the Bundestag for the Greens in 1983 but did not take up his seat, supported the Indianerkommune's concerns within the party in 1982. In autumn 1983, young members of the Indianerkommune temporarily occupied the Greens' federal headquarters in Bonn. Groups from the Indianerkommune disrupted Greens party conferences to spread their demands for decriminalised sexual contact between children and adults, including the Greens' state party conference in North Rhine-Westphalia in 1985.

This influence on the Greens was again discussed in the press in 2013, in the context of the pedophilia debate in the Alliance 90/The Greens.

=== Successor organisations ===
In 2013, former members were active in the "Anti-Kinderklau Aktionsbündnis Kinderrecht" (AKKAK), in the "Forum for anarchist children and youth politics", in the "Jugendselbsthilfe Nürnberg" (Nuremberg Youth Self-Help), and in a bicycle shop. Their activities were monitored by the child protection and youth protection department of the Nuremberg Youth Welfare Office and by the Kinderschutzbund (German Child Protection Association) Nuremberg.

== See also ==
- List of pedophile activist organizations
