= Culture of Leeds =

Leeds is known for its culture in the fields of art, architecture, music, sport, film and television. As the largest city in Yorkshire, Leeds is a centre of Yorkshire's contemporary culture and is the base for Yorkshire's television (BBC, ITV, and Channel 4) and regional newspapers.

In 2015 Leeds announced its intention to bid for European Capital of Culture 2023. Following the European Commission's decision for the UK to no longer able to bid to be part of the European Capital of Culture Competition, the City Council, along with partners, committed to a five-year cultural investment programme culminating in Leeds 2023, a year of cultural celebration.

== Art ==
Leeds produced many notable artists and sculptors, including Kenneth Armitage, John Atkinson Grimshaw, Jacob Kramer, Barbara Hepworth, Henry Moore, Edward Wadsworth and Joash Woodrow, and was the centre for a particularly radical strain of British art. Before the First World War Leeds was the home of an unusual modernist arts organisation, called the Leeds Arts Club, founded by Alfred Orage, which lasted from 1903 to 1923. Notable members included Jacob Kramer, Herbert Read, Frank Rutter and Michael Sadler. As well as advocating a radical political agenda, supporting the Suffragettes, the Independent Labour Party and the Fabian Society, and promoting the philosophy of Friedrich Nietzsche, the Leeds Arts Club was almost unique in Britain as being an exponent of German Expressionist ideas about art and culture. As a result, it staged very early British exhibitions of work by European expressionist artists, such as Wassily Kandinsky, showing their work in the city as early as 1913, and produced its own English Expressionist artists, including Jacob Kramer and Bruce Turner.

In the 1920s Leeds College of Art was the starting point for the careers of the sculptors Barbara Hepworth and Henry Moore, and in the 1950s, and 1960s it was one of the leading centres for radical art education in Britain under the guidance of artists such as Harry Thubron and Tom Hudson, and the art historian Norbert Lynton. Their attempts to redefine what art education should mean in the post-Second World War period led the artist Patrick Heron to claim in 1971 in The Guardian newspaper that "Leeds is the most influential art school in Europe since the Bauhaus". This willingness to push at the boundaries of acceptable public behaviour from artists was also evident in 1966 when Leeds College of Art staged an exhibition of paintings by the Cypriot artist Stass Paraskos, who taught at the college, which was raided by the police after allegations of obscenity.

This radicalism continued into the 1970s when the higher education component of Leeds College of Art was split from the college to form the nucleus of the new multidisciplinary Leeds Polytechnic, now called Leeds Beckett University. Performance art had been taught earlier at Leeds College of Art, notably by the Fluxus artist Robin Page during his time as a tutor there in the mid-1960s, but in 1977 a performance art work hit the national news headlines when the students Pete Parkin and Derek Wain used an air pistol to shoot a line up of live budgerigars in front of an audience at Leeds Polytechnic.

The University of Leeds was the alma mater of Herbert Read, one of the leading international theorists of modern art from the mid-twentieth century, and also the teaching base for the Marxist art historian Arnold Hauser from 1951 to 1985. Partly due to Herbert Read's connection with the university, from 1950 to 1970 the university was the host of one of the first artist-in-residence schemes in Britain, using funding from the then owner of Lund Humphries books, Peter Gregory. The Gregory Fellowships, as the residencies were known, were given to painters and sculptors for up to two years to allow them to develop their own work and influence the university in any way they saw fit. Amongst those holding the fellowships were Kenneth Armitage, Reg Butler, Dennis Creffield and Terry Frost and others. Parallel Gregory Fellowships also existed in music and poetry at the university.

Leeds was also a centre for radical feminist art, with one of the first galleries in Britain dedicated to showing the work of women photographers, the Pavilion Gallery, opening in the city in 1983, and the University of Leeds School of Fine Art being a well-known centre for the development of feminist art history, under Griselda Pollock, during the 1980s and 1990s. Possibly as a result of the strength of feminist art in Leeds, in November 1984 an exhibition of ceramics by students and staff at Leeds Polytechnic was attacked by a group of feminist activists who destroyed eight sculptures on display which they deemed to be degrading to women. The University of Leeds's School of Fine Art also specialised in Art & Language conceptual art practice, under Terry Atkinson, again in the 1980s and 1990s. Atkinson tutored the Leeds 13 year group that, in 1998, provoked a national media frenzy with their Spanish holiday as art hoax.

A major sculpture research centre and gallery, the Henry Moore Institute, is located alongside Leeds Art Gallery in the city centre, and in 2013 a new contemporary art centre, called The Tetley, opened on the site of the former Tetley Brewery to the south of the city centre.

In March 2017, The Times voted Leeds as the number one cultural place to live in Britain. This was ahead of London, Birmingham, St Ives, Stratford-upon-Avon and Cheltenham. The citation notes that Leeds has Opera North, the Northern Ballet, and the Leeds Playhouse amongst many other attractions that ranked it at number one.

=== Art galleries ===
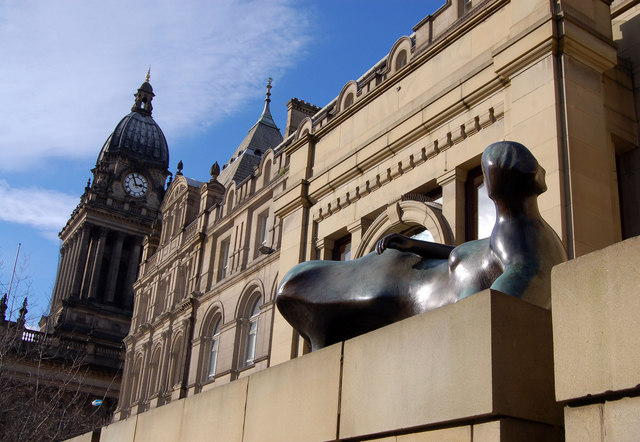
Henry Moore Statue outside Leeds Art Gallery

Art practice and collecting has a long history in Leeds: the city's municipal art gallery (Leeds Art Gallery) opened in 1888. J. M. W. Turner painted numerous scenes in and around the city, and the city was home to one of Britain's largest collections of Pre-Raphaelite Art, owned by Thomas Plint, during the nineteenth century. There was also an early history of holding large-scale public exhibitions in the city, most notably the series of 'Polytechnic Exhibitions' held regularly from 1839.

Leeds Art Gallery houses important collections of traditional and contemporary British art, with the best twentieth century collection outside London and a colourful wall painting for the Victorian staircase by Lothar Götz. Just next door, The Henry Moore Institute is dedicated to celebrating sculpture. In the iconic building, they host a year-round changing programme of historical, modern and contemporary exhibitions presenting sculpture from across the world. Located in the striking art deco headquarters of the former brewery, The Tetley is a centre for contemporary art, centred on creativity, innovation and experimentation. There is also an art gallery within the Mansion Conservatory in Roundhay Park.

== Architecture ==
Leeds has a variety of architectural styles, including a great deal of Victorian architecture, which developed during Leeds' rapid growth through the Industrial Revolution. Notable architecture from this era includes the Leeds Town Hall and the Corn Exchange. Leeds has little in the way of architecture that predates this era; however, examples include St John the Evangelist's church and the ruins of Kirkstall Abbey.

Leeds is famous for its spectacular Victorian arcades – Queens Arcade, Thornton's Arcade, Grand Arcade and the magnificent Victoria Quarter. The centre is also home to a number of iconic buildings: Leeds Civic Hall and Leeds Central Library; a gothic masterpiece with spectacular staircases and archways.

Other notable architectural gems include Europe's largest indoor market: Kirkgate Market, Leeds Grand Theatre and City Varieties.

Leeds also has several examples of notable twentieth-century architecture. This includes the art-deco Queens Hotel and the brutalist Roger Stevens Building at the University of Leeds and formerly the Leeds International Swimming Pool.

== Carnivals ==
Leeds hosts the Leeds West Indian Carnival in its Chapeltown district, which is home to a sizable West Indian community. This takes place each August and is the longest running West Indian carnival in Europe, having taken place since 1967. The 2017 event attracted an estimated 250,000 visitors.

== Festivals ==
Leeds hosts a variety of city-wide cultural festivals which take place across multiple venues. Some include:

- Light Night
- Leeds International Film Festival
- Leeds Palestinian Film Festival
- Scalarama Leeds
- Compass Live Art Festival
- Transform Festival
- Leeds International Festival of Ideas

== Literature ==
Several notable writers and poets have hailed from Leeds, most notably author and screenwriter Alan Bennett. These also included poets Alfred Austin, Tony Harrison and Barry Tebb. Writers from Leeds include Helen Fielding, famous for Bridget Jones's Diary, and Keith Waterhouse, famous for the novel Billy Liar. Tony Harrison described his relationship with the city in his infamous poem "V".

== Museums ==
Leeds has several museums, including one national museum, the Royal Armouries. Other museums include the Leeds City Museum, the Thackray Medical Museum, Leeds Industrial Museum and the Abbey House Museum. Leeds also features the oldest working railway in the world: Middleton Railway.

There are also local museums in Horsforth and Otley displaying exhibits of local historical interest.

== Historic Houses ==
There are number of nearby historical houses within Leeds' boundaries, including Harewood House, Lotherton Hall and Temple Newsam. Only 3 miles out of the city centre you can also find Kirkstall Abbey, one of the most complete medieval 12th century Cistercian Abbeys in Britain.

== Music ==
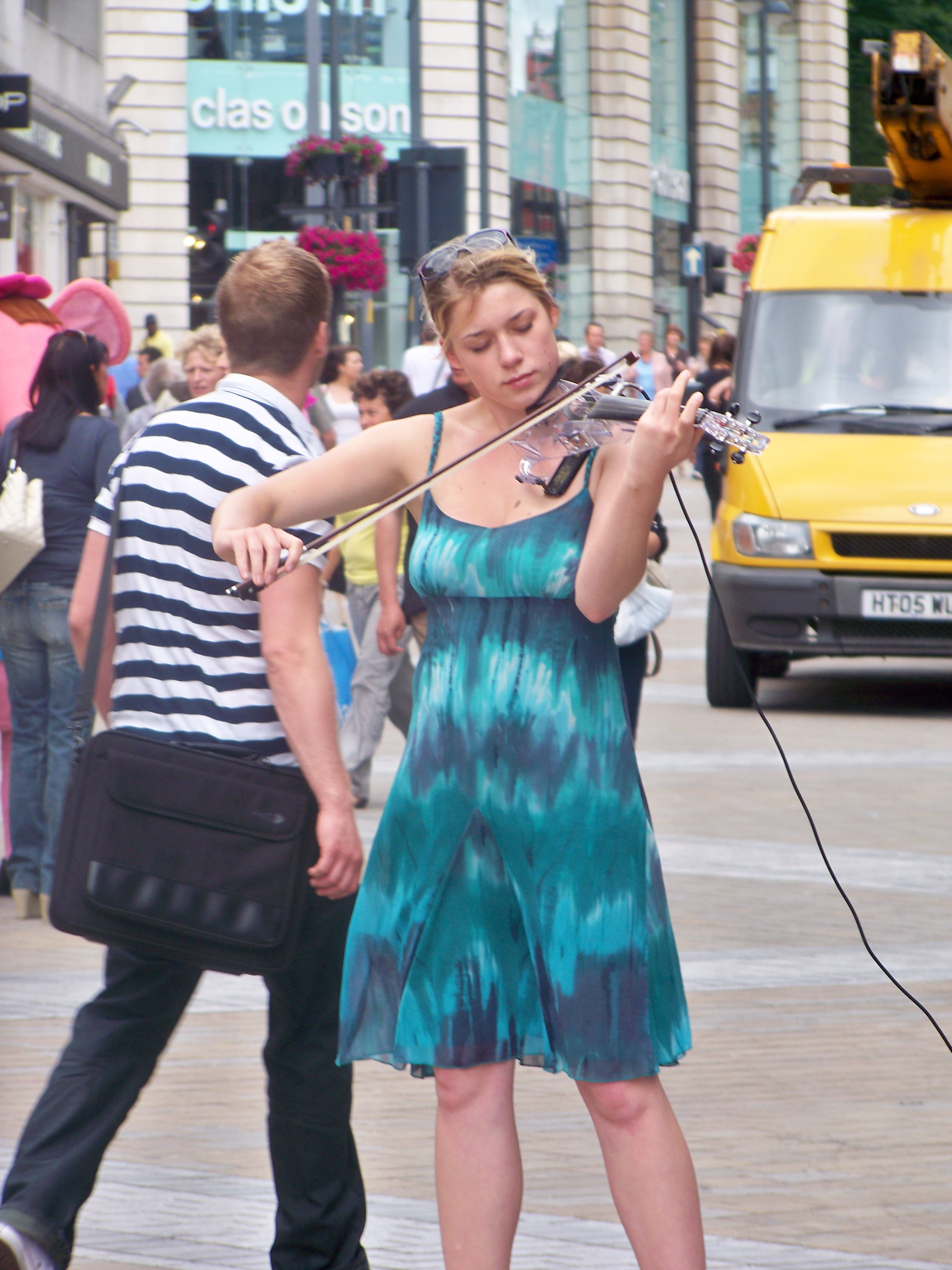
A busker on Briggate

Leeds is home to Opera North, Northern Ballet and The Northern School of Contemporary Dance (NSCD).

The Leeds International Pianoforte Competition is held every year at Leeds Town Hall and the Great Hall at the University of Leeds.

Leeds also has a symphony orchestra.

Leeds has a notable musical scene, and has produced many bands and artists. Bands from Leeds include Chumbawamba, Kaiser Chiefs, the Pigeon Detectives and Soft Cell. Musical artists from Leeds include Corrine Bailey Rae and Mel B.

Leeds has several music venues, including the O2 Academy, the City Varieties, and the 13,500 capacity, entertainment focused Leeds Arena. Leeds Town Hall and the Leeds University Students' Union host concerts, and a smaller venue is also in operation at Leeds Met Students' Union.

=== Music festivals ===
Leeds has been home to several music festivals throughout the years; these include Party in the Park and Leeds Festival. Leeds Festival has run at Temple Newsam and Bramham Park since 1999. The Leeds Classical Music Festival ran from 1858 until 1985.

== Theatre and performances ==
Leeds is one of the only English cities outside London to have its own repertory theatre, opera and ballet companies. Leeds has some of the finest theatres in the UK and offers a wide range of entertainment, from music hall evenings and pantos at the City Varieties, to West End plays and musicals at Leeds Playhouse and Leeds Grand Theatre. Leeds is also home to the internationally renowned and award-winning Opera North and Northern Ballet.

During the summer, open air performances take place at locations such as Harewood House and Kirkstall Abbey and the Summer Series on Millennium Square.

Playwright Alan Bennett hails from the city and many of his plays including his televised Talking Heads were set in Leeds or areas surrounding the city.

For film, there is the historic Cottage Road Cinema, one of the oldest cinemas in the country, or Grade II listed Hyde Park Picture House: believed to be the only one in the world still lit by gas.

== Sport ==
Leeds has teams representing all the major national sports. Leeds United A.F.C. is the city's main football club. Leeds Rhinos (Rugby league), Leeds Tykes (Rugby Union) and Yorkshire County Cricket Club are also based in the city.

Leeds is well known for hosting world-class sporting events, with unforgettable, international competitions being held in the city, including the Grand Départ of the Tour de France in 2014, Rugby World Cup 2015 and the ITU World Triathlon Series Leeds in 2016, 2017, 2018.

=== Football ===
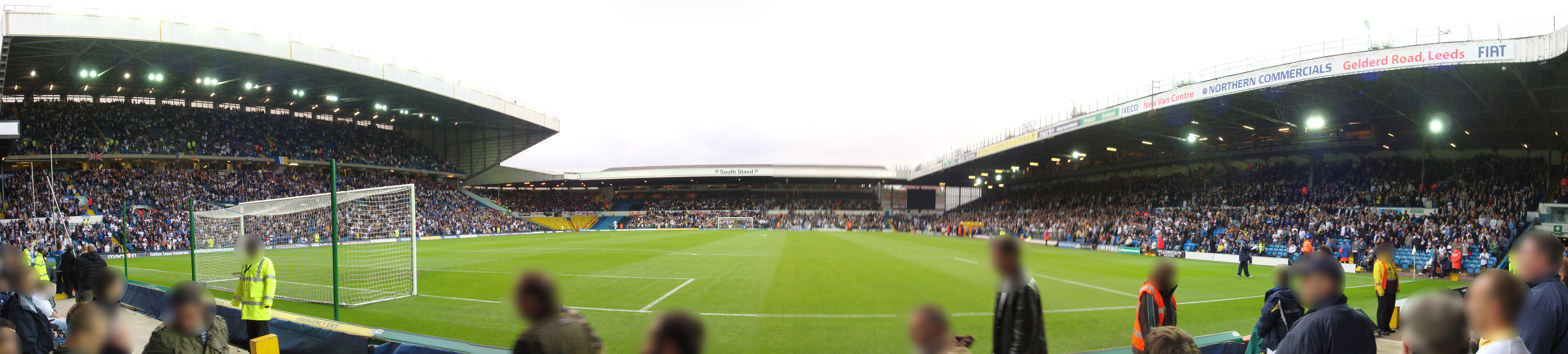
Elland Road, the city's main football stadium

Leeds United are the only professional side in the city since Farsley Celtic folded in 2010. Formed in 1919 they play at Elland Road and currently compete in the Premier League.

Other smaller teams include Garforth Town and Guiseley A.F.C.

=== Rugby league ===
Leeds has two professional Rugby League teams. Leeds Rhinos play at the Headingley Rugby Stadium and compete in the Super League. In South Leeds there is also Hunslet R.L.F.C. There are many other professional Rugby League teams in areas surrounding Leeds.

=== Rugby union ===
The main Rugby Union team in Leeds is Leeds Tykes, who play at The Sycamores in Bramhope, about 9 mi (14 km) outside the city centre. Lying just outside the city sprawl but within the Metropolitan District is Otley R.U.F.C.

=== Cricket ===
Yorkshire County Cricket Club's main ground is the Headingley Cricket Ground, which backs onto the rugby ground.

=== Swimming ===
Leeds has a large Olympic swimming pool situated at the John Charles Centre for Sport, which replaced earlier facilities at the Leeds International Swimming Pool.

== Film and television ==
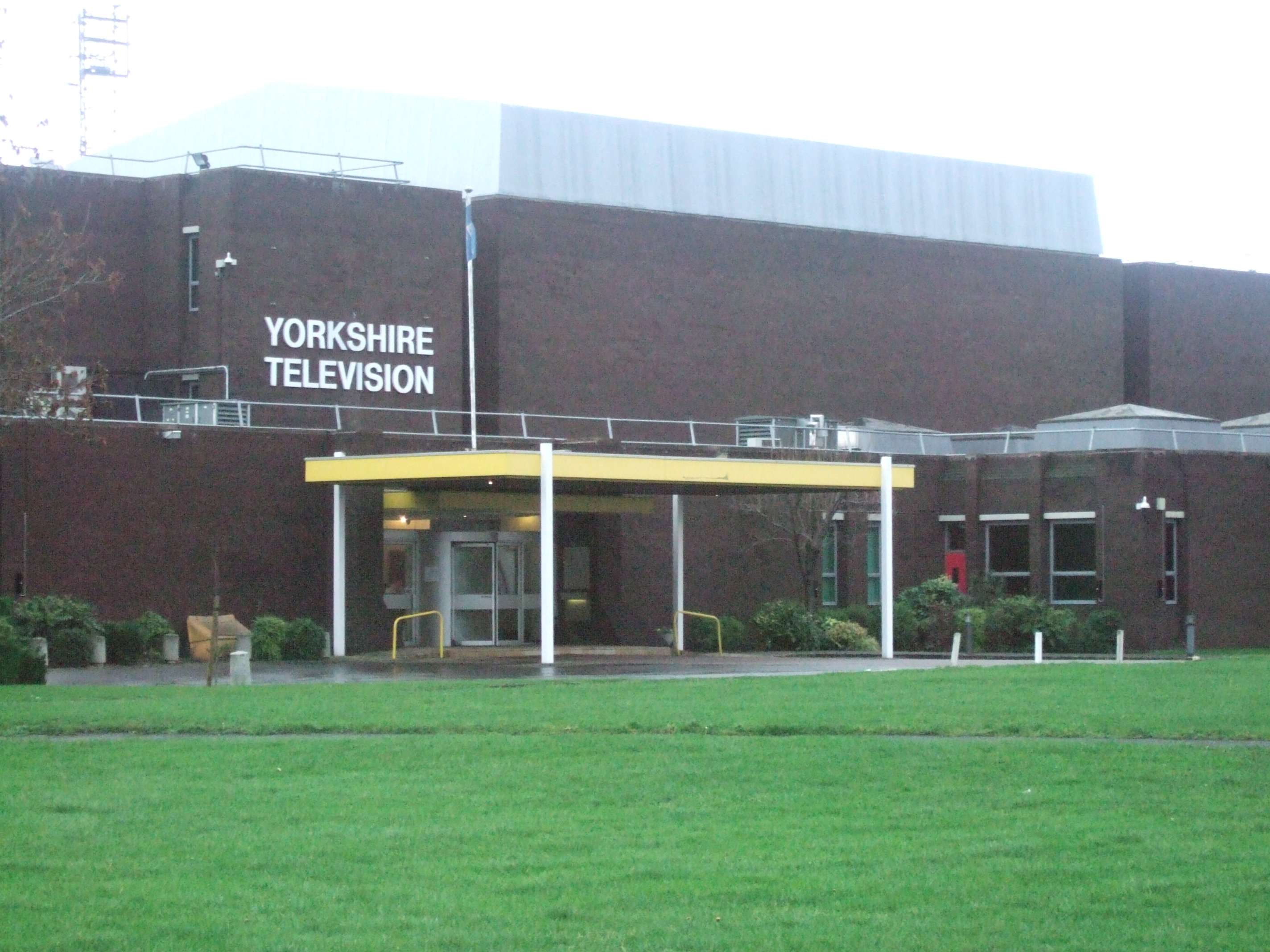
The Leeds Studios, home to Yorkshire Television

Leeds is home to both BBC Yorkshire and ITV Yorkshire (formerly Yorkshire Television). Many television series have been set in Leeds, including At Home with the Braithwaites, The Beiderbecke Trilogy, Fat Friends and Married Single Other. Several films have also been set in the city, such as The Damned United and Mischief Night.
