= Leeds 2023 =

2023 festival in Leeds

LEEDS 2023
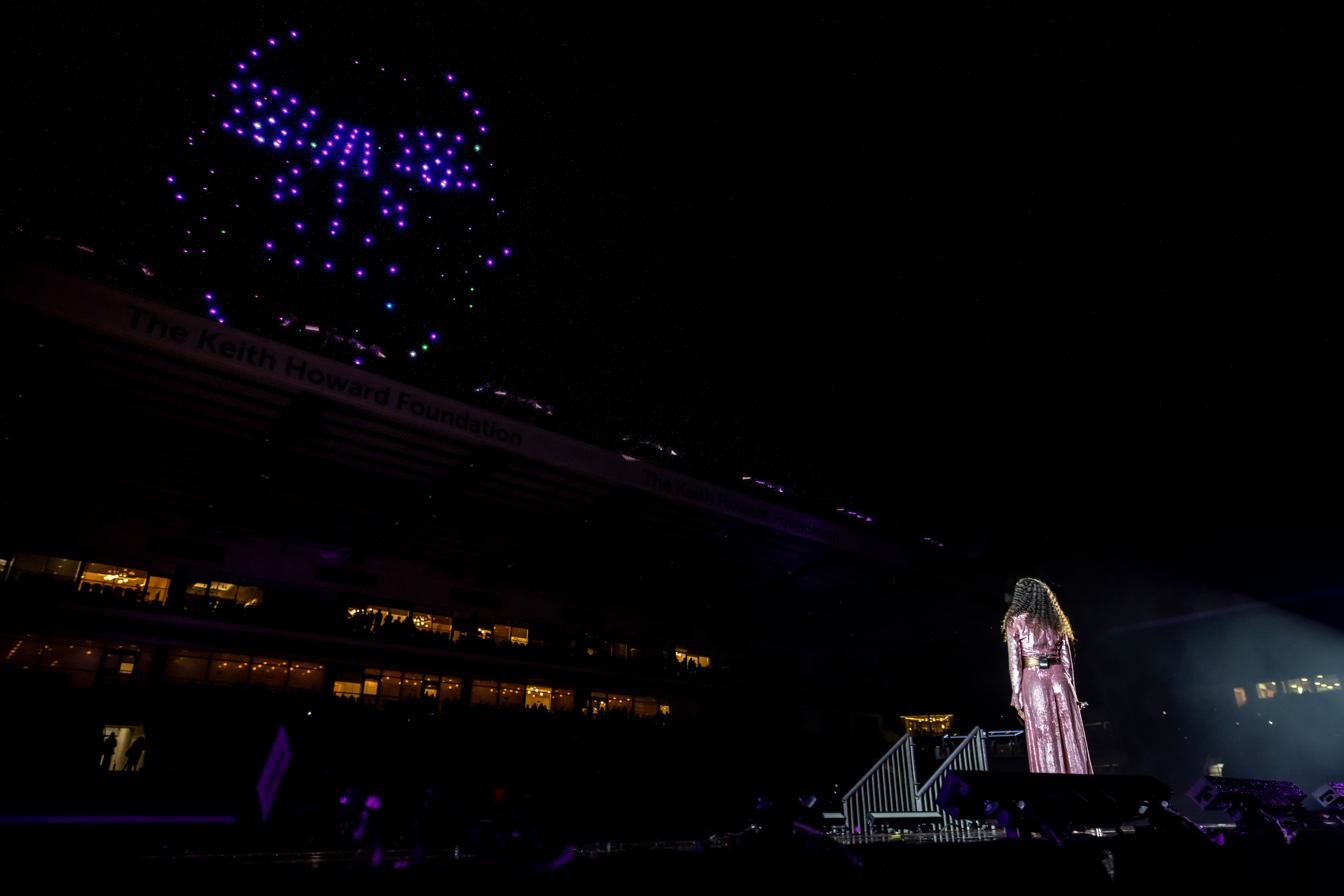
- Time: January to December 2023
- Duration: 1 year
- Type: Unofficial year of culture
- Organized by: Leeds Culture Trust; Leeds City Council
- Website: https://leeds2023.co.uk/

Leeds 2023, stylized as LEEDS 2023, was a designated year of culture taking place in Leeds, West Yorkshire, during 2023. Years of culture are specific years where a city or region dedicates significant resources to investing in cultural initiatives. Initially proposed as a bid to be the host city for European Capital of Culture, post-Brexit exclusion from European Union initiatives meant that Leeds could no longer bid. This resulted in Leeds City Council and partners deciding to run an independent year of culture in 2023.

Leeds Culture Trust, a charity separate to Leeds City Council, was established in 2019 to develop the programme and fund raise for the year of culture. Kully Thiarai was appointed Creative Director in 2019. The year was launched at Headingley Stadium, and was followed by a range of projects in every ward in the city. New performances and public artworks were commissioned, such as Hibiscus Rising by Yinka Shonibare.

== Background ==
Leeds is a city recognised for its cultural offering in the fields of art, architecture, music, sport, film and television. In 2015, after a fourteen-month consultation and a public vote, Leeds City Council (LCC) approved the creation of a bid for the city to the UK's nomination for European Capital of Culture in 2023. On 27 October 2017 the city submitted its proposal for the Department of Culture, Media and Sport (DCMS); the other cities to put in bids were Nottingham, Dundee, Milton Keynes and Belfast.

Leeds' initial proposal cost £800,000: the council invested £145,000 and another £600,000 came from private investment. The proposal included the construction of a lighthouse commemorating John Smeaton on the south bank of the Aire, as well as an extension of the city's Light Night festival. The initial bid proposal was chaired by Sharon Watson, principal of the Northern School of Contemporary Dance, who at the time of the bid was artistic director of Phoenix Dance. The bid team stated that they "aim to develop a 100% local and 100% international programme".

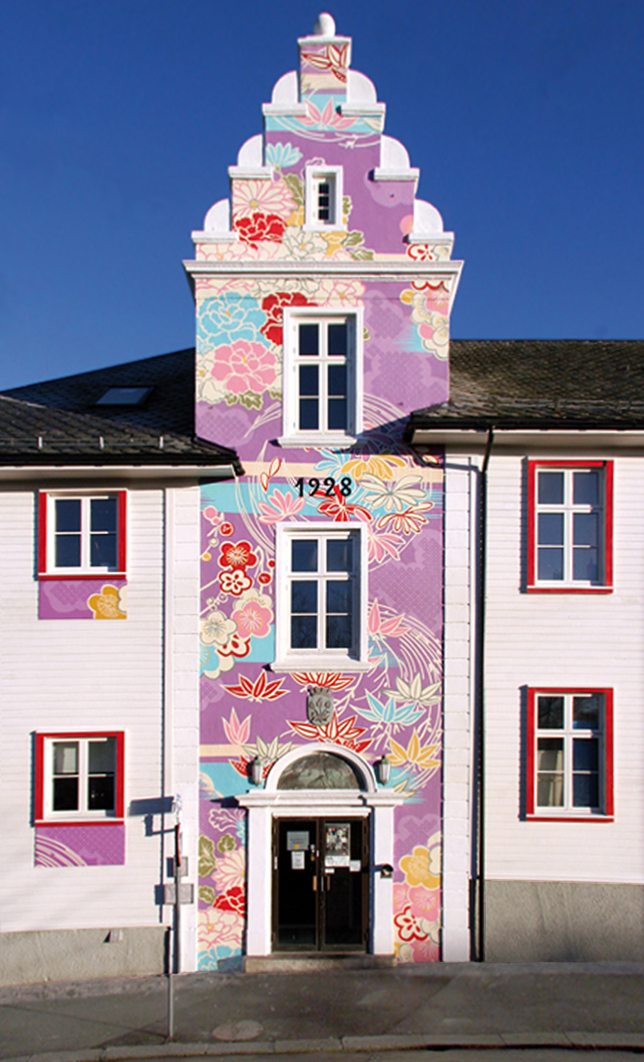
A house during Stavanger's Year as capital of culture, 2008

At the point of bid submission, all cities were under the impression that Brexit negotiations would not have an impact on their applications. However, in November 2017 the European Commission wrote to DCMS stating that due to the UK's withdrawal from the European Union, the country could no longer be involved in the European Capital of Culture programme. This was despite the fact that the cities of Istanbul, Reykjavík and Stavanger, are all in countries outside the EU, that had previously been capitals of culture. In response to the EU's decision, Leeds City Council and its partners decided to build on the existing momentum and to run a year of culture in the city, independent from EU support. This move was described by the Financial Times as: "When its bid to be European Capital of Culture was thwarted by Brexit, the city decided to anoint itself and start partying anyway".

== Organisation ==
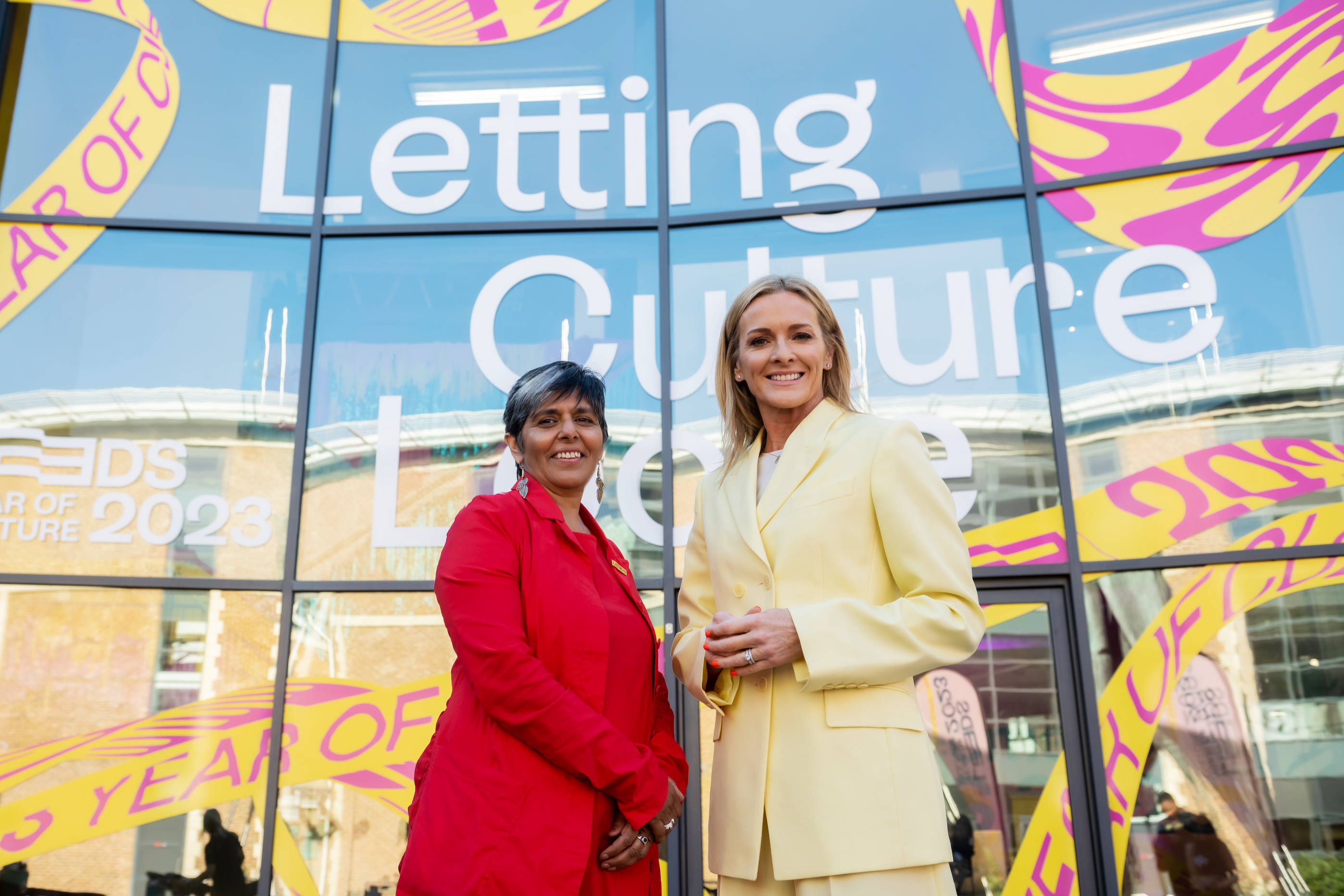
Kully Thiarai and Gabby Logan outside LEEDS 2023 offices at Brewery Place

Leeds Culture Trust, a charity separate to Leeds City Council, was established in 2019 to develop the programme and fund raise for the year of culture. Leeds Culture Trust's first chair was Ruth Pitt, who joined in 2019 but stepped down in June 2021. Frank Findlay became acting chair, prior to the recruitment of Gabby Logan to the role in November 2021; she took up the position in January 2022. Logan stepped down as chair in September 2023, and was replaced by Findlay as acting chair for the remainder of the year of culture.

Kully Thiarai was appointed Creative Director in 2019, leaving her role as Artistic Director of National Theatre Wales. She has previously worked at Cast, Contact Theatre Manchester, the Leicester Haymarket Theatre, Theatre Writing Partnership and Red Ladder Theatre Company. She took up the post in January 2020.

Major investors in LEEDS 2023 include: Leeds City Council, West Yorkshire Combined Authority, Arts Council England, Leeds Community Foundation, the Paul Hamlyn Foundation, Esmée Fairbairn Foundation, British Council, KPMG, HBD, Mott MacDonald, Bruntwood, amongst others. In June 2023, LEEDS 2023 received a £2.1 million grant from the National Lottery Heritage Fund. The British Council was Leeds Culture Trust's core international partner. Leeds Culture Trust agreed to wage and working conditions set by a range of artistic unions, including Equity. Supported by Tracy Brabin, Mayor for West Yorkshire, the year of culture was followed by extensive cultural programming in Kirklees and Calderdale in 2024, and then by Bradford 2025, bringing further regional cultural investment.

== Programme ==
With the strapline 'Letting Culture Loose', LEEDS 2023 announced a community-driven programme in late 2022. The year of culture was also planned to support the city's post COVID-19 pandemic recovery. It described its mission as "an independent, not-for-profit Year of Culture supporting hundreds of creative and cultural events across the city and beyond.".

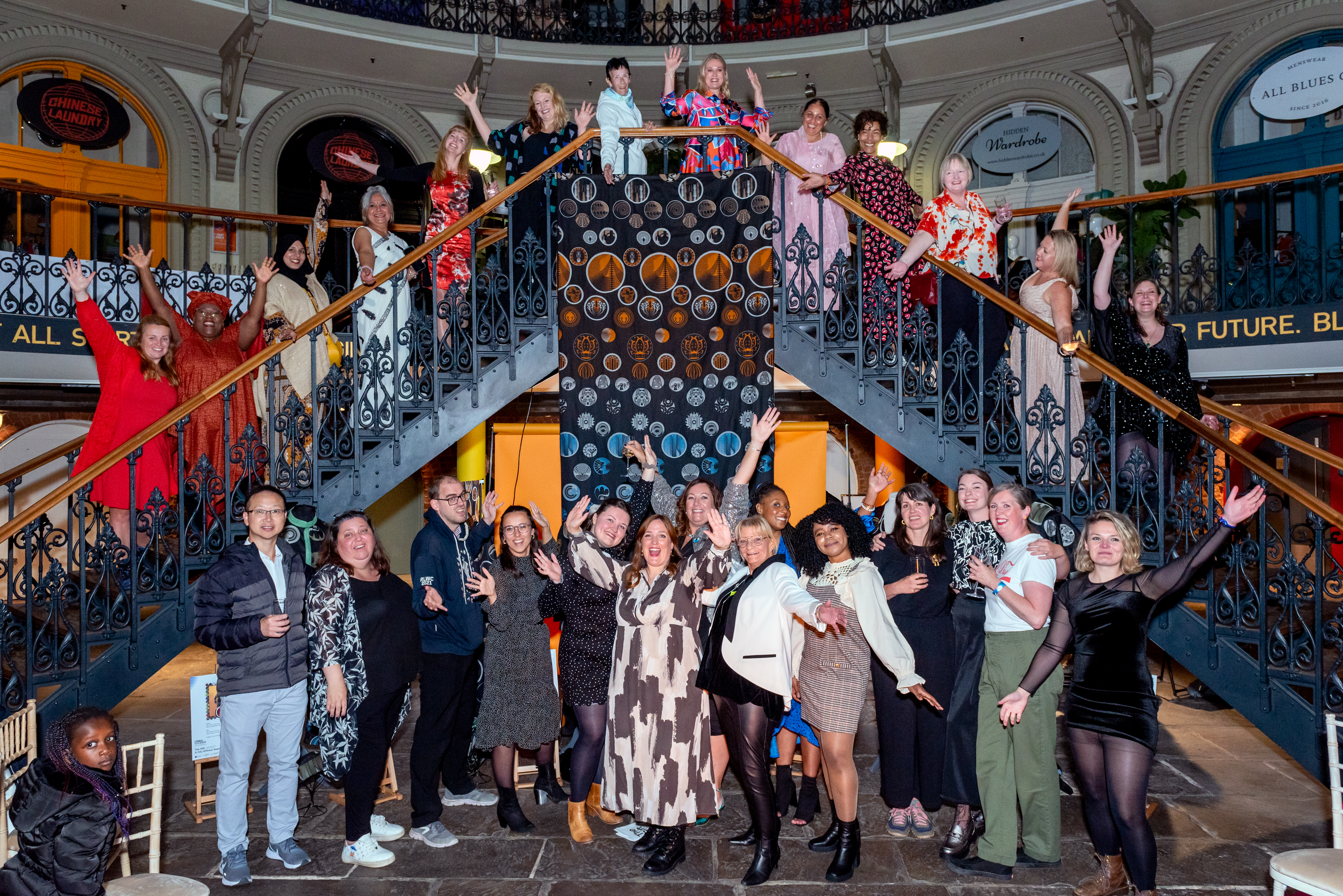
Neighbourhood Hosts posing in the Corn Exchange at the City Without Seams Launch.

The programme worked across every ward in Leeds, recruiting 'Neighbourhood Hosts' to make hyper-local connections and link communities with funding opportunities under the banner of 'My LEEDS 2023'.

Sport was included in the definition of culture, with the year of culture drawing the Junior British Lead Climbing Championships to the city in September, as well as Leeds United wearing themed kits and Elland Road hosting a unique light-show to celebrate the year of culture. Skate boarding featured through partnership to promote skating to women and people of marginalised genders. Unsung Sports focussed on the important roles that gaelic football, table tennis, women's basketball, aikido, roller skating and petanque play in Leeds. By Spring 2023 over 75 artists had been commissioned to produce works, divided into three seasons through the year, entitled Awakening, Playing, and Dreaming.

=== Season 1 - Awakening ===
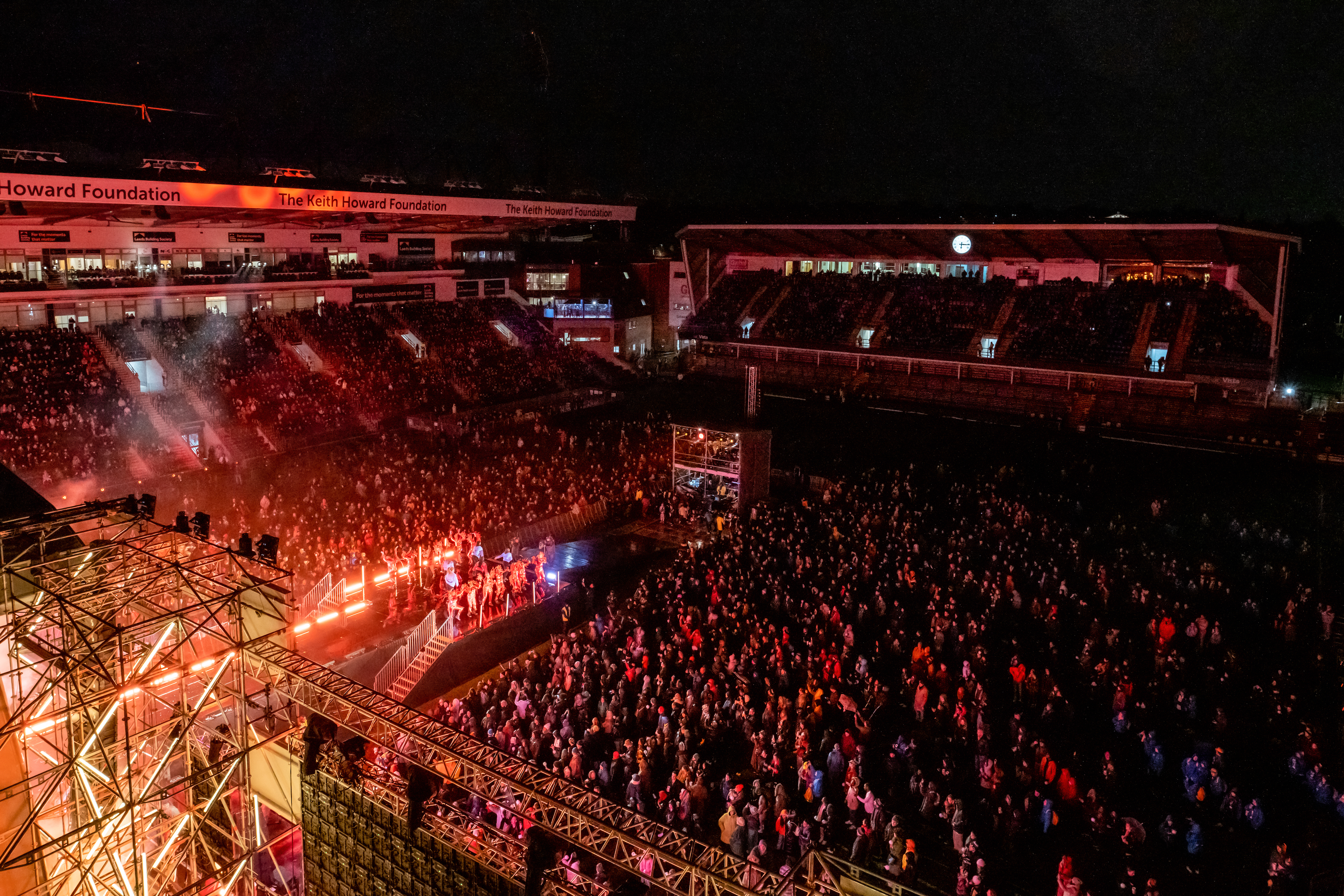
Crowd view from stage featuring carnival dancers on stage. The Awakening.

Held at Headingley Stadium in January, The Awakening was the opening event for LEEDS 2023. Hosted by Gabby Logan and Sanchez Payne, a 10,000 strong crowd was entertained by a range of performers and presenters from Leeds, including: Corinne Bailey Rae, Jamie Jones-Buchanan, Kadeena Cox, George Webster, Simon Armitage and his band, LYR, as well as the chorus of Opera North, Leeds West Indian Carnival, spoken word artists Testament and Danmark Cleary, Ntantu and Graft, as well as tabla expert Inder Goldfinger. Its finale was a drone display featuring a giant, speaking to the people of Leeds.

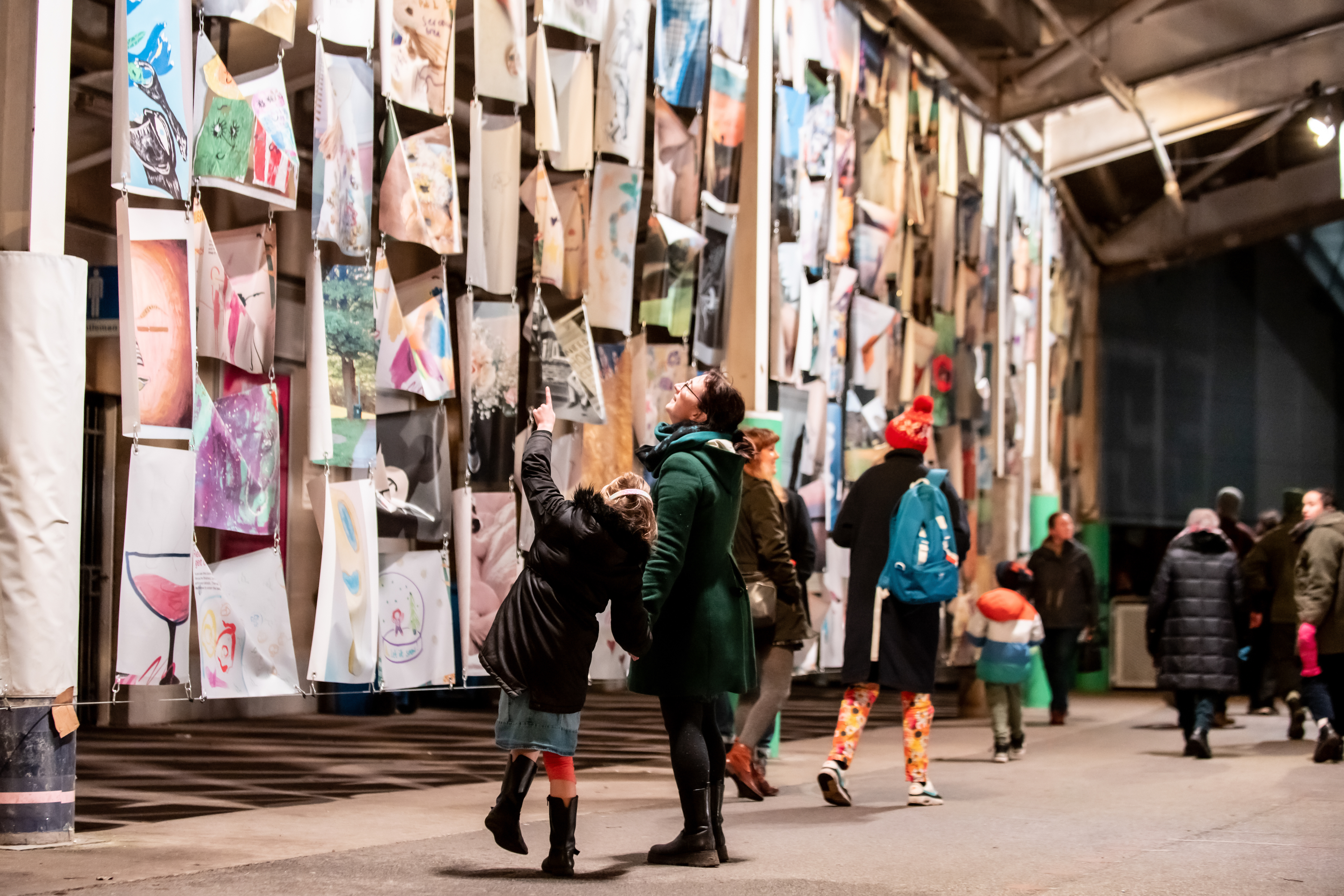
Mother and daughter view hanging artworks. The Awakening.

The audience received their tickets in exchange for sending in original or images of artwork they had made: the programmers took an inclusive view of 'art' citing TikToks as just as valid an artistic expression as painting. These works were exhibited in person at the Merrion Centre under the title Waking the Artist, as well as featuring on billboards and poster drums around the city. It also included a themed beer of the same name, a collaboration with North Brewing Co.

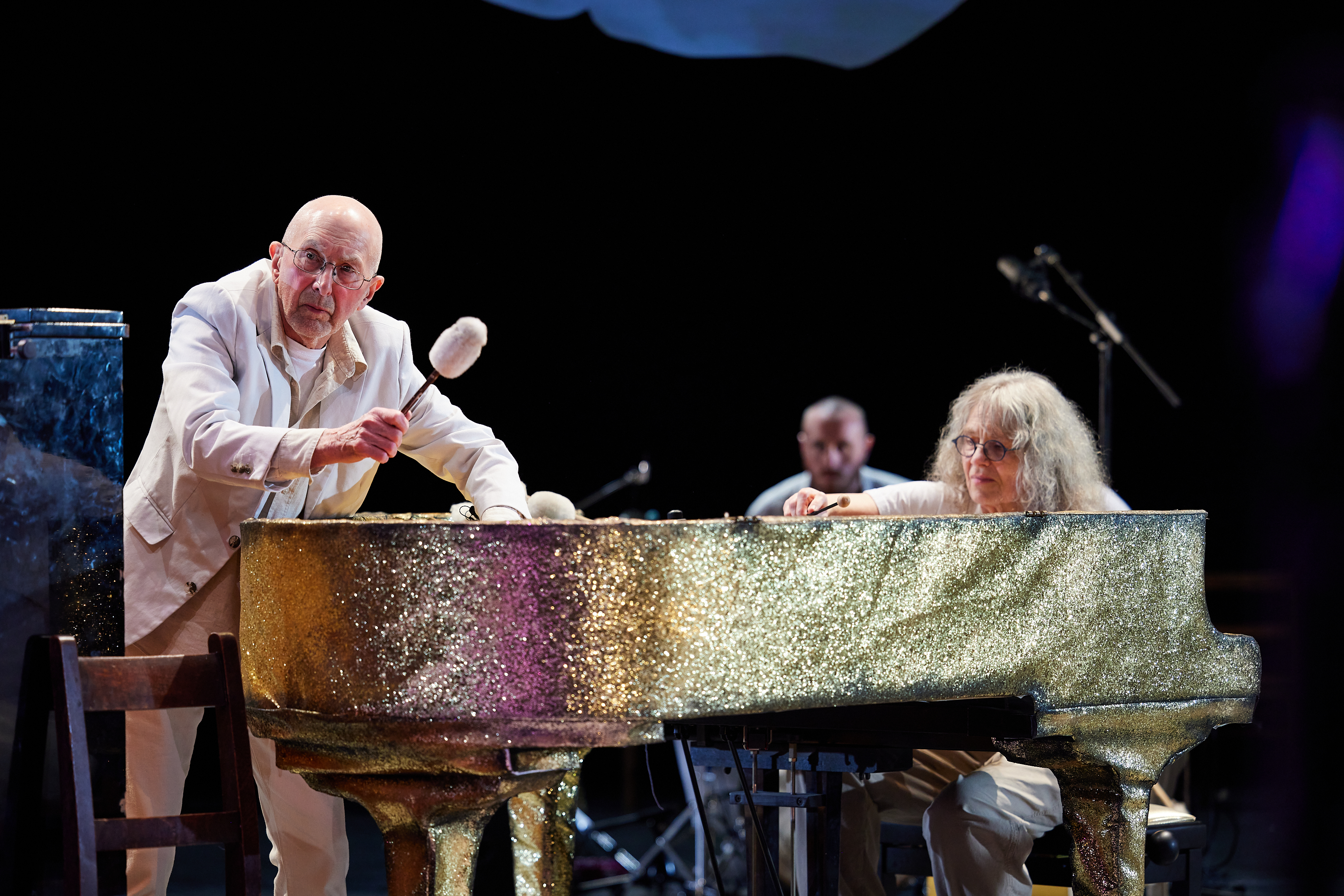
Peter Bartram and Rowena Godfrey in Sinfonia as part of 1001 Stories

Early partnerships included Noah's Flood by Benjamin Britten, performed by children in collaboration with Manchester Collective, and the Leeds Literature Festival, featuring Lemn Sissay. In April, Leeds Playhouse launched 1001 Stories, a series of performances created by The Performance Ensemble, designed to celebrate "older people's vast creativity". As part of the series of performances, Alan Bennett read from his diaries. Sinfonia, one of the pieces developed by The Performance Ensemble was due to go on a national tour after the end of the year of culture.

=== Season 2 - Playing ===
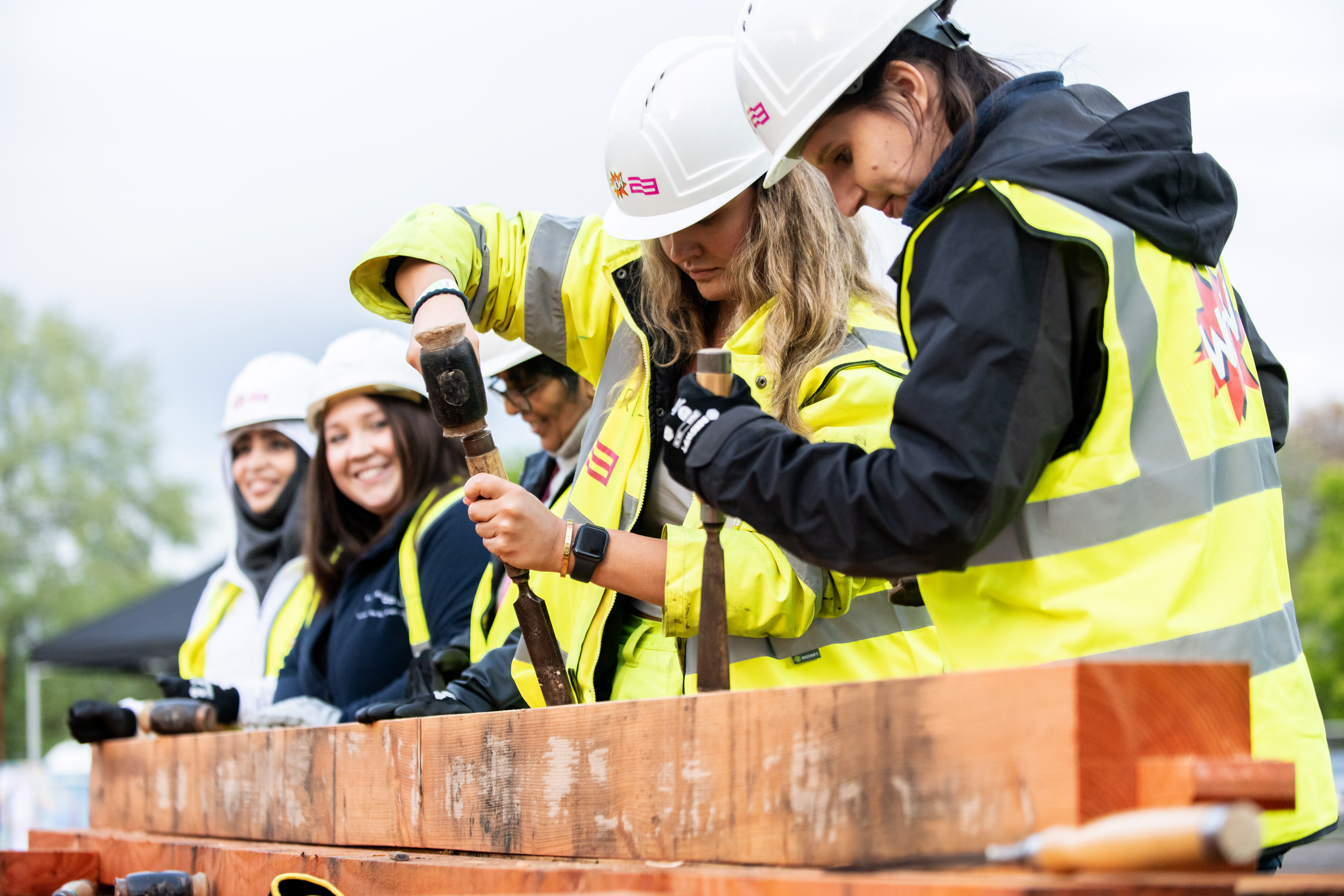
Barnraisers working together to construct WOW Barn.

Unveiled in May 2023, in partnership with Women of the World Festival, the WOW Barn was a new barn built entirely by over 300 women and non-binary people, who undertook training at Leeds College of Building to learn the skills to raise it. The building was used as the venue for Leeds' first iteration of the WOW festival. Initially located on Woodhouse Moor, the barn later moved to Kirkstall Valley Farm. The same month the exhibition Feeling Her Way by Sonia Boyce was shown at Leeds Art Gallery.

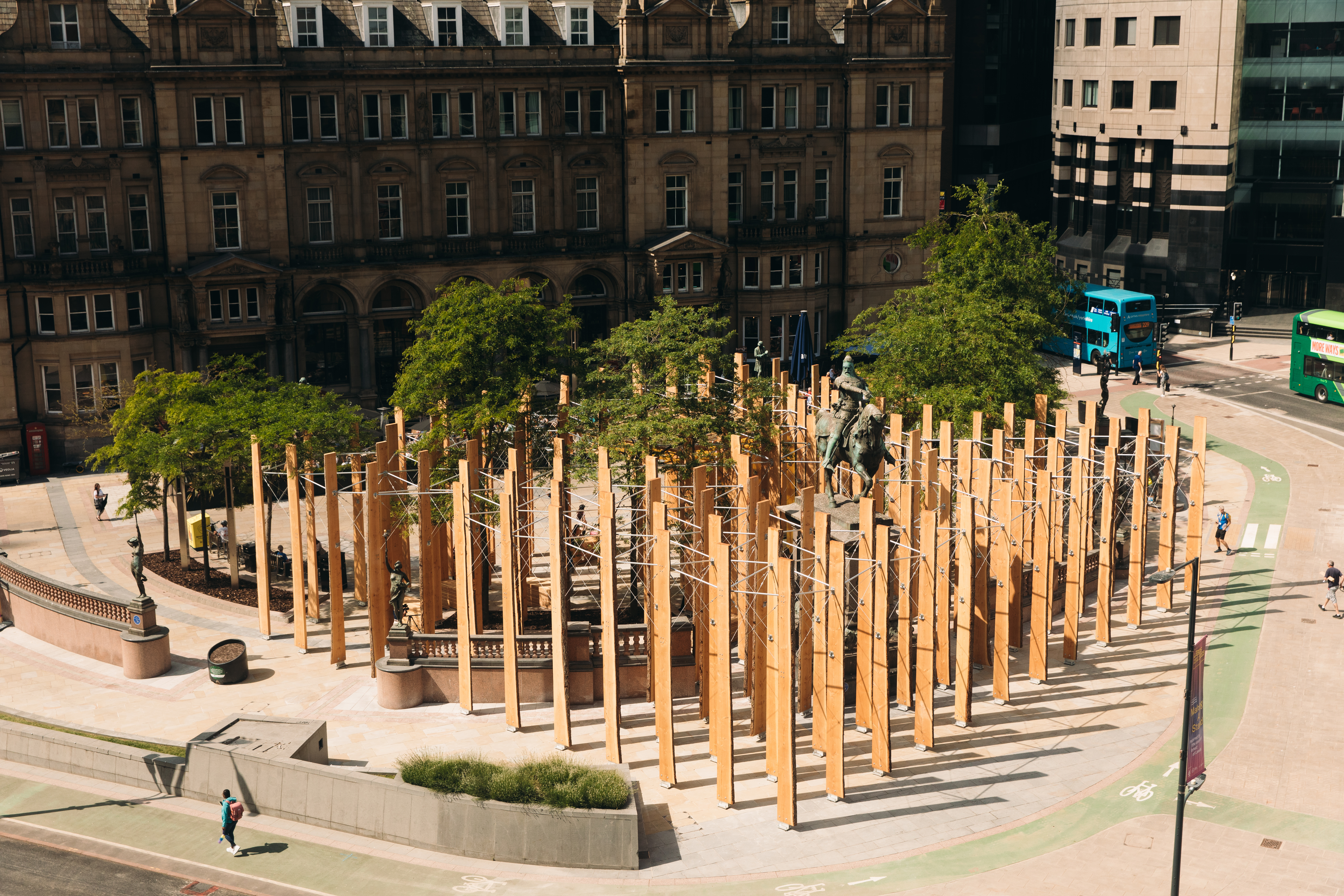
Making A Stand from above, City Square.

In June, Making a Stand, a seven metre tall installation in City Square, inspired by the forests that used to cover Leeds, was revealed to the public. Created by artist Michael Pinsky with Studio Bark, the "sculptural forest" intended to connect the civic realm with themes around sustainability and conservation. The same month, Conservative councillor Alan Lamb stated that the year of culture had the potential to be a "damp squib" and that public imaginations had not yet been captured by the programme. This opinion was rebuffed by Labour councillor Jonathan Pryor, who stated that there had already been an undeniable positive economic impact on the city. This view was reiterated by artistic director, Kully Thiarai, citing that the LEEDS 2023 expected to double the investment made by Leeds City Council.

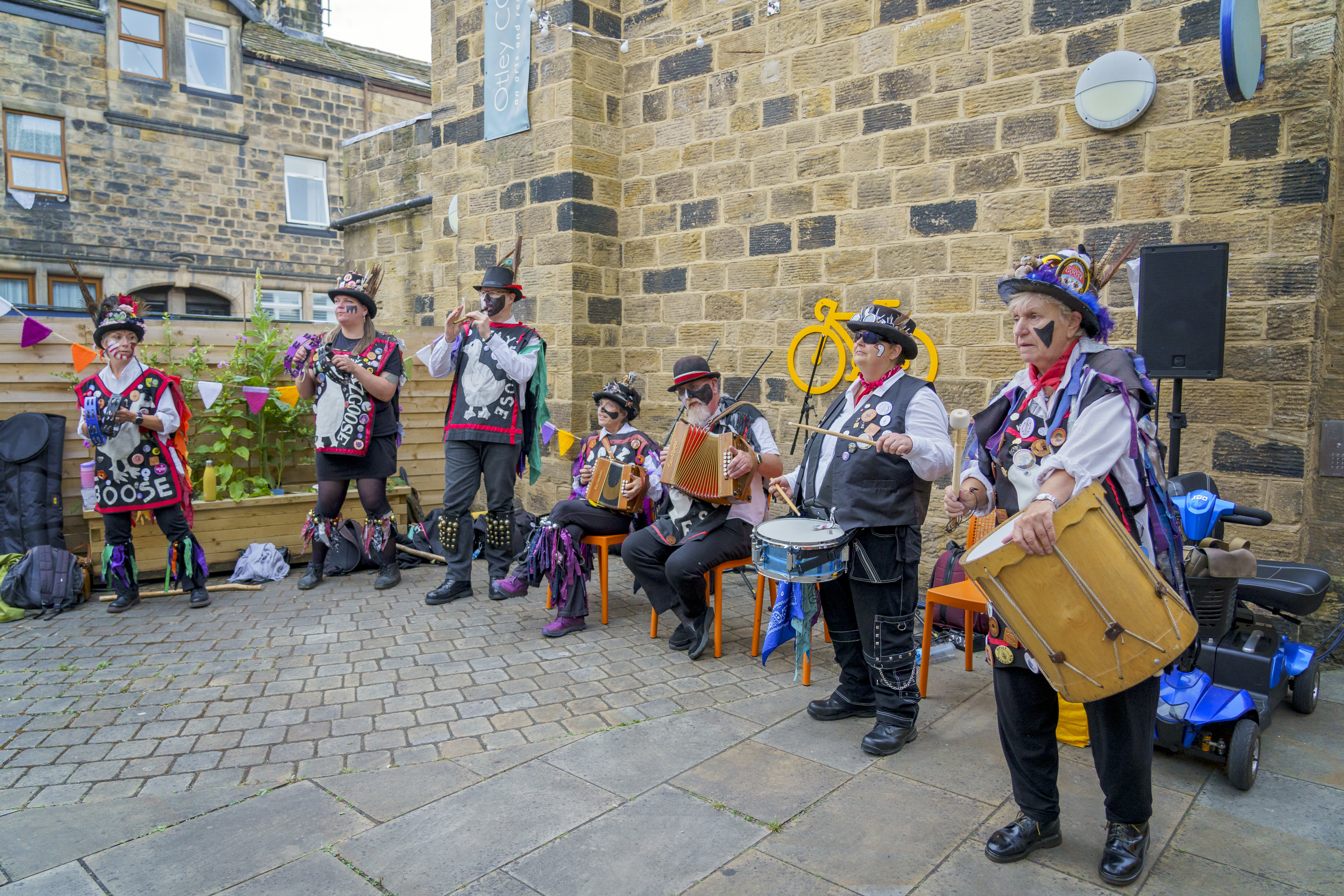
Group of performers playing instruments. Otley.

Children's Day Reimagined was held at Roundhay Park on 14 July. Inspired by the history of Children's Day in Leeds, which ran from 1922 to 1963 and included parades organised by local teachers, the event was designed by children to celebrate their place in Leeds's society today and was produced by Fevered Sleep. The same month, further criticism was voiced by councillors that central city wards benefitted more than outer ones. My LEEDS Summer was a programme of community-led events in all of Leeds' 33 council wards, which included food and music festivals, led by the Neighbourhood Hosts.

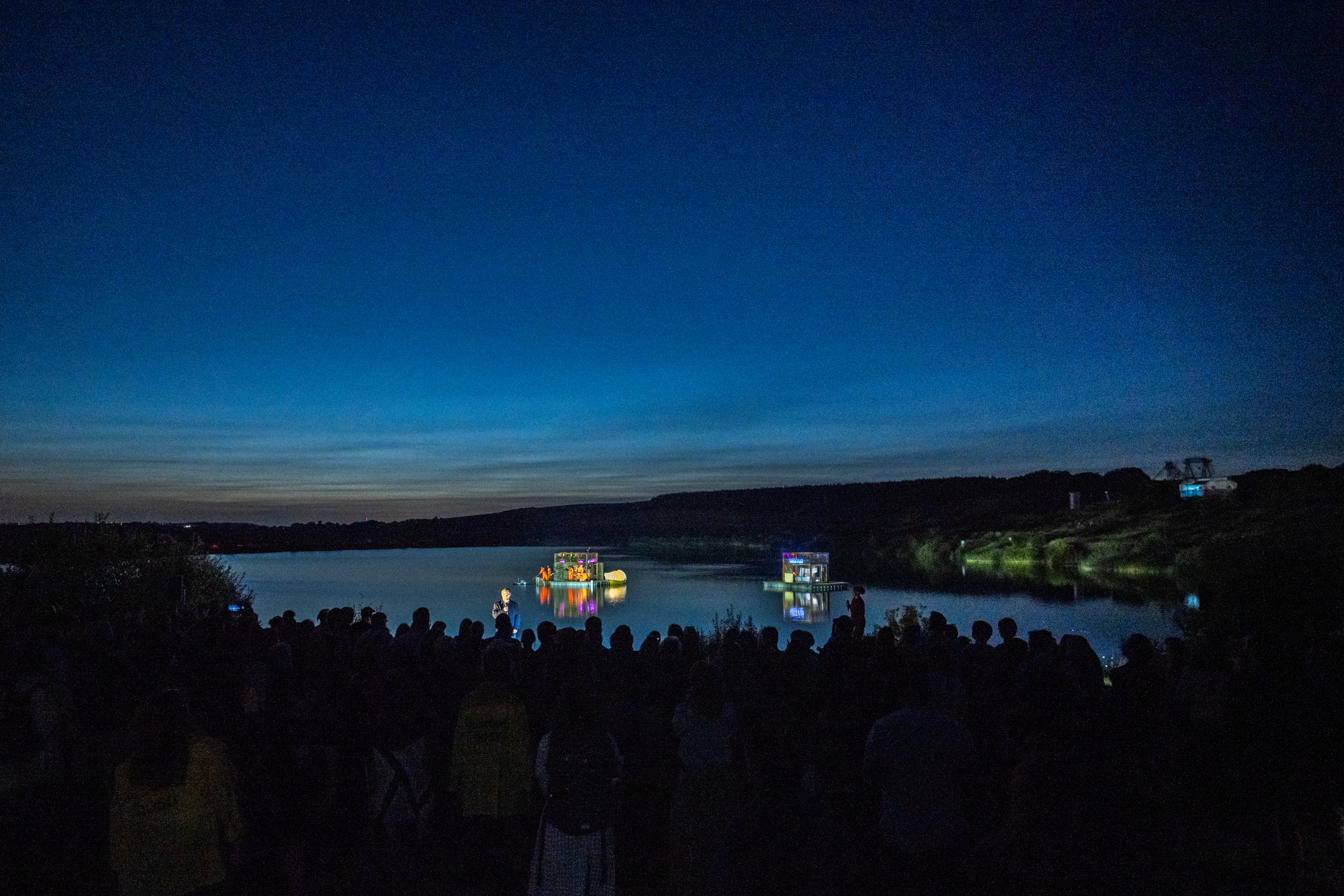
Floating stages lit up on lake at RSPB St Aiden's

In August the programme announced Nest, a site-specific outdoor theatre production by the National Youth Theatre that took place at RSPB St Aiden's in September. The play, set in 2050, the deadline of the Paris Agreement, imagined the future of climate crisis in the region. It was written by Emma Nuttall and directed by Paul Roseby.

=== Season 3 - Dreaming ===
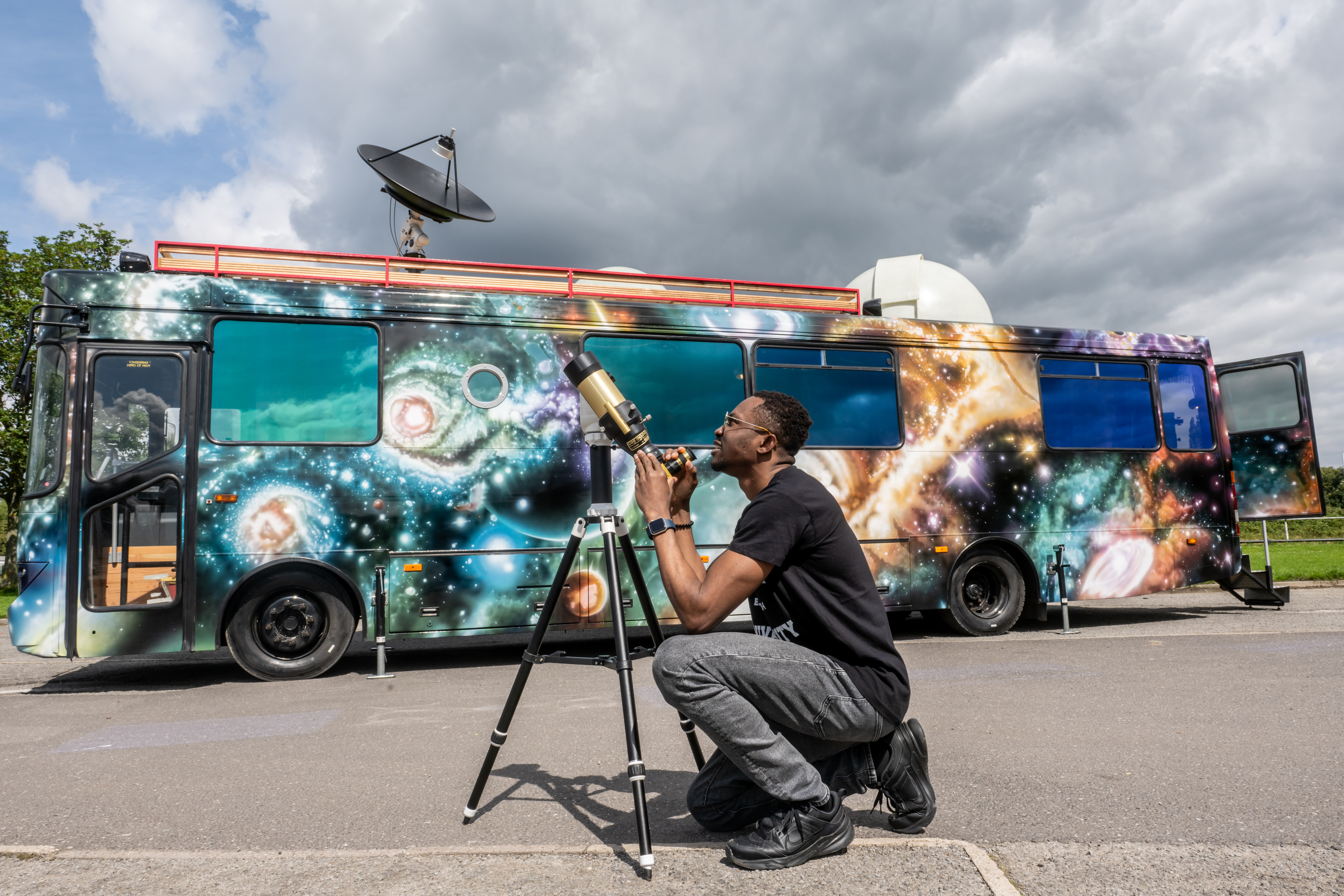
Man looking through telescope outside the Moon Palace mobile observatory.

Inspired by the achievements of civil engineer John Smeaton, Smeaton 300 is a programme celebrating science and creativity. Moon Palace is a mobile astronomical observatory, designed by artists Heather Peak and Ivan Morrison. The bus toured Leeds in the second half of 2023. In partnership with Leeds Industrial Museum, an exhibition entitled Engineery opened in October 2023, which used objects to discuss Smeaton and civil engineering. This included designs for the Eddystone Lighthouse. Another collaboration with the museum was Any Work That Wanted Doing, a series of artists' interventions which explored the lives of disabled mill workers in the nineteenth century.

September saw the launch of A City without Seams, a project between artist Keith Khan and Burberry, celebrating Leeds' textile heritage and the identities of each of its wards. This included designing new logos for the wards, which were exhibited at Leeds Corn Exchange. Criticism of the project, specifically of the logo for the ward Rothwell, was raised by councillor Diane Chapman. Khan and artistic director Kully Thiarai defended the illustration, stating that it depicted rhubarb growing by candlelight, an agricultural practice that the area is famous for.

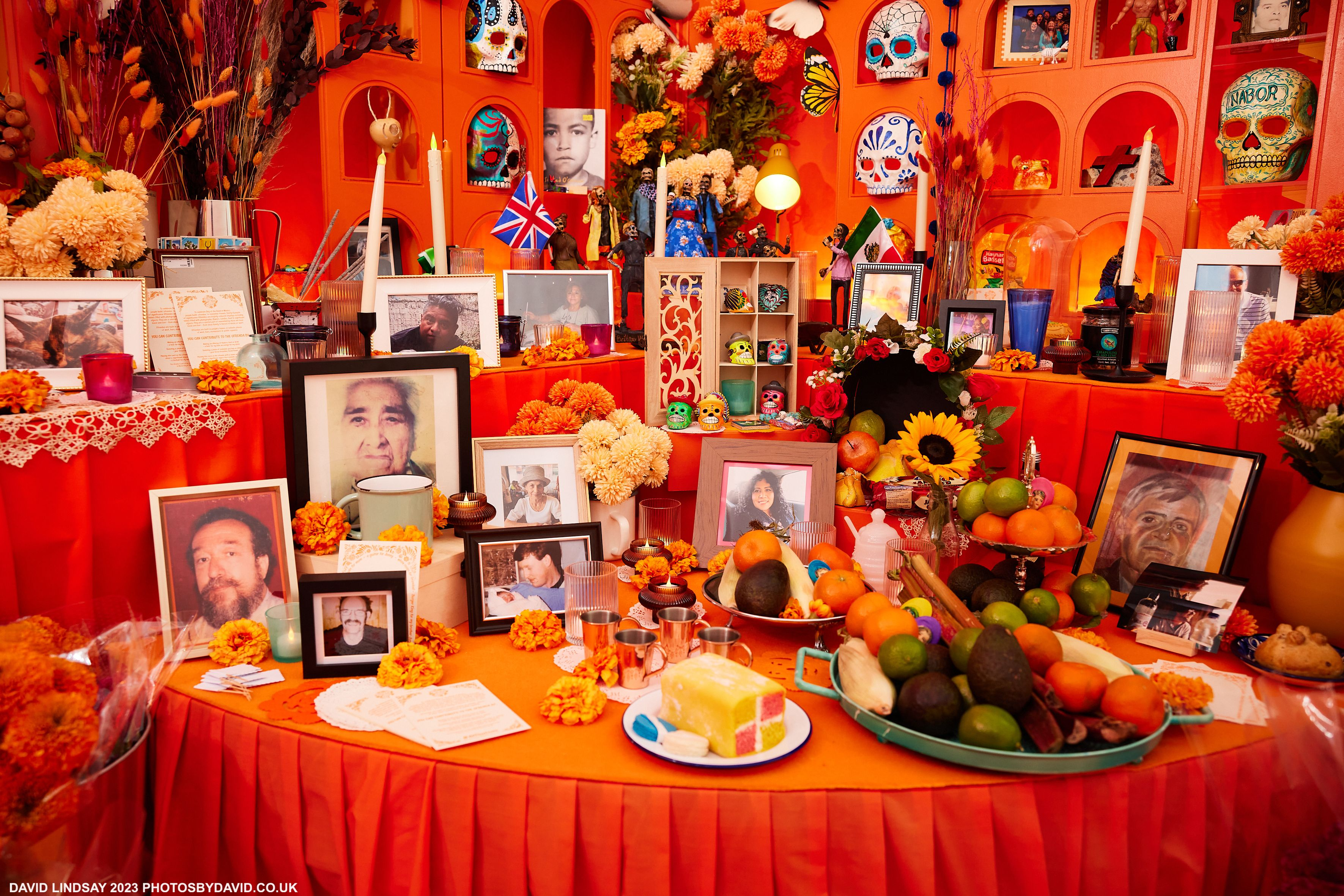
Ofrenda table from All That Lives.

In October the programme included a series of events entitled All That Lives by artists Ellie Harrison and Zion Art Studio from Mexico, who used Mexican Day of the Dead celebrations to explore death and dying in Yorkshire. The multimedia installation This is a Forest also launched, bringing indigenous artists working with Invisible Flock to display newly commissioned work to Leeds. Artists included Jenni Laiti, Anushka Athique, Vandria Borari, Nwando Ebizie and Outi Pieski. And She Built a Crooked House was another commission, in collaboration with Artangel UK, where artist Gemma Anderson-Tempini created installations in an empty Victorian villa, which explored themes of string theory and motherhood.

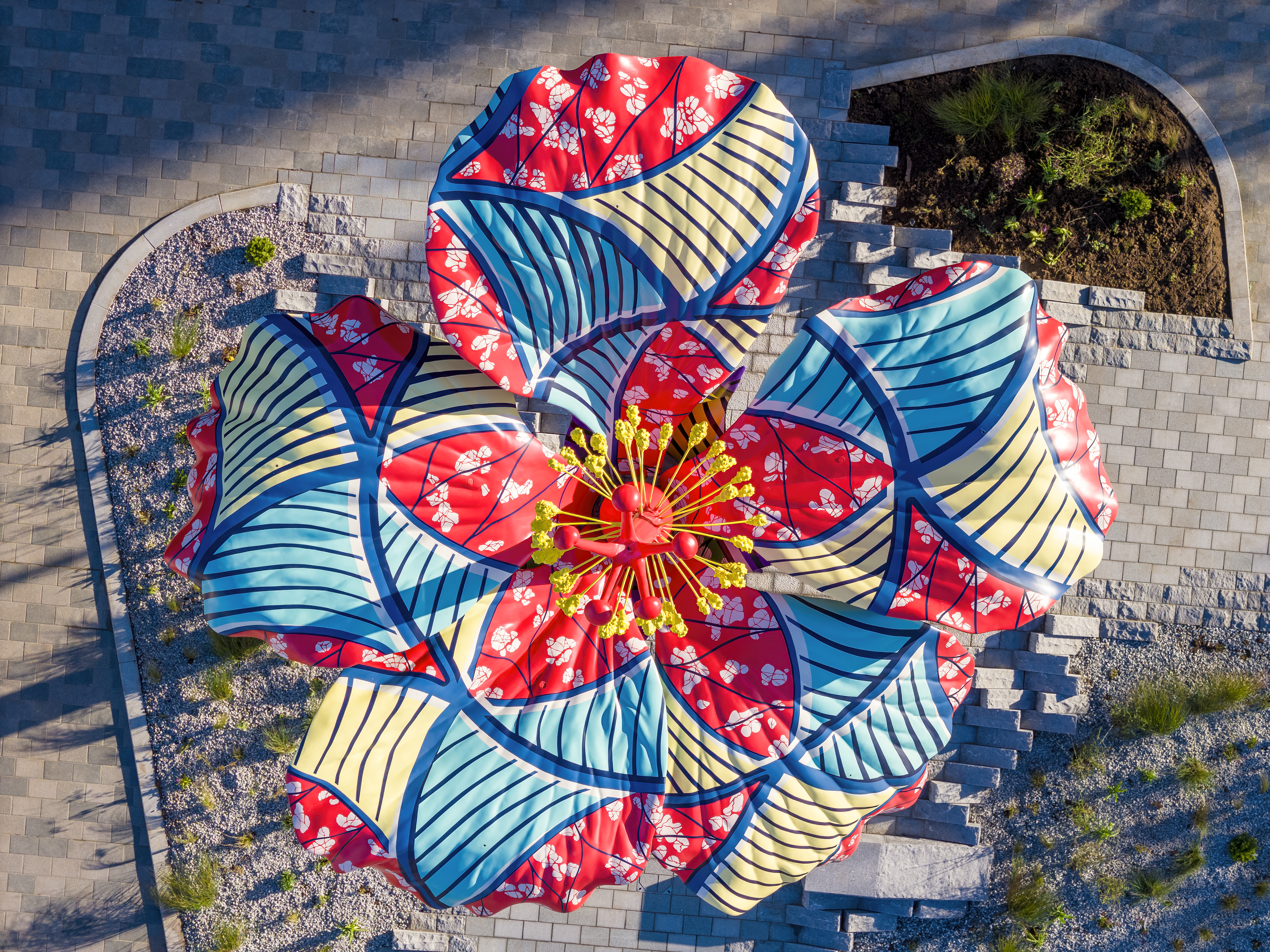
Hibiscus Rising sculpture from above.

The first permanent outdoor sculpture by Yinka Shonibare was unveiled in November 2023. Entitled Hibiscus Rising it commemorates David Oluwale, a Nigerian homeless man who was persecuted by officers from Leeds City Police, leading to his death in 1969. New installation of artworks under Leeds Train Station on Neville Street were also unveiled as part of the year of culture.

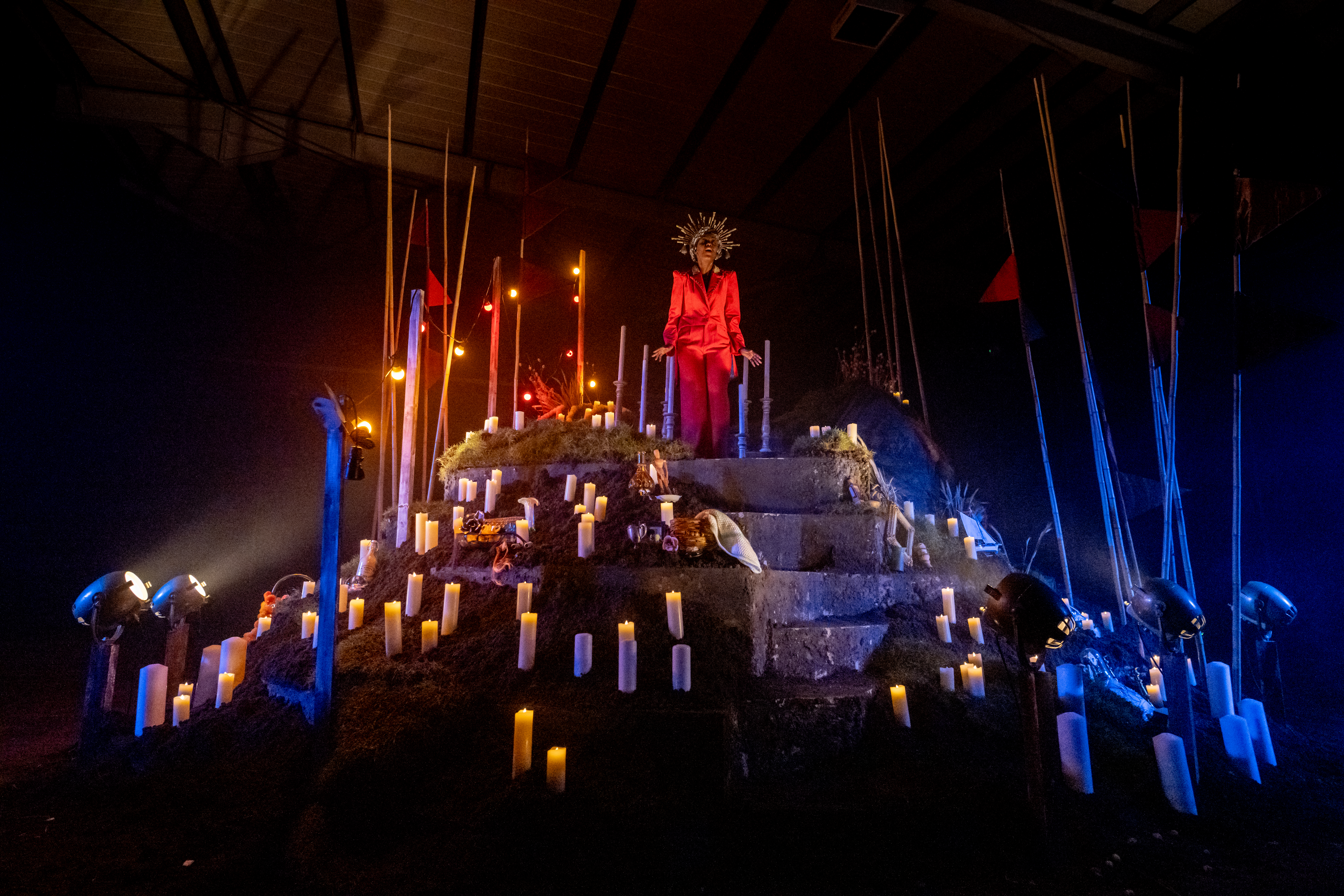
Performer David Anthony Bevan Lane on the ceremonial mound during The Gifting.

Included as finale projects were Northern Dreaming and The Gifting, linked together as creative storytelling. The Gifting, which took place in December, directed by Kully Thiarai and Alan Lane of Slung Low, was co-produced with the British Library. The show was a piece of immersive theatre, where audience members wore headphones. Northern Dreaming distributed copies of a new book to every child born in Leeds in 2023 as part of a partnership with the British Library.

== Legacy ==
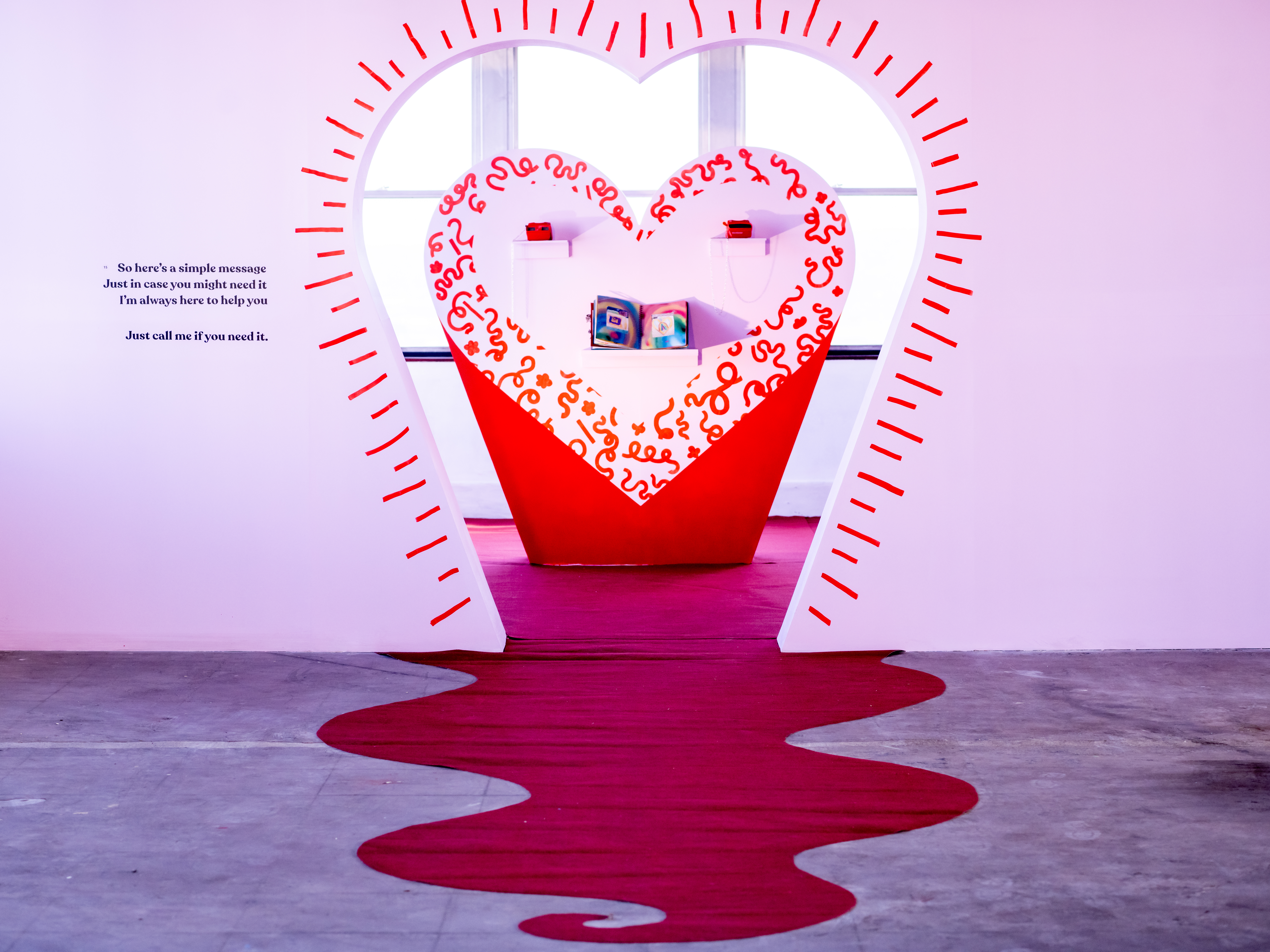
Pink heart art installation as part of Waking the Artist Exhibition.

In January 2021, it was predicted that LEEDS 2023 would create 10% growth in the Leeds visitor economy, bring in £114 million of additional direct and indirect revenue, bring 1310 new jobs, create 1000 freelance roles and train 2000 volunteers. Final evaluation of the year of culture was undertaken by The Audience Agency and the Centre for Cultural Value at the University of Leeds.

Reception to the unofficial year of culture was mixed: Liberal Democrat councillor Stewart Golton stated that "The majority of people where I live don't even know it's happened," and that "It hasn't been worth the money spent and it could have been really fantastic if we'd taken it seriously and planned it properly." In the same article former deputy council leader and executive member for culture, Jonathan Pryor, claimed "We’ve really managed to put Leeds on the map, nationally and internationally."

An initial review by the BBC suggested that although the year had suffered bad luck related to the COVID-19 pandemic and poor weather, it "may help change perceptions of the city" but "Its true impact may take years to measure.". Those challenges were reiterated by Kully Thiarai, speaking to the Yorkshire Evening Post in December 2023, however she went on to state that the year "put Leeds on the cultural map, nationally and internationally – and I think we can certainly say that that's happened in the way people talk about the city".
