= Ekkehard von Braunmühl =

German opinion journalist (1940–2020)

Ekkehard von Braunmühl born Wilhelm Ekkehard Hans Joachim Mariano von Braunmühl (29 December 1940, Gleiwitz - 24 June 2020, Wiesbaden) was a German freelance journalist and child rights activist. He is best known as the founder of Antipedagogy, a concept that challenges traditional approaches to education and child-rearing. Braunmühl's lifelong commitment to advocating for children's rights and challenging conventional educational norms left a lasting impact on the discourse around child-rearing and education. His work encourages us to rethink our approach to nurturing the next generation.

== Antipedagogy ==
Braunmühl advocated for the abolition of traditional education. He rejected the idea of “training” children through strict discipline to conform to adult expectations. Instead, he emphasized respecting the developing personality of the child and treating them as equals. According to Braunmühl, child-friendly behavior cannot be taught directly; it must be learned through experience. His book, Zeit für Kinder (Time for Children), served as a guidebook for those who wanted to embrace child-friendliness. He considered it a tool in the “antipädagogic struggle for freedom” and encouraged people everywhere to advocate for children's well-being and freedom.

Braunmühl believed that children should have space for exploration and independent learning rather than being “trained” or “conditioned” through traditional education methods. In 1970, Braunmühl co-founded the parents’ association 1. APC Kinderhaus e. V. (1st Antipädagogical Club) in Wiesbaden. This association continued the antipedagogic tradition by operating as a child day care center.

Braunmühl's ideas were later adopted by Hubertus von Schoenebeck, albeit with some misunderstandings and distortions. This led to a heated discussion, culminating in the publication of the book, Was ist antipädagogische Aufklärung? Mißverständnisse, Mißbräuche, Mißerfolge der radikalen Erziehungskritik (What Is Antipädagogische Aufklärung? Misunderstandings, Abuses, and Failures of Radical Educational Critique) in 1997. His work aimed to shed light on the misconceptions surrounding antipedagogic ideas and their practical implications.

== Publications ==
- Antipädagogik. (1975), Neuauflage: tologo, Leipzig 2006, ISBN 978-3-9810444-3-0.
- Zeit für Kinder. (1978), Neuauflage: tologo, Leipzig 2006, ISBN 978-3-9810444-2-3
- Musterkind. Tagebuch eines minderjährigen Menschen, Rowohlt Taschenbuch Verlag, Reinbek 1984, Neuauflage: tologo, Leipzig 2007, ISBN 978-3-9810444-6-1
- Der heimliche Generationenvertrag. Jenseits von Pädagogik und Antipädagogik., Rowohlt Taschenbuch Verlag, Reinbek 1986, ISBN 3499179997.
- Zur Vernunft kommen. Eine 'Anti-Psychopädagogik. Beltz, Weinheim 1990, ISBN 3407340362
- with Annette Böhm, Liebe ohne Hiebe Patmos Verlag, Leipzig 1993, ISBN 3491500079
- with Annette Böhm: Gleichberechtigung im Kinderzimmer. Der vergessene Schritt zum Frieden. Patmos Verlag, Leipzig 1994, ISBN 3-491-50012-5
- Was ist antipädagogische Aufklärung? Mißverständnisse, Mißbräuche, Mißerfolge der radikalen Erziehungskritik. Kid Verlag, 1997, ISBN 3929386151

== See also ==
- Pedagogy
- Children's rights
