= Kully Thiarai =

British theatre maker

Kully Thiarai FRSA
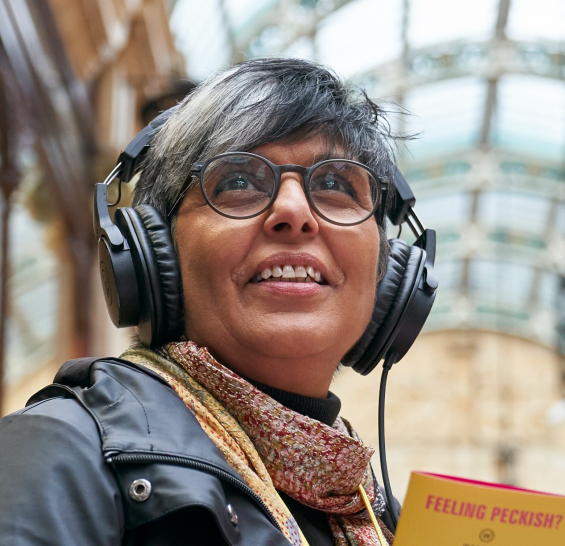
- Citizenship: British
- Education: Bradford University
- Occupation: Theatre director
- Known for: Creative Director of LEEDS 2023

Kully Thiarai is a British artistic and creative director whose career began in theatre. With her appointment at National Theatre Wales in 2016, she became the first Asian person, and only second woman, to lead a national theatre company in Britain. She has held multiple artistic directorships, including, from 2020 to 2024, the role of creative director for LEEDS 2023 – the city's independent year of culture.

== Early life ==
Thiarai grew up in Smethwick in the West Midlands, where her father was employed as a labourer in the steelworks. She initially studied social work at Bradford University. At Theatre in the Mill, then run by Ruth Mackenzie, Thiarai was introduced to performances by companies such as Gay Sweatshop and Phoenix Dance which influenced a future career in theatre. She is of Indian descent.

== Career ==
Thiarai's first job in theatre was with Red Ladder Theatre Company. A subsequent role there enabled Thiarai to support the development of new South Asian work like Bhangra Girls. In 1994 she was appointed artistic director of Red Ladder Theatre Company, a role she held until 1998. During this time she commissioned a variety of new shows, including: Kaahini by Maya Chowdhry, End of Season by Noel Greig, Sleeping Dogs by Philip Osment, and Crush by Rosy Fordham. She also founded the Asian Theatre School; this ultimately became Freedom Studios, led by Madani Younis.

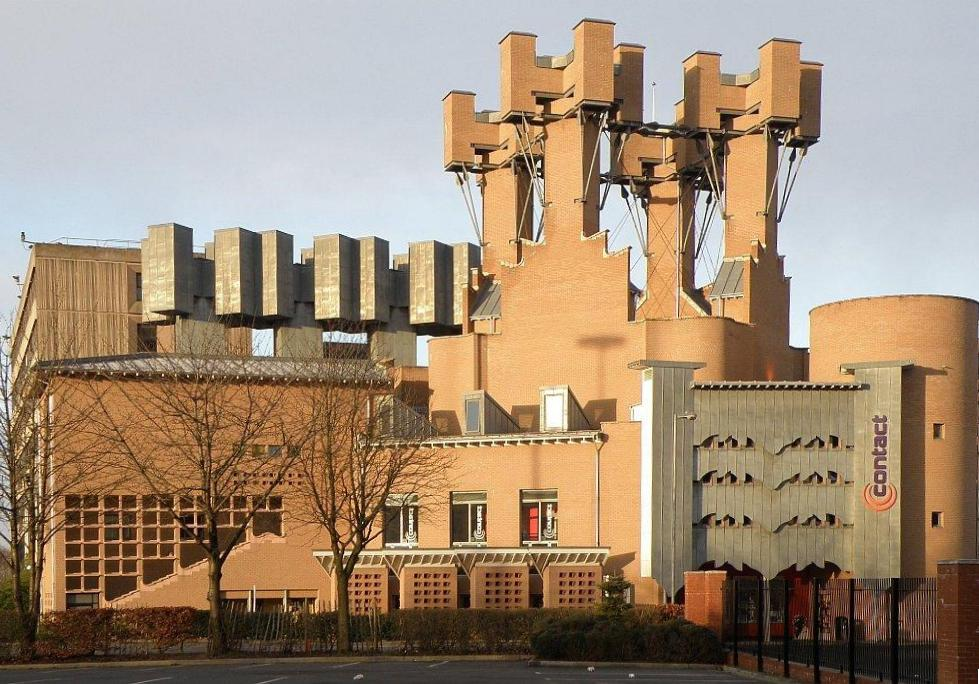
Contact Theatre, 2009

In 1998 she began a new role at Contact Theatre in Manchester, re-imagining the theatre as a centre for young people with a renewed "artistic vision and operational model" for the organisation. Whilst there she also worked with Noel Greig to create Contacting the World, which was part of the Commonwealth Games' cultural programme. She was left Contact Theatre holding the role of artistic director.

At Leicester Haymarket Theatre Thiarai was co-artistic director with Paul Kerryson. Productions during her tenure included: Death of a Salesman with Joseph Marcell playing Willie Loman, Master Harold and the Boys by Athol Fugard, Bollywood Jane by Amanda Whittington, Fortune Club by Dolly Dhingra, and Bones by Kay Adshead.

In 2010 Thiarai worked for National Theatre Wales on The Soul Exchange, a play about Teddy Boys in Butetown, where audiences travelled in taxis as part of the performance. In 2012 she directed Mandala, an outdoor dance work in Birmingham and Nottingham with Sampad arts organisation, as part of the 2012 Cultural Olympiad. She also worked as artistic director of the Theatre Writing Partnership, based in Nottingham.

In 2013 she became the founding director of CAST in Doncaster, a new £22 million venue, where she worked to make CAST a "living room" for the town and its people. She has used the term 'porous' to describe how to integrate communities practices with more traditional forms of theatre. One noted production was an adaptation of Kes by Philip Osment, another was the opening show The Glee Club by Richard Cameron, a playwright from Doncaster. Thiarai left Cast in May 2016 to join National Theatre Wales (NTW) as artistic director and CEO.

At National Theatre Wales (NTW) she was the first Asian person, and only second woman, to lead one of the national theatre companies in the United Kingdom. Notable productions during her time there included We're Still Here, about the Tata Steelworks. During her tenure, NTW was criticised for not doing enough to support Welsh artists, claims Thiarai rebuffed stating during the "history of the company is that almost 80% of all of its work has been led by Welsh artists". Thiarai moved in 2019 to work as creative cirector of LEEDS 2023, beginning her role in 2020. On her departure, critic Gary Raymond wrote:

For every criticism aimed at Thiarai from a white middle class theatre practitioner in Wales, she was adored by those she worked with from minority backgrounds, and inspired countless people to work in theatre in Wales who otherwise would never have considered a UK national theatre a space in which to express themselves.

— Gary Raymond, Kully Thiarai departure from NTW | Failure of Wales?, Wales Arts Review

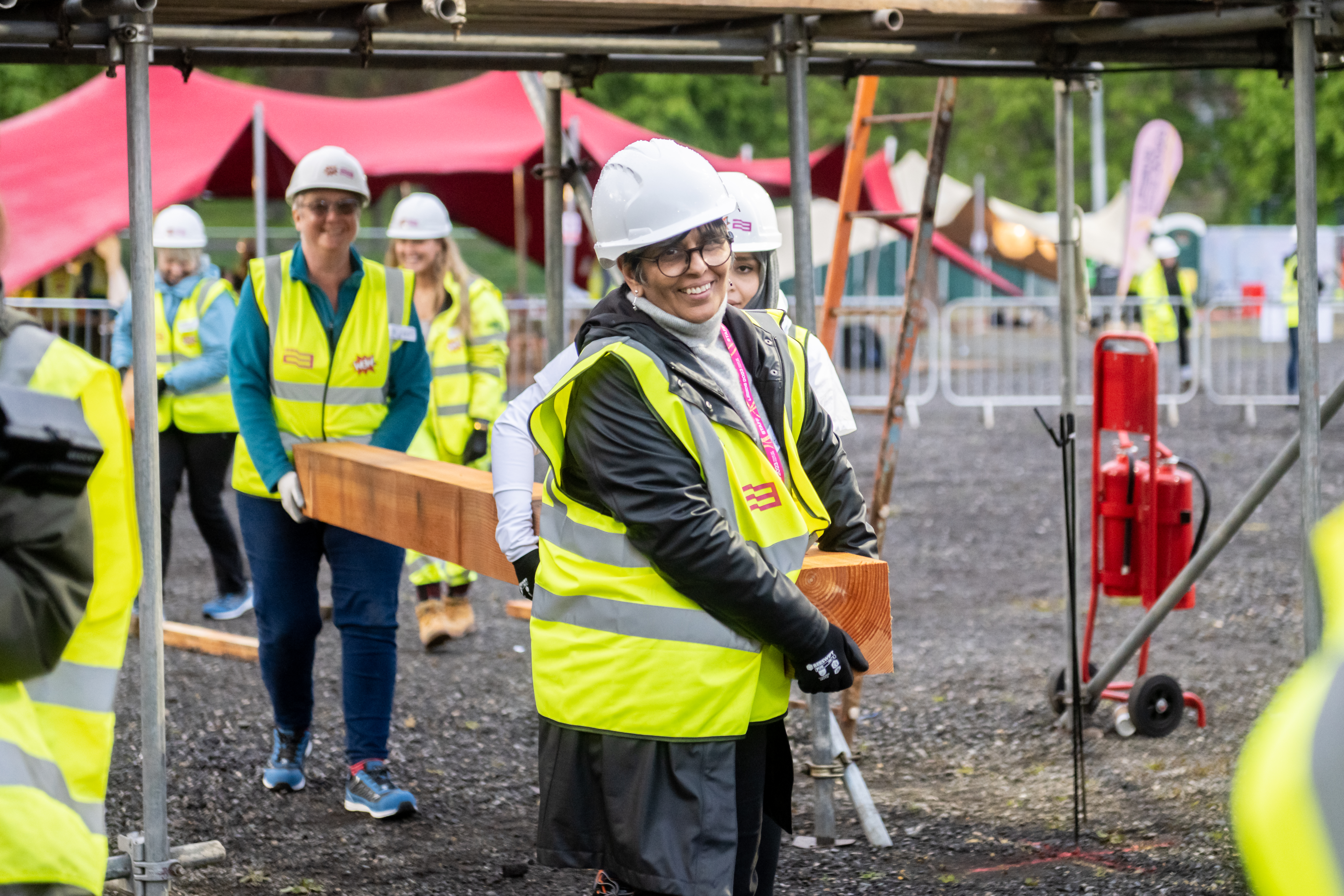
Barnraisers including Kully Thiarai during The WOW Barn build, Cinder Moor. LEEDS 2023

From January 2020 Thiarai was the Creative Director and CEO of LEEDS 2023. Initially proposed as a bid to the host city for European Capital of Culture, post-Brexit exclusion from European Union initiatives meant that Leeds could no longer complete. This resulted in Leeds City Council and partners deciding to run an independent year of culture in 2023. Thiarai stated in December 2023 that through complex programming and community-engaged practice, the year had "put Leeds on the cultural map, nationally and internationally – and I think we can certainly say that that's happened in the way people talk about the city".

In March 2023 she was appointed as the next chair of Paines Plough. In November 2023 she joined the Board of National Theatre of Scotland.

== Awards and recognition ==
- Fellow of the Royal Society of Arts
- Honorary Fellow of the Royal Central School of Speech and Drama
- Judge for the BBC World Service's International Radio Play Writing Competition
- Tonic Award (2018)
- Cultural Icon – Northern Asian Power List (2020)
- The Stage 100 List (2024)

Her name is one of those featured on the sculpture Ribbons, unveiled in 2024.
