= Everett Reimer =

Education theorist and author

- Born: 1910
- Died: 1998 (aged 87–88)
- Occupation: Education theorist

Everett W. Reimer (1910–1998) was an education theorist who authored several books on educational policy and was a proponent of deschooling. He was a notable friend of Ivan Illich, whom he met at the Catholic University of Puerto Rico.

Everett did a variety of things as a young man, including selling maps, playing professional football, printing greeting cards, and working at a tire factory. During the Second World War he was a civil servant. After the war Reimer worked for the Atomic Energy Commission, for the Survey Research Center at the University of Michigan, and for the Washington Research Center of the Maxwell School, University of Syracuse.

After these jobs Reimer came to Puerto Rico as Secretary of Committee of Human Resources, and worked for the Alliance for Progress. Reimer met Ivan Illich in 1958 in Puerto Rico, where they jointly developed their philosophy of deschooling. Reimer then joined the Center for Intercultural Documentation (CIDOC), as the Director of the CIDOC seminar on Alternatives in Education.

== Books published ==
- Power for All or for None by Katherine and Everett Reimer (1998)

Paperback: 348 pages
Publisher: Inkworks Press Oakland, CA (1998)
Language: English
ASIN B0006R0WC8

- School is Dead: Alternatives in Education

176 pages
Publisher: Penguin (1971)
Language: English
ISBN 0-14-080169-3

- Unusual ideas in education (Series B: Opinions / International Commission on the Development of Education) (Series B: Opinions / International Commission on the Development of Education)

11 pages
Publisher: Unesco (January 1, 1971)
Language: English
ASIN B0007C5FTW

- Social problems associated with the development of Puerto Rico during the last two decades (January 1, 1960)

Publisher: s.n. (January 1, 1960)
Language: English
ASIN B0007JY33E

- Venezuela's human resources (January 1, 1964)
- Problems of methodology in the investigation and planning of education [and] training in Venezuela (January 1, 1964)
- Three weeks in the life of a utopia (1976)
- Futuros alternativos (Serie de planificación)

110 pages
Publisher: Editorial Universitaria, Universidad de Puerto Rico; 1. ed edition (1976)
Language: Spanish
ISBN 0-8477-2434-4

- Social planning: Collected papers, 1957-68 (CIDOC cuaderno) (1968)
- Comprehensive educational planning in Puerto Rico (Comprehensive planning in state education agencies) (January 1, 1968)

103 pages
Publisher: Office of Planning and Educational Development, Dept. of Education (January 1, 1968)
Language: English
ASIN B0007K2TJ8
