= Antipedagogy =

Critical theory of education

Antipedagogy (German: Antipädagogik; Ancient Greek: anti-against + pais-child, boy + agein- lead; UK: /æntjipɛdʔɡɒdʒi/), sometimes spelled anti-pedagogy with the hyphen, is a critical theory that examines traditional pedagogical dynamics, particularly scrutinizing the exercise of parental or educational authority as a violation of human rights. The anti-pedagogical enlightenment brings attention to the detrimental effects of conventional pedagogy and advocates for intergenerational equality. In 1975, Ekkehard von Braunmühl laid the foundation for this theory with his publication, "Antipedagogy – Studies on the Abolition of Education".

== Overview ==
The term "antipedagogy" denotes an approach or opposition to specific principles and methods of traditional education and pedagogy. This perspective scrutinizes the structure of the educational system, teaching and learning methods, and the role of authority in education. Generally, antipedagogy includes elements like challenging hierarchical authority, emphasizing individualized learning, subverting traditional structures, employing alternative teaching methods, and resisting the standardization of education.

It is essential to recognize that this is a broad definition, and the antipedagogical approach exhibits variations among practitioners and theorists within the movement. For some scholars, antipedagogy may manifest as a common-sense departure from traditional education, while for others, it could entail a more radical opposition to the established structures and principles.

Different views on traditional pedagogy and education, including objective criticism and nihilistic attitudes, reject the necessity of human education and pedagogy as a unique theoretical science. Traditional education is perceived as a repressive endeavor that neglects the child's freedom, dignity, and rights, hindering the expression of their true self. Advocates of antipedagogism are dedicated to fostering children's freedom, promoting harmony between their activities and emotions, encouraging externalization and internalization, and advocating for the deschooling of society.

The roots of antipedagogism can be traced back to the early 17th century when the related word 'pedagogue' began to carry a negative connotation of pedantry, dating back to at least the 1650s. During that period, it became associated with the English parliamentarian Samuel Pepys, who expressed a negative attitude towards and evaluated the terms 'pedagogy' and 'pedagogue' unfavorably. The development of antipedagogical perspectives has also been influenced and contributed to by representatives of the theory of school abolition, such as Ivan Illich, John Holt, Everett Reimer, Neil Postman, Viktor N. Shulgin, etc. Genuine antipedagogism emerged in the late 1960s and 70s, linked to the American psychologist Carl Rogers and the American Children's Rights Movement, led by George A. Miller, R. Farson, and J. Holt. The term "antipedagogy" was coined by H. Kupffer in 1974, with theoretical foundations established by Ekkehard von Braunmühl in his book "Antipädagogik" (1975). Precursors include Maria Montessori, A. S. Neill, Th. Gordon, Célestin Freinet, Ovide Decroly, and Janusz Korczak. It gained prominence in Germany with representatives such as E. von Braunmühl, H. von Schoenebeck, H. Ostermeyer, W. Hinte, and C. Rochefort. Antipedagogy, in various forms, is particularly widespread, especially in European countries.

Heinrich Kupffer's 1974 essay, "Antipsychiatrie und Antipädagogik", was among the early works introducing the term 'antipedagogical.' Heinrich Kupffer, a social pedagogy lecturer at the University of Education in Kiel, extended his criticism from psychiatry to pedagogy. In 1970, von Braunmühl and others in Wiesbaden founded the 1st Antipedagogical Club Kinderhaus e. V (1st APC Kinderhaus), attempting to put the antipedagogical movement into practice. Ekkehard von Braunmühl's book, "Antipedagogic - Studies on the Abolition of Education," published in 1975, further solidified the foundations of antipedagogy. According to von Braunmühl, education and pedagogy are not only unnecessary but also "unfavorable for children, people, and life." He views parenting as an act of contempt, subjugation, and injustice against children, refusing to issue orders or prohibitions. Von Braunmühl critiques the 'pedagogical attitude,' inexorably linked to the alleged 'need for guidance' in children, arguing that education is a designation "exclusively for planned, intentional actions aimed at the child as an object". He highlights the misconception of equating parenting with learning, emphasizing the distinction between activities by adults against children and activities by children themselves.

== See also ==
- Pedagogy
- Antiscience
- Anti-psychiatry
- Anti-intellectualism
- Democratic education
- Anti-oppressive education
