= East End Park, Leeds =

Area of Leeds, West Yorkshire, England

Coordinates: 53.7943°N 1.5256°W

East End Park
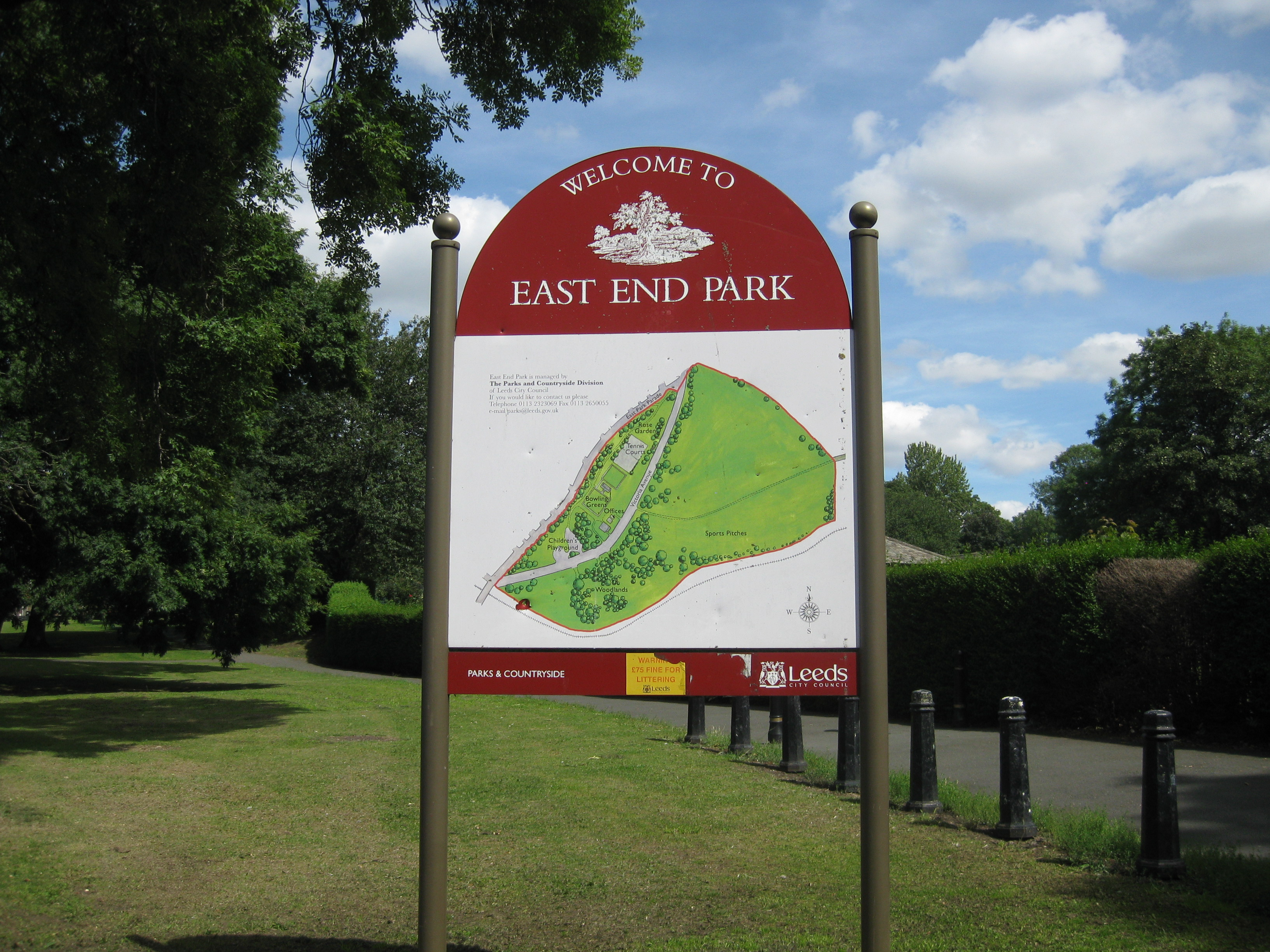
- East End Park welcome sign

- Location within West Yorkshire
- Metropolitan borough: City of Leeds
- Metropolitan county: West Yorkshire
- Region: Yorkshire and the Humber
- Country: England
- Sovereign state: United Kingdom
- Post town: LEEDS
- Postcode district: LS9
- Dialling code: 0113
- Police: West Yorkshire
- Fire: West Yorkshire
- Ambulance: Yorkshire

East End Park is an inner city area of east Leeds, West Yorkshire, England. It is situated between Burmantofts to the north west, Harehills to the north east (although not a direct neighbour), Halton Moor to the east, Richmond Hill to the west and Cross Green to the south west. It blends into the Halton Moor/Osmondthorpe area and is 1 mile to the east of Leeds city centre in the LS9 Leeds postcode area.

== General description ==
The area is situated in the vicinity of the A64 York Road, east Leeds' main thoroughfare, and is also home to a large park dating back from Victorian times which was purchased by Leeds City Council in the late 19th century, when it was waste land. Housing in the area is made up of nineteenth-century through terraced housing, some back-to-back terraced housing. Semi-detached and detached houses are also found in the area. Many of the back-to-back terraced houses in the area were due to be demolished as part of the £1.3 billion EASEL regeneration scheme in east and south-east Leeds. However these plans were withdrawn in 2010 with Leeds City Council citing the recession debilitating the private sector's ability to build as the main reason.

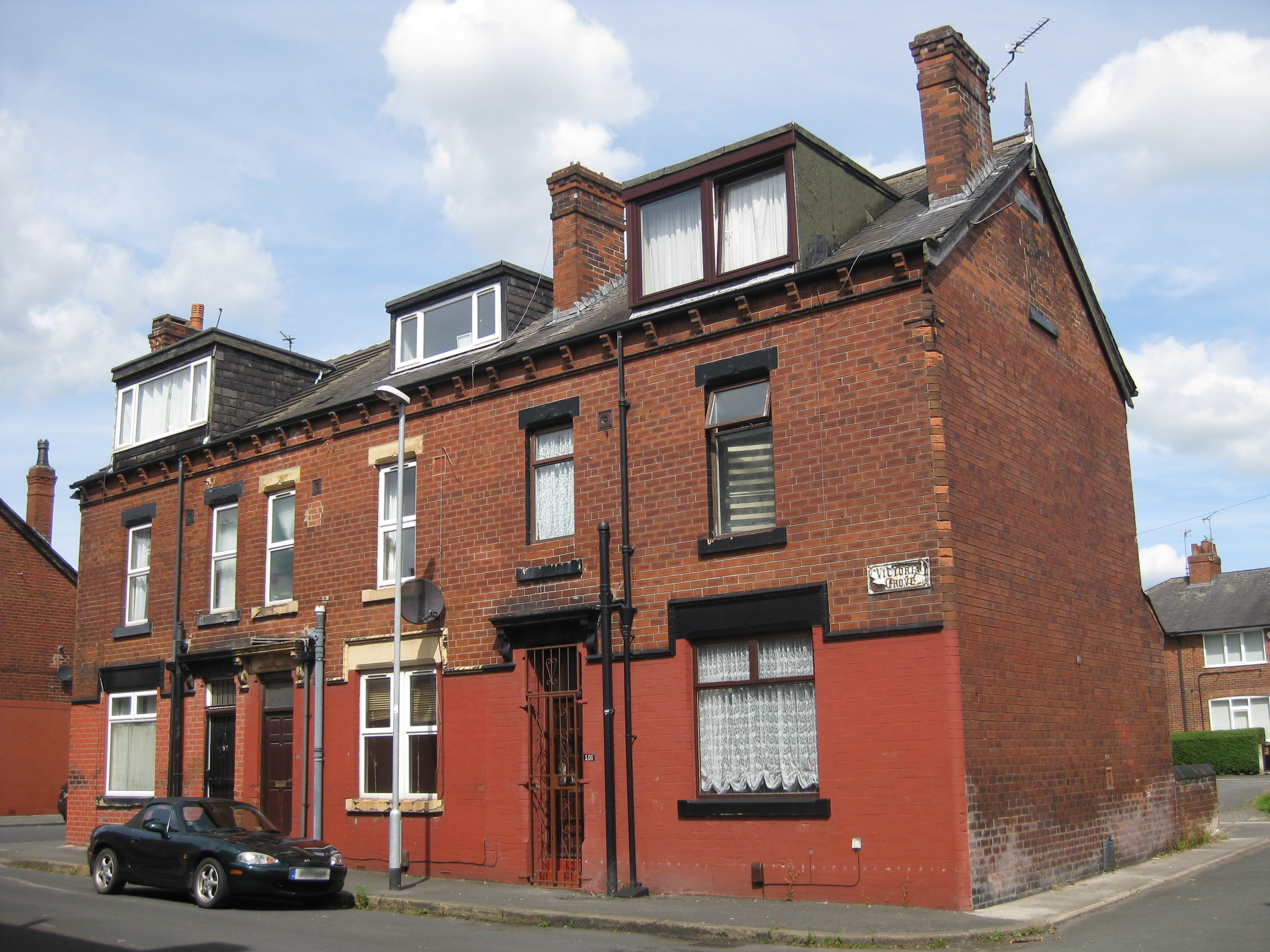
Older street-fronted terrace. House pictured known as the McMansion.

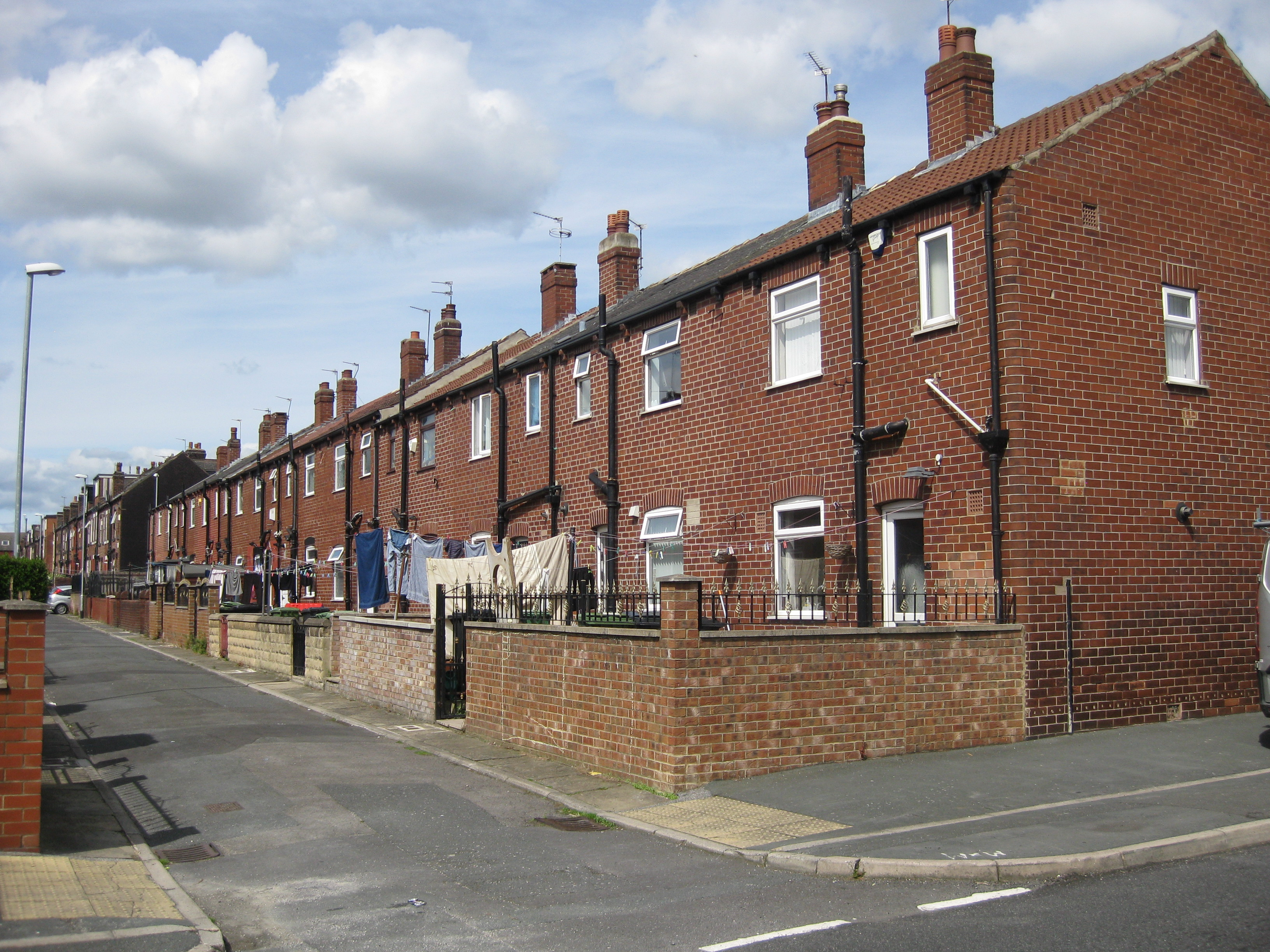
Rear gardens of terrace houses

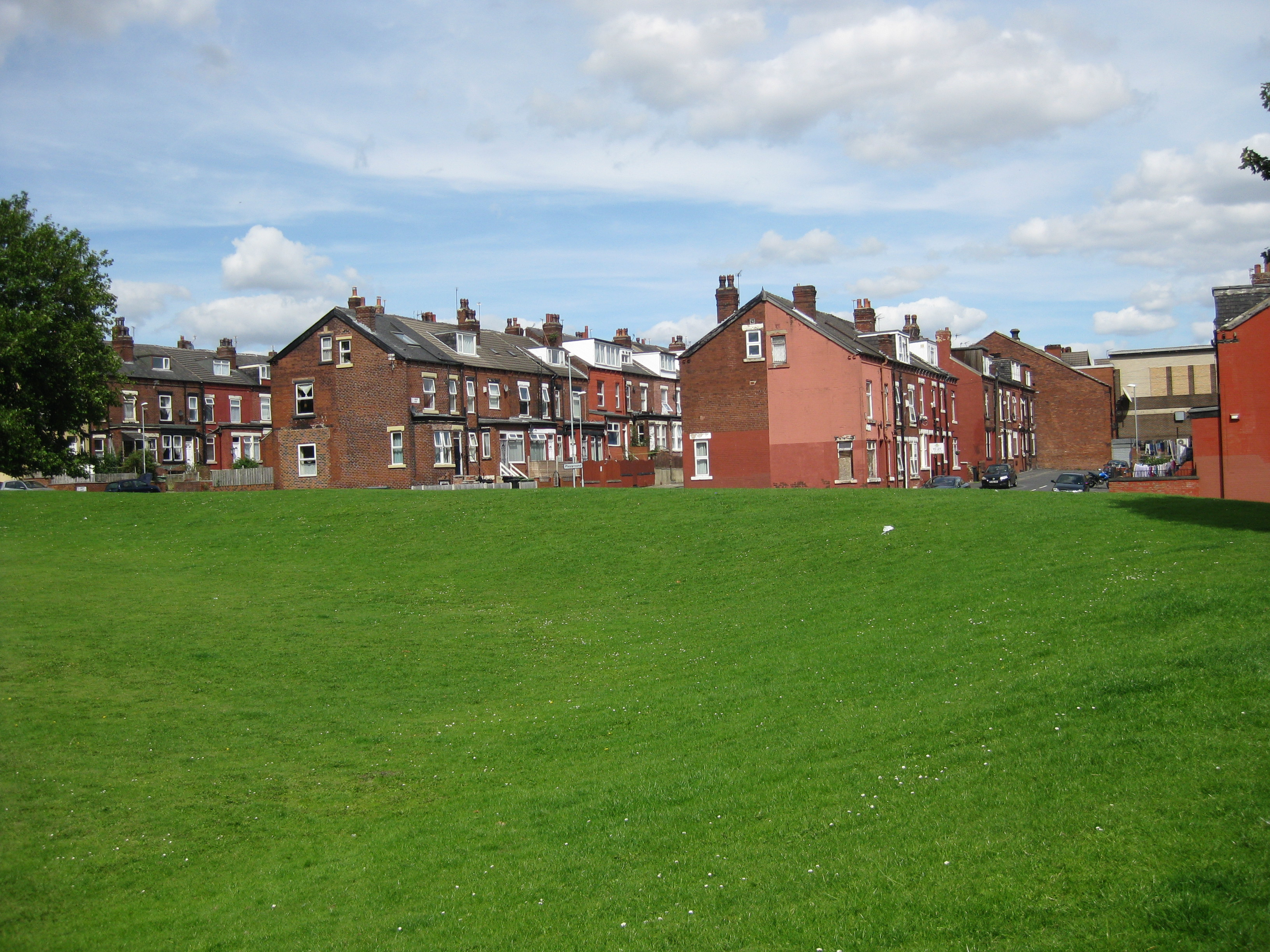
Back-to-back terraces

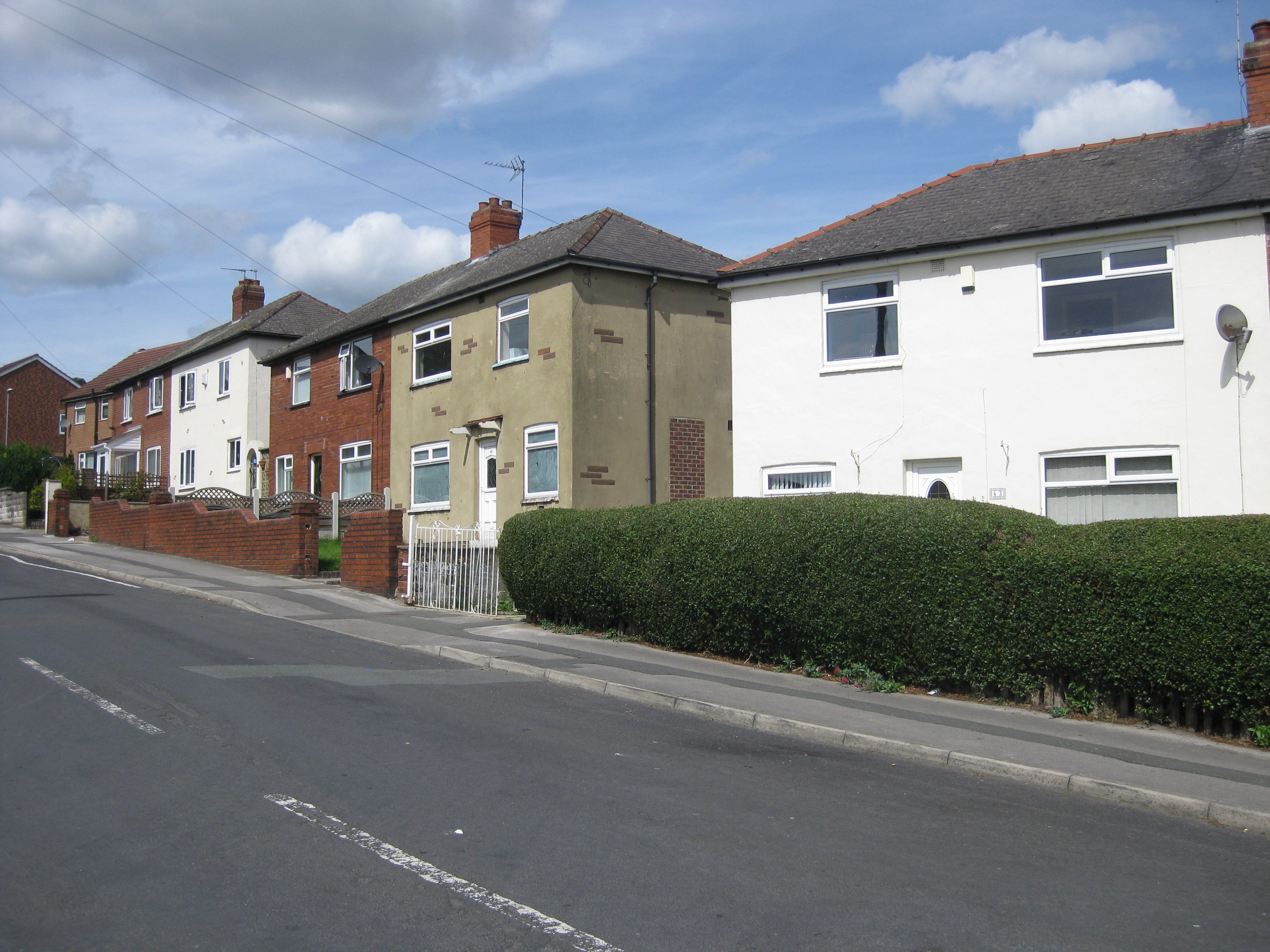
Semi-detached houses

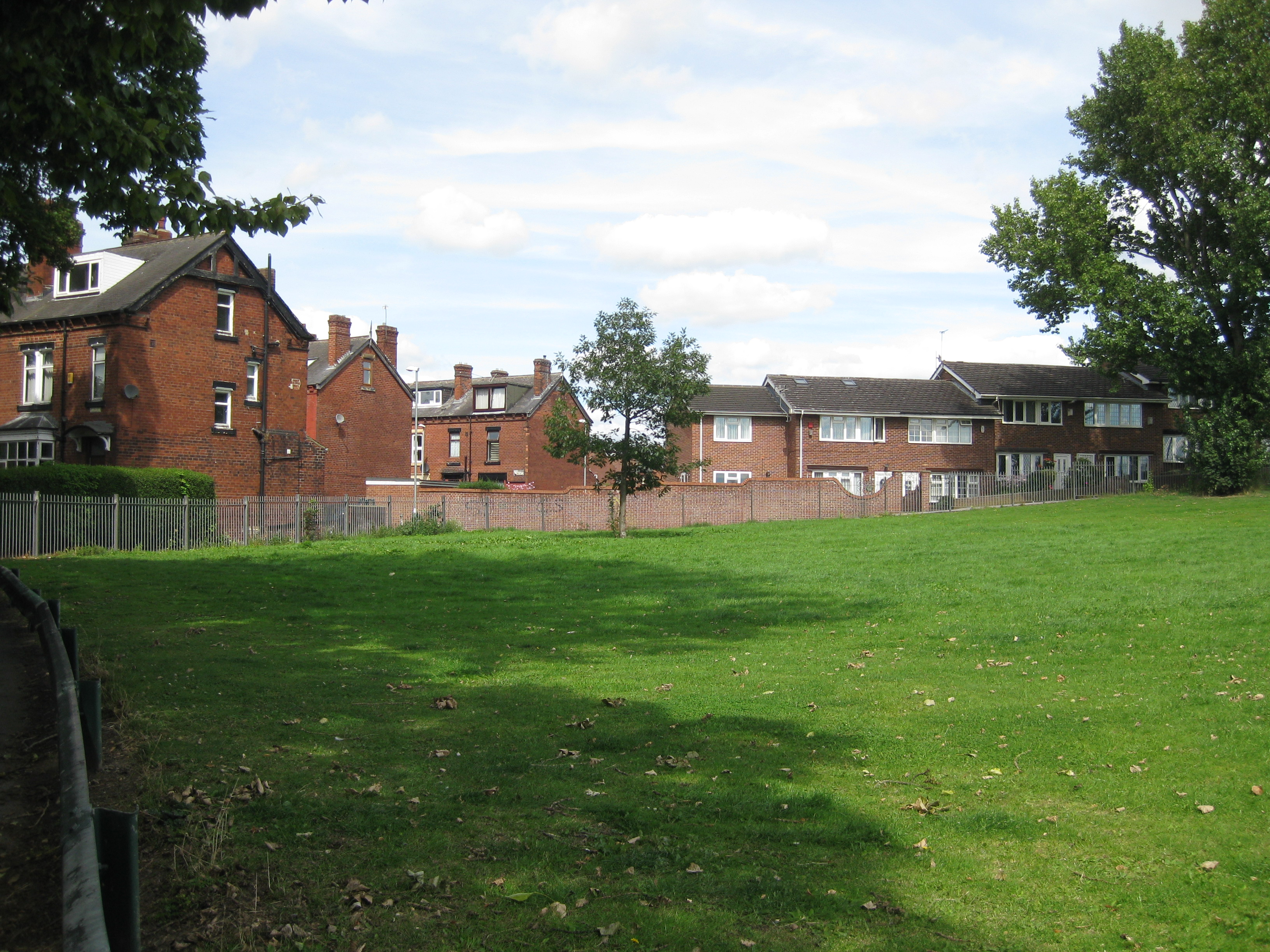
Old and new houses by the park

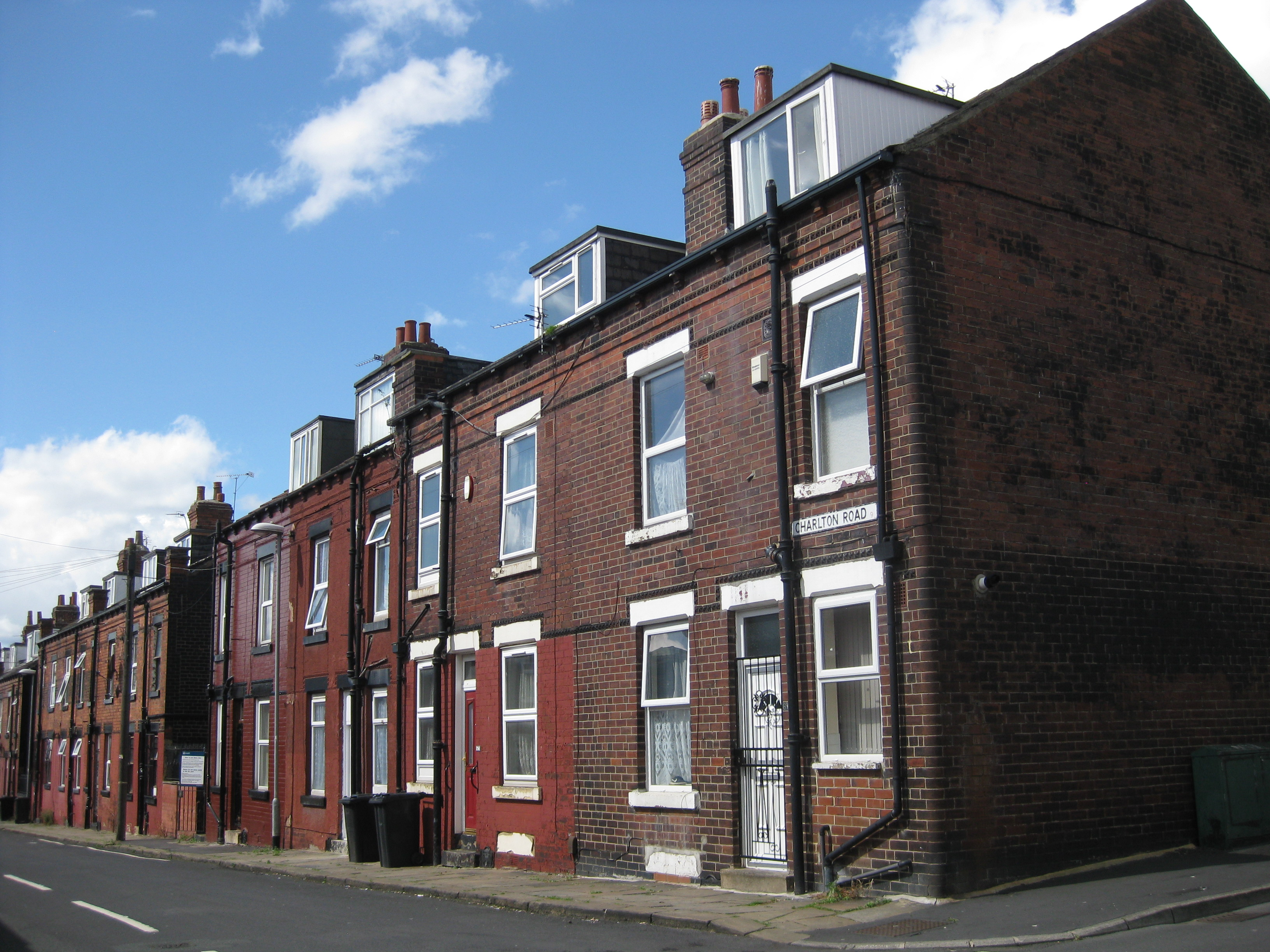
Charlton Road, one of several streets with Charlton in the name.

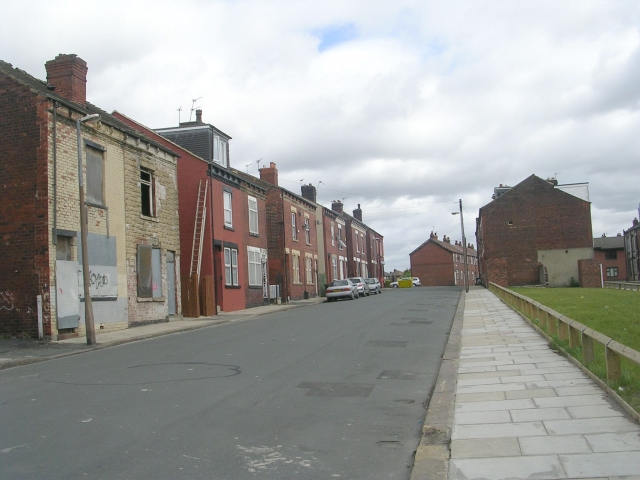
Demolition on St Hilda's Crescent

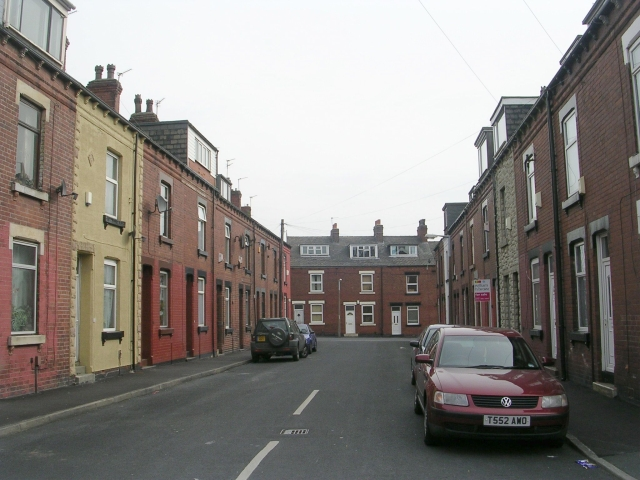
Through-terraced on St Elmo Grove

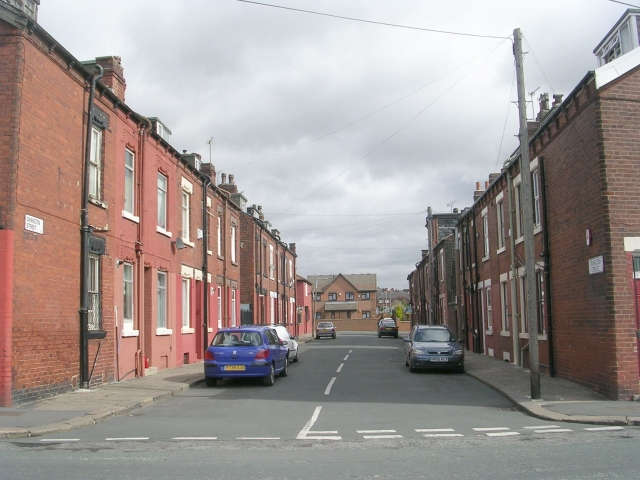
Back-to-back terraces on Charlton Street

Crime is unevenly distributed across East End Park. The Glensdales, Templeviews and Charltons are a small cluster of predominately back-to-back streets noted for the majority of the area's crime and have subsequently become a priority area of West Yorkshire Police, crime in the rest of the estate is much less common. The same group of streets are a focus of some regeneration in the area.

The area is home to one of the major Irish communities in Leeds, and is home to the prestigious music venue 'Leeds Irish Centre', the first purpose built Irish Centre in Britain. The centre opened on 20 January 1970, although the official opening ceremony was held on 8 June 1970. A blue plaque calls it "The Crucible of Darts", being the location for televised darts matches in 1973. There also a Buddhist temple in a former school by the park.

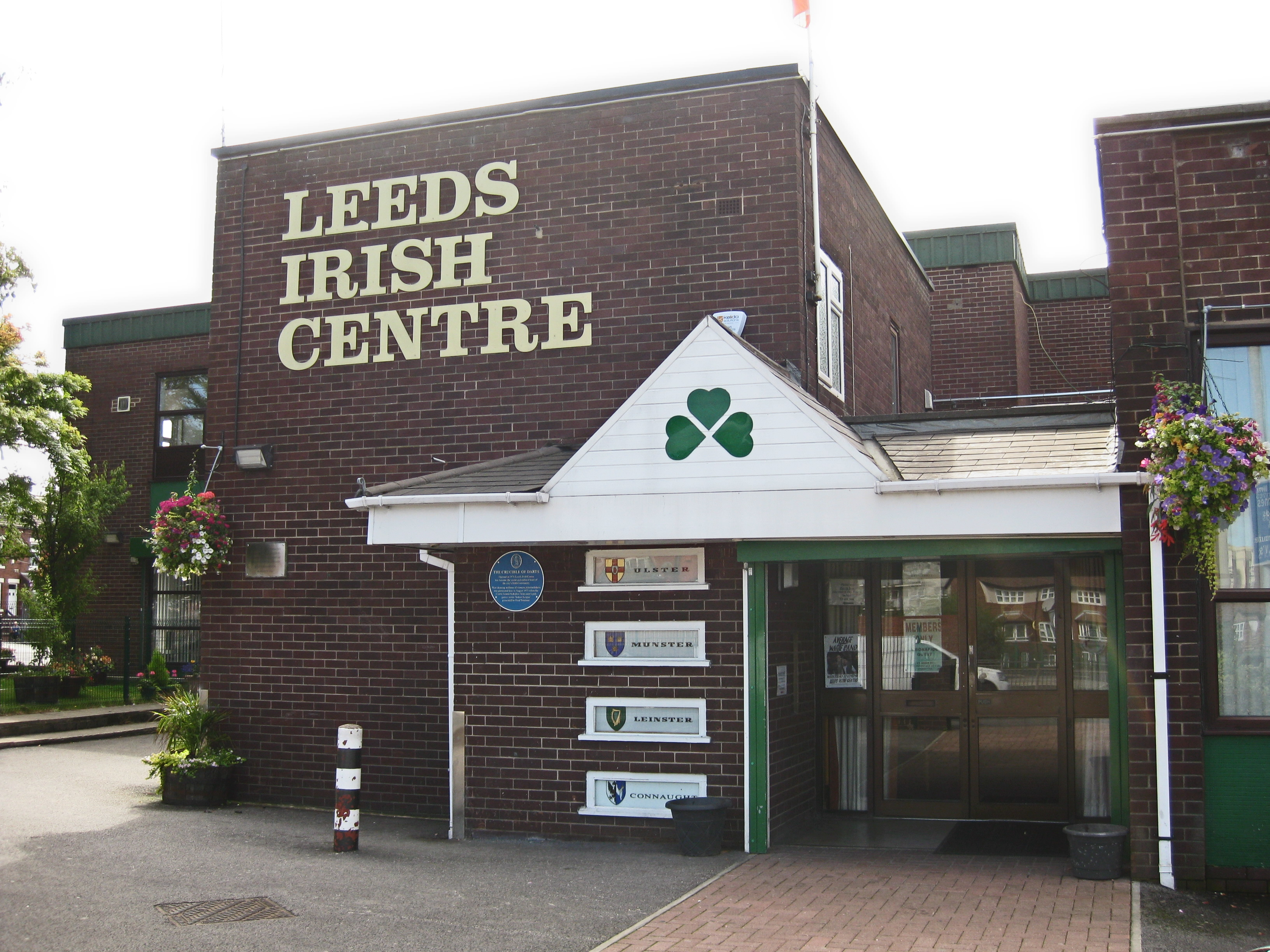
Leeds Irish Centre

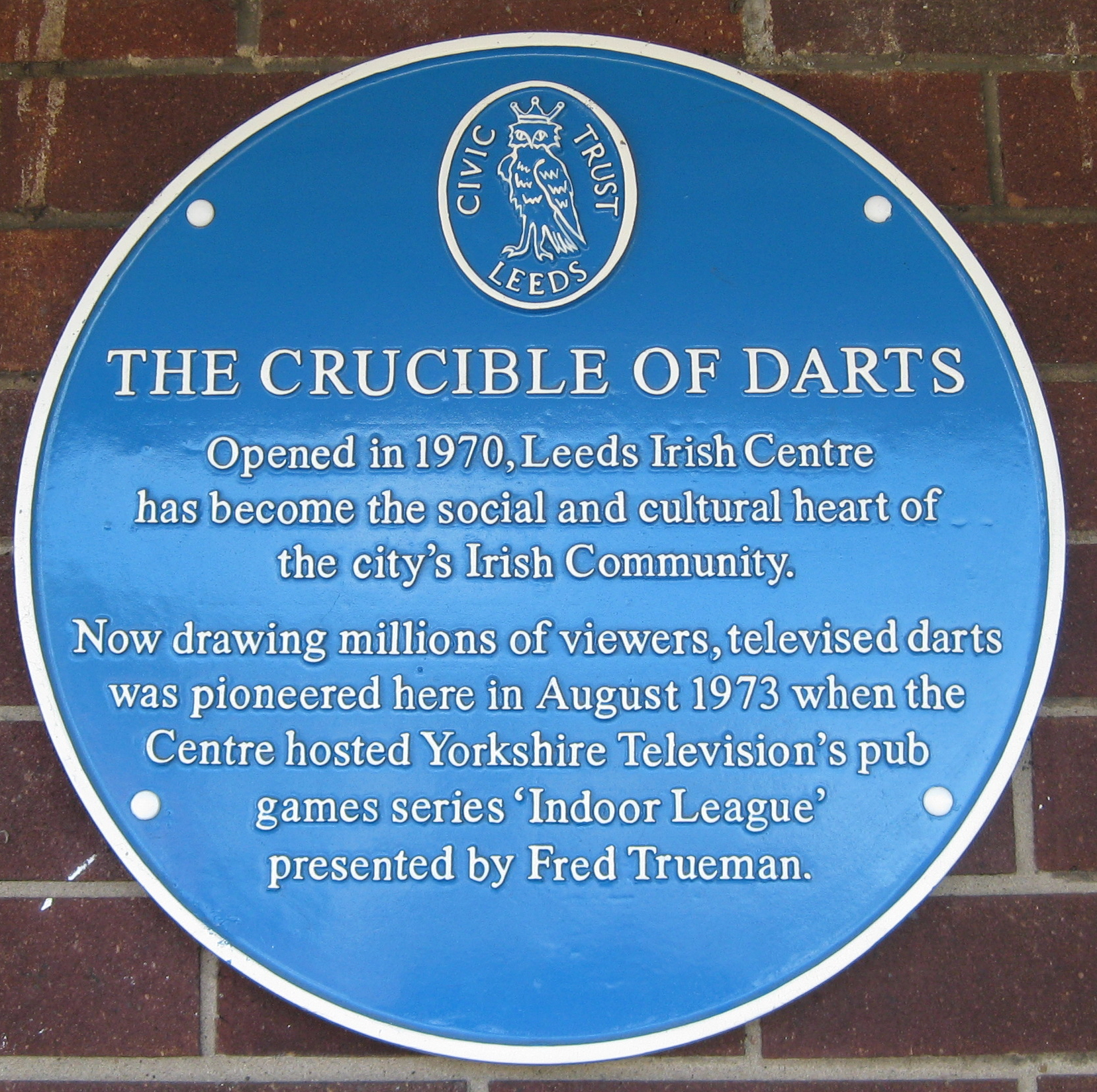
Blue Plaque: The Crucible of Darts

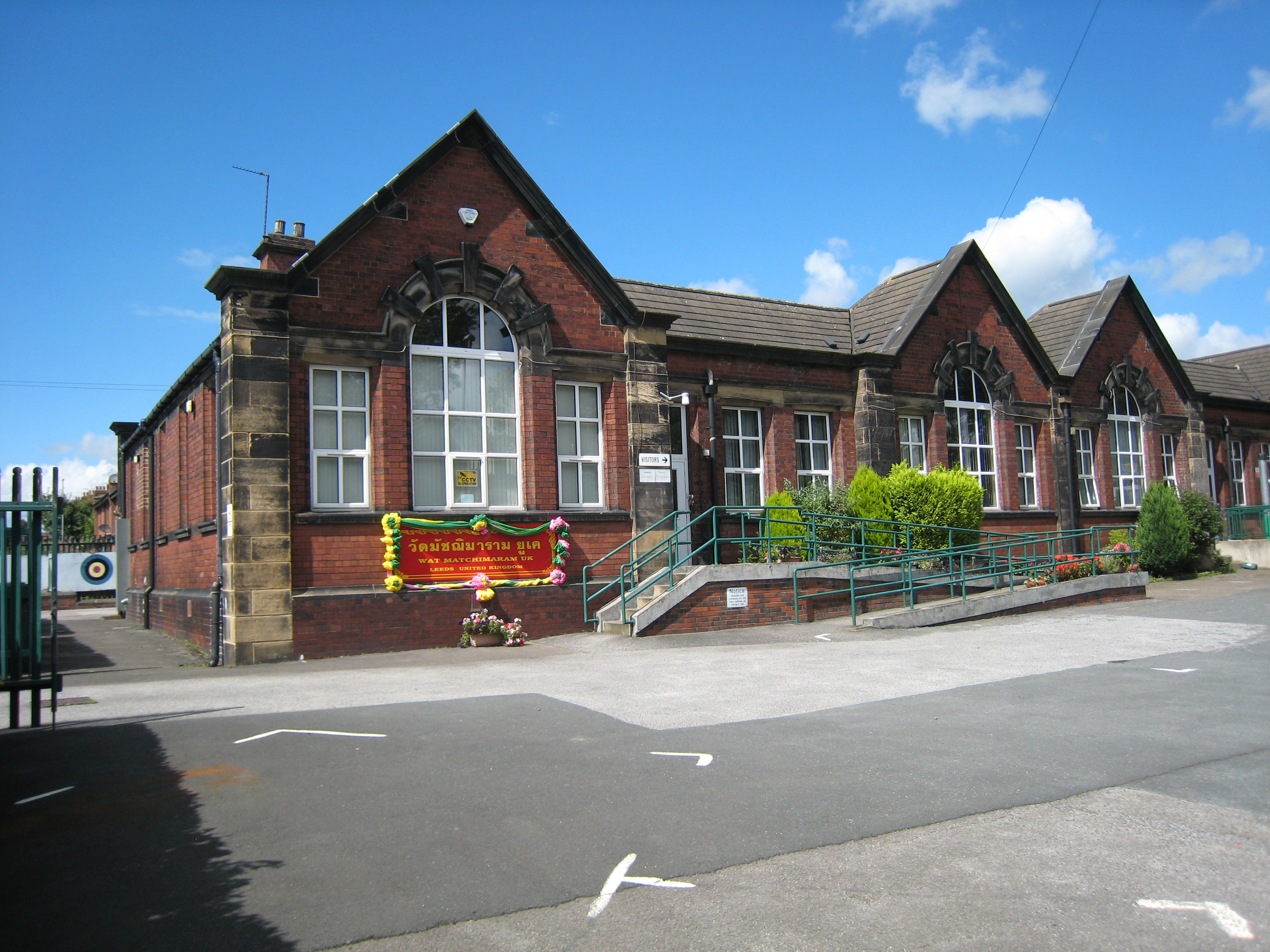
Wat Matchimaram: former school now Buddhist Temple

== The Park ==
East End Park was originally part of the grounds of a mansion, Osmondthorpe Hall (destroyed by fire in 1924), sold to the city in 1886. It is now managed by Parks and Countryside, part of the Learning and Leisure Department, Leeds City Council. It offers has bowling greens, tennis courts, football pitches and a basketball court. There are plenty of open spaces in the park and areas of well established woodland. There are also seating areas amongst rose and shrub beds. The park hosts many events throughout the year including an annual bonfire and fun fair which attracts up to 10,000 visitors. A tennis camp is held each August for young people.

In March 2009, Trees for Cities and Leeds City Council planted 3,000 whips at East End Park in order to create new areas of urban woodland to help screen the park from the railway line that runs behind it. The planting follows planting in 2007 when, with the help of the local community, 18 large trees were planted to replace those lost in September 2006 when a freak tornado struck the city.

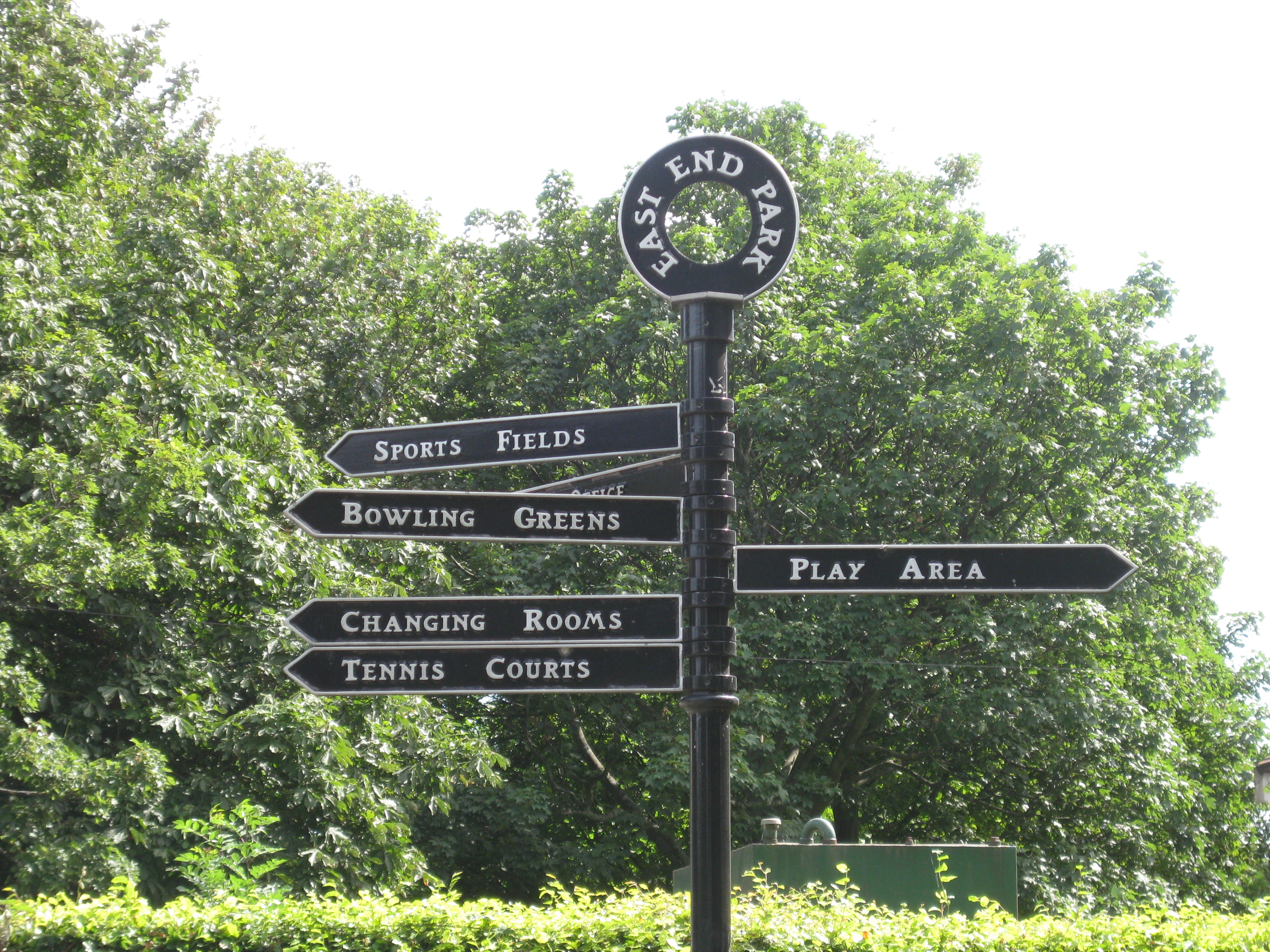
Park signpost

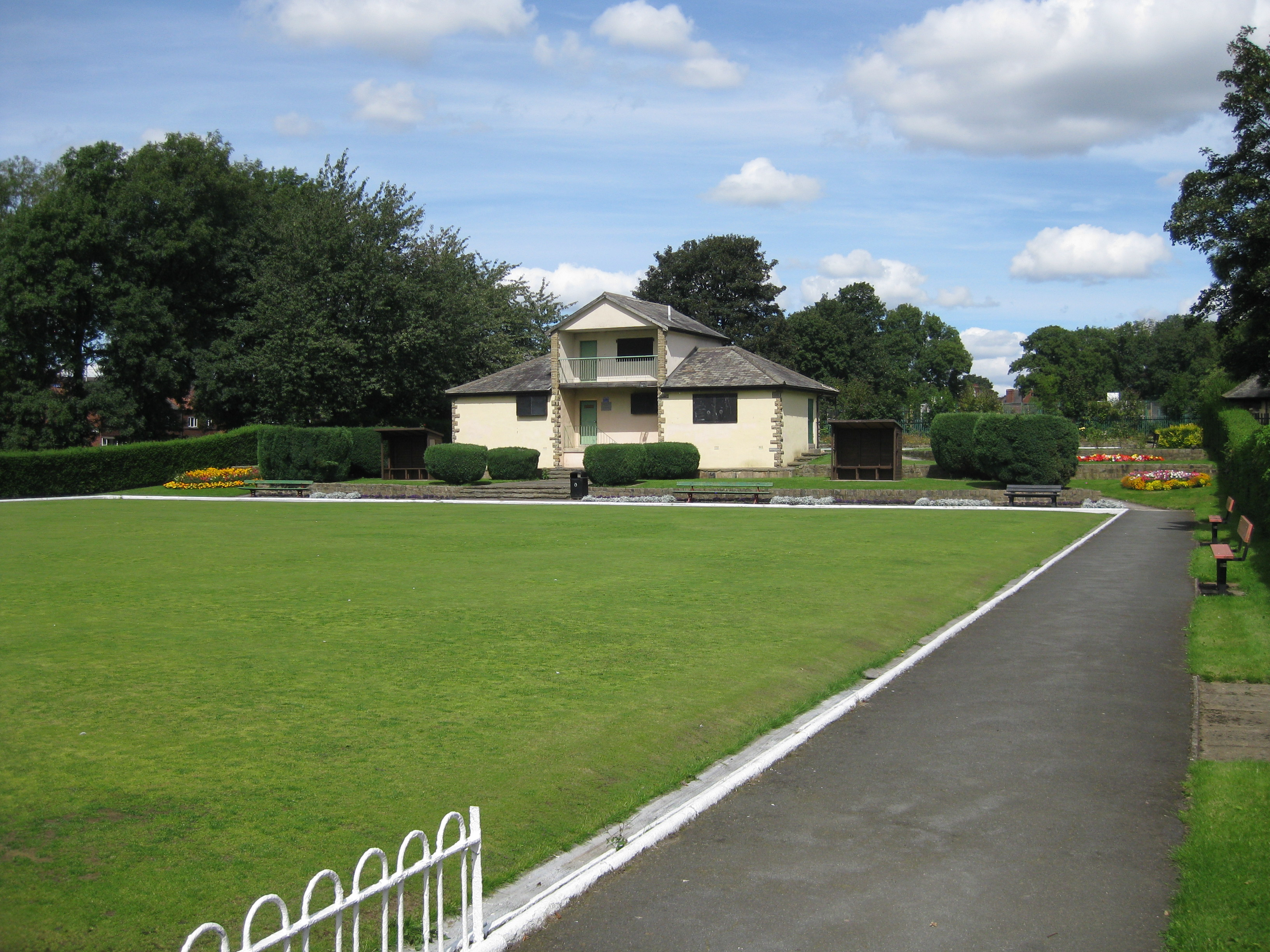
Bowling green

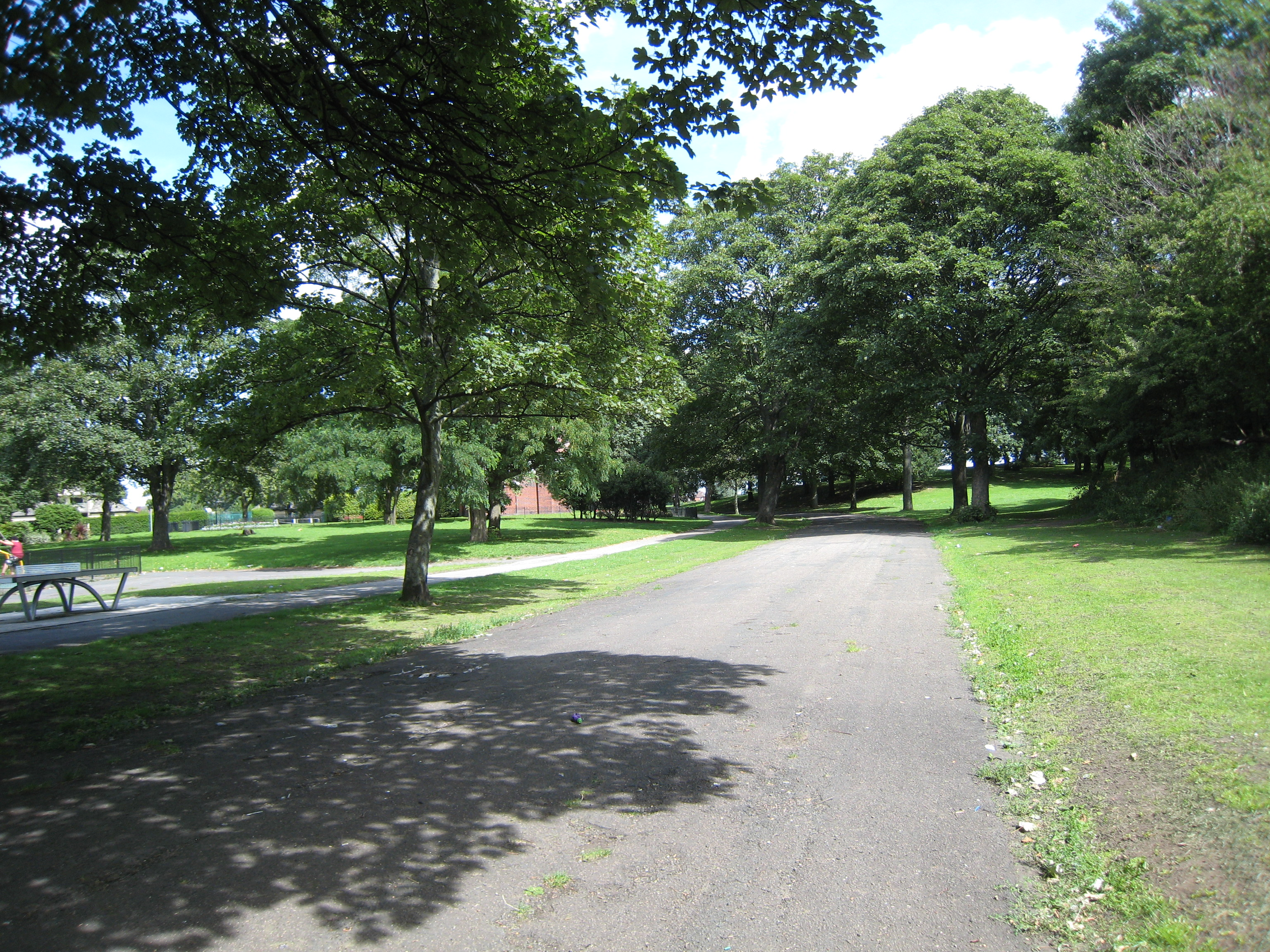
Victoria Avenue through the park

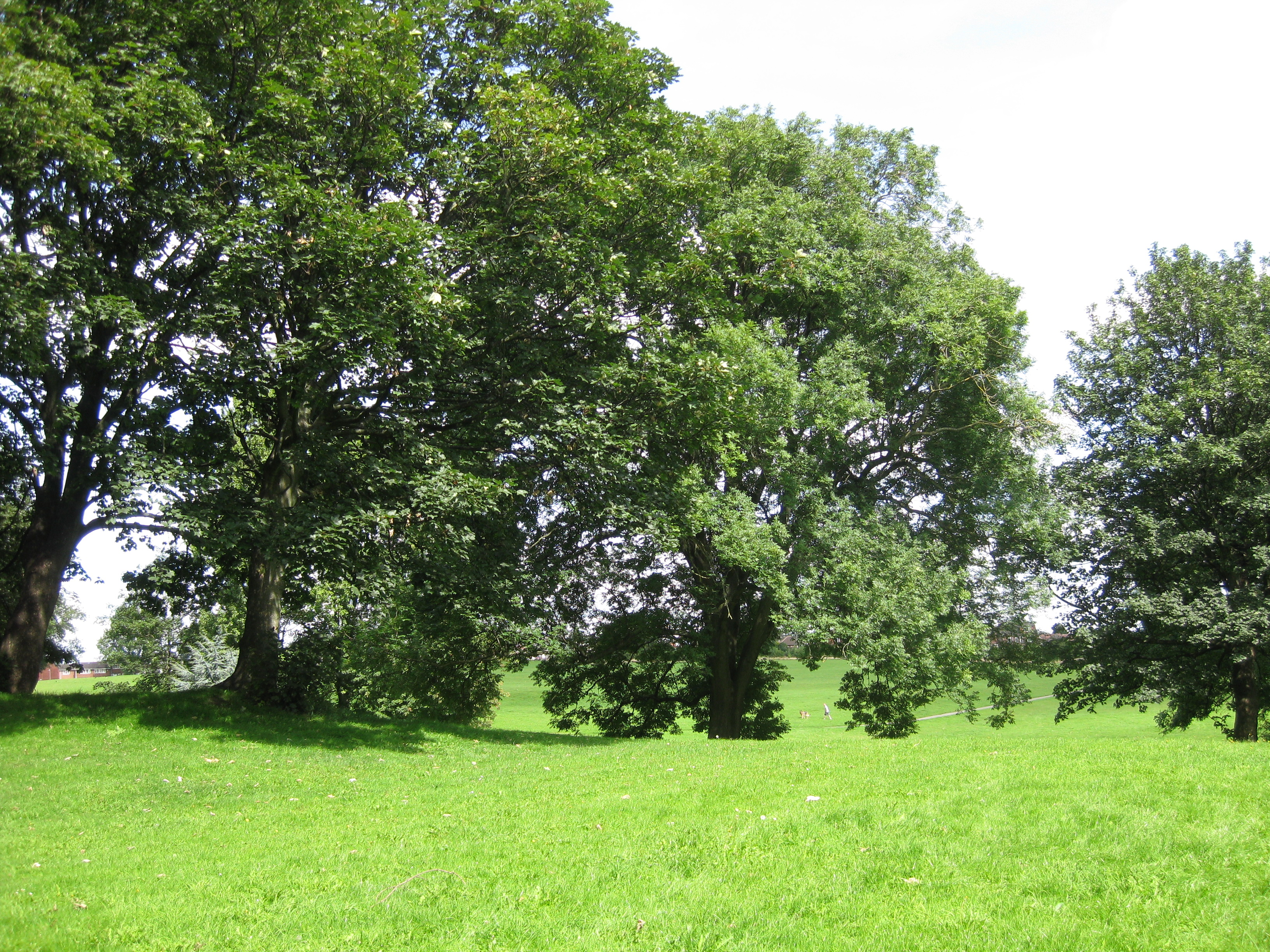
Footpath going East

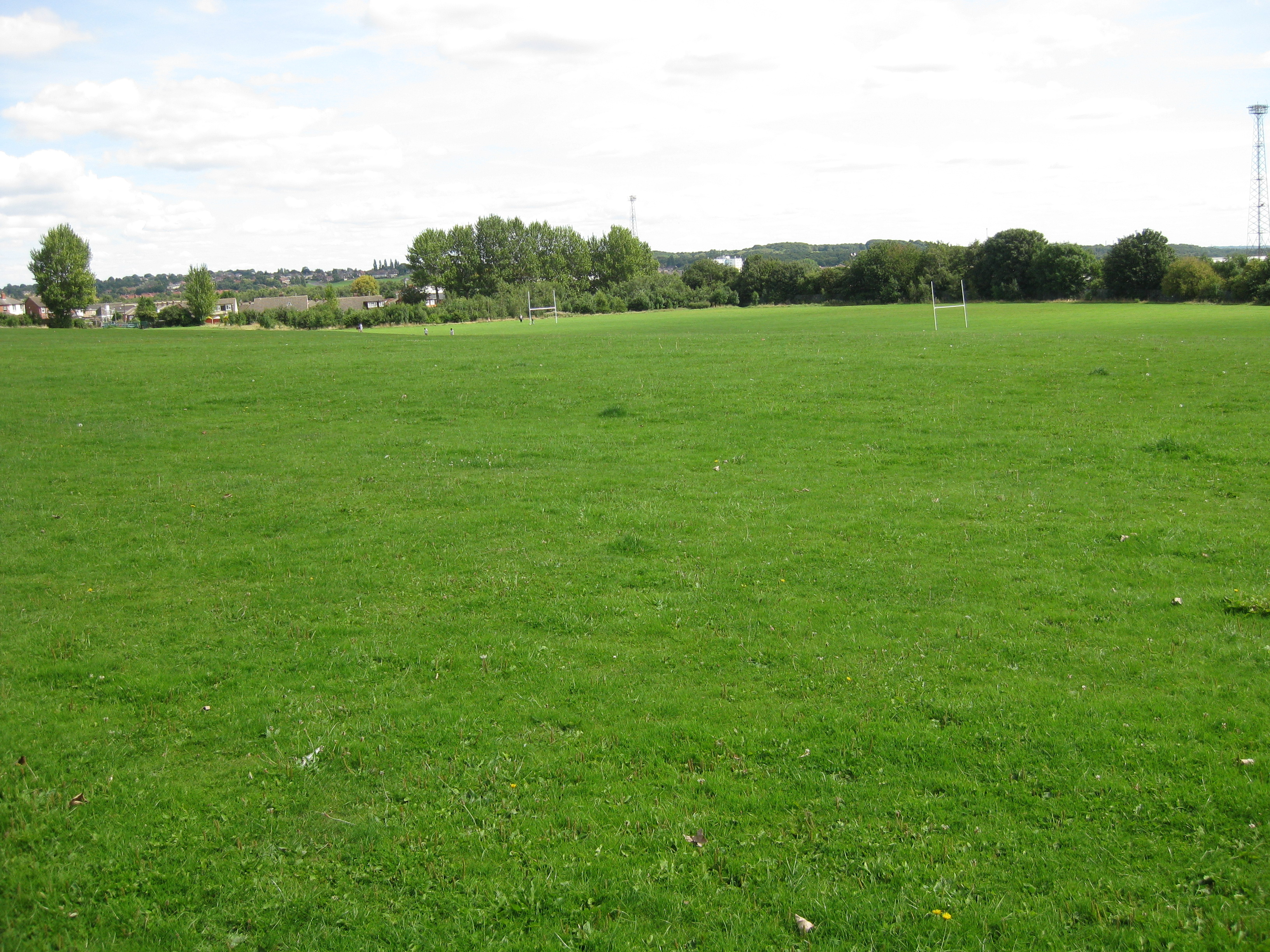
The main grassed area, with sports pitches in the distance

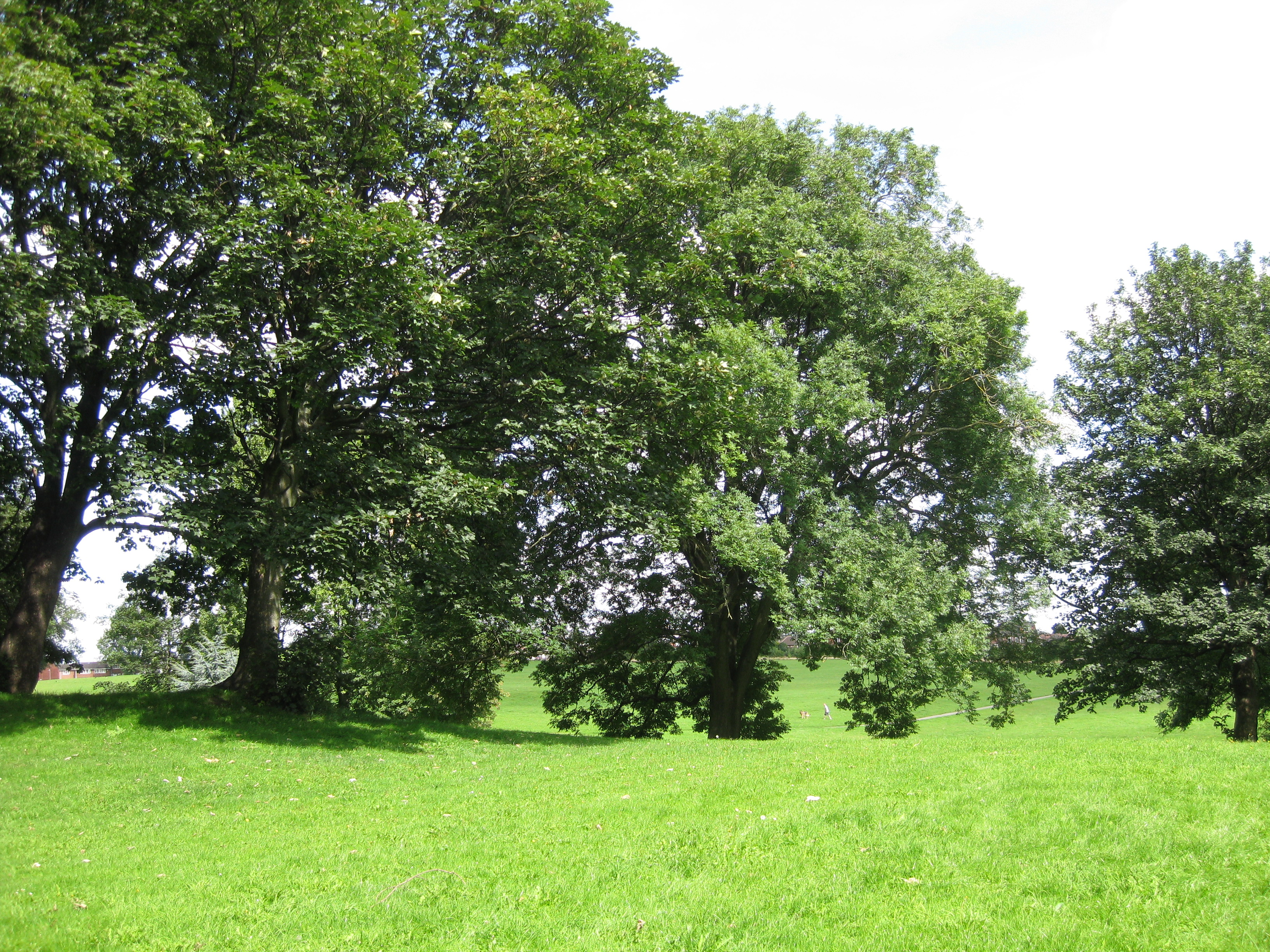
Part of the wooded area

== Transport ==
East End Park is situated in the vicinity of the A64 York Road, east Leeds' main thoroughfare, providing the area with a well established and reliable bus service. Most bus routes are operated by First Leeds and Arriva Yorkshire. The 19 and 19A run to Garforth, Colton, Halton, the city centre, Headingley, West Park, Ireland Wood and Tinshill. The 5 runs to Halton Moor, Osmondthorpe and the city centre. The 40 and 40A run to Seacroft, Swarcliffe, Cross Gates, Halton and the city centre. The 56 runs to Whinmoor, Seacroft, Killingbeck, Hyde Park, the University of Leeds, Headingley and Moor Grange. The 163 and 166 run from the city centre to Castleford, as well as services that run along the A64 to the east coast. The closest railway station is Leeds railway station.
