= West Park, Leeds =

Suburb of Leeds, England

Coordinates: 53.8336°N 1.5989°W

West Park
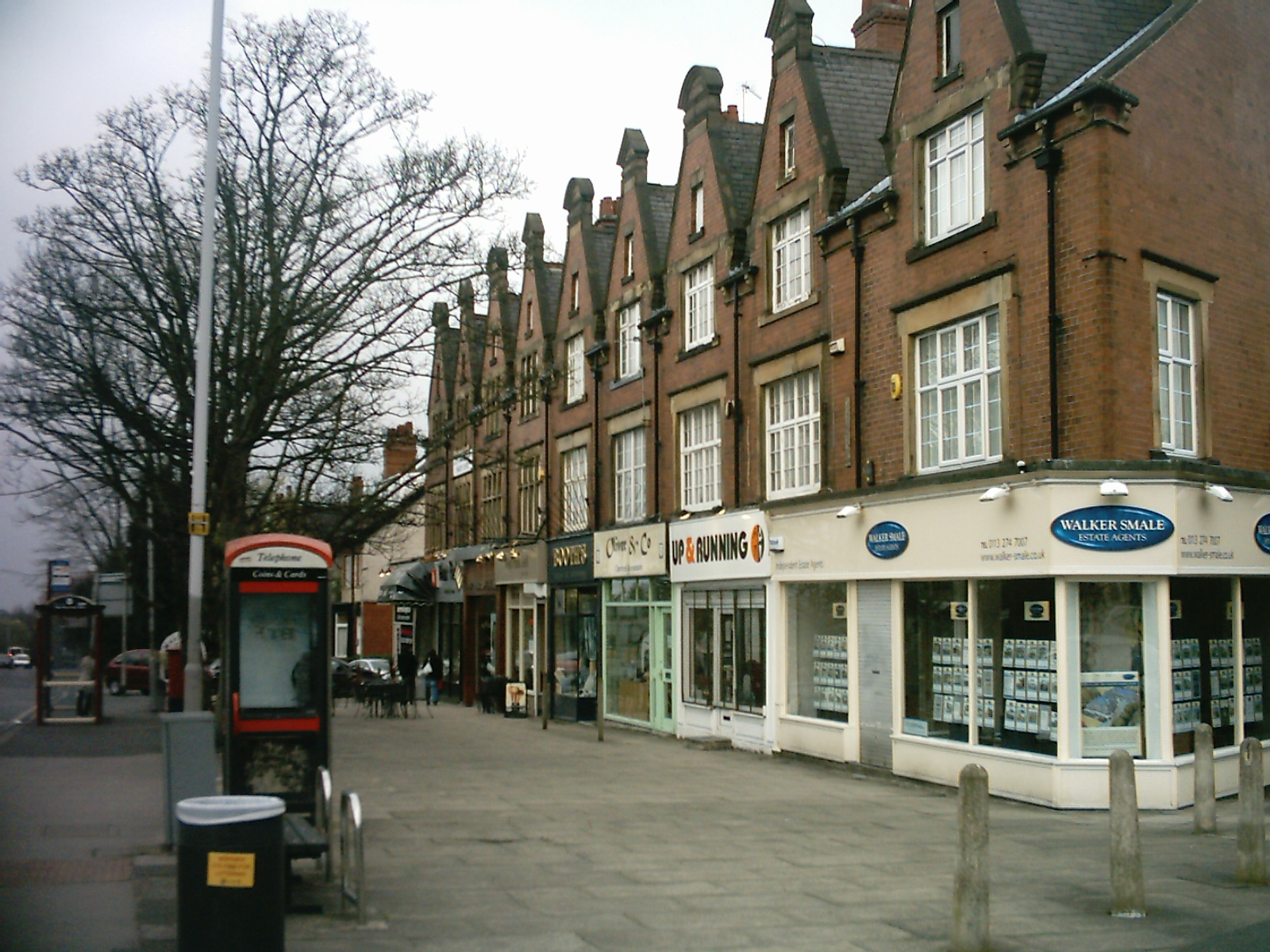
- Shops on Otley Road

- Location within West Yorkshire
- OS grid reference: SE260378
- Metropolitan borough: City of Leeds
- Metropolitan county: West Yorkshire
- Region: Yorkshire and the Humber
- Country: England
- Sovereign state: United Kingdom
- Post town: LEEDS
- Postcode district: LS16
- Dialling code: 0113
- Police: West Yorkshire
- Fire: West Yorkshire
- Ambulance: Yorkshire
- UK Parliament: Leeds North West

West Park is a suburb of north-west Leeds, West Yorkshire, England, north of Headingley. It is a mixed area of private suburban housing and suburban council estates. The name derives from its main park (approximately 550 yards (500 m) north–south by 330 yards (300 m) east–west) containing playing fields together with a conservation area of grassy meadow ending in woodland. The largest housing estate in West Park is Moor Grange.

The majority of the area sits in the Weetwood ward of Leeds City Council, except for the south west corner sitting in the neighbouring Kirkstall ward.

== Governance ==
The south west corner (with an eastern border of Spen Lane and the A6120 Leeds Outer Ring Road to the north) of West Park lies in the Kirkstall ward and the rest of the suburb sits in the Weetwood ward. As a result, West Park is split between two parliamentary constituencies with the Leeds North West constituency including Weetwood ward (served by Labour Co-operative Member of Parliament, Alex Sobel) and Leeds West constituency (represented by fellow Labour MP Rachel Reeves) covering Kirkstall ward.

It has the postcode of LS16.

== Geography ==
The West Park district is approximately four miles north west of Leeds city centre. Its boundaries are approximately the A660 Otley Road to the east, the A6120 Leeds Outer Ring Road to the North, the Harrogate Line railway to the West, and the Queenswood Drive / Spen Lane intersection to the South.

== Amenities ==
The amenities of West Park lie in two main areas, on Otley Road there are several shops, a post office, a laundrette, a specialist runners shop, an estate agency, Indian and Italian restaurants. There is also a nursery for children aged up to 5 years. The main parade of shops on Otley Road has Dutch fronts. There are amenities on the Moor Grange estate around Spen Lane and Butcher Hill, which include: Abbey Grange Church of England High School, St Chad's Church of England Primary School, St Andrew's church which also houses the offices of STEP (Supporting The Elderly People), a doctor's surgery, a post office, a beautician, hair salons, cafés, a Co-op supermarket, newsagents, takeaways, a pet shop, a charity shop, a window and glazing store, a florist, a launderette, and a public house called 'The Dalesman'. Lawnswood School lies in between West Park and Lawnswood. West Park lies close to Headingley and Horsforth which have larger local centres. The West Park Centre (an educational facility in the premises of the former West Park High School) was demolished in 2014 after the building was declared unsafe and deemed too expensive to repair.

== Transport ==
West Park is between the A660 and the A65, with the Leeds Outer Ring Road running to the north of the area. The Leeds-Harrogate railway line runs through Moor Grange, but there is no station, the nearest to the south is Headingley and Horsforth to the north. Many bus routes run through the area, providing regular services to Leeds city centre, Headingley and Horsforth.

== Housing ==
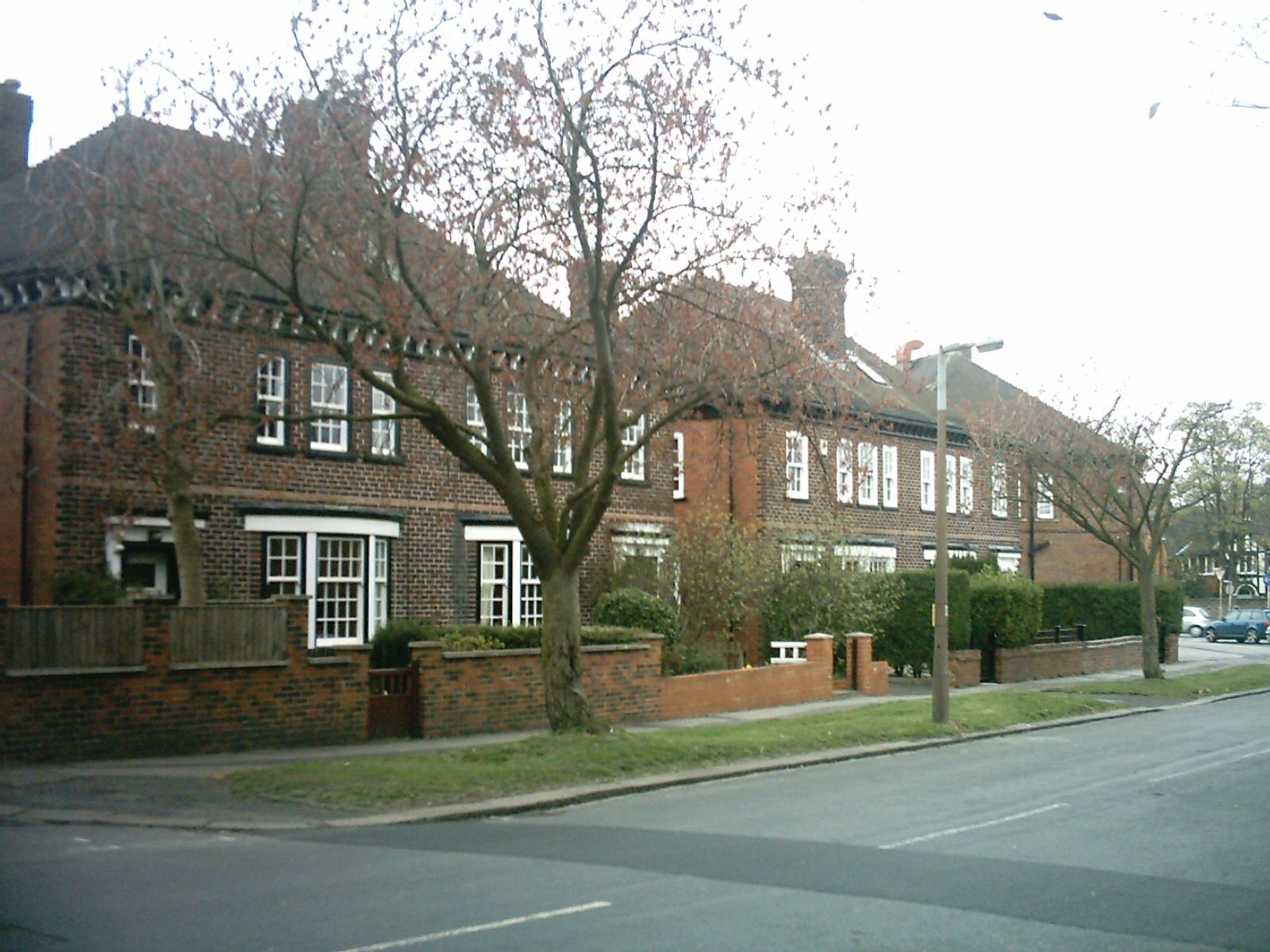
Houses on Spen Road

West Park has an area of early 20th century private housing between Otley Road and Spen Lane, mainly large detached and semi detached houses. The streets here are mainly tree-lined and have wide pavements. There are also some older Victorian buildings around Otley Road, some of which have been divided into flats. The houses towards Otley Road are generally older and larger than those towards Spen Lane. The private housing generally lies to the East of West Park, where it gives way to Far Headingley to the South and Lawnswood to the North. Most of the private housing in West Park lie in a Conservation area.

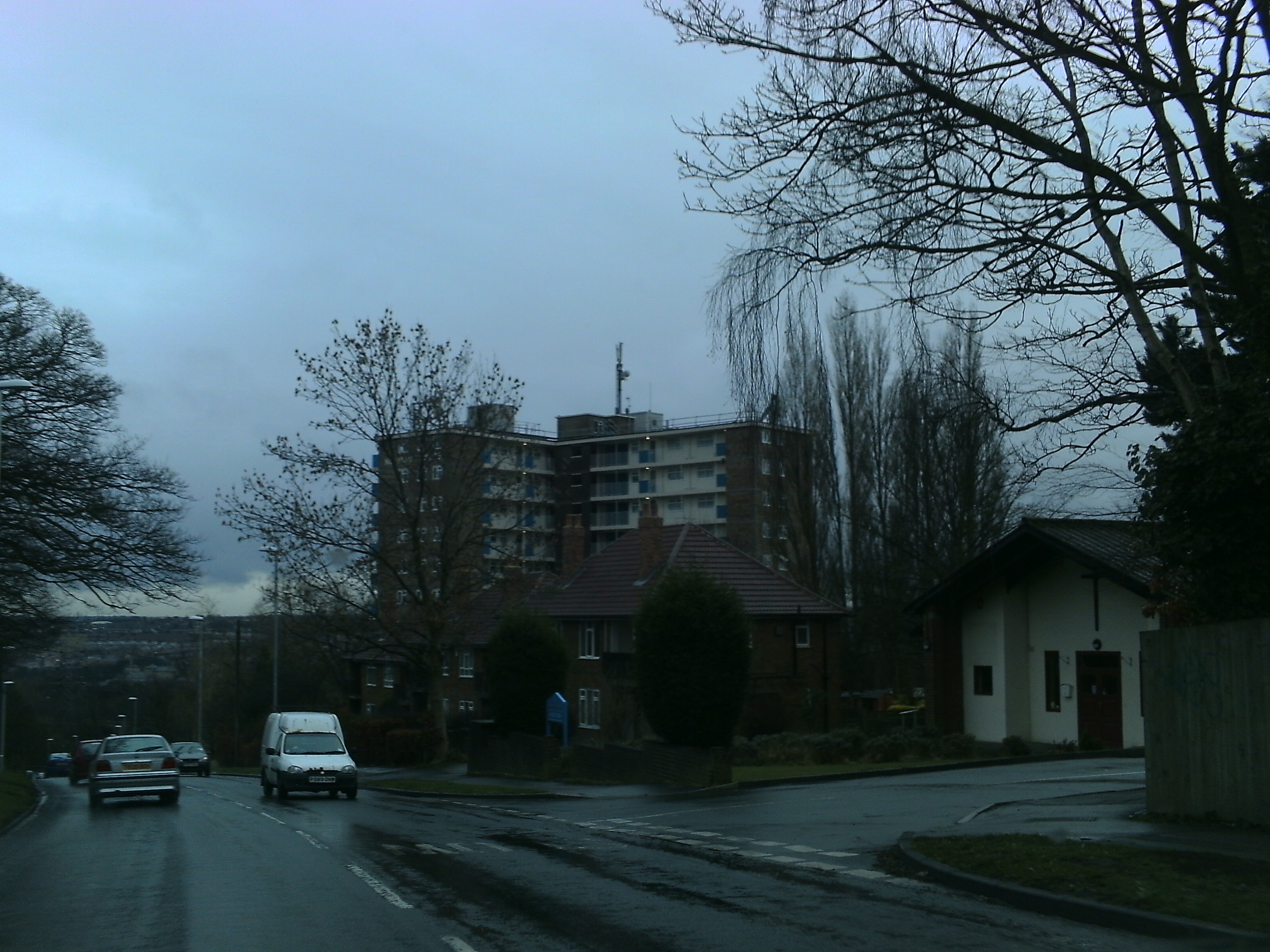
Norman Towers

Moor Grange Estate is a 1950s-built council estate, on reclaimed farm land called 'Old Farm', together with a more affluent estate of predominantly large semi and detached housing between Spen Lane and the A660 Otley Road. The smaller Spen Estate is south of Butcher Hill. The Moor Grange area was used for filming The Beiderbecke Affair, using the Butcher Hill playing fields and the Clayton Grange flats. The crime rate in and around the Moor Grange and Spen Estates is generally lower than other council estates and house prices are similar to other North Leeds suburbs such as Roundhay, Oakwood, Adel, and Horsforth.

== See also ==
- Listed buildings in Leeds (Weetwood Ward)
