= Moor Grange =

Housing estate in Leeds, England

Coordinates: 53.836000°N 1.606300°W

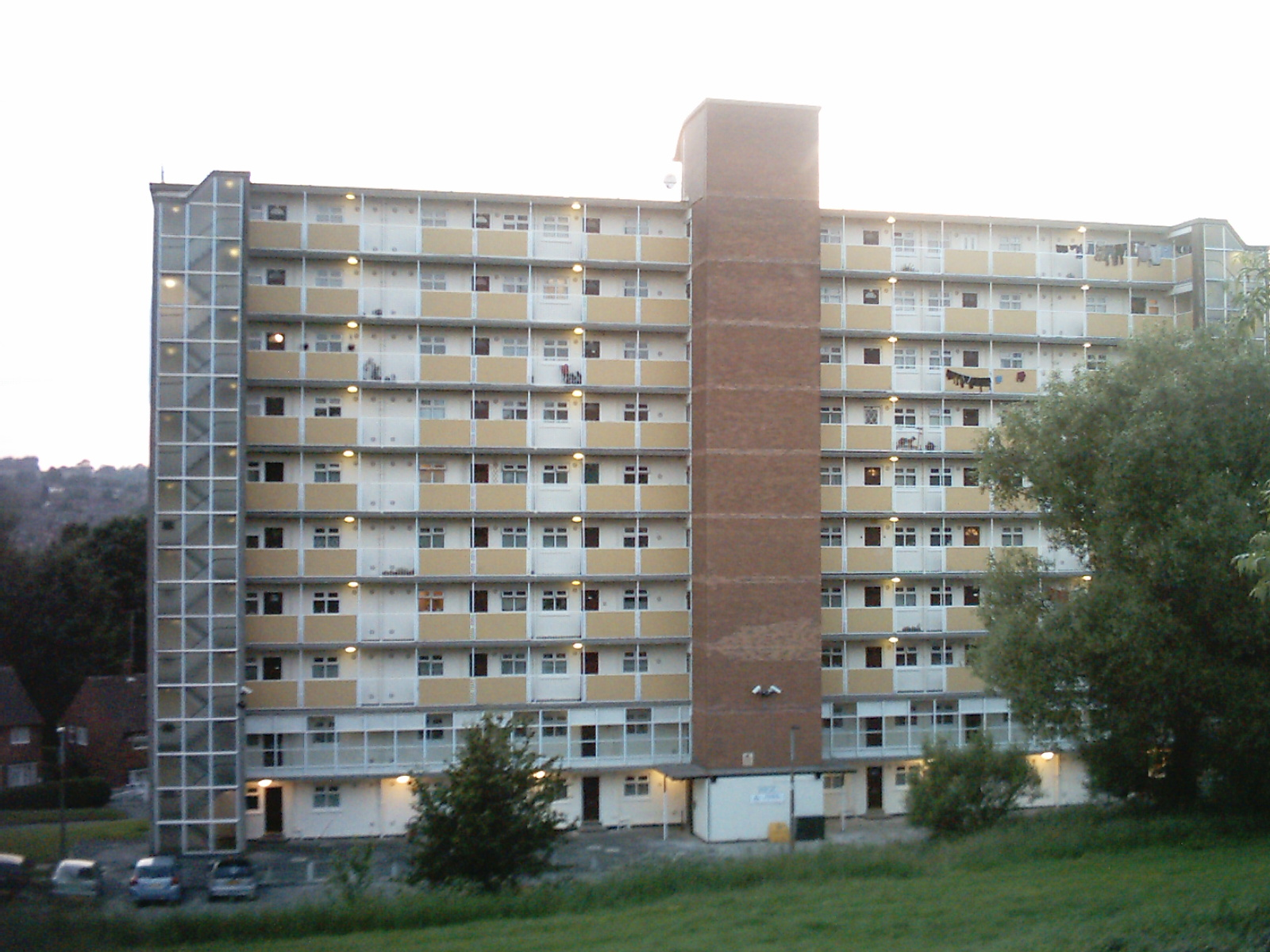
- Clayton Grange Flats, Moor Grange. (As used as 'The Multistory Block of Flats' in The Beiderbecke Affair).

- Location within West Yorkshire
- OS grid reference: SE260378
- Metropolitan borough: City of Leeds
- Metropolitan county: West Yorkshire
- Region: Yorkshire and the Humber
- Country: England
- Sovereign state: United Kingdom
- Post town: LEEDS
- Postcode district: LS16
- Dialling code: 0113
- Police: West Yorkshire
- Fire: West Yorkshire
- Ambulance: Yorkshire
- UK Parliament: Leeds North West

Moor Grange Estate is a housing estate in the West Park area of Leeds, West Yorkshire, England, which was built in the 1950s on reclaimed farmland. Work on the Moor Grange Estate began in 1955. It was originally owned by the local council, and was leased by the council to tenants as a council estate. Most of the housing on the estate is now privately owned. Moor Grange does not suffer the crime problems of other council estates (including the nearby Hawksworth Estate). House prices on the estate are high, and Moor Grange is considered a 'model council estate'. This may be due to the affluence of the area in which it is situated. Moor Grange backs onto the smaller Spen Estate which is another council estate in West Park. The Estate falls within the Kirkstall ward of the Leeds Metropolitan Council.

For details on the original planning of the estate see the Leodis website.

== Education ==
Moor Grange County Secondary School in 1973

Moor Grange was also the name of a boys county secondary school sited across the ring road. In the latter stages of its life it was renamed Moor Grange High School. It had a football pitch, a cricket square, a rugby field, an athletics area including long jump, high jump and pole vault, a running track of 440 yards and two tennis courts. It also boasted a gym and its assembly hall was frequently used as an additional gym. It has since been demolished and a HM Revenue and Customs House has been built on the site.

On the junction of Spen Lane and Butcher Hill was West Park County Secondary (Girls) School. This building has now been demolished and a new housing estate is in the process of being built.

Abbey Grange School is located on Butcher Hill near to Hawksworth. Abbey Grange School was named after a former Kirkstall Abbey Mannor. The School was opened on 11 October 1952 by the then Princess Royal Princess Mary, Countess of Harewood.

For a picture of the now demolished Moor Grange County Secondary School see the Leodis Database

== Buildings ==
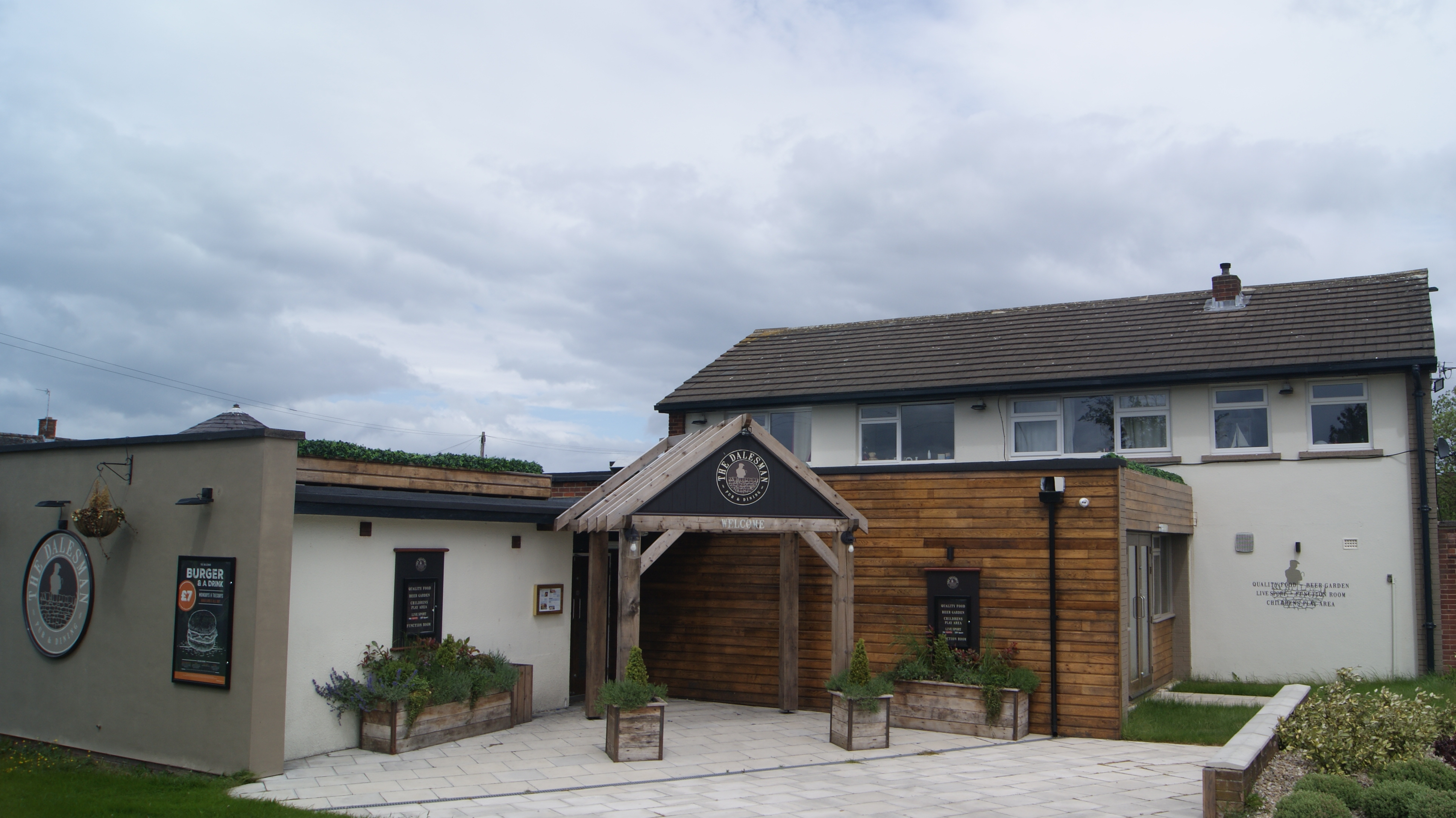
The Dalesman is the only pub on the estate and is seen here temporarily closed due to the COVID-19 pandemic.

Moor Grange has three rows of shops which include newsagents, charity shop, and grocers. It does not have a church but close by on West Park is the West Park United Reformed Church. Another church was built in the late 1960s called St Andrews on the junction of Butcher Hill and Old Oak Drive which is technically on the Spen estate. Details on the St Andrews web site . The row of shops that has the Co-op is technically on the Spen Estate and used to contain a Milk delivery dairy and in the 70's a Fish and Chip Shop opened which was formerly a butcher shop.

=== Housing ===
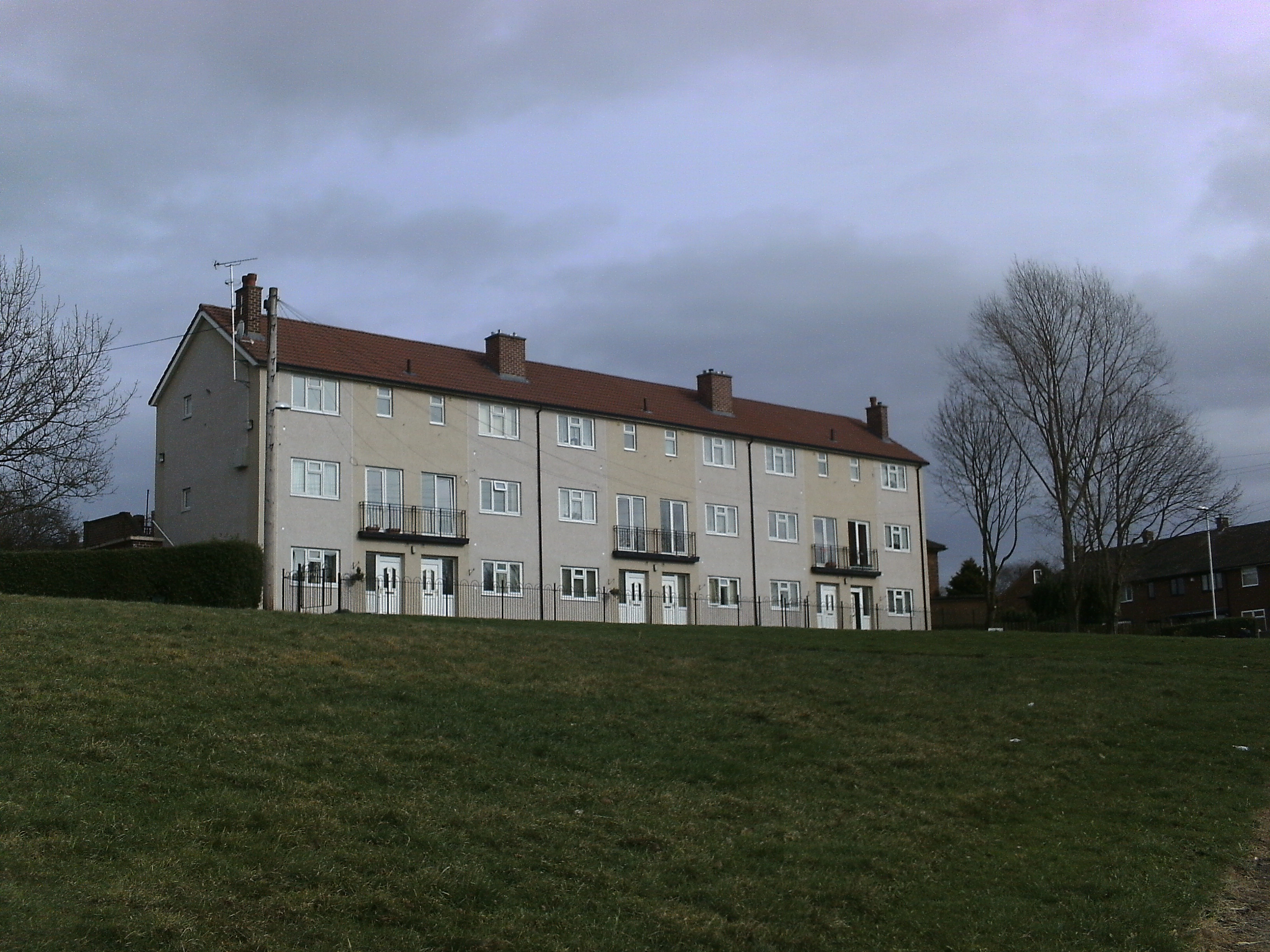
Low rise council flats on Fillingfir Drive

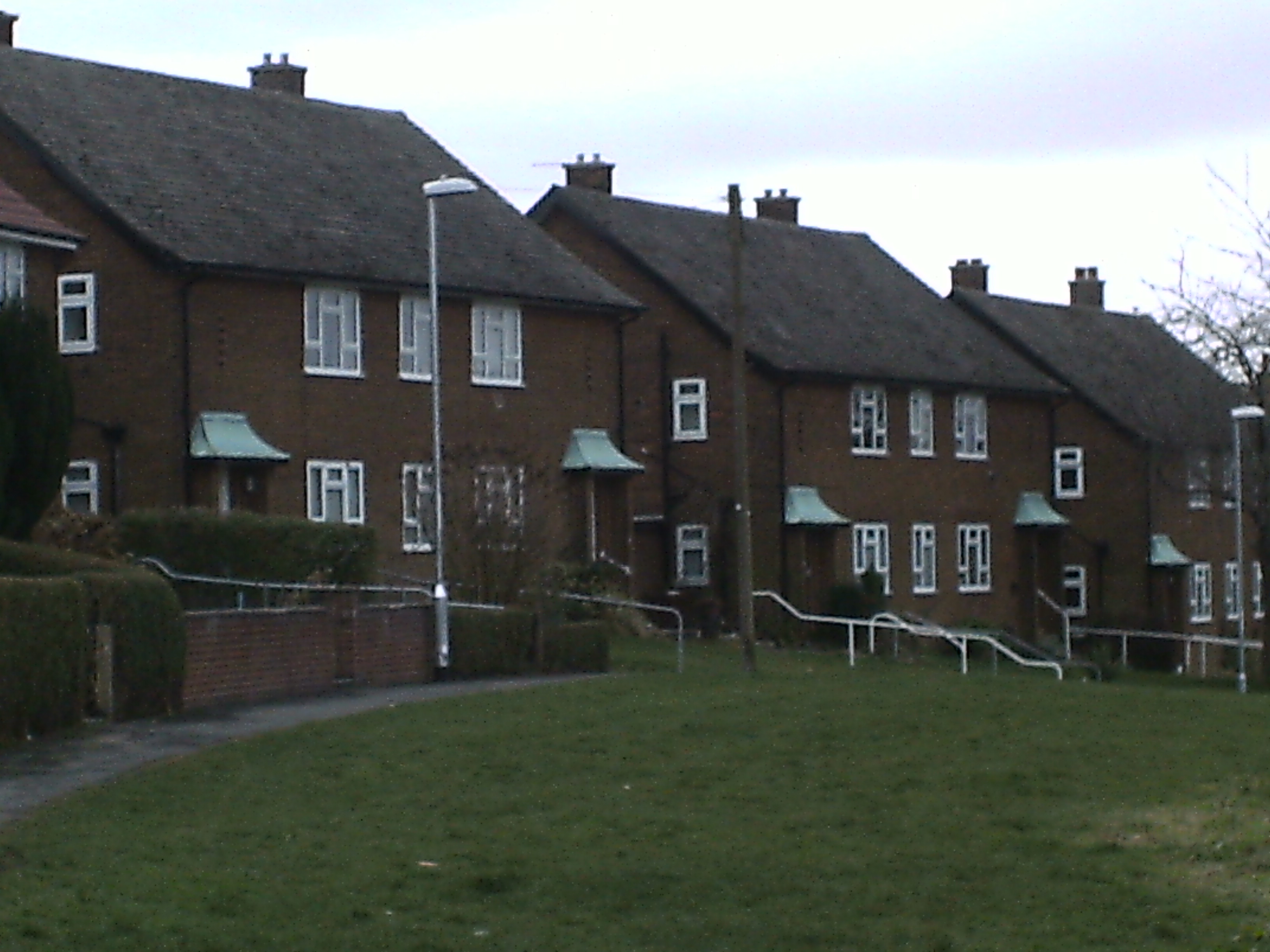
Flats on Latchmere View

There is a wide variety of council housing in Moor Grange built throughout the 1950s and 1960s. Most of the estate is made up of red brick semi-detached houses, there are also flats built in the style of houses, and a few rows of red brick terraced houses. There is the Linton Croft complex of sheltered housing situated at the top of Old Farm Parade. There are three blocks of high rise flats, these being Clayton Court, Clayton Grange (both of which were used for the filming of The Beiderbecke Affair) and Moor Grange Court situated on Butcher Hill. There are also several smaller blocks of flats (three and four stories) situated around the estate, as well as flats built in the style of houses. There are also flats situated above all of the parades of shops on the estate.

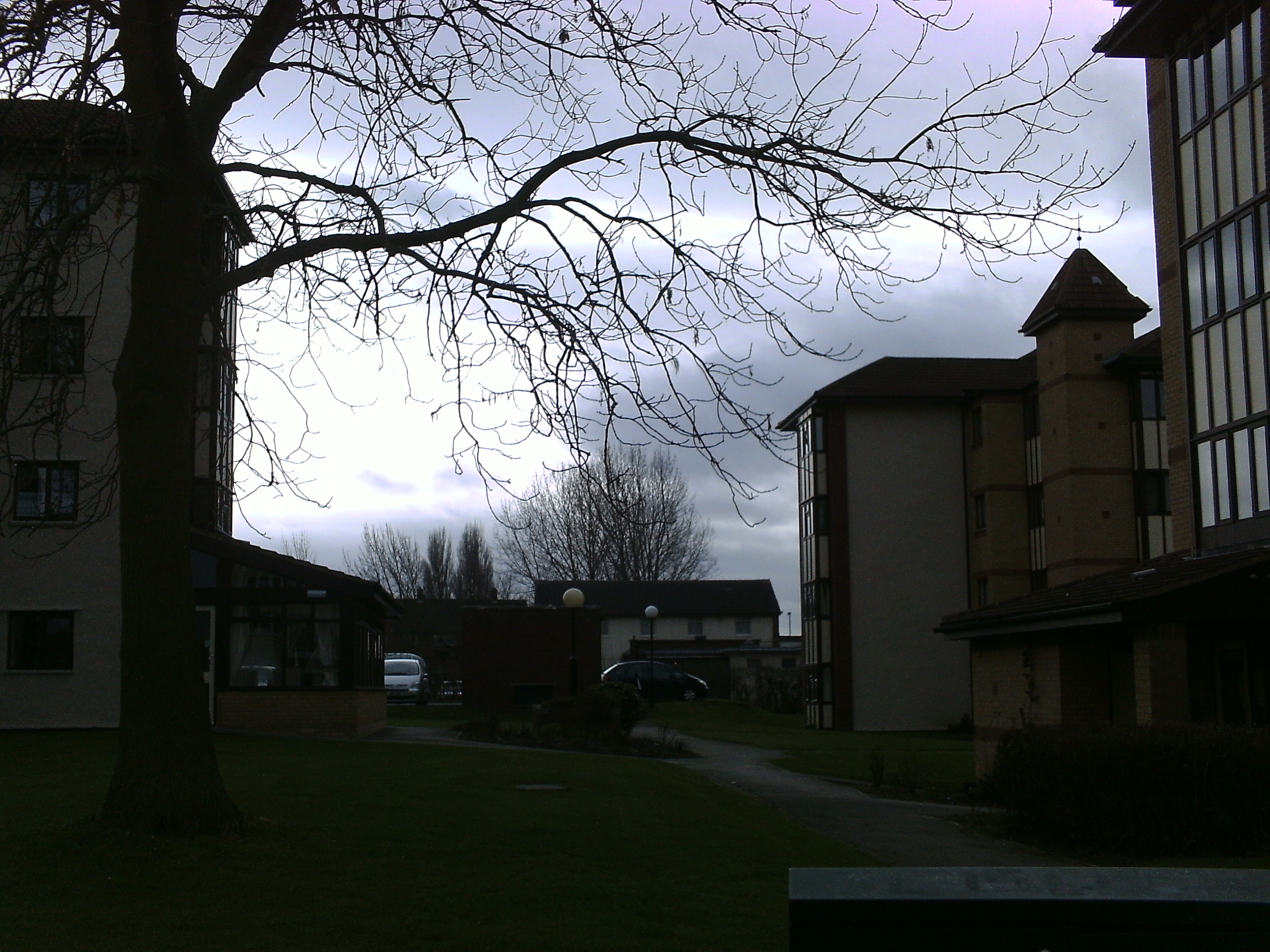
Linton Croft Sheltered accommodation

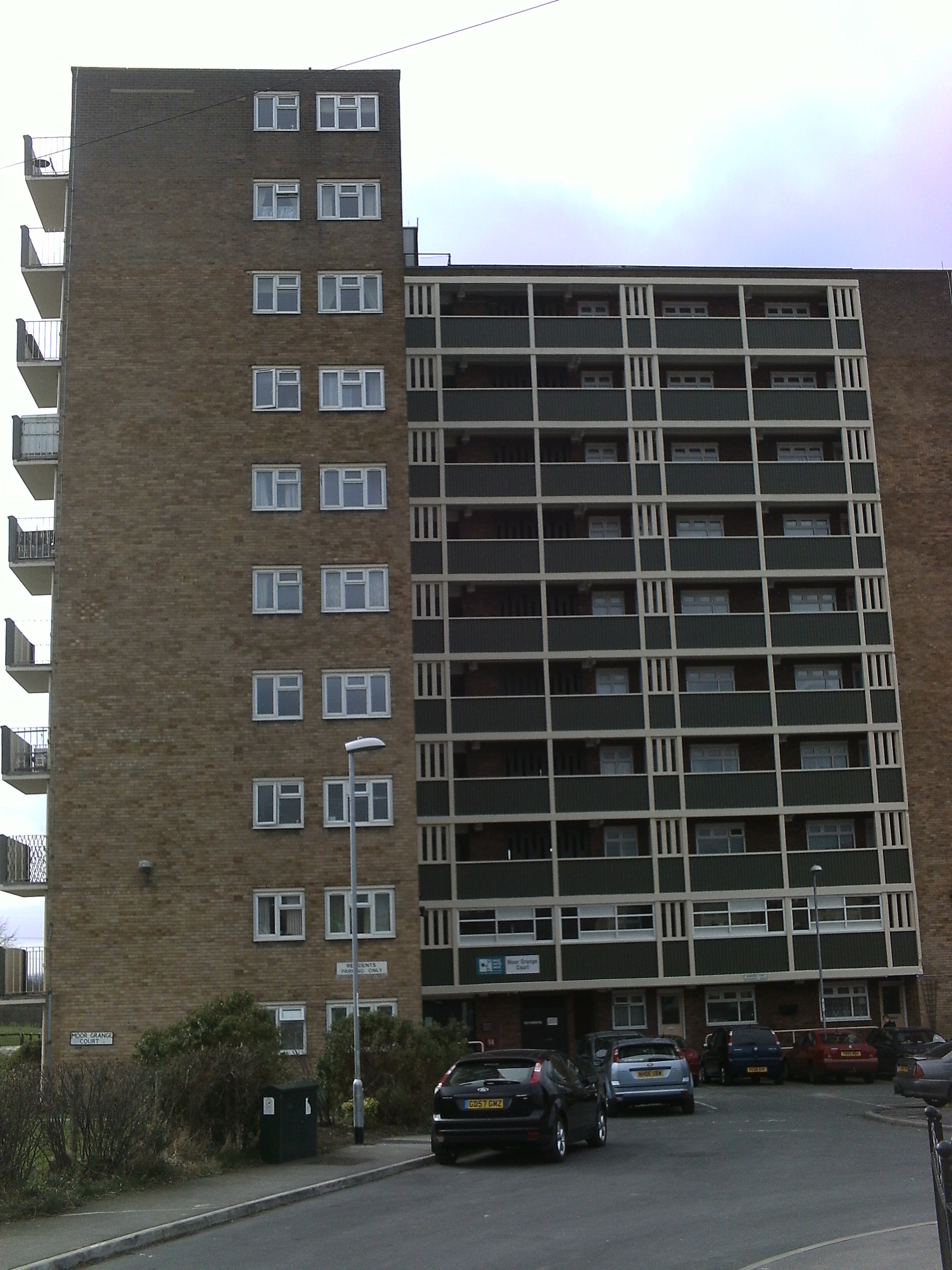
Moor Grange Court

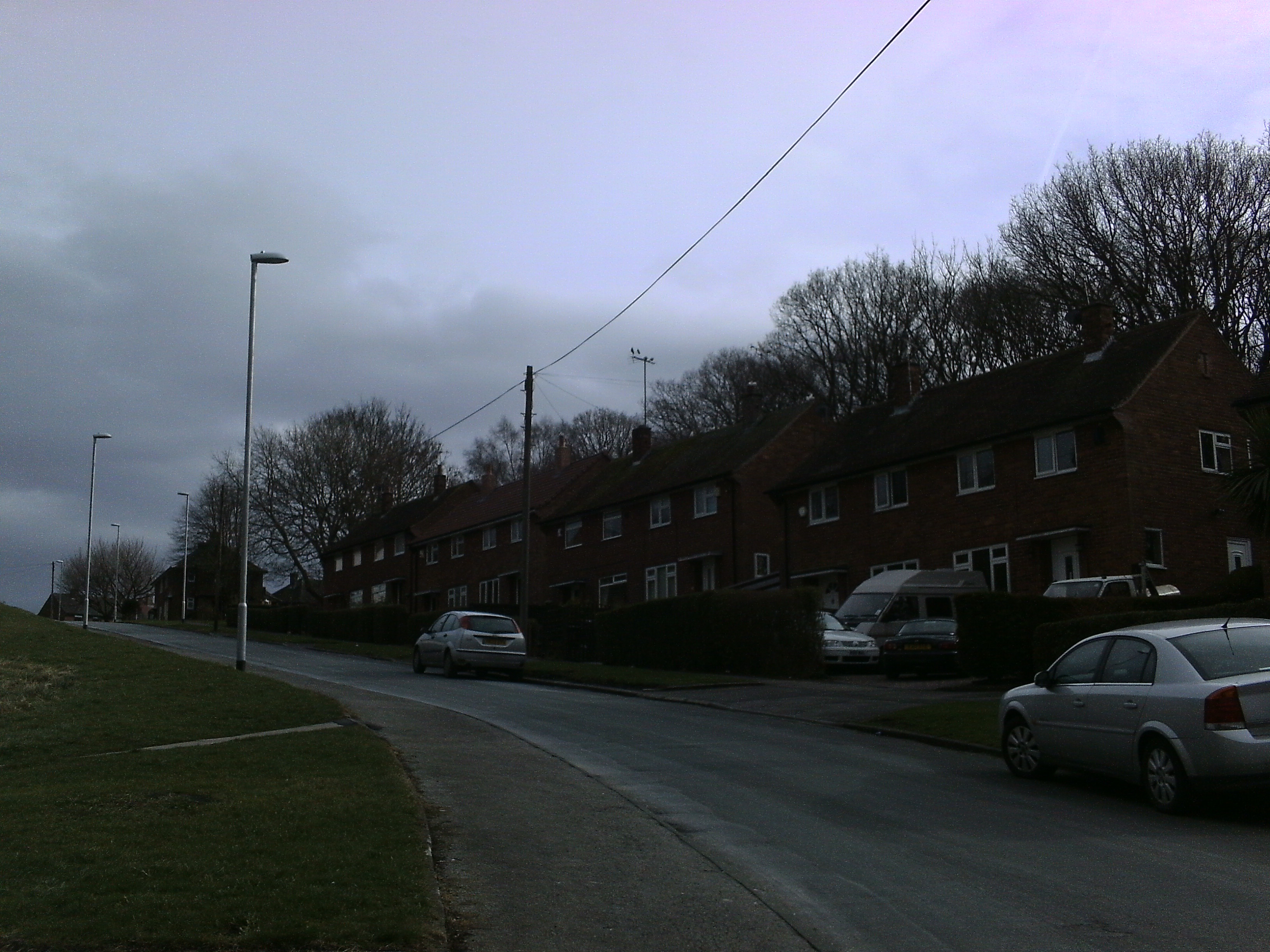
Semi-detached houses on Fillingfir Drive

== Overview ==
Most Street names are preceded by Old Farm, Latchmere, Moor Grange and Fillingfir. It also benefits from three large grassed areas for recreation. Close by for fishing are Clayton Ponds which are located in Clayton Wood. Some old and recent pictures of the estate can be seen on the Leodis website which has a large collection of photos from Leeds and surrounding areas. It is circled by the West Park section of the Leeds Outer Ring Road (A6120), Spen Lane and Butcher Hill. There are three high rise blocks of flats: one on Butcher Hill called Moor Grange Court; the other two are Clayton Grange and Clayton Court at the bottom of Fillingfir Drive. At the corner of Old Farm Parade are three sets of maisonettes which have recently been renovated on the outside.

== Proximity to the airport ==
Moor Grange is situated about four miles from Leeds Bradford Airport. Since 2000 the air traffic to the airport has increased from around 1.6 million passengers a year to over 3 million passengers a year. This has led to a large increase in air traffic over the estate, particularly in the summer months. The frequency of the extra traffic, has caused annoyance to some residents. At peak time, five or six passenger jets may pass over Moor Grange to land at the airport every hour. The level of traffic is expected to grow further.

== Odonyms ==
Old Farm Drive. Old Farm Close. Old Farm Garth. Old Farm Cross, Old Farm Walk. Old Farm Approach. Old Farm Parade. Latchmere Road, Latchmere Approach. Latchmere Green, Latchmere Cross. Latchmere View. Latchmere Drive. Latchmere Gardens. Latchmere Walk. Latchmere Crest. Latchmere Close. Fillingfir Drive. Fillingfir Road and Fillingfir Walk.

Moor Grange View, Moor Grange Rise, Moor Grange Drive and some of West Park Drive were built before the rest and probably around the same time as some of the houses on West Park. Technically they can be said to be part of the Moor Grange Estate.

== Location ==
Leeds City Square is about 4 miles to the south east. To the north is the Ireland Wood estate. To the South are Kirkstall, Hawksworth and Headingley. Horsforth is close by and has its own web site.

== Transport ==
=== History ===
Moor Grange had a number of bus routes either passing through or terminating/starting on the estate. LCT bus route number 74 went from Moor Grange to Belle Isle; route number 76 from Moor Grange to Middleton; route 73 went from Moor Grange to Greenthorpe. West Yorkshire Bus route number 655 from Leeds to Bradford and the similar route 755 both skirted the estate via Spen Lane and Butcher Hill. These routes have been either discontinued or re-routed due to the deregulation of the bus routes in the 1980s. Route 135 was a school bus route and operated the same route as the 74 but terminated at the Beckett Park estate; it ran through the week purely for pupils of Beckett Park Junior mixed and Infant School.

=== Current services ===
Bus services are now operated by First West Yorkshire, and Moor Grange is served by route 56. The route, which is part of the 'Overground Network', operates between Whinmoor, Headingley and Moor Grange, where it terminates on Latchmere Drive. Route 27, between Leeds and Guiseley, operates along Spen Lane and Butcher Hill. The Leeds to Harrogate railway line passes near to Moor Grange, although the nearest stations are at Headingley and Horsforth. Leeds Bradford Airport is approximately four miles to the north west.

== Pubs ==
Moor Grange has one pub called The Dalesman at the junction of Butcher Hill and Old Farm Approach. Its three rooms were once named The Strid, The Wharfedale and the Airedale. Close by is The Bridge at the bottom of Butcher Hill (geographically in Horsforth). The now defunct Hark To Rover at the bottom of Spen Lane, which was originally a row of shops, has recently been returned to retail use. Approximately 2 miles away down Queenswood Drive was The Duttons Arms, which was demolished in December, 2011.

== Trivia ==
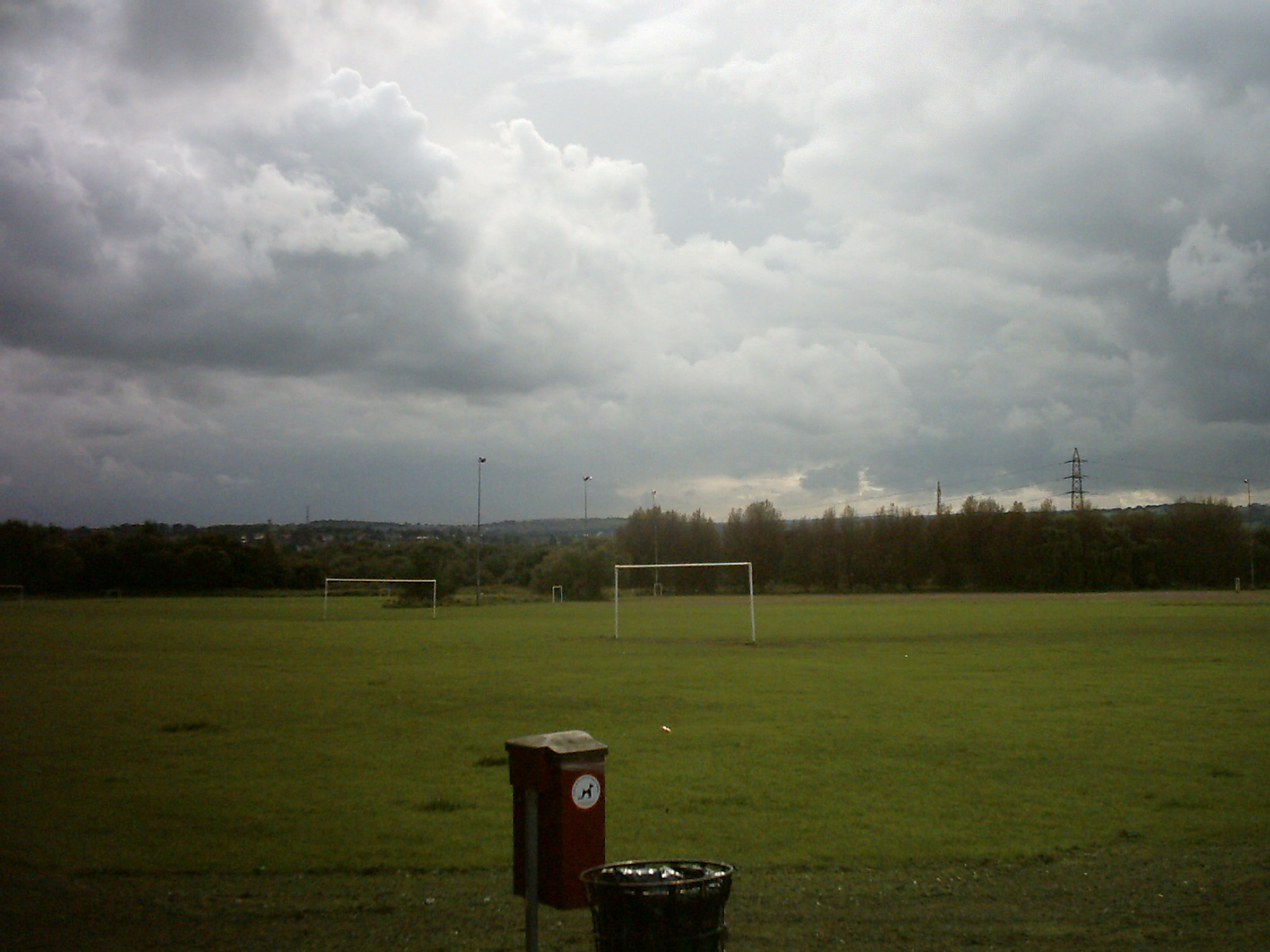
Butcher Hill Playing Fields. The football match and abduction scenes in The Beiderbecke Affair were filmed here.

Moor Grange was used as a backdrop for the TV series The Beiderbecke Affair which featured shots from Abbey Grange School, Butcher Hill playing fields and Clayton Grange Flats.

Moor Grange is also used as one of the locations for the TV series Fat Friends. 'Midgleys' Fish and Chip Shop on Butcher Hill featured as 'Big and Battered Fish and Chip Shop'. on the series.

Moor Grange is also the name of a row of houses in Yeadon situated on Victoria Road (A658).

A bonfire used to be held every year on 5 November (Bonfire Night) on the field that is bordered by Old Farm Drive, although this has now been stopped due to health and safety restrictions.

Although Moor Grange was built on the site of an Old Farm there are more street names beginning with Latchmere than they are Old Farm and only three beginning with Moor Grange. Three roads also commence with the name Fillingfir and the 3 blocks of high rise flats are named .. Moor Grange Court, Clayton Grange and Clayton Court. Clayton maybe associated with nearby Clayton Ponds in Clayton Woods just across the ring road.

Moor Grange is also the name of a fictional Horse Stable and Country Estate set in Devon, UK in the books about "Kit Hunter Show Jumper" by Peter Grey.

Moor Grange was also the name of a hall at the Leeds School of Medicine which in turn became the University of Leeds.

Moor Grange is also the name of a farm located on Scotland Lane, Horsforth, Leeds.

== Gallery ==
Images of Moor Grange

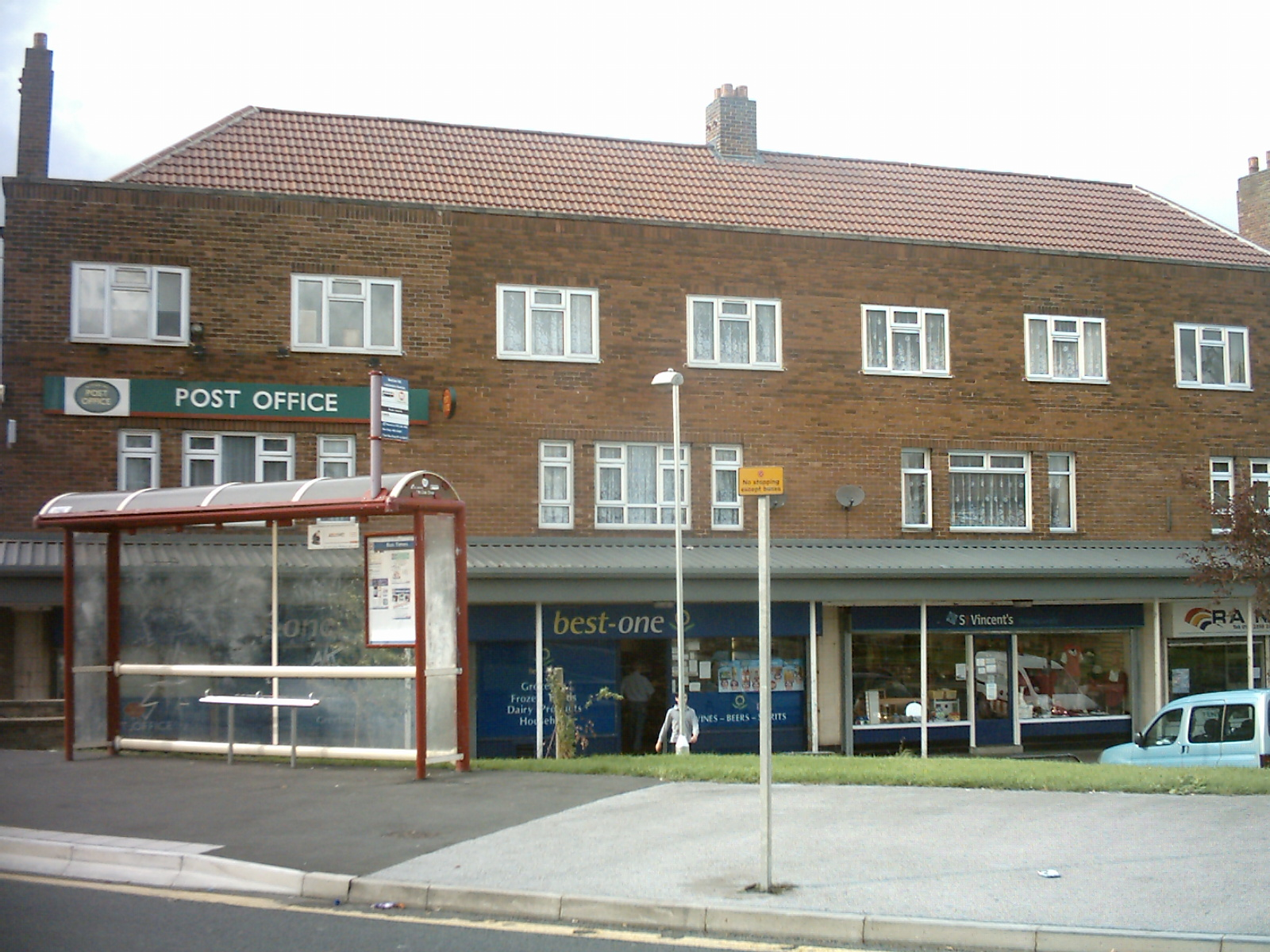
Shops on Butcher Hill

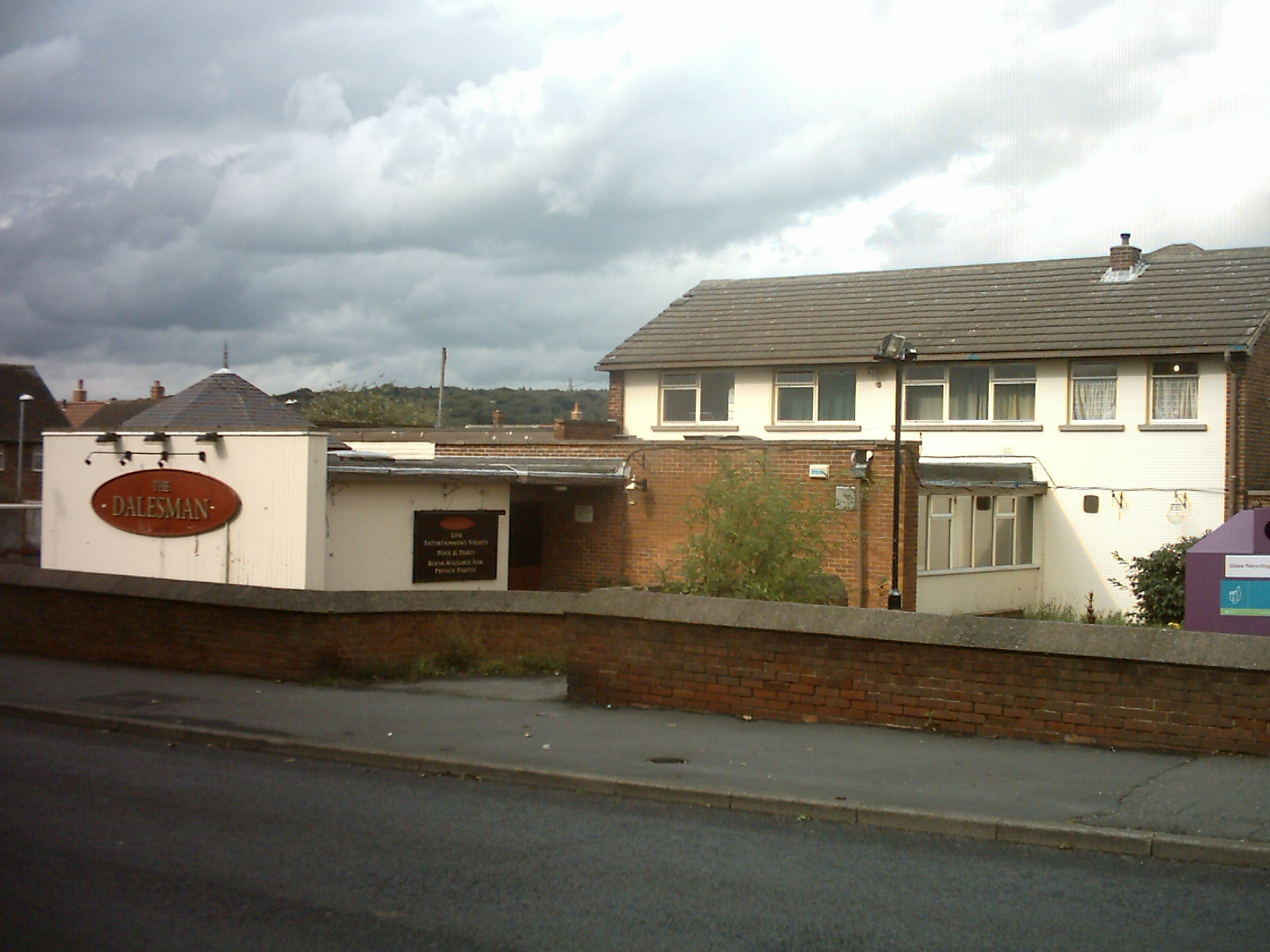
The Dalesman public house on Butcher Hill

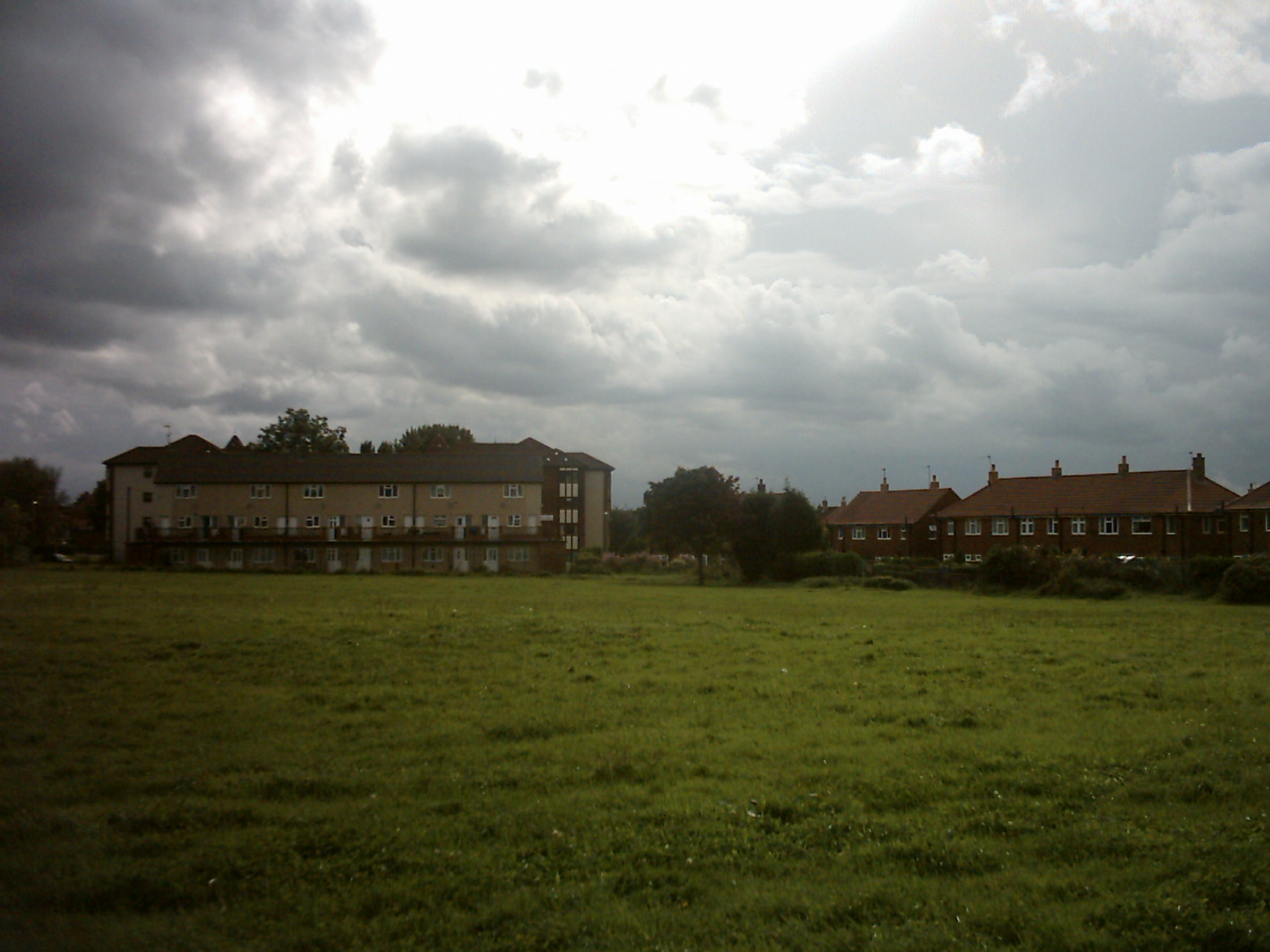
Public green on Old Farm Drive

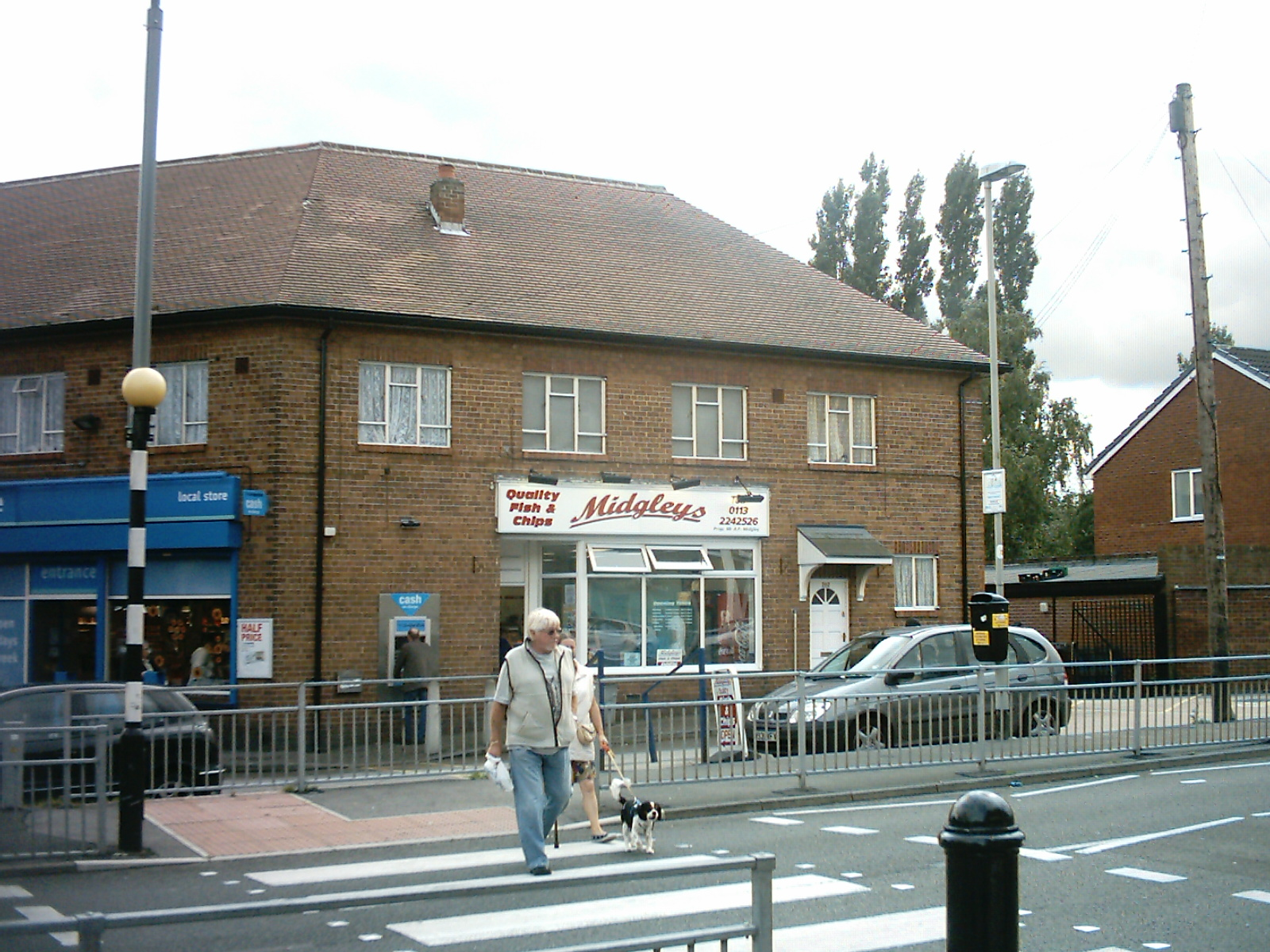
Shops on Butcher Hill/Spen Lane. Midgleys was used in Yorkshire Television drama Fat Friends

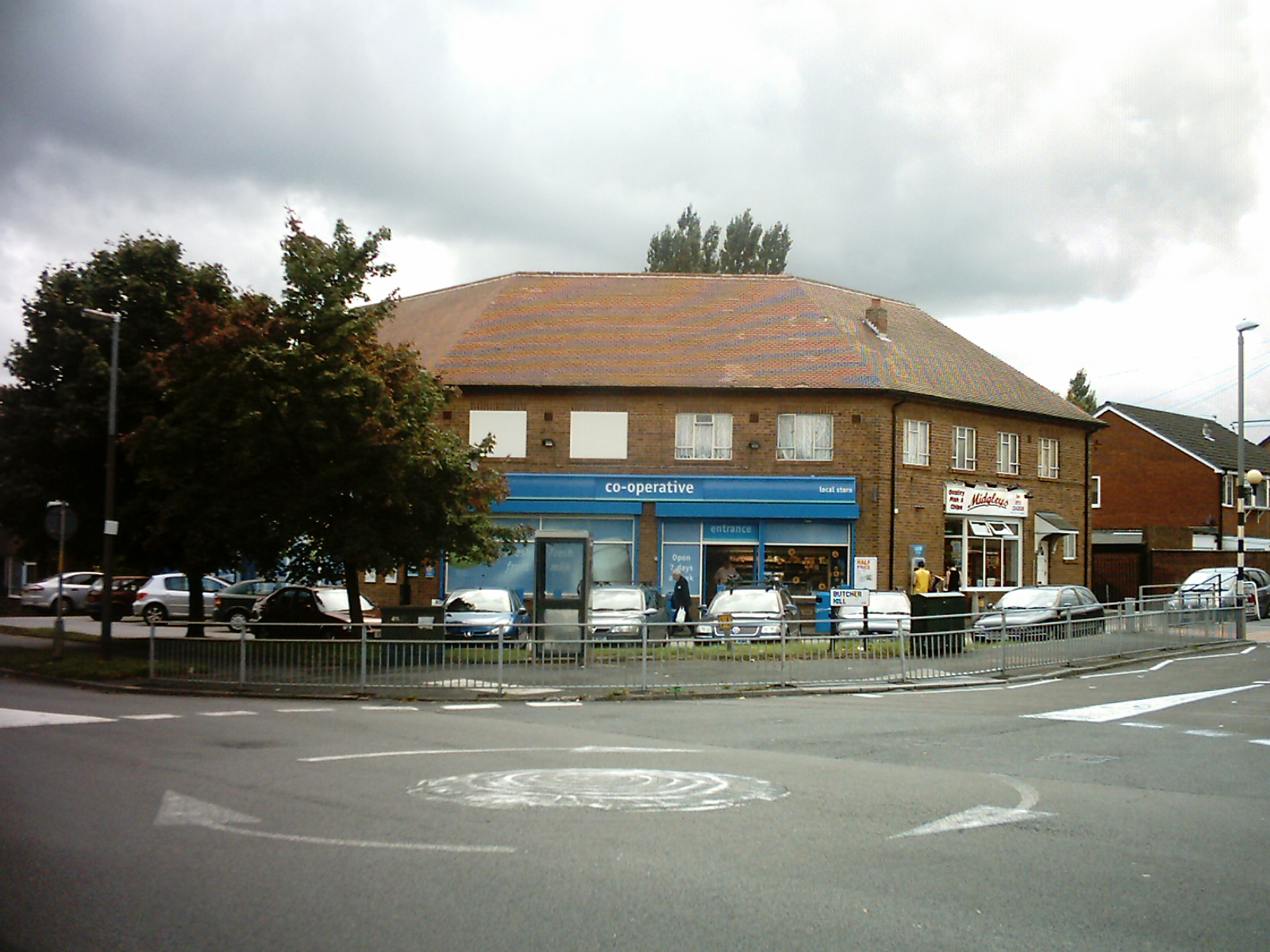
Co-op on Butcher Hill/Spen Lane.

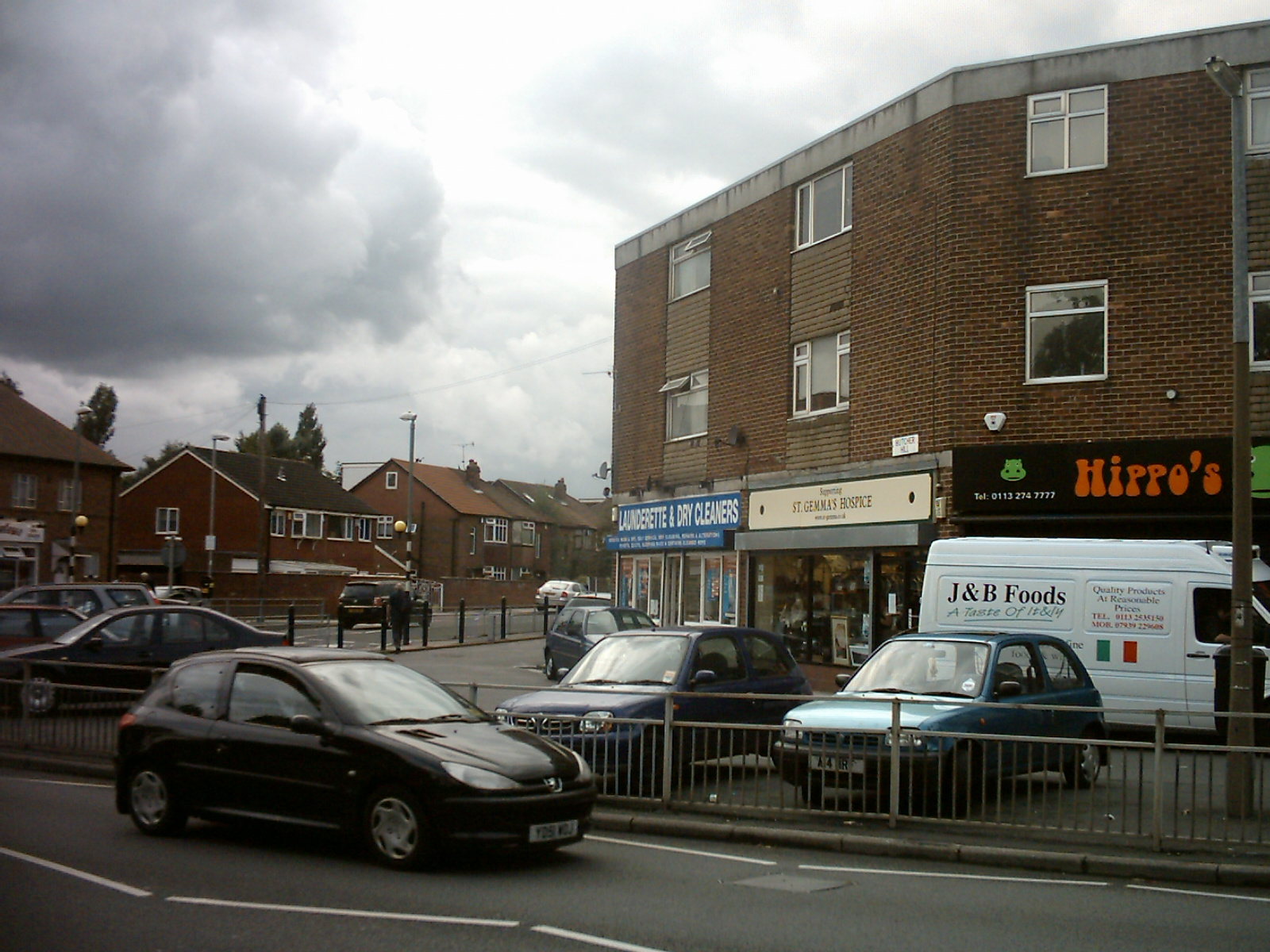
Shops on Butcher Hill/Spen Lane.

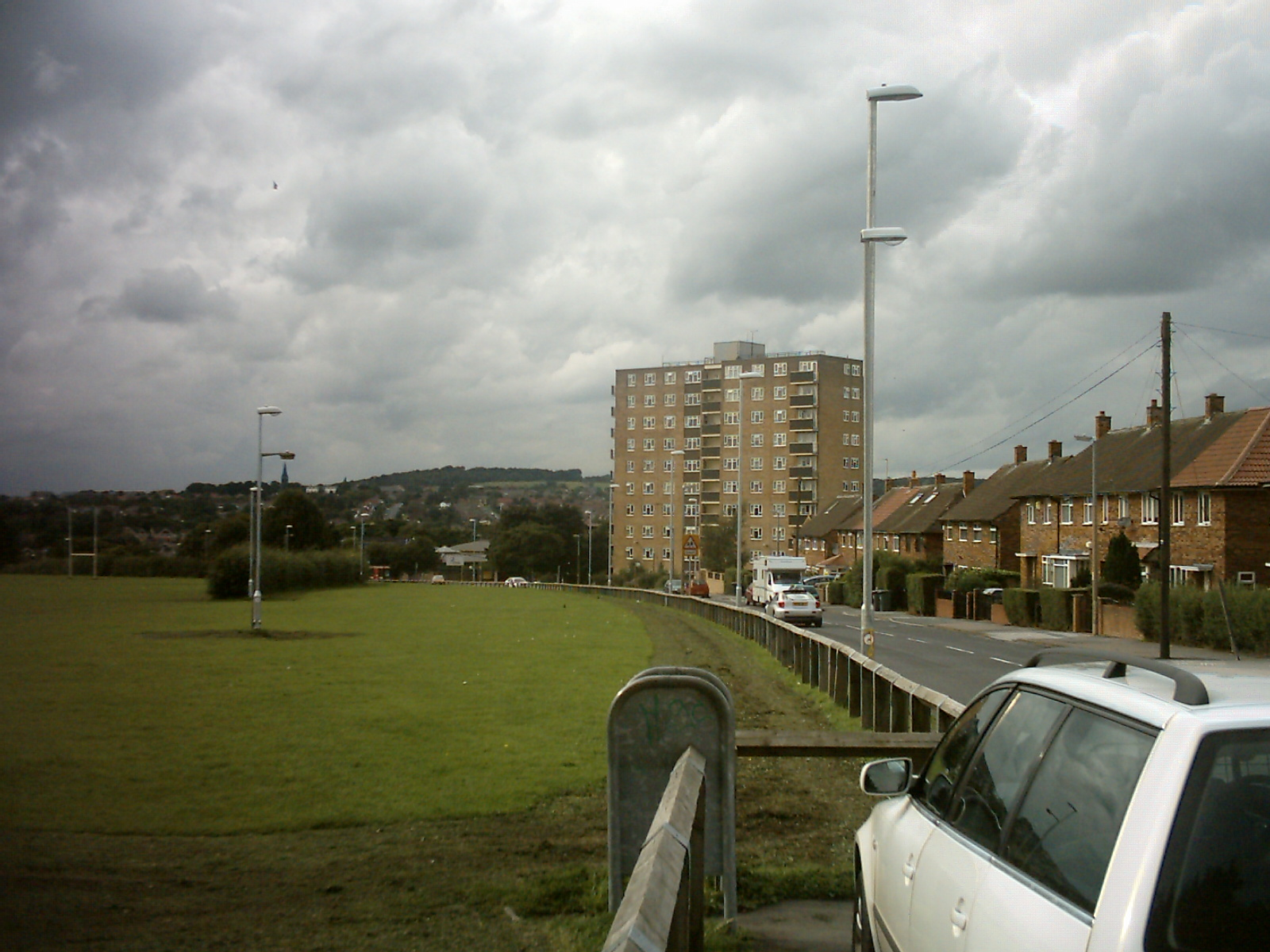
Butcher Hill

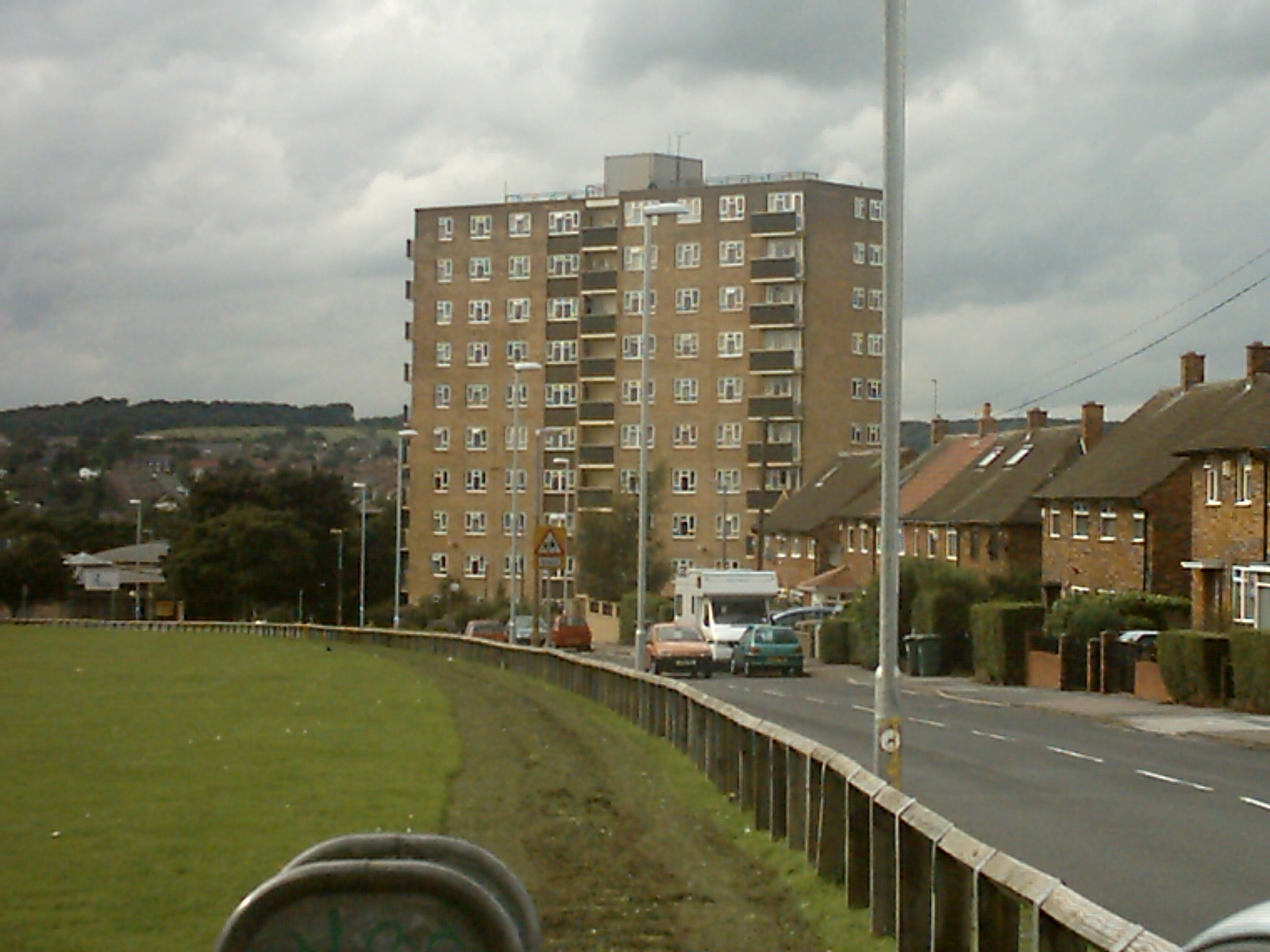
Moor Grange Court
