= The Beiderbecke Connection =

British ITV comedy drama, 3rd of trilogy

- Genre: Comedy drama
- Written by: Alan Plater
- Directed by: Alan Bell
- Starring: James Bolam; Barbara Flynn; Terence Rigby; Danny Schiller; Dudley Sutton; Dominic Jephcott; Keith Smith; Patrick Drury; Judy Brooke; Thomas McGlinchey; George Costigan; Sean Scanlan
- Theme music composer: Frankie Trumbauer and Chauncey Morehouse
- Opening theme: "Cryin' All Day"
- Country of origin: United Kingdom
- Original language: English
- No. of episodes: 4

Production
- Executive producer: Keith Richardson
- Producer: Michael Glynn
- Production company: Yorkshire Television

Original release
- Network: ITV
- Release: 27 November – 18 December 1988

Related
- The Beiderbecke Tapes

The Beiderbecke Connection is a four-part British television serial written by Alan Plater and broadcast in 1988. It is the third and final part of The Beiderbecke Trilogy and stars James Bolam and Barbara Flynn as schoolteachers Trevor Chaplin and Jill Swinburne. Now with a baby in tow, Jill and Trevor are asked by Big Al to look after a refugee called "Ivan".

== Plot ==
Trevor Chaplin teaches woodwork and likes to listen to jazz. Jill Swinburne teaches English and wants to help save the planet. They live together and just want a quiet life. Since their last adventure in The Beiderbecke Tapes, Jill and Trevor have a child - Firstborn. Big Al asks them to put up a friend of his and they agree. But when Ivan arrives, they find he speaks no English but thinks that "Bix is cool". Meetings with criminals, smuggling people over the border, fighting for the right to education even when it's against the rules. These and other adventures are played out to a soundtrack of jazz music in the style of Bix Beiderbecke performed by Frank Ricotti with Kenny Baker as featured cornet soloist.

== Episodes ==
As with The Beiderbecke Affair, the four episodes are titled by incipit, that is, the title is simply the first spoken words heard in each episode.

- "Oh Look, It's Average-Sized Trevor Chaplin" - Jill & Trevor have produced Firstborn. They need a babysitter and get a refugee. Head for the border.
- "Hello Sir, Hello Miss" - The refugee is back from the border. Life goes on. Big Al and Little Norm make other plans. Trevor makes a stand.
- "Is He the Lodger?" - A face from the past. Criminals in the spare bed. The police take an interest. A day at the seaside.
- "What Do We Have on Hockey Sticks?" - Rocking the world on its axis. But life goes on for those that hear the music.

== Production ==
=== Filming locations ===
- Jill's house- 15 Hillview Avenue, Chapel Allerton, Leeds
- San Quentin High- Foxwood School, Seacroft, Leeds
- The bowling green- The Recreation Ground, Wortley, Leeds
- The Archer Street shopping precinct- The area surrounding the Bond Street Precinct (now Leeds Shopping Plaza), Bond Street and Albion Street, Leeds city centre.
- Highfield Avenue, Wortley.
- Parish church of St Margarets, Horsforth, Leeds.
- Big Al phones Trevor and Jill from the former BT phone box opposite 72A Hall Lane, Leeds LS12 2BL. The area has been considerably redeveloped but the outline of the cross on the funeral director's opposite is still visible, confirming the location.
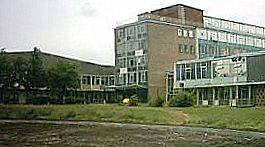
East Leeds Family Learning Centre (former Foxwood School) in Seacroft, Leeds was used as 'San Quentin High' (picture taken June 2008).

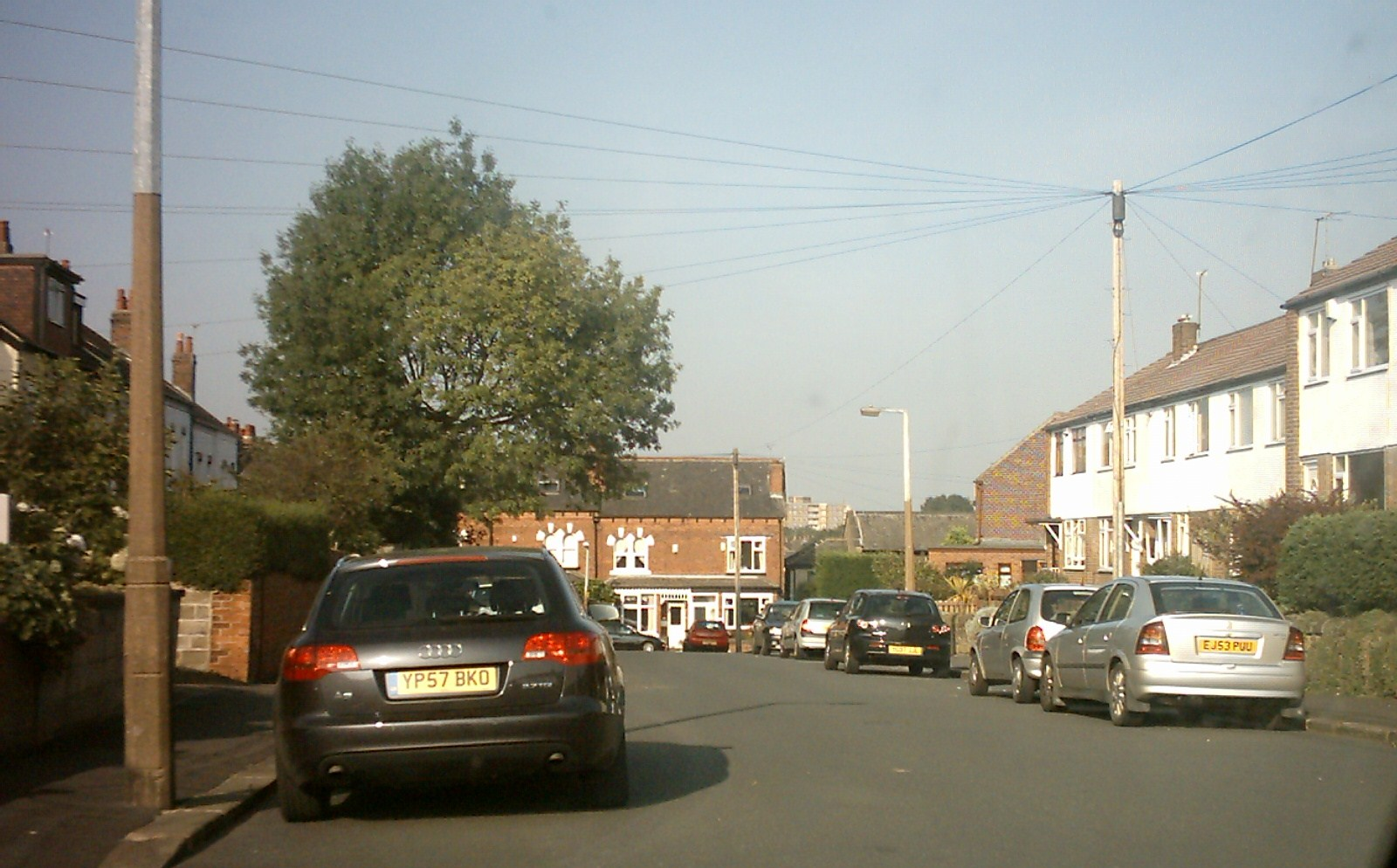
Norfolk Gardens in Chapel Allerton, Leeds was used in the Beiderbecke Tapes and The Beiderbecke Connection.
