= Foxwood School, Seacroft =

Foxwood School
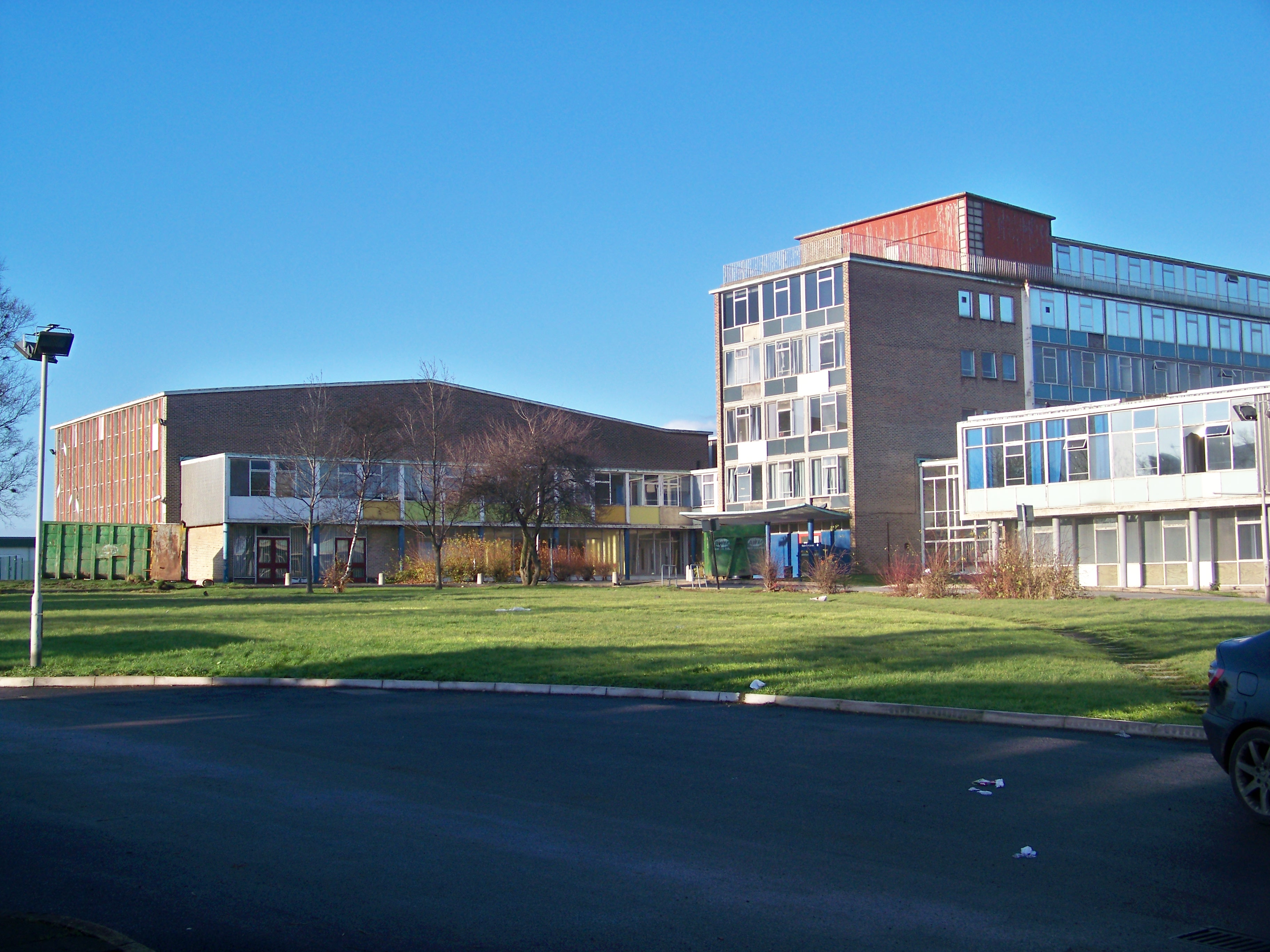

Location
- Brooklands View; Seacroft; Leeds, West Yorkshire, LS14; England; 53.818070°N 1.475200°W

Information
- Type: Comprehensive
- Motto: Many Minds One Heart
- Established: 1956
- Closed: 1992 (name changed to East Leeds High School)
- Local authority: City of Leeds
- Gender: Coeducational (male-only until 1971)
- Age: 11 to 19
- Enrolment: 1500
- Demolished: 2009

Foxwood School was a Comprehensive school in Seacroft, Leeds, West Yorkshire, England. It opened in 1956 and closed 40 years later in 1996.

== History ==
=== Summary ===
Foxwood School was the first comprehensive school in Leeds and opened on 4 September 1956 under the Headship of Mr M R Rowlands. It was built as part of the development of the Seacroft Housing Estate which, with a population of about 18,000, is one of the largest council estates in the country. The history of Foxwood is inextricably linked to that of the estate which it served. The school originally occupied the buildings which later became Parklands Girls High School for 2 years, before moving, in 1958, into the partly completed building on a 32-acre site at the east end of South Parkway, on Brooklands View. The plan was to take 300 boys a year until its capacity of 1500 pupils was reached. The school was officially opened on 5 February 1959 by Hugh Gaitskell, MP for Leeds South.

Foxwood continued to grow and by 1962 a sixth form had been established and in 1963 the target of 1500 pupils had been reached. The comprehensive system always had its critics but during the 1960s the school demonstrated considerable academic, sporting and artistic success. Pupils gained places at Oxford and Cambridge and other leading Universities, the school produced international football and rugby league players and many of the boys played in local bands. In addition to the usual academic subjects "technical, engineering and commercial courses and advanced courses in music and art" were also provided.

Foxwood changed from an all boys’ school to a mixed one in 1971, during the Headship of Bob Spooner but " unfortunately the intake of boys was always going to be in excess of girls due to the close proximity of Parklands Girls School which was situated within Foxwood’s catchment area". In 1973 Leeds undertook a massive reorganisation of the education system by establishing a first, middle and high school pattern of education which came into force the following year. Foxwood became a high school.

The school had difficult challenges in the 1970s in addition to restructuring. Many of the children came from deprived backgrounds and Foxwood was described in a brief biography of one of its teachers, the future MP, Colin Burgon, as “a deprived secondary school in the Seacroft area of East Leeds.” Bob Spooner was a leading light in the world of education and was known for appointing radical teachers who used innovative teaching methods. He recognised the need to experiment and engage with the children. According to Colin Richardson, another teacher at the time, these methods "worked because we got really good results with the pupils."

During the 1980s falling pupil numbers across the city meant that all Leeds high schools developed surplus places, so in 1986 another plan of major restructuring was launched, middle schools were due to be eliminated with the organisation reverting to the old style pattern of primary and secondary system of education. Under this plan Foxwood was to become a tertiary college for higher education. In 1989 the overall development plan was rejected by the LEA. The school was to remain open but a decision was taken to rename it and give it a fresh image. On 31 August 1992 Foxwood School officially closed and was renamed East Leeds High School.

=== Head teachers ===
Two heads dominated the foundation and development of Foxwood and ran the school for more than thirty years.

- Matthew Rowlands (1956 -1967). He was appointed head teacher when the school opened. He had previously been deputy head of Caludon Castle School in Coventry and helped establish the ethos and organisation of the school in its early years.
- Bob Spooner (1967–1988). He helped develop the school through the 1970s, and 1980s, and introduced many of the innovations detailed below. After his retirement he wrote several books about his teaching experiences including Lay Stone on Stone: Story of a Comprehensive School which is a history of Foxwood School.

=== Innovation at Foxwood ===
Foxwood was an innovative school throughout its history. These innovations included: –

- 1956 First comprehensive school in Leeds.
- 1965 First school in Leeds to set up its own outdoor centre.
- 1969 First comprehensive school to abolish corporal punishment.
- 1968 Staged the first amateur production of Oliver!
- 1973 One of the first comprehensive schools to abandon school uniform and invite pupils "to dress suitably according to their personal taste."
- 1978 Mounted its own adventure expedition to remote parts of the Atlas Mountains.
- 1978 One of the first schools to establish BEC (British Educational Council) (later BTEC) courses.
- 1981 Set up the Foxwood Steel Band.

=== Sport at Foxwood ===
The school was built with comprehensive facilities for sport – extensive playing fields, cross country and cycling courses, many tennis courts and 3 gyms. Foxwood had "an enviable sporting reputation at local, county and international level" producing full internationals in football, rugby union and rugby league. Geoff Wraith was the first of many sport's professionals from the school when he signed for Hunslet in 1961 while still at school. In addition to producing outstanding individuals, the school produced successful teams. The major schools football competition in Leeds was the U15 School Cup and, during the school's lifetime, Foxwood won the cup more often than any other school. In the early 1970s the school won the football league and cup competitions in every age-group.

As well as the traditional school team sports, Foxwood introduced pupils to a wide variety of other sports. These included Basketball, Badminton, Boxing, Cyclo-cross, Rock Climbing and Table Tennis. The Basketball teams had considerable success with, on one occasion, supplying all the players for the Leeds Schools’ Team and in 1970 providing the winning U13 Cup team from a single class. The school formed a cycling club in 1962 and took up Cyclo-cross in 1965. By the following year Foxwood riders were winning area and national titles and competing internationally. This success continued for many years.

=== Foxwood Farm ===
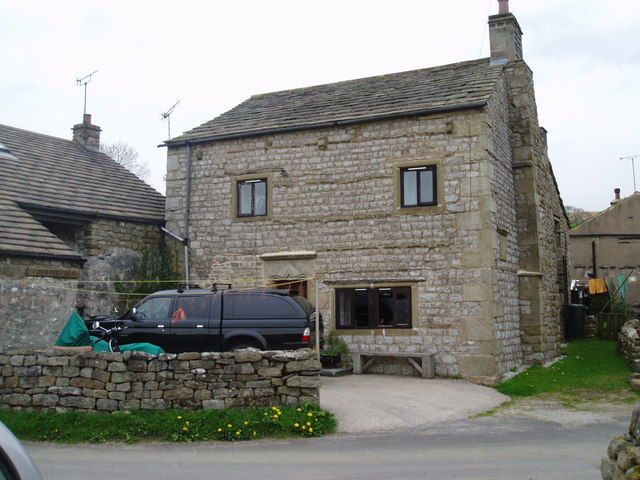
Foxwood Farm

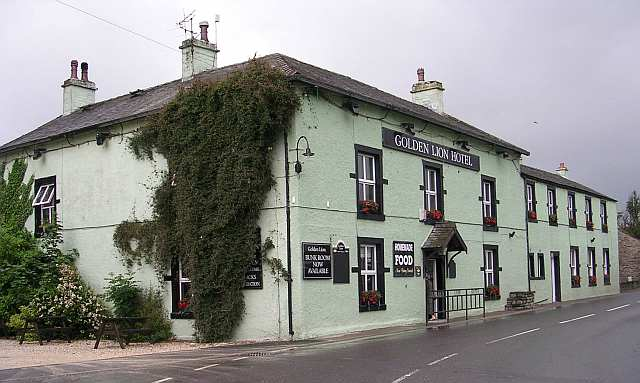
Golden Lion Hotel, Horton in Ribblesdale

In 1965 the school established a residential centre for outdoor education with the purchase, by the PTA, of a farm house in Horton in Ribblesdale in the Yorkshire Dales. The farm was renamed Foxwood Farm and was used for groups of pupils and staff to take up short residences there.

In 1970 the Golden Lion Inn, only a mile from the farm, was purchased to provide accommodation for mixed groups. The centres operated successfully and by 1980 over 10,000 pupils had attended residential courses there. The Golden Lion was sold in 1988 and when the school closed in 1996 the "farm was donated to an independent charity, the Friends of Foxwood Farm."

=== Foxwood Steel Band ===
Foxwood Steel Band was established in 1981 when Bob Spooner bought a set of steelpans for the school with funds provided by a UK government initiative designed to promote Multiculturalism and combat racism. Under the direction of Victoria Jaquiss the band was giving concerts by 1982. "Bob Spooner chose pans for an almost all-white school in order to provide a positive example of black culture, but it was the sound, the looks and the great potential for educational and musical inclusion which hit all the right notes!" The band was very successful and by 1987 "Foxwood started using pans as its main instrument for GCSE Music practicals." When the school closed in 1996 the band was renamed The Foxwood Steel Bandits and, as of 2016, continues to give many concerts every year.

=== The Beiderbecke Trilogy ===
The School was used as the location for ‘’San Quentin High’’ in the three TV series which comprise The Beiderbecke Trilogy: The Beiderbecke Affair, The Beiderbecke Tapes and The Beiderbecke Connection. All three were written by Alan Plater and starred James Bolam and Barbara Flynn and produced for Yorkshire Television. They were screened in 1985, 1987 and 1988. Some indoor scenes were filmed at Moor Grange County Secondary School.

=== Further history and closure ===
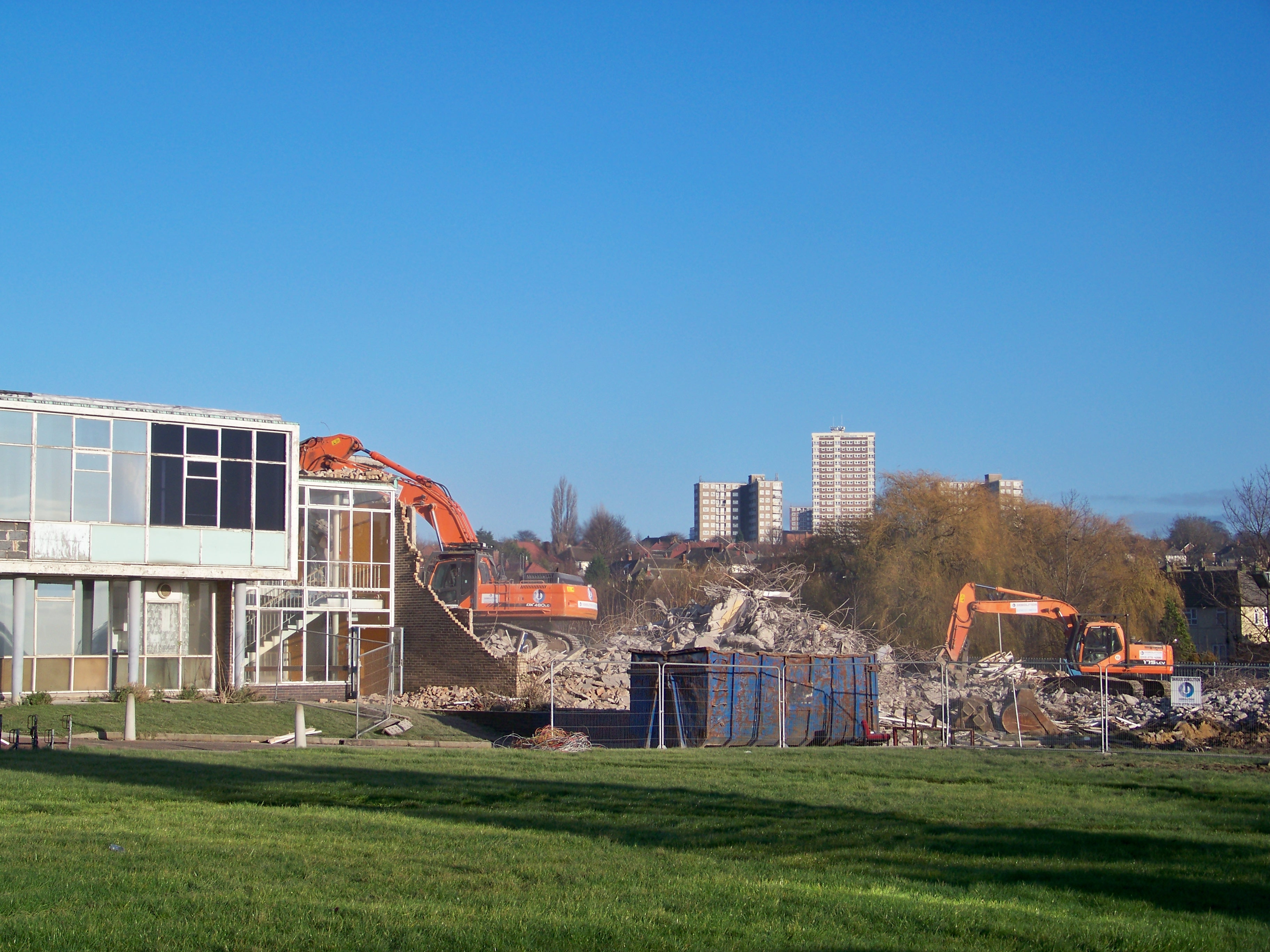
The demolition of the East Leeds Family Learning Centre (formerly Foxwood School)

After a reasonable Ofsted report in 1994 but still with falling pupil numbers across the city the LEA decided to close two schools in east Leeds (at this time the school had less than 450 pupils). East Leeds High and Cross Green High were to merge to become Copperfield College on the site of the old Cross Green School. East Leeds High school closed its doors to pupils in summer 1996 and in the same year the Building opened as The East Leeds Family Learning Centre.

On 3 March 1998 the Leeds Second Chance School was opened in the old Foxwood buildings to accommodate 300 young persons between 16–25 years old. The announcement at the time stated “The second chance schools are designed to combat the inability of traditional education to meet the needs of certain disadvantaged groups in society”. The school closed in 2005.

In 2009 the local council decided that the buildings were unfit for purpose and uneconomic to repair and in December 2009 the school was demolished.

== Notable former staff members ==
- Colin Burgon taught history at the school and later became Labour MP for Elmet Constituency between 1997 and 2010.
- John Davies taught physical education at the school. He played rugby union for Neath and Wales and rugby league for Leeds and Dewsbury.
- Lewis Jones taught mathematics at the school. He played rugby union for Neath, Wales and the British Lions and rugby league for Leeds and Great Britain. In 2009 he was chosen as one of the best rugby league footballers to have played in West Yorkshire and in 2013 was elected into the Rugby League Hall of Fame.

== Notable former pupils ==
=== Music and the arts ===
- Charlie Chuck (the stage name of David Kear) is a comedian and musician.
- Andrew Edge is a musician who has been in several bands, including Thompson Twins, Uropa Lula and Savage Progress.
- Barry Ryan was a singer and photographer.
- Paul Ryan was a singer, songwriter and record producer.
- Jon Rennard was a folksinger.

=== Sport ===
- Richard Cardus played rugby union for, and captained, his local side Roundhay RUFC, and also for Wasps RFC, Cardiff RFC and Barbarian FC.. He earned two international caps for England in 1979. He represented England during the Five Nations Championship that year, featuring in matches against France and Wales.
- Terry Connor played football for several clubs, including Leeds United. He was also a coach and manager.
- Martin Dickinson played football for Leeds United.
- Steve Downes played football for several clubs, including York City.
- Clive Freeman played football for Swansea City.
- Roy Greenwood played football for several clubs, including Hull City and Sunderland.
- Ellery Hanley, played rugby league for several teams, including Bradford Northern, Wigan and Leeds. He also captained Great Britain and went on to be a successful club and international coach.
- David Harvey was a goalkeeper for Leeds United and played for them nearly 350 times over a period of twenty years. He also played for Scotland and took part in the 1974 World Cup.
- Steve Pitchford played rugby league for Leeds and Great Britain. He won the Lance Todd Trophy in the 1977 Challenge Cup Final win over Widnes.
- Geoff Wraith played rugby league for Wakefield Trinity and Castleford.
