= The Beiderbecke Affair =

British ITV comedy drama, 1st of trilogy

- Genre: Comedy drama
- Written by: Alan Plater
- Directed by: David Reynolds; Frank W. Smith
- Starring: James Bolam; Barbara Flynn; Terence Rigby; Danny Schiller; Dudley Sutton; Dominic Jephcott; Sue Jenkins; Keith Smith; Keith Marsh
- Theme music composer: Frankie Trumbauer; Chauncey Morehouse
- Opening theme: "Cryin' All Day"
- Country of origin: United Kingdom
- Original language: English
- No. of episodes: 6

Production
- Executive producer: David Cunliffe
- Producer: Anne W. Gibbons
- Production company: Yorkshire Television

Original release
- Network: ITV
- Release: 6 January – 10 February 1985

Related
- The Beiderbecke Tapes; Get Lost!

The Beiderbecke Affair is a television series produced in the United Kingdom by ITV in 1985, written by the prolific Alan Plater, whose lengthy credits in British television since the 1960s included the four-part mini series Get Lost! for ITV in 1981. The Beiderbecke Affair has a similar style to Get Lost!, wherein Neville Keaton (Alun Armstrong) and Judy Threadgold (Bridget Turner) played in an ensemble cast. Although The Beiderbecke Affair was intended as a sequel to Get Lost!, Alun Armstrong proved to be unavailable and the premise was reworked. It is the first part of The Beiderbecke Trilogy, with the two sequel series being The Beiderbecke Tapes (1987) and The Beiderbecke Connection (1988).

== Plot ==
Rather than following a usual linear story structure, The Beiderbecke Affair – set in Leeds in 1985 – is a character-led drama with a plot that initially appears rather unclear, moving as it does from one seemingly unrelated event to another. These events – and the characters involved with them – are eventually shown to be interconnected.

Geordie Trevor Chaplin (James Bolam) teaches woodwork, enjoys football and is passionate about jazz. Jill Swinburne (Barbara Flynn) is interested in neither football nor jazz but teaches English and wants to help save the planet, standing in a local election as "your Conservation candidate". After Jill left her husband, her colleague Trevor began giving her lifts to school and from there a relationship blossomed. They have an easy-going relationship where half the words seem to be left unspoken but the viewer is never in any doubt as to the subtext.

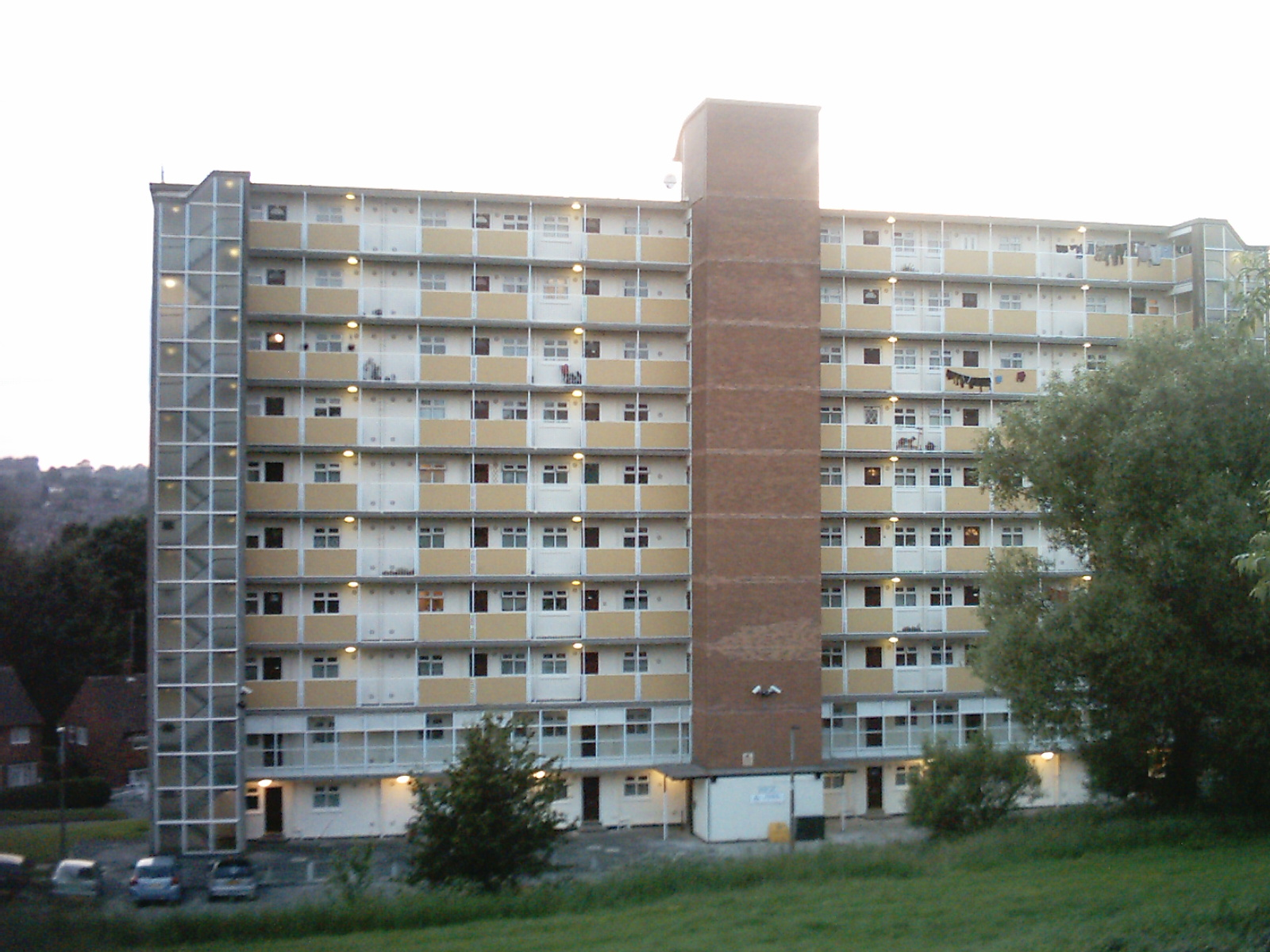
Clayton Grange Flats, Moor Grange, Leeds used as 'The Multistorey Block of Flats' in The Beiderbecke Affair, taken in June 2008, 24 years after filming

Trevor tries to buy some jazz records from a "dazzlingly beautiful platinum blonde" who calls at the door raising funds for the local Cubs’ football team. When the wrong records are delivered, a hunt begins that draws the pair into unforeseen intrigue. Thrown into the mix are Sgt Hobson (Dominic Jephcott), a suspicious yet seemingly incompetent graduate police detective, and a pair of local black economy tradesmen, "Big Al" (Terence Rigby) and "Little Norm" (Danny Schiller), who agree to help "average-sized" Jill and Trevor with their school supplies problems. There are elements of political and social commentary, whilst bureaucracy (within the police and local government) and the educational system are frequent targets of ridicule.

Setting the scene for the sequels, the series ends with Jill and Trevor 'running away to the hills' (Beamsley Beacon, Beamsley). Unlike subsequent episodes the series ends with this scene and Big Al and Little Norm listening to the radio at their allotment; the viewer hears from this that a local senior police officer has been suspended, and a businessman and a councillor have been arrested. It is later revealed in the Beiderbecke Tapes that Mr McAllister and Councillor McAllister were imprisoned.

It all unravels to a soundtrack of jazz music in the style of Bix Beiderbecke, performed by Frank Ricotti with Kenny Baker as featured cornet soloist. Extensive use is made of leitmotifs for the various characters. The theme song of the series uses the actual Bix Beiderbecke instrumental "Crying All Day" by Frankie Trumbauer and His Orchestra released in 1927 on Okeh Records and re-released in 1941 as part of the "Hot Jazz Classic" series on Columbia Records.

== Characters ==
The cast was as follows:

- Trevor Chaplin – James Bolam. Chaplin is a laid-back, slightly eccentric woodwork teacher at a comprehensive school. He is based on Mr Keaton from Get Lost!. Chaplin is in a relationship with Jill Swinburne.
- Jill Swinburne – Barbara Flynn is a committed environmentalist and social campaigner. An English teacher, she is educated and cultured. The name Swinburne was "inherited" from her ex-husband. The character was inspired by that of Mrs Threadgold from Get Lost!, but differs significantly in that Jill has a good sense of humour .
- Big Al – Terence Rigby. Big Al is a somewhat eccentric wheeler-dealer, recently unemployed from the building industry. He is the dominant half of the enterprise.
- Little Norm – Danny Schiller Little Norm is the submissive partner in the business with his "brother" Big Al. The plot makes it clear that Al, Norm and Janey are not in fact related, although they use sibling-based pronouns for each other on many occasions.
- Janey – Sue Jenkins Known by Trevor as 'that dazzlingly beautiful platinum blonde', Janey sells him records in aid of the Cubs football team, the consequences of which drive the plot of the "affair".
- Sgt Hobson – Dominic Jephcott is a young, enthusiastic, graduate police officer. Well-spoken and knowledgeable about police procedure, he is however singularly incompetent – spending most of his duty hours investigating hypothetical crimes, and using his notes for his next thesis.
- Chief Superintendent Forrest – Colin Blakely Forrest is a plain-speaking and effective police superintendent. Jaded by the job, he has become thoroughly corrupt. Based on a character from Get Lost!, who was likewise disparaging towards his counterpart, however unlike Forrest he was neurotic and somewhat detached from reality.
- Mr Carter – Dudley Sutton Mr Carter is a jaded and cynical history teacher, and an ally of Jill and Trevor.
- Mr Wheeler – Keith Smith the school head teacher. A petty, neurotic jobsworth he is loathed by pupils and staff alike, but remains largely oblivious to the contempt in which he is held.
- Harry – Keith Marsh. A retired bookie's runner and would-be supergrass. A seemingly harmless pensioner, often out walking with his dog, Jason. He is regularly referred to by the ambiguous description "The man with the dog called Jason".
- Helen McAllister (Helen of Tadcaster) – Alison Skilbeck Helen is the somewhat needy ex-fiancée of Trevor Chaplin. Her father is a successful local businessman, involved in corruption with the local council and police, who uses Helen to get to know Trevor, whose friends he sees as acting in a manner which is counterproductive to the equilibrium he sees necessary to balance his business.
- Mr McAllister – James Grout Helen's father, an affluent and less than legitimate businessman.
- Reverend Booth – Ian Bleasdale The Reverend Booth is the local vicar. Fed up with his occupation and casual in both the application of church policy, and towards life in general. He provides a cellar from where Big Al runs his "business".
- Mr Pitt (Pitt the Planner) – Robert Longden. The head of the town planning department. A meek jobsworth, he nonetheless becomes concerned about the endemic local corruption. It is revealed later in the series that he is a jazz fan.

== Production ==
=== Filming locations ===
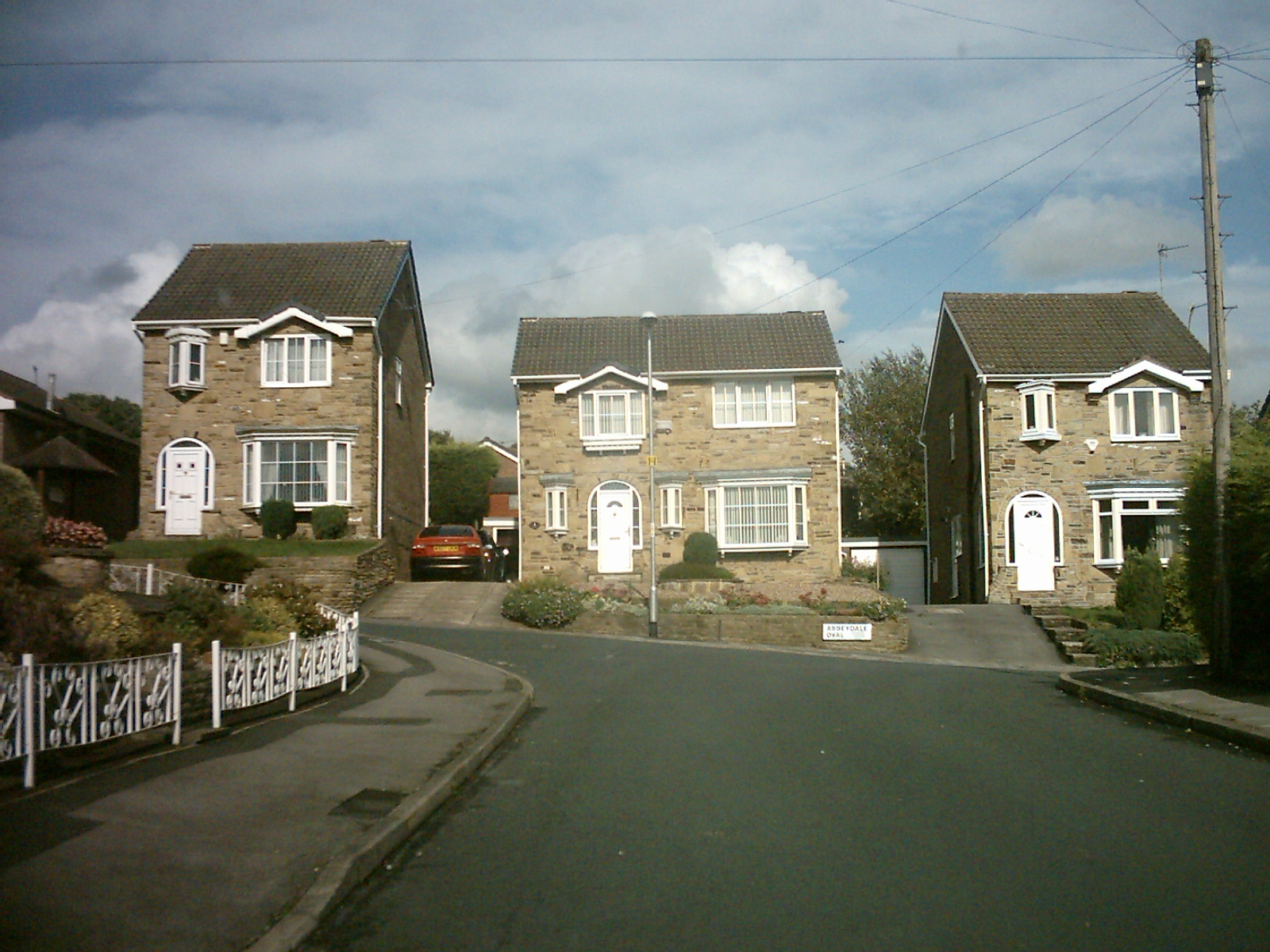
Abbeydale Oval, in Kirkstall, Leeds. The house on the right featured as Jill's house.

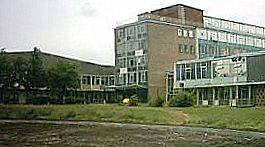
East Leeds Family Learning Centre (former Foxwood School) in Seacroft, Leeds was used as 'San Quentin High' (picture taken June 2008). Demolition of the complex began in December 2009

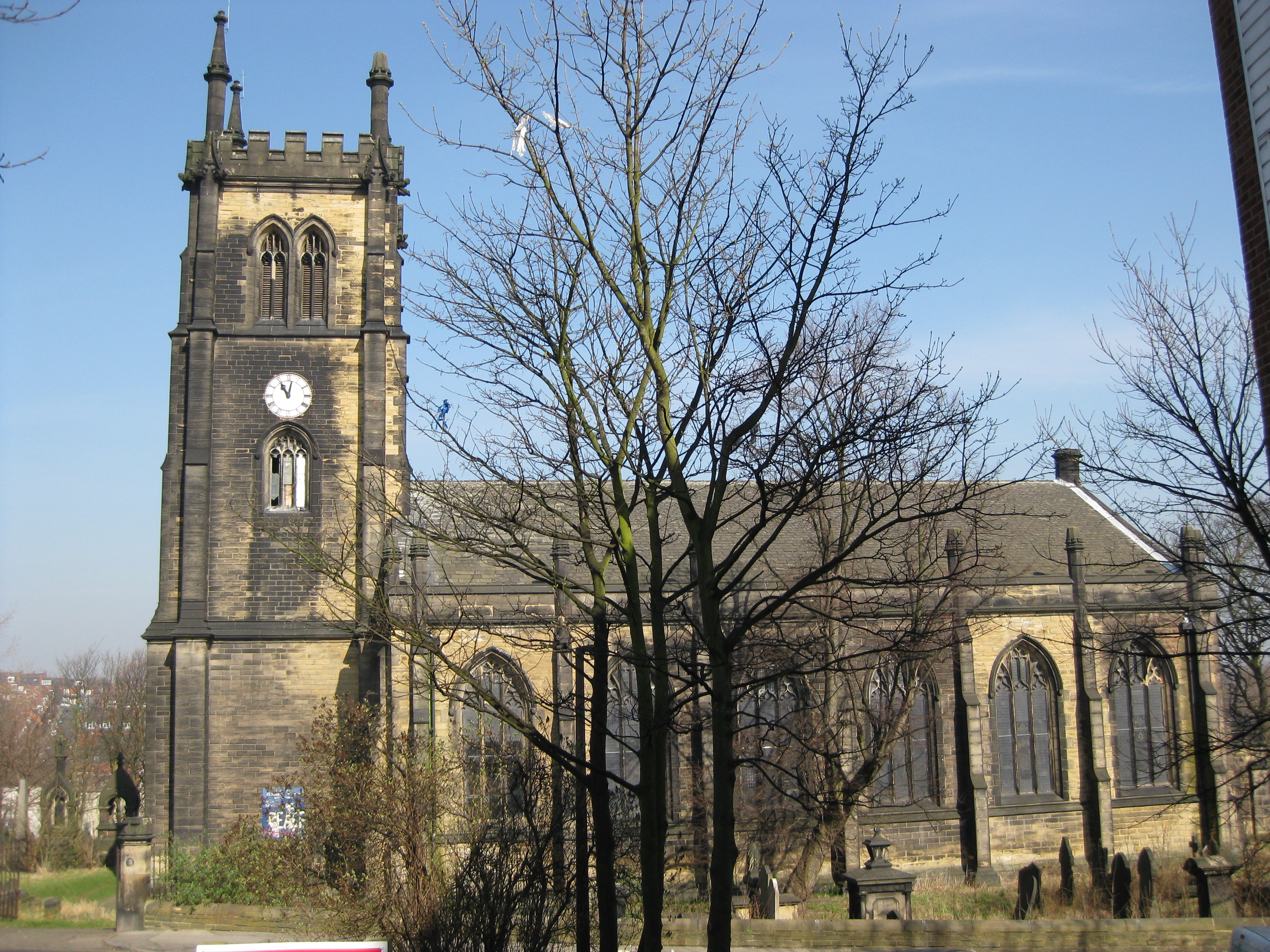
St Mark's Church in Woodhouse was the Parish Church of St Matthew in The Beiderbecke Affair. St Mark's was closed for over a decade but was bought by Gateway Church and was cleared and renovated in 2014.

- Jill's house – 39 Abbeydale Oval, Kirkstall, Leeds
- Trevor's house – 67 Clarendon Road, Woodhouse, Leeds
- Big Al's allotment and office – Ash Road Allotments, Ash Road, Headingley, Leeds 6
- St. Quentin High – Foxwood School, Seacroft, Leeds (demolished 2009) and Abbey Grange School, Horsforth Leeds
- The Alderman What's-His-Name memorial playing fields – Butcher Hill Playing Fields, Abbey Grange, Leeds
- The multi-storey block of flats – Clayton Grange Flats, Moor Grange, Leeds
- The multi-storey car park – Woodhouse Lane Multi-storey Car Park, Leeds city centre
- The Police station exterior - Horsforth Police station, Broadway, Horsforth, Leeds. (Demolished circa 2012-2014)
- The location that Trevor drives round while Jill sees Mr Pitt at the planning department is the County Hall, Wakefield, West Yorkshire but Pitt's office is on Cookridge Street, Leeds and is actually above where Revolution bar now is and the view from his window looks up Rossington Street (the old City of Leeds School is on the right, and the Merrion Centre can be seen at the top of the street).

The actual Leeds City Council planning offices are just over the road in The Leonardo building which wasn't there at the time of filming back in 1984.

- The town hall/Jill's meeting room and venue for the counting of the votes – Yeadon Town Hall, High Street, Yeadon
- The hills – Beamsley Beacon, Beamsley
- The level crossing – Forest Lane, Starbeck, Harrogate
- Grassed residential road near level crossing – Pennine Walk, Starbeck, Harrogate
- The parish church of St Matthew (exterior, and nave interior) – St Mark's Church, Woodhouse, Leeds. (Note: For a view of the original interior of St Mark's Woodhouse (now cleared out), see minutes 41–43 of episode 3 of The Beiderbecke Affair)
- The parish church of St Matthew (interior) – St Peter's Church, Stanley, Wakefield (demolished 2014)
- The steep hill that cub scout walks up followed by Trevor is Carr Lane, Rawdon, LS19
- The parish church/cub scouts meeting hall is actually St. Peters Church, Rawdon on Town Street/Layton Road, Rawdon, LS19
- The houses used as the setting for where Jill lived, which were new at the time of filming, were replaced with an older terrace house in Hill View Avenue at its junction with Norfolk Gardens in Chapel Allerton for the setting in subsequent series.
- The house that Jill and Trevor look for that they find is a demolished street is an area off Hartley Crescent/Glossop View, Woodhouse Moor, Leeds. This area is now a grassed space with some trees and benches at the top end.
- The corner of Grange Avenue, on the way from Big Al's allotment, is the corner of Grange Avenue and Windmill Lane, Yeadon.
- The telephone box that Trevor uses is at the junction of Parliament Road (now closed to traffic) and Hall Lane, near Armley Prison.
- The River Nidd and Knaresborough Viaduct can be seen in the background during Helen and Jill's night out.

== Episodes ==
The six episodes are titled by incipit, that is, the title is simply the first spoken words heard in each episode.

Trevor and Jill in the opening scene of the first episode

Episode Opening

Big Al, Trevor and Jill in the church crypt/warehouse

- "What I don't understand is this..." – Trevor orders some jazz records which fail to turn up while Jill begins her campaign to stand for the council. Sgt Hobson becomes suspicious of the activities of Trevor, Jill, Big Al, Little Norm and later Big Al's 'sister' (the platinum blonde).
- "Can anybody join in?" – After attending a local football match in order to track down his missing records, Trevor agrees to referee. The match is abandoned after the police led by Sgt Hobson raid the pitch following crowd trouble. Trevor and Big Al meet to resolve the problem with the records.
- "We call it the White Economy" – Mysterious events aimed at intimidating Jill and Trevor begin to unfold, yet there is no indication who is doing this. Jill's election meeting is sabotaged, meanwhile a former girlfriend of Trevor's 'Helen of Tadcaster' turns up unannounced at the election meeting. Meanwhile, Big Al's warehouse is subjected to a police raid.
- "Um...I know what you're thinking" – Trevor uncovers the cause of the events going on, after abducting Harry, but the motives for such still remain a mystery. Meanwhile, Jill and Helen have a meal and the two toss a coin over who gets Trevor, Helen winning.
- "That was a very funny evening" – The motives behind the recent events become clearer after the reasons behind Helen's appearance start to be realised. Meanwhile, Jill contacts the town planning department and Trevor goes to dinner at Helen's.
- "We are on the brink of a new era, if only..." – Trevor, Jill, Big Al, Little Norm, Mr Pitt and Sgt Hobson begin to gather evidence of corruption amongst local businesses, the town planning department and the local police. Jill loses the election, while Jill's and Trevor's houses are raided in an attempt to recover the evidence. Sgt Hobson presents the file to the chief constable and Chief Superintendent Forrest is sacked while Councillor McAllister and Mr McAllister are arrested by Sgt Hobson.

== Home media ==
All three series are available on DVD as individual boxed sets, and as a Collection DVD Set (the Beiderbecke Trilogy), with an additional 6 Disc Set, the Beiderbecke Trilogy 21st Anniversary Edition (containing the Beiderbecke Trilogy plus Get Lost!, CD Soundtrack, cast interviews and commemorative booklet as special features) released for Region 2. The series is also available as of 2021 on Britbox.

The Beiderbecke Tapes was released in the US on 29 September 2009.

== In other media ==
=== Books ===
There are four books associated with the series. Alan Plater's first-ever book was a novelisation of The Beiderbecke Affair (Methuen, 1985) and then he originally wrote The Beiderbecke Tapes as a novel (Methuen, 1986) before dramatising it for ITV. Four years after the final serial aired, he novelised The Beiderbecke Connection scripts (Methuen, 1992). An omnibus edition was released by Methuen in 1993.

In 2012, the British Film Institute published a book about the series in its range examining key television shows: The Beiderbecke Affair by William Gallagher. The book is non-fiction but it includes a Beiderbecke short story, "A Brief Encounter with Richard Wagner" by Alan Plater. It was written for BBC Radio 4 in the 1990s and this is its first publication in print.

Accompanying the non-fiction book, the British Film Institute released an author video plus a series of official Beiderbecke Affair podcasts that include a video interview with William Gallagher and with Plater's wife, Shirley Rubinstein, plus audio commentaries by Gallagher for selected episodes of the Beiderbecke series.

=== Show ===
A show called "Beiderbecke and All That Jazz" was developed in the mid 1990s, featuring Alan Plater and Kenny Baker.
