= The Beiderbecke Tapes =

British ITV comedy drama, 2nd of trilogy

- Genre: Comedy drama
- Written by: Alan Plater
- Directed by: Brian Parker
- Starring: James Bolam; Barbara Flynn; Dudley Sutton; Keith Smith
- Theme music composer: Frankie Trumbauer and Chauncey Morehouse
- Opening theme: "Cryin' All Day"
- Country of origin: United Kingdom
- Original language: English
- No. of episodes: 2

Production
- Executive producer: David Cunliffe
- Producer: Michael Glynn
- Production company: Yorkshire Television

Original release
- Network: ITV
- Release: 13 December – 20 December 1987

Related
- The Beiderbecke Affair; The Beiderbecke Connection

The Beiderbecke Tapes is a two-part British television drama serial written by Alan Plater and broadcast in 1987. It is the second serial in The Beiderbecke Trilogy and stars James Bolam and Barbara Flynn as schoolteachers Trevor Chaplin and Jill Swinburne. When a tape recording of a conversation about nuclear waste inadvertently falls into Trevor's hands, Trevor and Jill find themselves being pursued by national security agents.

== Plot ==
Trevor Chaplin teaches woodwork and likes to listen to jazz. Jill Swinburne teaches English and wants to help save the planet. They live together and just want a quiet life. Then they meet John the barman who died but is much better now. John gives them a tape, which leads to their meeting Dave the wimp, and which results in their harassment by government security forces. At the same time, the defrocked bank manager across the road denounces them to the headmaster of the school. They find out about The People's Front for the Liberation of West Yorkshire. Jill goes to see The Oldest Suffragette in Town. The man with no name called Peterson comes to see them. Later, six men in grey suits search the house. Trevor and Jill had been backmailed by Mr Wheeler into joining the school trip to Amsterdam, but they are delayed and never catch up with the students. In Amsterdam, Trevor and Jill meet The Honourable Order of Elks who are "looking for a bit of action". They help Jill and Trevor to escape, but they are finally sent home. The tapes are revealed as just a charade invented by shady government forces as part of a disinformation campaign.

== Characters ==
- Trevor Chaplin – James Bolam
- Jill Swinburne – Barbara Flynn
- Mr Carter – Dudley Sutton
- Mr Peterson – Malcolm Storry
- Mr Wheeler – Keith Smith
- Sylvia – Beryl Reid
- Mr Pitt – Robert Longden
- John the Barman – David Battley
- Charlie the Gravedigger – Peter Martin
- Tracy – John Alderson
- Leo – Don Fellows
- Harry – Peter Carlisle
- Sam Bentley – Victor Maddern
- Pronk – Bill Wallis
- Yvonne Fairweather – Judy Brooke
- Tour Guide – Marlous Fluitsma
- Bella Atkinson – Maggie Jones
- Dave the Wimp – Christopher Wilkinson
- Man Opposite – Dave Leslie
- Minister at Funeral – Geoff Oldham
- Man at Funeral – Alan Starkey
- Carstairs – Timothy Carlton
- First Grey Guardian (uncredited) – Philip Wilde

== Production ==
=== Structure ===
In the same style as the preceding The Beiderbecke Affair, the plot is less important than the banter and interplay between the characters. The adventure unfolds to a soundtrack of jazz music in the style of Bix Beiderbecke performed by Frank Ricotti with Kenny Baker as featured cornet soloist.

=== Filming locations ===
- Jill's house – Norfolk Green, Chapel Allerton, Leeds
- Trevor in the yellow van in traffic with impatient driver behind – Brudenell Grove, Leeds
- Trevor and Jill in the yellow van travelling to the M62 – Meadow Lane, Leeds
- San Quentin High – Foxwood School, Seacroft, Leeds
- School staff room and school hall – Moor Grange County Secondary School, Ireland Wood, Leeds
- Location where Jill and Trevor take Peterson to the canal. Is Skelton Grange Road over the Aire and Calder Navigation Canal, alongside the river Aire.
- Supermarket car park – Safeway, Roundhay Road, Oakwood, Leeds.
- Pub – The Haddon Hall, Burley, Leeds
- Post office – Town Street, Horsforth, Leeds
- Registrars office – Yeadon Yeadon Town hall
- Peterson's office – Tower House, Merrion Street, Leeds
- Cemetery scenes – Lawnswood Cemetery, Leeds
- North Sea Ferries terminal, King George Dock – Kingston upon Hull
- On board MV Norstar ferry
- Bridge Leidsegracht, Leidsestraat, Amsterdam
- Pronk's hotel – Estherea Hotel, Singel, Amsterdam
- Oude Schans, Amsterdam
- Jodenbree Straat, Amsterdam
- Amstel, Amsterdam
- Nieuwe Prinsengracht, Amsterdam
- Reguliersgracht, Amsterdam
- Herengracht, Amsterdam
- Elks coach – Nassaukade, Amsterdam
- Elks coach – A9 near Hoofddorp and Badhoevedorp
- Elks coach – A4 motorway, Netherlands
- Caledonian Hotel, Edinburgh
- Princes Street Gardens, Edinburgh
- Edinburgh Castle, Edinburgh
- "A bit of action" – Victoria Terrace and Lady Stair's Close, Edinburgh
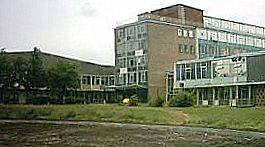
East Leeds Family Learning Centre (former Foxwood School) in Seacroft, Leeds was used as 'San Quentin High' (photographed June 2008).

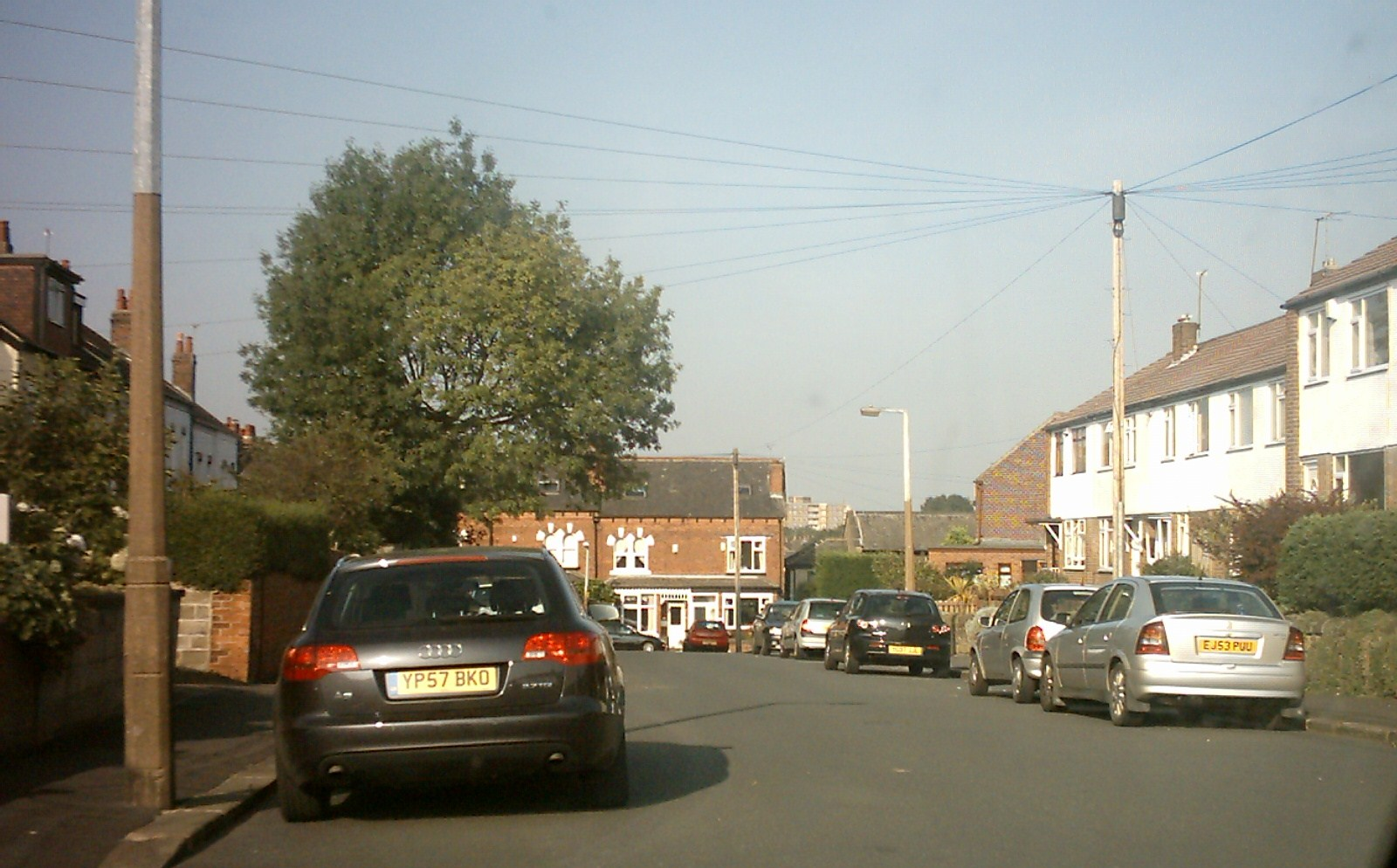
Norfolk Gardens in Chapel Allerton was used for filming in The Beiderbecke Tapes and The Beiderbecke Connection.
