= The Beiderbecke Trilogy =

British TV comedy drama serials

- Trevor Chaplin and Jill Swinburne, played by James Bolam and Barbara Flynn
- Genre: Comedy drama
- Developed by: Alan Plater
- Starring: James Bolam; Barbara Flynn; Dudley Sutton; Keith Smith
- Theme music composer: Frankie Trumbauer and Chauncey Morehouse
- Opening theme: "Cryin' All Day"
- Ending theme: "Cryin' All Day"
- Country of origin: United Kingdom
- Original language: English
- No. of series: 3
- No. of episodes: 12

Production
- Executive producers: David Cunliffe (Affair, Tapes); Keith Richardson (Connection)
- Production company: Yorkshire Television

Original release
- Network: ITV
- Release: 6 January 1985 – 18 December 1988

Related
- Get Lost!

The Beiderbecke Trilogy is a trilogy of television serials written by Alan Plater and made by Yorkshire Television for the ITV network in the United Kingdom between 1984 and 1988. Each serial centres on schoolteachers Trevor Chaplin (James Bolam) and Jill Swinburne (Barbara Flynn), who work at a rundown comprehensive school in Leeds. Woodwork teacher Trevor enjoys football and jazz music whilst English teacher Jill is a political activist concerned with saving the environment.

== Premise ==
Bix Beiderbecke. The first great white jazz musician, cornet player. Born in Davenport, Iowa, March 1903. Drank himself to death. Died August 1931, aged 28. Amazing man. They say his playing sounded like bullets shot from a bell.

— Trevor Chaplin, The Beiderbecke Affair, episode 1: "What I don't understand is this..." by Alan Plater.

The Beiderbecke Trilogy centres on two schoolteachers – Trevor Chaplin (James Bolam) and Jill Swinburne (Barbara Flynn) – who teach at a comprehensive school in Leeds, in West Yorkshire. Jill is a keen conservationist, interested in the environment as well as social issues. Trevor on the other hand is interested in jazz, football and snooker and has little interest in conservation. Jill, the more headstrong of the pair, often coaxes Trevor into involvement in her political activities.

In each of the three serials – The Beiderbecke Affair, The Beiderbecke Tapes and The Beiderbecke Connection – Jill and Trevor inadvertently become embroiled in a series of unlikely adventures involving such things as political corruption, nuclear waste dumping and serious fraud. In each serial the plot rambles, moving from one seemingly unrelated event to another, all of which are eventually shown to be interconnected. However it is the clever interplay between the characters that is the core of each of these stories.

Each episode unfolds to a soundtrack of jazz music in the style of Bix Beiderbecke performed by Frank Ricotti with Kenny Baker as featured cornet soloist. Extensive use is made of leitmotifs for the various characters. Ricotti won a BAFTA award for his work on The Beiderbecke Connection.

== Cast ==
Character	The Beiderbecke Trilogy		
Character	The Beiderbecke Affair	The Beiderbecke Tapes	The Beiderbecke Connection
Year of Release	1985	1987	1988
Trevor Chaplin	James Bolam	James Bolam	James Bolam
Jill Swinburne	Barbara Flynn	Barbara Flynn	Barbara Flynn
Mr. Carter	Dudley Sutton	Dudley Sutton	Dudley Sutton
Mr. Wheeler	Keith Smith	Keith Smith	Keith Smith
Mr Pitt	Robert Longden	Robert Longden	Robert Longden
Big Al	Terence Rigby		Terence Rigby
Little Norm	Danny Schiller		Danny Schiller
Detective Sgt. Hobson	Dominic Jephcott		Dominic Jephcott
Chief Supt. Forrest	Colin Blakely		
Helen of Tadcaster	Alison Skilbeck		
Mr. McAllister	James Grout		
Councillor McAllister	Unknown		
Peterson		Malcolm Storry	
Yvonne		Judy Brooke	Judy Brooke
Ivan			Patrick Drury
Peter			Eamon Boland

== Characters ==
=== Trevor Chaplin ===
Trevor is a middle-aged woodwork teacher. Unruffled and amiable, Trevor drifts through life with few ambitions or principles. He has an abiding passion for jazz, and is also interested in football and snooker (his footballing allegiances are unknown: he is from Tyneside but - as seen in the opening sequences of The Beiderbecke Affair - possesses a Leeds United mug. Later, reference is made to his use of the phrase "Howay the lads!", an exhortation common to both Geordies and Mackems.) At the beginning of the events portrayed, Trevor lives - in some squalor - in a rented flat at the top of a large Victorian house and drives a beaten up Bedford HA van. He later moves in with Jill, her house being one of a small terrace in Chapel Allerton. Although Trevor shows little overt interest in politics, his natural sympathies are with society's underdogs and, when provoked, he defends Jill's left leaning political views.

=== Jill Swinburne ===
Jill is a liberal minded English teacher. Jill is interested in conservation and social issues and at one point stands in a local council by-election. Jill's tastes are slightly more sophisticated than Trevor's, being interested in literature, old films and classical music. Jill is a divorcee, with negative memories of her ex-husband.

=== Mr Carter ===
Only ever referred to as Mr Carter, he is a history teacher at the same school as Jill and Trevor. Mr Carter is a solitary character, whose only friends appear to be Trevor and Jill. Mr Carter openly fancies Jill, often asking if he can sit next to her and 'kindle my desires'. He seems to make company with Trevor and Jill as they all hate Mr Wheeler, the headmaster. Mr Carter is world-weary and jaded by his job.

=== Mr Wheeler ===
Mr Wheeler is headmaster of the school, where he is equally despised by staff and pupils. Mr Wheeler is a pedantic jobsworth, with little idea what is really going on amongst staff and pupils. Mr Wheeler is a conservative character who has a clear idea of how people should live, and shows no restraint in questioning the morality of his staff's private lives.

=== Big Al ===
Big Al, along with Little Norm (who he refers to as his brother, as he does to all his friends), runs a largely legal mail order catalogue business, which after his redundancy was Big Al's way of saying 'bollocks to the system'. Big Al is the dominant and headstrong of the two, whose input to the business seems greater. He describes their business relationship by saying 'I deal with the wisdom, Norm deals with the installation'. Big Al runs his business from an allotment and a church crypt and later from a bowling green. Big Al often makes quite abstract philosophical comments, however he claims the Vicar is the professional, whereas he being an ardent atheist is just an 'enthusiastic amateur'.

=== Little Norm ===
Little Norm deals with the more menial tasks of running the business, leaving Big Al to make all of the decisions. At times Little Norm seems dismayed by Al's dominance.

=== Detective Sergeant Hobson (BA) ===
Another character whose first name is never known. Hobson is a principled, enthusiastic and somewhat naive graduate police officer. While Hobson is educated and hard-working, he is also ineffective as a police officer. Hobson participates in exposing corruption in the police force and is quickly promoted.

=== Chief Supt Forrest ===
Forrest is a cynical senior police officer, and is Hobson's superior. Forrest shows little regard for procedure and is utterly corrupt. Forrest is resentful of Hobson's middle-class upbringing, education and entry into the police force. Forrest sees Hobson as 'having it easy' as he spent his early years in the force 'stitching up pieces of dockers' in Liverpool. Although Forrest may not have such knowledge of practice or procedure he is effective in executing his business. Forrest loses his job following the exposure of his corruption. A mention of this affair by Peterson in The Beiderbecke Tapes reveals he escaped a prison sentence and was only sacked.

=== Helen of Tadcaster ===
Helen McAllister — also known by Trevor as 'Helen of Tadcaster', after Jill compares her with Helen of Troy — is Trevor's former fiancée. Helen is a feeble and impressionable character, who is privately despised by the headstrong Jill, after a drunken night out together in a restaurant.

=== Mr McAllister ===
Mr McAllister is father of Helen of Tadcaster. Mr McAllister runs a chain of chemist shops as well as other mainly corrupt businesses. Mr McAllister believes that society should have 'an equilibrium' and sees it as his duty to enforce this. Anything that threatens his businesses he sees as a threat to this equilibrium. Mr McAllister is eventually sent to prison for his corrupt dealings.

=== Councillor McAllister ===
Brother of Mr McAllister, Councillor McAllister is never seen without dark glasses, and usually driving a Jaguar. Councillor McAllister is also imprisoned for his part in the corruption scandal.

=== Peterson ===
Peterson, at first known as the 'man with no name', until Jill finally asks him his name, is an 'Old Etonian' style employee of some sort of special branch. Peterson gives the impression of being ruthless, however after making a pass at Jill he becomes unmasked as being sentimental and not particularly efficient.

=== Yvonne ===
Yvonne at first appears as a pupil in class 5C where she runs protection. She reappears as Jill and Trevor's nanny in the Beiderbecke Connection.

=== Ivan ===
Ivan is a sophisticated, public school-educated bank robber, who stole from banks using electronic bugs. He spent time in prison, and ended up staying with Jill and Trevor after being sent there under the guise as a foreign refugee. Ivan showed little interest in the money he stole, instead seeing it as a game. Ivan left with Peter from a boat in Flamborough.

=== Peter ===
Peter is Jill's ex-husband, who is an unseen character until The Beiderbecke Connection. Prior to his appearance he was mentioned, always unsympathetically. He turns up in the Beiderbecke Connection and stays with Jill and Trevor. It appears Peter knew Ivan in prison, after Peter was sent to prison following a scam involving greetings cards. Peter is somewhat suave, and always dresses in a business like fashion (in the yuppie style fashionable at the time in 1988, wearing red braces and a trench coat). Peter leaves with Ivan on a boat from Flamborough.

== Production ==
=== Origins – Get Lost! ===
Alan Plater had begun writing for television in the early 1960s and had been a regular writer on the police series Z-Cars (1962–78) and its spin-off series Softly, Softly (1966–69) and Softly, Softly: Task Force (1969–76). He had also written several plays for the BBC and ITV and wrote the sitcom Oh No, It's Selwyn Froggitt! (1974). Plater's scripts were noted for their strong depiction of the life of the inhabitants of Northern England. In 1978, Plater was commissioned by David Cunliffe, an executive producer at Yorkshire Television (YTV), to adapt the J. B. Priestley novel The Good Companions for television. Following this, Cunliffe commissioned Alan Plater to write four episodes of what Plater called a "non-violent thriller". Using characters inspired by Nick and Nora Charles, the detectives in the film The Thin Man (1934) and its sequels, Plater sought to juxtapose the conventions of the hardboiled thriller, as expounded by the likes of Raymond Chandler and Dashiell Hammett, with the mundanity of life in Yorkshire. Originally to be called "Lost And Found", the scripts were written in late 1979 and early 1980 and the result was Get Lost!, a four-part serial starring Alun Armstrong and Bridget Turner that was broadcast in June and July 1981.

The plot of Get Lost! concerns the disappearance of Jim Threadgold (Brian Southwood), husband of English teacher Judy Threadgold (Turner). Aided by her colleague, woodwork teacher Neville Keaton (Armstrong), Judy sets out to find out what has happened to her husband. Judy and Neville soon discover the existence of a secret organisation dedicated to assisting people who want to escape the mundanity of their lives and families and just disappear. Plater apportioned elements of his own interests to his two heroes, making Judy an environmental campaigner and Neville a football and jazz fan. Neville's love of jazz is reflected in the serial's soundtrack which features re-recordings, by Frank Ricotti and featuring Kenny Baker, of tracks by the likes of Duke Ellington. The same team would also provide the music for each of the Beiderbecke serials.

Get Lost! aired to respectable ratings – averaging 10.9 million viewers across its run – and Plater soon began work on a sequel. When it transpired than Alun Armstrong would not be available to reprise the role of Neville Keaton, Plater decided that, rather than recasting the role, he would create two new characters and rewrite the scripts. The sequel to Get Lost! was reworked by Plater into what was to become The Beiderbecke Affair.

=== The Beiderbecke Affair ===
The central characters Plater created for The Beiderbecke Affair – Trevor Chaplin and Jill Swinburne – were virtually identical to that of Neville Keaton and Judy Threadgold from Get Lost!. Both were teachers of woodwork and English respectively and Trevor was a fan of football and jazz music (especially Bix Beiderbecke) and Jill was an environmental activist just like Neville and Judy. Since Neville's surname had been Keaton, Plater named his new male character Chaplin (after Buster Keaton and Charlie Chaplin respectively). Similarly, since Judy Threadgold had been named in homage to Sunderland A.F.C. goalkeeper Harry Threadgold so Jill Swinburne was named after Newcastle United F.C. goalkeeper Tom Swinburne.

Plater decided that, since it would be Trevor's pursuit of a rare set of Bix Beiderbecke records that would kickstart the plot, he would use the title The Beiderbecke Affair. The individual episodes were titled from the first line of each episode e.g. "What I don't understand is this..." (episode 1), "We are on the brink of a new era, if only..." (episode 6).

The Beiderbecke Affair was broadcast in six parts in January and February 1985 and averaged 12 million viewers over its run.

=== The Beiderbecke Tapes ===
Shortly after the completion of The Beiderbecke Affair, David Cunliffe asked Plater to write a new serial with the same characters. At this point Plater decided to create a jazz-themed trilogy; The Beiderbecke Affair would be followed by The Gillespie Tapes and The Yardbird Suite, referencing Dizzy Gillespie and Charlie Parker respectively. However, YTV felt that they wanted to stick with the Beiderbecke "brand" and so the first sequel was renamed The Beiderbecke Tapes. Plater intended The Beiderbecke Tapes to be another six-part serial set in Yorkshire, the Netherlands and Athens. As well as Trevor and Jill, returning characters would include Big Al, Little Norm, Hobson (now an officer in British Intelligence), Mr Carter and the Headmaster. When financial problems at YTV delayed production, Plater reworked his scripts as a novel, also titled The Beiderbecke Tapes. YTV later decided that they would film the novel as a two-part serial, each episode of ninety minutes duration. To fit the shorter length, Big Al, Little Norm and Hobson were dropped from the script. Financial constraints meant that the action originally intended for Athens had to be relocated to Edinburgh, an event which became an in-joke when it was worked into the script as a planned trip to Greece being changed at the last minute for the trip to Scotland.

The Beiderbecke Tapes was broadcast in December 1987 and averaged 9.9 million viewers over its run. Frank Ricotti was nominated for a 1987 BAFTA Award for Original Television Music for The Beiderbecke Tapes, losing out to Porterhouse Blue.

=== The Beiderbecke Connection ===
Plater began work on The Beiderbecke Connection, the third part of the trilogy, in late 1987. At the conclusion of The Beiderbecke Tapes Jill had discovered that she was pregnant with Trevor's child. The new serial would pick up six to nine months after the birth of their child. The presence of the baby was a restricting factor on the plot; hence the introduction of the character of Yvonne, who would mind the child while Trevor and Jill went about their adventures. The plot this time called for Trevor and Jill to look after "Ivan", apparently a refugee, for Big Al and Little Norm. Plater originally intended that Trevor and Jill would have to keep Ivan hidden from his pursuers by means of different disguises and cover stories – for example, one scene called for him to pose as a school inspector – but this was dropped. A subplot concerned the challenges of teaching in the face of budget cuts that meant the necessary books and materials were not available. In this respect, Plater sought to ask the question, "If education is a universal right, if you are deprived of that by people in authority, how do you think you will resolve that?".

One major change to the production team was that David Cunliffe had by this stage moved on from YTV. He was replaced by Keith Richardson, best known as the producer of the thriller serial Harry's Game (1982). The Beiderbecke Connection was broadcast in four parts in November and December 1988 and averaged 8.8 million viewers over its run.

Frank Ricotti was again nominated and this time won the 1988 BAFTA Award for Original Television Music for The Beiderbecke Connection.

== Home media ==
All three series are available as individual DVD releases, as a boxed set, The Beiderbecke Trilogy, and as a boxed set Beiderbecke Trilogy 21st Anniversary Edition (containing The Beiderbecke Trilogy plus Get Lost!, cast interviews, CD soundtrack and collectors booklet), released on Region 2.

== In other media ==
The stories were also published as books by Alan Plater. The book of The Beiderbecke Affair was written after the TV series was made. The other two books were written before the TV shows were made and contain an earlier version of the stories. All three were later compiled into a single, omnibus edition.

Music from all three series (seasons), played by the Frank Ricotti All Stars, featuring Kenny Baker, was released as The Beiderbecke Collection on CD, LP and cassette by Dormouse Records. (The CD was re-issued with the re-issued 21st anniversary DVD set.)
