= East Leeds Family Learning Centre =

School in Leeds, England

Coordinates: 53.818070°N 1.475200°W

East Leeds Family Learning Centre (formerly Foxwood School)
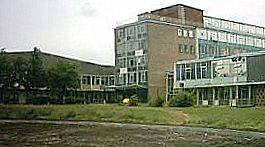

Location
- Brooklands View; Seacroft; Leeds, West Yorkshire, LS14; England

Information
- Type: Comprehensive
- Established: late 1950s
- Closed: 2009 (after use as adult education centre)
- Local authority: City of Leeds
- Head teacher: Mrs E. Silson
- Gender: mixed (male-only until the mid-1970s)
- Age: 12 to 18

East Leeds Family Learning Centre was a large Adult Education Centre in Seacroft, Leeds, England. The buildings were originally used as a secondary school, Foxwood School. The school is notable for its use for filming The Beiderbecke Trilogy between 1984 and 1988. Demolition of the buildings began in December 2009 and was completed early in 2010.

== History ==
The centre was in the buildings of the former Foxwood School, later East Leeds High School. The school originally opened as an all-boys school, but changed in September 1971 to a mixed gender school. The David Young Academy is now the largest school in Seacroft and effectively replaced East Leeds High School.

Pupils from the Seacroft area often attend John Smeaton Academy, Wetherby High School, Boston Spa School and Garforth Community College the latter three which are served by school bus routes operated by West Yorkshire Metro.

== Use in Television ==
The buildings were most notable for their use as 'San Quentin High', in the Yorkshire Television programmes The Beiderbecke Affair, The Beiderbecke Tapes and The Beiderbecke Connection. The shots used of the staff room and hall in the Beiderbecke Tapes were in fact that of Moor Grange County Secondary School in Ireland Wood. In the series, references were made to the fictional inner-city school being run-down in the later decades of its use. The internal buildings and school grounds were used for filming in the CITV series "Adam's Family Tree" which aired between 1997 and 1999.

== Demolition ==
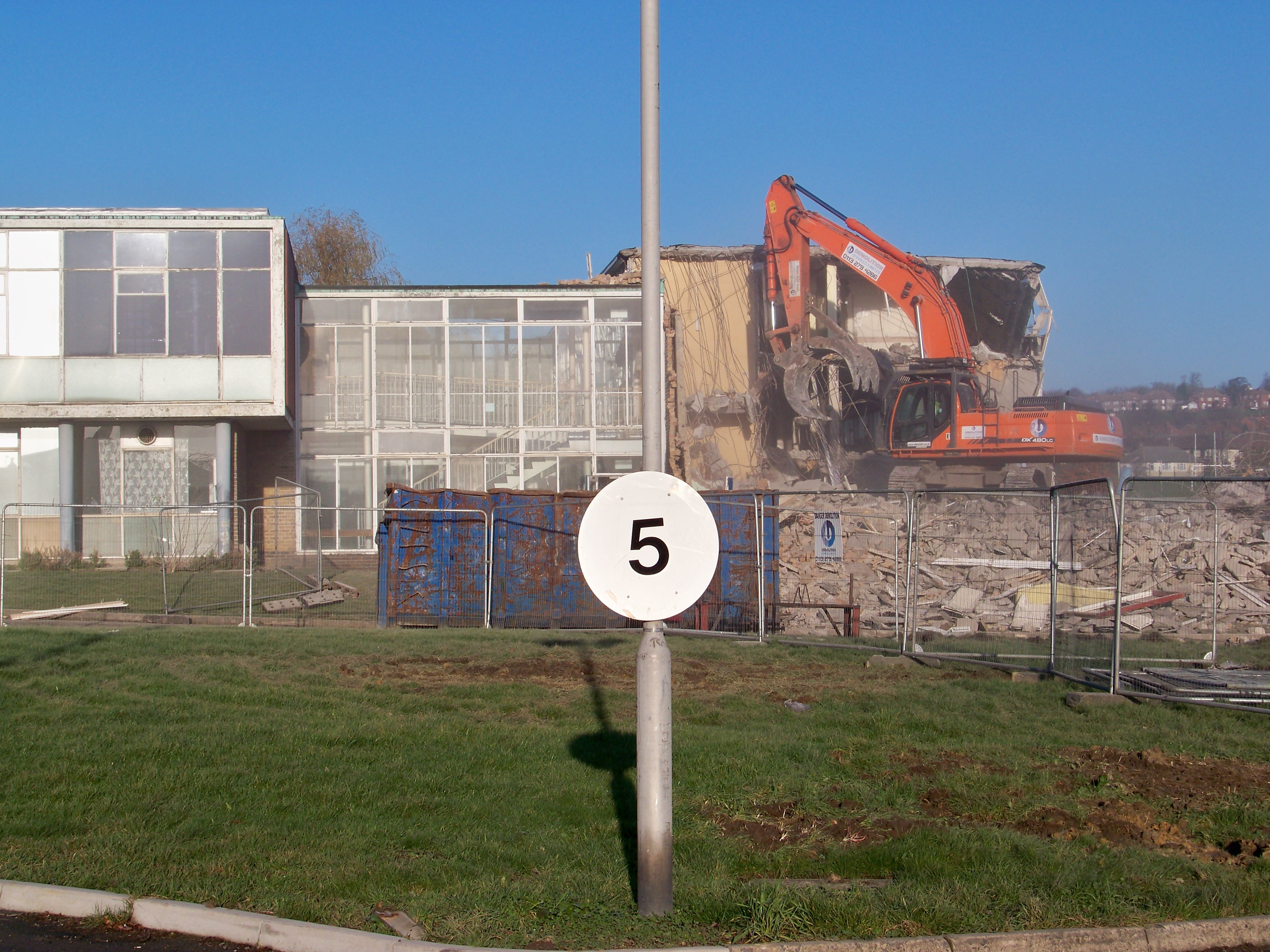
Demolition in December 2009.

The buildings were in a somewhat derelict state, built six storeys high at their tallest and set around a central courtyard. Much of the building surfaces were glazed, providing natural light throughout the corridors, which largely ran along the edge of buildings, a feature Yorkshire Television exploited for filming. Demolition began on the northern sections of the building in December 2009, following a decision by Leeds City Council that the building was unfit for purpose and uneconomic to repair.

No plans have as yet being put forward for the redevelopment of the site. Many prefabricated 'Cedarwood' houses in the area are abandoned and likely to be demolished in the near future raising the possibility that the site may be redeveloped as part of a wider scheme.

== Former staff ==
Former Labour MP Colin Burgon (for neighbouring Elmet Constituency between 1997 and 2010) was a history teacher at the school and grew up in neighbouring Gipton.
