= Judy Brooke =

English actress (born 1970)

- Born: 21 February 1970 (age 56); Leeds, West Riding of Yorkshire, Yorkshire, England
- Occupation: Actress

Judy Brooke is an English actress born in Leeds, West Riding of Yorkshire on 21 February 1970. She is perhaps best known for her roles in The Beiderbecke Trilogy and Band of Gold. She has also appeared in minor roles in other Yorkshire Television programmes.

== Roles ==
- The Beiderbecke Tapes as Yvonne (1987)
- The Beiderbecke Connection as Yvonne (1988)
- All Creatures Great and Small as Susie Thornton. Two episodes: Series 6 episode 7 - The New World (1989), Series 7, Episode 6 "Out With the New" (1990)
- Emmerdale as Paula Barker (1991)
- Coronation Street as Paula Maxwell (1992)
- Band of Gold as Secretary to Carol (series 2) (1996)
