= Keith Smith (actor) =

English actor (1926–2008)

- Born: 24 February 1926; Liverpool, Lancashire, England
- Died: 30 March 2008 (aged 82); London, England
- Years active: 1957–2008

Keith Wilfred Smith (24 February 1926 – 30 March 2008) was an English actor who is known for his roles in The Army Game and The Beiderbecke Trilogy. Smith also appeared in The Fall and Rise of Reginald Perrin as a manager of a Grot shop.

Smith also appeared in George and Mildred in the episode My Husband Next Door, on 1 November 1976 as the TV repair man taking away the Roper's TV set, in series 1.

Smith was a regular in the Q... with Spike Milligan.

He died in London on 30 March 2008 at the age of 82 from motor neurone disease.

== Filmography ==
Year	Title	Role	Notes
1955	I Am a Camera	El Dorado Patron	Uncredited
1957	The Army Game	Private Hatchett	TV series
1959	Idol on Parade	Post Corporal	
1959	The Ugly Duckling	Figures	
1959	I'm All Right Jack	Card Player (on left)	
1960	The Criminal (1960 film)	Hanson	
1960	Not a Hope in Hell	Capt. Wotherspoon	
1961	Nearly a Nasty Accident	W.O.'s Orderly	Uncredited
1961	Dangerous Afternoon	Constable Kemp	
1962	Hair of the Dog	Interviewer	
1963	Ricochet	Porter	
1963	The Small World of Sammy Lee	Joans's Client	Uncredited
1963	Heavens Above!	Leslie Hughes	Uncredited
1964	Ferry Cross the Mersey	Dawson's Chauffeur	
1964	Face of a Stranger	Ticket Collector	Edgar Wallace Mysteries
1965	Strangler's Web		Uncredited
1968	The Bliss of Mrs. Blossom	Shop steward	
1968	Headline Hunters	Fustwick	
1971	One Brief Summer	Gavin	
1971	The Magnificent Six and ½: That's All We Need		
1971	The Magnificent Seven Deadly Sins	R.A.C. Man	(segment "Pride")
1974	Professor Popper's Problem	P.C. Whitby	
1978	What's Up Nurse!	Mr. Newberry	
1984	Don't Open Till Christmas	Experience Santa	Uncredited
1985	Anna of the Five Towns	Bank clerk	1 episode
1985	The Beiderbecke Affair	Mr Wheeler	2 episodes
1985	Robbery Under Arms	Trooper Spring	
1987	The Beiderbecke Tapes	Mr. Wheeler	2 episodes
1988	The Beiderbecke Connection	Mr. Wheeler	4 episodes
1993	Splitting Heirs	Photographer	
1993	Body Snatchers	Soldier Gas Station	
1993	Heaven & Earth	G.I. #2	
1999	Captain Jack	2nd Quaker Man	(final film role)
