= Christmas at the Riviera =

- Created by: Mark Russell; Justin Sbresni
- Directed by: Mark Russell; Justin Sbresni
- Starring: Reece Shearsmith; Anna Chancellor; Pam Ferris; Barbara Flynn; Warren Clarke
- Country of origin: United Kingdom
- No. of episodes: 1

Production
- Running time: 94 minutes
- Production company: Carnival Films

Original release
- Network: ITV
- Release: 24 December 2007

Christmas at the Riviera is a 2007 British comedy drama starring Reece Shearsmith, Pam Ferris, Barbara Flynn, Warren Clarke, Alexander Armstrong, Anna Chancellor, Sam Kelly and Darren Boyd. It was written and directed by Mark Bussell and Justin Sbresni, and debuted on ITV at on Christmas Eve 2007.

== Plot summary ==
A star-studded cast check in for Christmas at the fictional Riviera Hotel in Eastbourne. The leading role is taken by Shearsmith, who plays Ashley Dodds, the assistant manager of the Riviera, who can barely hide his excitement at finally being given the opportunity to take charge of the hotel over the festive period. Consequently, he's determined to make it the establishment's best Christmas ever, but he doesn't count on the guests – a hotchpotch of individuals with an array of problems.

These include man-eating divorcee Avril (Ferris), who is looking for love; long-suffering Rita (Flynn) and her cantankerous husband Maurice (Clarke); the Reverend Miles Roger (Armstrong), a serial philanderer whose latest escapade is being investigated by the Daily Mirror, and his alcoholic wife (Chancellor); and father and son Dennis (Kelly) and Tim Dunn (Boyd), who have their own reasons for not wanting to be at home during this emotional time. All of these individuals, together with a series of mishaps at the hotel, ensure that Ashley's time in charge is a stressful one.
