= William Gallagher (writer) =

British writer and journalist

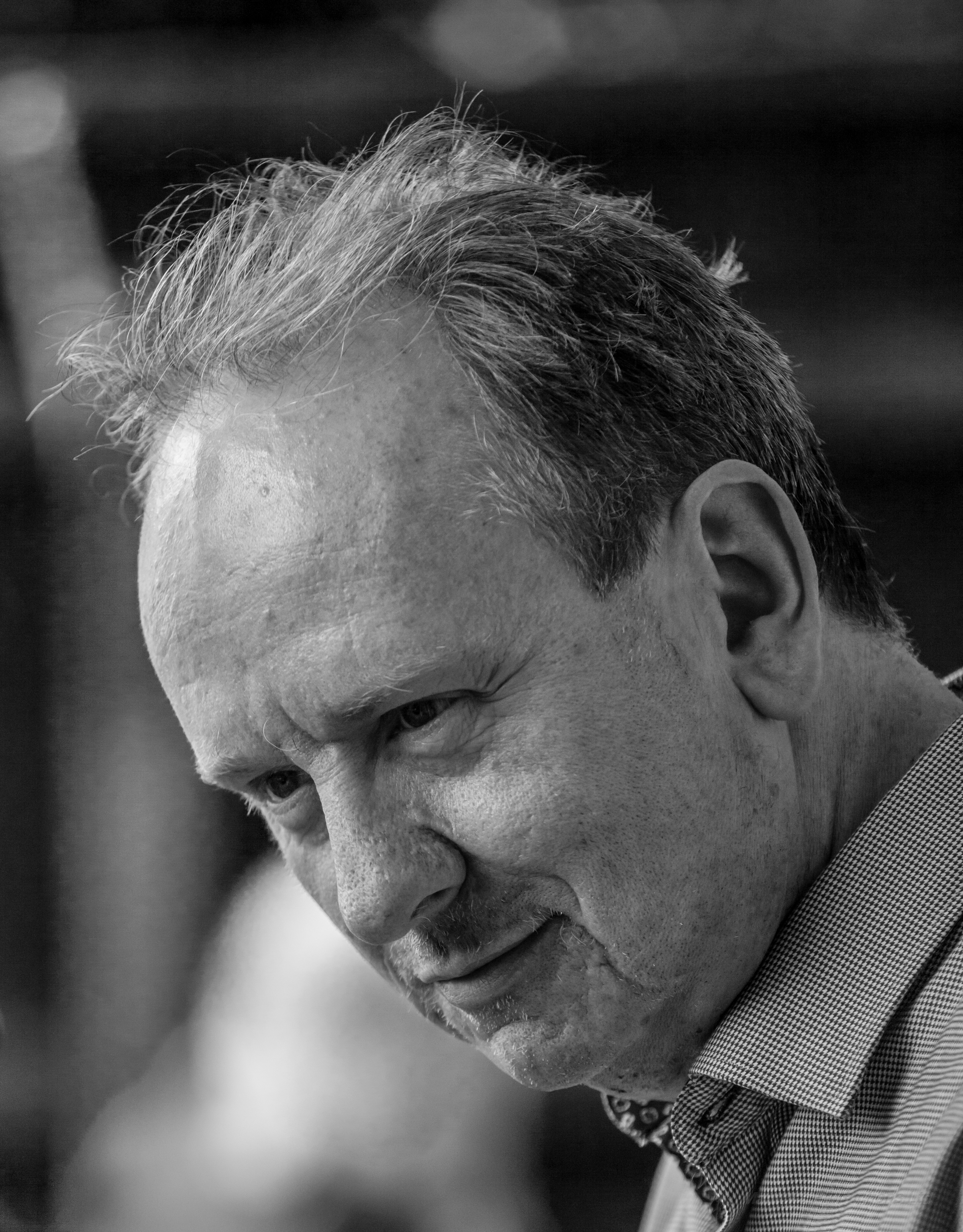
- William Gallagher at PoWWoW Litfest 2012
- Occupations: Writer; Journalist

William Gallagher's voice
recorded August 2013

William Gallagher is a British writer and journalist. He has written Doctor Who audio plays for the Big Finish range, the stage play Manhattenhenge (2008–2009) and the Rhubarb Radio series Attachment (2009). His book on Alan Plater's The Beiderbecke Affair was published by the British Film Institute and Palgrave Macmillan on 28 September 2012.

On publication of the book, he released an Author Video about the writing of it and a series of Beiderbecke podcasts: video interviews and audio commentaries for selected episodes of the Beiderbecke saga.

From 2005 to 2010 he wrote and presented UK DVD Review, a podcast that peaked in the top 25 of all iTunes podcasts in all categories worldwide (BBC News reports).

He has written for publications including The Independent, the Los Angeles Times. His journalism appears in Radio Times magazine and website, plus BBC News Online.

In March 2011 he announced on his 'Self Distract' blog that he was writing a four-part Doctor Who audio for Big Finish which is called Wirrn Isle. It was released in March 2012 and starred Colin Baker.

In February 2013 his third Big Finish story, Doctor Who: Spaceport Fear, was released. The two-hour radio comedy drama stars Colin Baker as the Doctor and Bonnie Langford as Mel with guest star Ronald Pickup.

Between December 2014 and July 2015, Gallagher wrote Apple-centric app reviews and other features on MacNN.com. He is presently doing the same at AppleInsider.com. He also co-hosts the AppleInsider Podcast with Wesley Hilliard.

Since 2020 Gallagher has been uploading videos to his own YouTube channel called 58keys, where he's mainly covering writing and productivity apps for Apple devices, and giving advice to writers about how to use them.

== Writing Credits ==
Production/Title	Company/Broadcaster	Notes/Dates
Doctor Who: Scavenger	Big Finish	Scriptwriter, full-cast audio drama, 2014
Self Distract: from Doctor Who fan to Radio Times and Big Finish	Dark Ride Publishing	Writer, book 2013
The Blank Screen	Dark Ride Publishing	Writer, book 2013
Radio Times: Cover Story	Radio Times; ISBN 978-0956752383	Co-writer, book 2013
Fat Priests	Birmingham Rep	Short play, 2013
Doctor Who: Spaceport Fear	Big Finish; ISBN 978-1781780527	Scriptwriter, full-cast audio drama, 2013
BFI Television Classics: The Beiderbecke Affair	British Film Institute; ISBN 978-1844574698	Writer, book 2012
Doctor Who: Wirrn Isle	Big Finish; ISBN 978-1844356065	Scriptwriter, full-cast audio drama, 2012
Doctor Who: The Demons of Red Lodge and Other Stories	Big Finish; ISBN 978-1844355389	Scriptwriter, full-cast audio drama, 2010
UK DVD Review	Dark Ride Productions	Review podcast, 2005–10
Attachment	Rhubarb Radio/iTunes	Scriptwriter, radio series, 2009
Manhattenhenge	Carriageworks Theatre	Scriptwriter, stage play, 2008/9
Harvest Festival, PI	Carriageworks Theatre	Scriptwriter, stage play, 2008/9
Innocence	Swan Playwright's Festival	Scriptwriter, stage play, 2008
Time and the Conway Twitty Appreciation Society	Birmingham Hippodrome	Scriptwriter, stage play, 2007
Crossroads	ITV	Scriptwriter, 2001
EastEnders	BBC website	Scriptwriter, online fiction, 1999
Casualty	BBC website	Scriptwriter, online fiction, 1999

== Awards and nominations ==
Year	Award	Work	Category	Result
2011	AAA Screenplay Contest (United States)	Wasps	TV pilot	Honourable Mention
2008	Red Planet Prize	Wasps	TV pilot	finalist
2008	Swan Playwrights Award	Innocence	One-Act Thriller	Won
