= Terence Rigby =

English actor (1937–2008)

- Rigby in No Man's Land 1978
- Born: Terence Christopher Gerald Rigby; 2 January 1937; Erdington, Birmingham, England
- Died: 10 August 2008 (aged 71); London, England
- Occupation: Actor

Terence Christopher Gerald Rigby (2 January 1937 – 10 August 2008) was an English actor, most notable for playing police dog-handler PC Snow in the long-running series Softly, Softly: Task Force (1967).

Other credts include Dixon of Dock Green (1964-1967), Get Carter (1971), Watership Down (1978), Tinker Tailor Soldier Spy (1979), The Hound of the Baskervilles (1982), The Beiderbecke Connection (1985), Crossroads, Kings Oak (1987-1988), Boon (1991), Lovejoy (1994), Tomorrow Never Dies (1997), Born to Run (1997), Elizabeth (1998), Mona Lisa Smile (2003), Colour Me Kubrick (2006), and Flick (2008).

== Early life ==
Terence Rigby was born in Erdington, Birmingham, and was educated at St Philip's School. He was trained at RADA and had his national service in the Royal Air Force.

== Career ==
His film roles included Get Carter (1971), Watership Down (1978), Tomorrow Never Dies (1997), Elizabeth (1998), Mona Lisa Smile (2003) and Colour Me Kubrick (2006).

His notable television roles included Dixon of Dock Green (1964-1967), Softly, Softly: Task Force (1967); Z-Cars (1968), The First Lady (1969), Callan(1969), The Saint (1966-1968), Public Eye (1968 & 1971), Edward & Mrs. Simpson (1978), Tinker Tailor Soldier Spy (1979); Airline (1982), Rumpole of the Bailey (1983), Boon (1991), Lovejoy (1994), Our Friends in the North (1996), Born to Run (1997), Holby City (1999 & 2003), Midsomer Murders (1999), Crossroads, Kings Oak (1987-1988), (playing the part of motel boss, Tommy Lancaster), The Beiderbecke Affair and The Beiderbecke Connection (1985). He was also Dr Watson to Tom Baker's Sherlock Holmes in a BBC version of The Hound of the Baskervilles (1982).

Among his stage credits was the role of Joey in the original Peter Hall production of Harold Pinter's The Homecoming (1965), which he repeated on Broadway in 1967. Hall later cast him as Briggs in the première of No Man's Land at the National Theatre in 1975, alongside John Gielgud and Ralph Richardson. The production played on Broadway the following year. In 1977, Rigby received considerable acclaim for his portrayal of Joseph Stalin in another National Theatre production, Robert Bolt's State of Revolution, opposite Michael Bryant's Lenin. He returned twice more to Broadway, first in 1995, doubling as the Ghost, the Player King, and the Gravedigger in Jonathan Kent's Almeida production of Hamlet, starring Ralph Fiennes; and then again in 1999 as Count Orsini-Rosenberg in Peter Hall's production of Amadeus, starring David Suchet and Michael Sheen.

Segments from Rigby's abbreviated autobiography, begun shortly before his death, are included in the book by his long-time friend, the television and radio dramatist Juliet Ace, Rigby Shlept Here: A Memoir of Terence Rigby 1937-2008. Along with correspondence and interviews with his friends and theatrical colleagues, Ace's memoir draws on her own diaries and shows much of the working actor and private man who remained a mystery to those close to him. It was published in November 2014.

== Death ==
Rigby died at home in London on 10 August 2008 of lung cancer.

== Partial filmography ==
- Accident (1967) – Plain Clothed Policeman
- Get Carter (1971) – Gerald Fletcher
- The Homecoming (1973) – Joey
- Watership Down (1978) – Silver (voice)
- Tinker Tailor Soldier Spy (1979, TV miniseries) – Roy Bland
- The Dogs of War (1980) – Hackett
- The Hound of the Baskervilles (1982, TV miniseries) - Dr. Watson
- Anyone for Denis? (1982, TV movie) – Major
- The Sign of Four (1983, TV movie) – Inspector Layton
- Testimony (1988) – Joseph Stalin
- Scandal (1989) – James Burge
- The Children (1990) – Duke of Mendip
- The Young Americans (1993) – Sidney Callow
- Funny Bones (1995) – Billy Man
- England, My England (1995) – Captain Henry Cooke
- Tomorrow Never Dies (1997) – General Bukharin
- Elizabeth (1998) – Bishop Stephen Gardiner
- Plunkett and Macleane (1999) – Harrison
- Simon Magus (1999) – Bratislav
- The Strange Case of Delphina Potocka of The Mystery of Chopin (1999) – Sydow
- Essex Boys (2000) – Henry Hobbs
- Mrs Caldicot's Cabbage War (2002) – Henry Caldicot
- Mona Lisa Smile (2003) – Dr. Edward Staunton
- Colour Me Kubrick (2006) – Norman
- Flick (2008) – Creeper Martin (final film role)
