= Dominic Jephcott =

English actor and writer

- Born: July 28, 1957 (age 69); Coventry, Warwickshire, England
- Education: Royal Academy of Dramatic Art
- Occupations: Actor, writer
- Years active: Child actor, then 1977–present
- Spouse: Kelleigh Greenberg-Jephcott

Dominic Jephcott (born 28 July 1957) is an English actor and writer. He is known for his work in The Beiderbecke Affair, The Beiderbecke Connection, Midsomer Murders, and in Holby City and Casualty, as the adulterous surgeon Alistair Taylor.

== Early life and education ==
Jephcott was born in Coventry, Warwickshire, and worked professionally as a child actor. He graduated from the Royal Academy of Dramatic Art in 1975, became a member of the Royal Shakespeare Company in 1977, and later worked extensively in television.

== Acting career ==
Jephcott played Sir Andrew Ffoulkes in The Scarlet Pimpernel, Mount in Good and Bad at Games, Reggie in The Jewel in the Crown, Det. Sgt. Hobson BA in The Beiderbecke Affair (later Det. Insp. Hobson PhD in The Beiderbecke Connection), Capt. Sandy Ransom in "Rumpole and the Bright Seraphim", Magnus Strove in Paradise Postponed, David Warner in The Bill, George Compton in A Touch of Frost, Dr. Sam Fallowfield in Dalziel and Pascoe, Simon Dymock in Judge John Deed, Suspicious Monk in Relic Hunter, Father Jonathan in Doctors, Peter Gosford in Casualty and Alistair Taylor in Holby City. He was David Durance in the first London production of Indian Ink.

Jephcott appeared in two episodes of Midsomer Murders as two different characters: "Death's Shadow" and seven years later in 2006, "Four Funerals and a Wedding".

His film credits include All Quiet on the Western Front (1979), the horror film Inseminoid (1981), The Opium War (1997), An African Dream (1990), and O Jerusalem (2006). Jephcott has also worked in radio including the part of Marlowe in The Christopher Marlowe Mysteries. This aired briefly on BBC Radio 4 in 1993.

== Personal life ==
Jephcott is married to author Kelleigh Greenberg-Jephcott. They have collaborated on screenplays selected by the Academy of Motion Picture Arts and Sciences’ Nicholl Fellowship, the Austin Film Festival, and Francis Ford Coppola’s American Zoetrope.

== Filmography ==
Year	Film or Television	Role	Ref
1979	All Quiet on the Western Front	Peter Leer	
1980	War Game	Untersturmbannfuhrer Kleist	
1981	Inseminoid	Dean	
1981	All's Well That Ends Well	Second French Lord	
1982	Stalky and Co. Part 5 "A Little Prep"	Purvis	
1982	The Scarlet Pimpernel	Sir Andrew Ffoulkes	
1982	A New Life	Sebastian	
1982	Ivan the Ninny	Brother	
1983	Good and Bad at Games	Mount	
1983	The Aerodrome	Flt Lieut Mark	
1984	The Jewel in the Crown Episode 1 "Crossing the River"	Reggie	
1985	Oliver Twist Parts 8, 10 and 11	Harry Maylie	
1985	That Was a Very Funny Evening	cast member	
2001–2002	Holby City	Alistair Taylor	
2004	The Brief	Donald Bell	
Note: This table is incomplete and Jephcott's filmography from 1979 to 2013 can be found at here

== Theatre performances (selected) ==
Year	Play	Author	Role	Theatre	Ref
1994	Gaucho	Doug Lucie	Spencer Taplow	Hampstead Theatre	
2007	Fallujah	Jonathan Holmes	US general	Truman Brewery	
2008	Scenes from a Marriage	Peter, Arne	Ingmar Bergman	Belgrade Theatre, Coventry	
2015–2016	King Charles III		Mike Bartlett	UK tour	
