= Moor Grange County Secondary School =

Former boys' school in Leeds, England

Coordinates: 53.839°N 1.603°W

Information
- Established: 1960

Moor Grange County Secondary School was an all-boys school located in the Leeds postal district of Leeds 16 at the junction of Parkstone Avenue and the West Park section of the Leeds Outer Ring Road. Although it was named Moor Grange, it was actually located in the Ireland Wood area with Moor Grange Estate being located just across the ring road. The school had a main section four storeys high. The science block was located on the top of a two-storey building above the woodwork, metalwork, science and art rooms. It also had a set of annexes used as classrooms adjacent to the playground. The school was renamed Moor Grange High School in the 1970s. It was demolished in the late 1980s and is now the site of His Majesty's Revenue and Customs house and a new road named Redvers Close.

The school opened in 1960 for years from nearby West Park County Secondary School which reverted to its original purpose as an all-girls school from September 1961 after the last class of boys left.

== Appearances in popular culture ==
The school staff room and hall were used for the filming of The Beiderbecke Tapes in 1987, shortly before the school's demolition. However, the exterior shots of the school were of Foxwood School in Seacroft.

== Notable pupils ==
- Sir Ian McGeechan OBE - rugby union player and coach
