= Barbara Flynn =

British actress (born 1948)

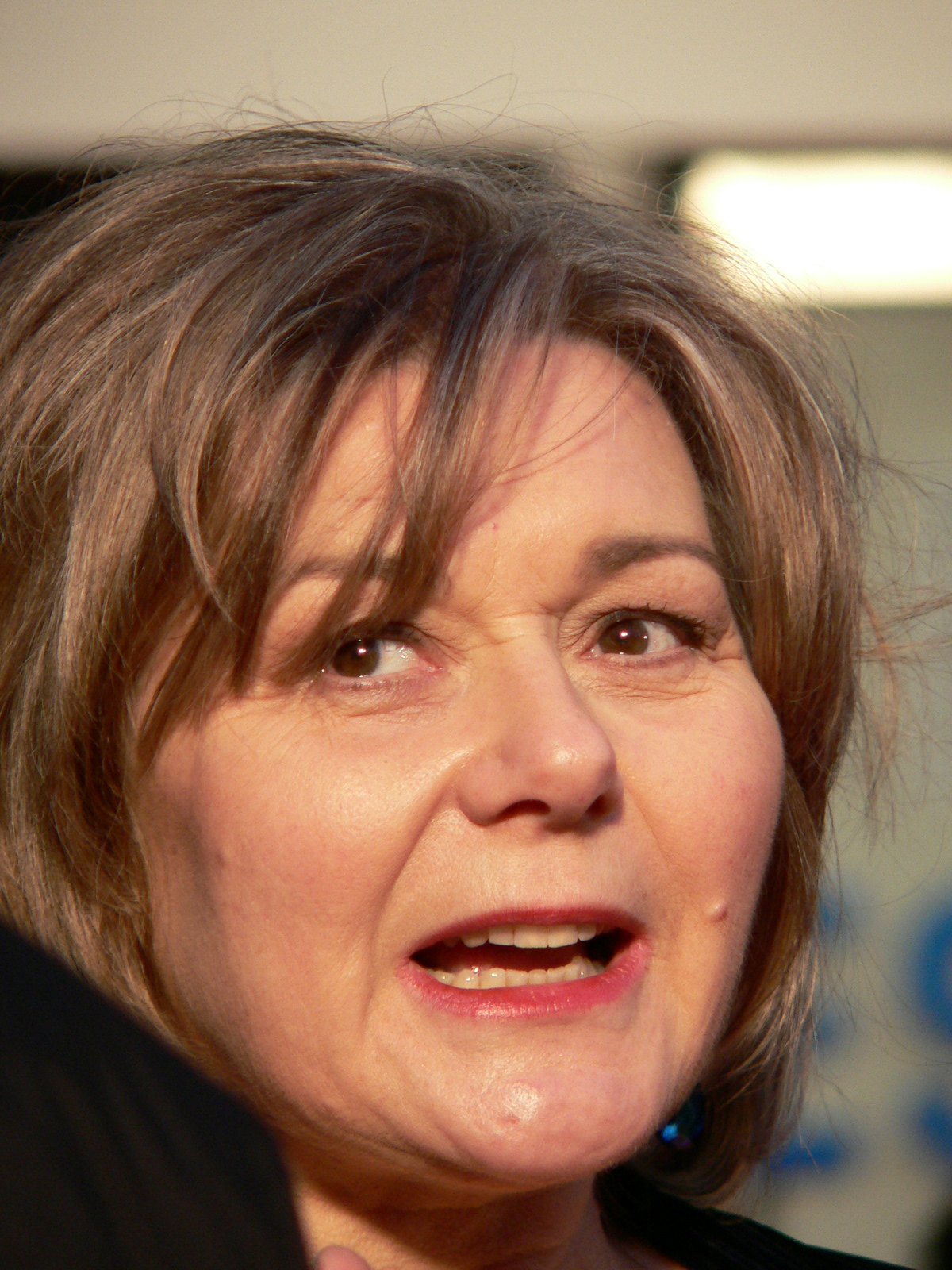
- Flynn in 2006
- Born: Barbara Joy McMurray; 5 August 1948 (age 78); St Leonards-on-Sea, Sussex, England
- Education: Guildhall School of Music and Drama
- Occupation: Actress
- Years active: 1970–present
- Spouse: Jeremy Taylor (m. 1982; died 2017)
- Children: 1

Barbara Joy Flynn (born Barbara Joy McMurray, 5 August 1948) is an English actress. She first came to prominence playing Freda Ashton in the ITV drama series A Family at War (1970–1972). She went on to play the milk woman in the BBC comedy Open All Hours (1976–1985), Jill Swinburne in The Beiderbecke Trilogy (1985–1988), Dr. Rose Marie in the BBC series A Very Peculiar Practice (1986–1988), Judith Fitzgerald in the ITV drama Cracker (1993–1995), and Mrs. Jamieson in Cranford (2007–2009). In 2021, she appeared in Doctor Who: Flux as Tecteun, a founder of Time Lord society and The Doctor's adoptive mother. Starting in 2023, she acted in Beyond Paradise, playing the mother of the detective's girlfriend. This included some episodes in 2024 where she was reunited with Peter Davison, her A Very Peculiar Practice co-star.

In her own words, she tends to play "feisty, strong women".

== Personal life ==
Flynn was born as Barbara Joy McMurray, in St Leonards-on-Sea, Sussex. Her Irish father, Dr James McMurray, was a pathologist. Her mother was Joy (or Joyce) Crawford Hurst. Flynn attended St Mary's Convent School, Hastings. She then trained at the Guildhall School of Music and Drama (where she was awarded the Gold Medal in 1968) before appearing in repertory theatre.

Flynn married television producer and science writer Jeremy Taylor in 1982. The couple had a son, born in 1990. Taylor died on 17 July 2017.

== Filmography ==
=== Film ===
| Year | Title | Role | Notes |
|---|---|---|---|
| 1982 | Britannia Hospital | Private Nurse | |
| 1990 | Quick Change | Hostage | |
| 1999 | You're Dead | Professor Corner | |
| 1999 | The Escort | Kim's Mother | |
| 2006 | Miss Potter | Helen Potter | |
| 2009 | Burlesque Fairytales | Mrs. Argyle | |
| 2012 | Cheerful Weather for the Wedding | Aunt Bella | |
| 2014 | The Christmas Candle | Lady Camdon | |

=== Television ===
| Year | Title | Role | Notes |
|---|---|---|---|
| 1970–1972 | A Family at War | Freda MacKenzie (née Ashton) | Main role, 40 episodes |
| 1972 | Thirty Minutes Worth | Various characters | Episode: "1.6" |
| 1972 | Z-Cars | Jane Wardle | Episode: "Old Acquaintance" |
| 1975 | Centre Play | Angie | Episode: "The Flight Fund" |
| 1976 | Couples | Sally Mackworth | Episodes: "1.58", "1.59", "1.60" |
| 1976 | ITV Sunday Night Drama | Beryl | Episode: "Afternoon Dancing" |
| 1977 | Murder Most English: A Flaxborough Chronicle | Pauline Sutton | Episode: "The Flaxborough Crab: Part 2" |
| 1977, 1981, 1982 | Play for Today | Monica Potter, Margaret Hanson, Jill | Episodes: "Love on a Gunboat", "No Visible Scar", "A Mother Like Him" |
| 1980 | Keep It in the Family | Marlene | Episode: "Phoney Business" |
| 1980 | BBC2 Playhouse | Heather | Episode: "Standing in for Henry" |
| 1981 | Second Chance | Sarah Fletcher | Episode: "October" |
| 1981 | The Bagthorpe Saga | Sue | Episode: "Absolute Zero: Part 2" |
| 1981 | Maybury | Dorothy Kemp | Episodes: "Mary", "Hugo" |
| 1981 | The Last Song | Shirley | 6 episodes |
| 1981 | The Gentle Touch | Sandy | Episode: "Protection" |
| 1981–1982, 1985 | Open All Hours | The Milk Woman | Guest role (series 2–4), 11 episodes |
| 1982 | The Further Adventures of Lucky Jim | Joanna Lassiter | Episodes: "The Big Smoke", "A Foot in the Door", "Scoop", "The Ties That Bind" |
| 1982 | The Barchester Chronicles | Mary Bold | Miniseries, 6 episodes |
| 1985 | The Beiderbecke Affair | Jill Swinburne | Miniseries, 6 episodes |
| 1986 | Day To Remember | Judy | TV film |
| 1986 | Season's Greetings | Belinda | TV film |
| 1986–1988 | A Very Peculiar Practice | Dr. Rose Marie | Main role, 14 episodes |
| 1987 | The Beiderbecke Tapes | Jill Swinburne | Miniseries, 2 episodes |
| 1987 | Inspector Morse | Monica Height | Episode: "The Silent World of Nicholas Quinn" |
| 1988 | The Beiderbecke Connection | Jill Swinburne | Miniseries, 4 episodes |
| 1989 | Theatre Night | Jane | Episode: "Benefactors" |
| 1990 | The Justice Game | Eleanor Goodchild | Episodes: "The Lady from Rome: Parts 1–3" |
| 1991 | Joshua Jones | Fiona Cashmore, Dakasha Karia, Daphne Peacock, Additional voices | 12 episodes |
| 1992 | Boon | Sheila Green | Episode: "Queen's Gambit" |
| 1993 | Maigret | Madame Maigret | Episodes: "Maigret on the Defensive", "Maigret's Boyhood Friend", "Maigret and the Minister" |
| 1993–1995 | Cracker | Judith Fitzgerald | Main role, 20 episodes |
| 1994 | Chandler & Co | Dee Chandler Tate | Main role, 6 episodes |
| 1997 | Scene | (unknown) | Episode: "A Man of Letters" |
| 1997 | The Vanishing Man | Ms. Jeffries | TV film |
| 1998 | Dear Nobody | Chris's Mother | TV film |
| 1998 | Performance | Goneril | Episode: "King Lear" |
| 1999 | Wives and Daughters | Miss Browning | Miniseries, 4 episodes |
| 2000 | Lorna Doone | Sarah Ridd | TV film |
| 2001 | Perfect | Imogen | TV film |
| 2002 | The Law | Eleanor Kimbrough | TV film |
| 2002 | Night Flight | Moira | TV film |
| 2002 | The Forsyte Saga | Emily Forsyte | Regular role, 6 episodes |
| 2003 | Hornblower: Loyalty | Mrs. Mason | TV film |
| 2003 | Murder in Mind | Grace Fisher | Episode: "Stalkers" |
| 2003 | Sweet Medicine | Jane Frampton | Episode: "1.3" |
| 2003 | Hornblower: Duty | Mrs. Mason | TV film |
| 2004 | The Inspector Lynley Mysteries | Maureen Finnegan | Episode: "If Wishes Were Horses" |
| 2004 | Poirot | Mrs. Allerton | Episode: "Death on the Nile" |
| 2004 | He Knew He Was Right | Mrs. French | Miniseries, 3 episodes |
| 2005 | Sea of Souls | Lt. Col. Petra Summers | Episodes: "Omen: Parts 1 & 2" |
| 2005 | Malice Aforethought | Julia Bickleigh | TV film |
| 2005 | Elizabeth I | Mary, Queen of Scots | Miniseries, 2 episodes |
| 2006 | The Line of Beauty | Sally Tipper | Episode: "To Whom Do You Beautifully Belong" |
| 2006 | Cracker | Judith Fitzgerald | TV special of the main TV series |
| 2007 | Dalziel and Pascoe | Narrator of TV Documentary | Episode: "Project Aphrodite: Part 1" (uncredited role) |
| 2007 | The Marchioness Disaster | Eileen Dallaglio | TV film |
| 2007 | Christmas at the Riviera | Rita | TV film |
| 2007–2009 | Cranford | Mrs. Jamieson | Main role, 8 episodes |
| 2008 | 10 Days to War | Clare Short | Miniseries, Episode: "These Things Are Always Chaos" |
| 2008 | Doctor Who: The Eighth Doctor Adventures | Croc Trooper / Sister Chalice (voice) | Episode: "The Skull of Sobek" |
| 2009 | New Tricks | Carole Milburn | Episode: "Blood Is Thicker Than Water" |
| 2009 | The Queen | Queen Elizabeth II | Episode: "The Enemy Within" |
| 2011 | Silent Witness | Carol Fisher | Episodes: "Lost: Parts 1 & 2" |
| 2011 | Midsomer Murders | Millie Bullard | Episode: "The Oblong Murders" |
| 2011 | Just Henry | Mrs. Beaumont | TV film |
| 2012 | The Borgias | Isabella | Episode: "The Choice" |
| 2013 | Moving On | Carol | Episode: "The Shrine" |
| 2013 | Pat & Cabbage | Pat | Main role, 6 episodes |
| 2014 | 1864 | Queen Victoria | Episode: "1.3" |
| 2016–2019 | The Durrells | Aunt Hermione | 5 episodes |
| 2019 | Killing Eve | Julia | Episode: "Do You Know How to Dispose of a Body?" |
| 2020 | Death in Paradise | Patti Grenson | Episode: "A Murder in Portrait" |
| 2020–2022 | Kate & Koji | Councillor Lavinia Bone | Main role, 10 episodes |
| 2021 | Doctor Who | Awsok / Tecteun | Episodes: "Once, Upon Time", "Survivors of the Flux" |
| 2022 | Doctor Who: The Fifth Doctor Adventures | Professor Vansom (voice) | Episode: "Secrets of Telos" |
| 2023–present | Beyond Paradise | Anne Lloyd | Main role, 20 episodes |

=== Narration ===
In addition to her acting work, Flynn has provided voice-overs for numerous TV documentaries, including:

- Body Styles (1989)
- Time of Her Life (1993)
- Network First (1 episode; 1997)
- The Lost Gardens of Heligan (1997)
- The Real... (1 episode; 1999)
- The Man Who Would be Kubrick (1999)
- Deaf Century (3 episodes; 1999)
- The 1900 House (1999)
- Horizon (8 episodes, 1999–2008)
- When Pat Phoenix Met Tony Booth (2002)
- Rosalind Franklin: DNA's Dark Lady (2003)
- The 50s and 60s in Living Colour (2003)
- George Orwell: A Life in Pictures (2003)
- Diana Mosley: Adolf, Oswald and Me (2003)
- Your Life in Their Hands (1 episode; 2004)
- From Here to Paternity (2004)
- The Monastery (2005)
- The Ghost in Your Genes (2005)
- Timeshift (2 episodes; 2005)
- The Queen's Castle (2005)
- You Don't Know You're Born (3 episodes; 2007)
- There's Something About... Morse (2007)
- Queen Camilla (2007)
- Guarding the Queen (2007)
- The Restaurant (1 episode; 2008)
- The Lion Cub from Harrods (2009)
- Cutting Edge (1 episode; 2010)
- Big Fat Gypsy Weddings (14 episodes; 2011–2013)
- Jet! When Britain Ruled the Skies (2 episodes; 2012)
- Hillsborough: The Search for the Truth (2012)
- The Flying Scotsman: A Rail Romance (2013)
- The Planners (8 episodes; 2013)
- Permission Impossible: Britain's Planners (8 episodes; 2014)
- Countdown to Murder (8 episodes; 2021)
- 1978: The Winter of Discontent (2022)
- Diana: the Curse of the Spencers (2022)
- The Kardashians: Billion Dollar Dynasty (2 episodes; 2023)
- Morse and the Last Endeavour (2023)

=== Video games ===
| Year | Title | Role | Notes |
|---|---|---|---|
| 2020 | The Waylanders | (voice) | |

=== Theatre work ===
Flynn appeared in the Birmingham Repertory Theatre production of Pythagoras in 1976. This was a new play by Danny Abse. In 2016, she appeared in the world premiere production of Elegy at the Donmar Warehouse.
