= Dudley Sutton =

English actor (1933–2018)

- Sutton in 1961
- Born: 6 April 1933; Kingston upon Thames, Surrey, England
- Died: 15 September 2018 (aged 85); Clapham, London, England
- Occupation: Actor
- Years active: 1957–2018
- Spouse: Marjorie Steele (m. 1961; div. 1965)
- Children: 3

Dudley Sutton (6 April 1933 – 15 September 2018) was an English actor. Active in radio, stage, film and television, he was best known for his role of Tinker Dill in the BBC Television comedy/drama series Lovejoy.

== Early life ==
Sutton was born in Kingston upon Thames, and educated at a boys' boarding school at Lifton Park, Devon. He served in the Royal Air Force as a mechanic before enrolling in the Royal Academy of Dramatic Art, from which he was later expelled for responding to rock-and-roll.

== Career ==
After early stage work with Joan Littlewood's Theatre Workshop, Sutton became known for his unusual roles in two films directed by Sidney J. Furie. He played a frustrated teenager accused with his friends of murder in The Boys (1962) and a gay biker in The Leather Boys (1964), both parts showing his potential for offbeat screen personae. At a reunion of the three surviving stars of the earlier film at Elstree Studios on 17 September 2017, Sutton related that he felt himself privileged that these films had dealt with two matters close to his heart: the iniquity of the death penalty, and gay rights.

On stage, he played the title role in the original production of Joe Orton's Entertaining Mr Sloane (1964), and transferred with it to Broadway the following year. From 25 May 1966, he appeared in Tango, a play by Slawomir Mrozek at the Aldwych Theatre alongside Patience Collier, Peter Jeffrey, Mike Pratt, and Ursula Mohan under director Trevor Nunn.

Sutton appeared in many films during his career, including Rotten to the Core (1965), Crossplot (1969), The Devils (1971), Madame Sin (1972), The Pink Panther Strikes Again (1976), Fellini's Casanova (1976), Edward II (1991), and The Football Factory (2004).

Among his many television appearances were his roles as Tinker Dill in Lovejoy (1986 and 1991–94) – whose friendship with Lovejoy, the title character, and expertise in the antique trade was the backbone of the show – as Mr Carter in the Beiderbecke Trilogy and as Oleg Kirov in Smiley's People (1982). He also featured as Max Deller, a career criminal involved in a heist of gold bullion in The Sweeney episode "Golden Boy" and in a Christmas special episode of Porridge (1976) as the somewhat unstable, prison trusty-turned-hostage-taker Reg Urwin, with Ronnie Barker and Richard Beckinsale.

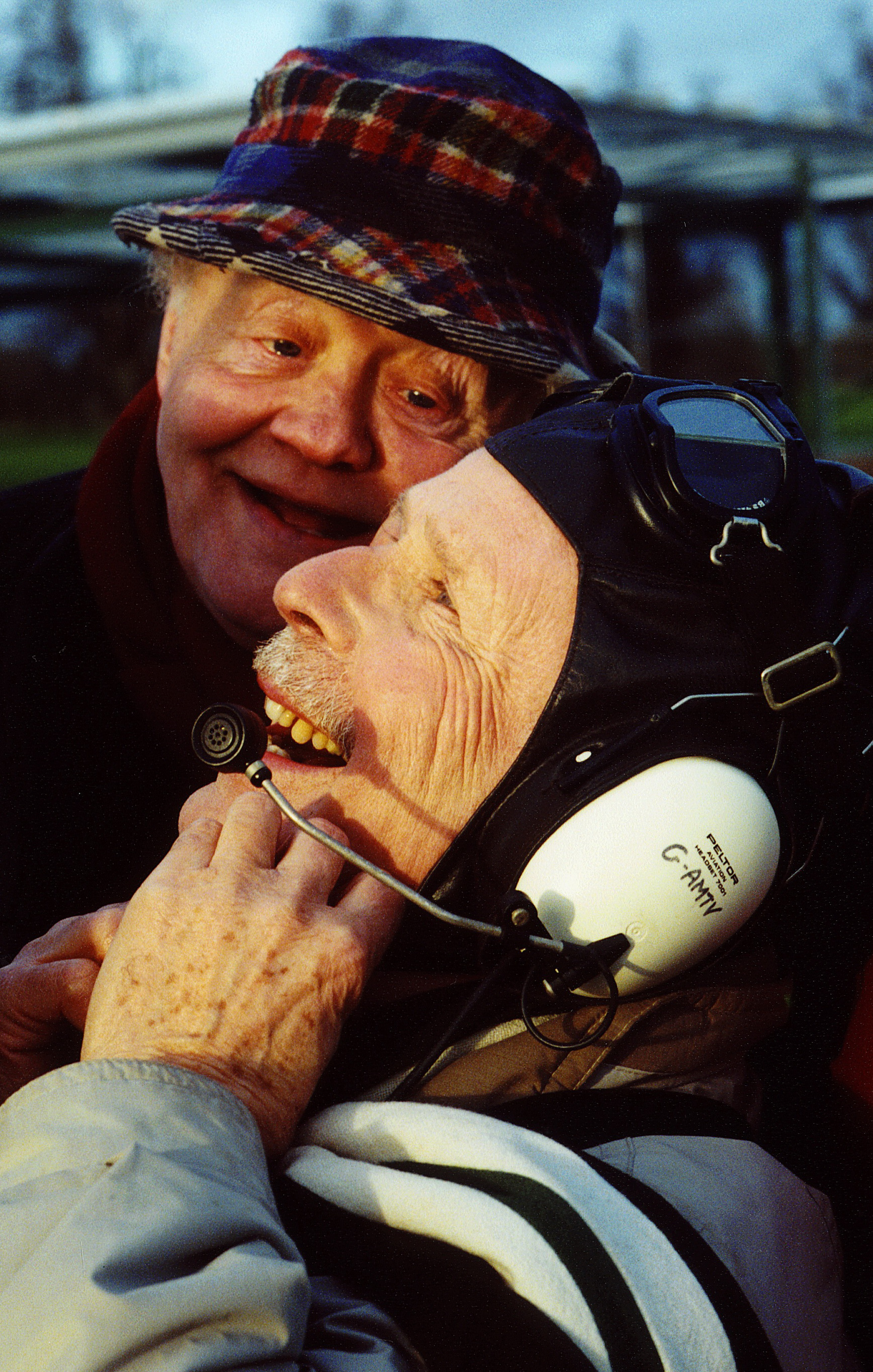
Dudley Sutton with Edward Hardwicke in The Goodbye Plane in 2003

In 1999, he appeared in the BBC Radio play Cosmos the Mystic Dog. In 2003, Sutton starred opposite Edward Hardwicke in David Bartlett's film The Goodbye Plane, and in 2004, he made an appearance in the soap opera EastEnders for sixteen episodes, playing Wilfred Atkins, a conman.

In 2003, Sutton found inspiration from the internet "where apparently people say that every time you masturbate God kills a kitten." From that statement, he developed a comic piece about "a young man's emotions and feelings, from the moment he's a baby tugging at his cock onwards." In August 2003, he performed the one-man Killing Kittens show at Edinburgh's Underbelly.

Sutton followed up Killing Kittens with a second autobiographical show Pandora's Lunchbox in 2006. Following a performance as William Blake in Peter Ackroyd's BBC television series The Romantics, Sutton joined the cast of Albion Rising at St Giles in the Fields Church, London, in April 2007. He reprised the role in the film of the same name in 2009.

Sutton had a small role in the British teenage drama Skins as Freddie's granddad. He also appeared in the episode of Holby City broadcast on 15 March 2011 as a patient who fell down an escalator in a shopping centre. In 2012, he featured in the video "Once And For All" by Clock Opera.

Sutton also appeared in episode three of the BBC comedy series Family Tree ("The Austerity Games"), which was first broadcast in July 2013, and was a guest star in episode three of the BBC series Boomers in 2014. He played William Makepeace in Emmerdale in 2014.

In 2015 he appeared as a Roman Catholic rector in the BBC TV series Father Brown episode 3.6 "The Upcott Fraternity". He also appeared in two episodes of the BBC's day time show, Doctors, in August 2015. He narrated the 2016 documentary The Future of Work and Death. In November 2017 he played the lead role in a video for the Tom Chaplin song "Midnight Mass".

== Personal life ==
He married American actress Marjorie Steele in 1961. She had previously been married to the millionaire producer Huntington Hartford. Sutton and Steele had one child together, but divorced in 1965. He had two more children.

Sutton told film maker Simon Sheridan that he was bisexual and that he had a sexual relationship with Dirk Bogarde.

== Death ==
Sutton died of cancer on 15 September 2018 at the age of 85.

== Filmography ==
- A Night to Remember (1958) – lookout (uncredited)
- Go to Blazes (1962) – boy lover
- The Boys (1962) – Stan Coulter
- The Leather Boys (1964) – Pete
- The Human Jungle (1964, TV Series) - "Ring of Hate" episode - Leigh Garner
- The Saint (1964, S3E4: "The Scorpion") – Eddy
- Rotten to the Core (1965) – Jelly
- Crossplot (1969) – Warren
- The Walking Stick (1970) – Ted Sandymount
- Randall and Hopkirk (Deceased) (1970, S1E18: "Could You Recognise The Man Again?") – Mort Roden
- One More Time (1970) – Wilson
- A Town Called Bastard (1971) – Spectre
- The Devils (1971) – Baron De Laubardemont
- Family Life (1971) – Ambulance man (uncredited)
- Mr. Forbush and the Penguins (1971) – Starshot
- Madame Sin (1972) – Monk
- Diamonds on Wheels (1973, TV Movie) – Finch
- Paganini Strikes Again (1973) – Raddings
- The Stud (1974, by Wilbur Stark) – Randy Warpshot / Longstreet / Charlady / Yidnar Warpshot / Newsboy
- The Sweeney (1975) – Golden Boy / Max Deller
- Porridge (1976, TV Series) - "The Desperate Hours" episode - Reg Urwin
- Pure as a Lily (1976) – Jack
- Fellini's Casanova (1976) – Duke of Wuertemberg
- The Pink Panther Strikes Again (1976) – Hugh McClaren
- The Glitterball (1977) - (uncredited)
- The Prince and the Pauper (1977) – Hodge
- Valentino (1977) – Willie Coleus
- No. 1 of the Secret Service (1977) – K.R.A.S.H. Leader
- The Big Sleep (1978) – Lanny
- The Playbirds (1978) – Hern
- The London Connection (1979) – Goetz
- The Island (1980) – Dr. Brazil
- George and Mildred (1980) – Jacko
- Brimstone and Treacle (1982) – Stroller
- Smiley’s People (1982, TV Mini-Series) - Oleg Kirov
- Widows (1983, TV Mini-Series) - Boxer Davis
- Those Glory Glory Days (1983, TV Movie) – Arthur – Journalist
- Lamb (1985) – Haddock
- Lovejoy (TV Series 1986–1994) – Tinker Dill
- A State of Emergency (1986) – Soviet professor
- The Rainbow (1989) – MacAllister
- Edward II (1991) – Bishop of Winchester
- Orlando (1992) – King James I
- Incognito (1998) – Halifax / Offul
- The Tichborne Claimant (1998) – Onslow Onslow
- Up at the Villa (2000) – Harold Atkinson
- David Copperfield (2000, TV Movie) - Mr Dick
- This Filthy Earth (2001) – Papa
- Tomorrow La Scala! (2002) – Dennis
- The Goodbye Plane (2003) - Harry
- Song for a Raggy Boy (2003) – Brother Tom
- The Football Factory (2004) – Bill Farrell
- EastEnders (2004) – Wilfred Atkins
- Irish Jam (2006) – Pat Duffy
- Dean Spanley (2008) – Marriot
- Sezon tumanov (2009) – Darby
- Albion Rising (2009) – William Blake
- Skins (2010, TV Series) – Norman McClair
- The Shouting Men (2010) – Charlie
- Weekend Retreat (2011) – Paulie
- Billy the Kid (2011) – Billy
- Outside Bet (2011) – Alfie Hobnails
- Cockneys vs Zombies (2012) – Eric
- Katherine of Alexandria (2014) – Marcellus
- Tin (2015) – Zachariah Bennett
- Father Brown (2015) - The Upcott Fraternity (episode 6, season 3) - Father Francis Palfreyman
- When the Devil Rides Out (2017) – George
- Steven Berkoff's Tell Tale Heart (2019) – Old Man
