= Kenny Baker (trumpeter) =

English jazz musician and composer (1921–1999)

Background information
- Born: Kenneth Baker; 1 March 1921; Withernsea, East Riding of Yorkshire, England
- Died: 7 December 1999 (aged 78) Felpham, West Sussex, England
- Occupations: Trumpeter composer
- Years active: 1941–1999

Kenneth Baker (1 March 1921 – 7 December 1999) was an English jazz trumpet, cornet and flugelhorn player, and a composer.

== Biography ==
Baker was born in Withernsea, East Riding of Yorkshire, England. He joined a brass band and by the age of 17 and had already become a professional musician. After leaving his home town of Withernsea, in Yorkshire's East Riding, for London, he met and began performing with the already well-known jazz musician George Chisholm. While serving in the Royal Air Force during the Second World War, Baker was called up to do forces programmes.

Baker was first heard on record in a British public jam session in 1941 and quickly established a strong reputation in London clubs. He was brass band trained and had faultless technical command. The young Baker was lead trumpeter with Ted Heath's post war orchestra, with "Bakerloo Non-Stop" recorded for the Decca record label in 1946. He played a tenor saxophone solo on "Johnny Gray", the piece recorded by both Baker and the drummer Jack Parnell. In the 1950s, Baker led his own group called Baker's Dozen for which he played lead and solos. With this group he performed on the first regular jazz show on British radio, the BBC Light Programme series Let's Settle For Music.

By the 1950s, he was regularly performing in studios with his numerous jazz recordings appearing as a quartet for Parlophone, and groups of all kinds for Nixa and others. In the 1960s and 1970s, he was still on call for film and studio work. He often appeared on BBC Radio's Sounds of Jazz programme introduced by Peter Clayton in the 1970s with recordings made at the Maida Vale Studios in London and broadcast late on Sunday evenings.

A notable appearance on soundtrack for Baker was a long hot trumpet solo mimed by Kay Kendall (who like Baker was a native of Withernsea, a small Yorkshire coastal town) in the 1954 film Genevieve. He regularly emerged to play at jazz clubs often with co-trumpeter John McLevey. Baker's skills brought him wider prominence, starting in 1955 when he appeared at Blackpool with the up-and-coming comic pair of Morecambe and Wise. He also went on to share top billings with other big comedy variety acts of the day, such as Tommy Trinder, Benny Hill and Ken Dodd. Appearing on the BBC's Big Band Special in 1962, leading British jazzman John Dankworth said, "Everybody regarded him on a different level to any other trumpeter in the British Isles. He was a world class performer."

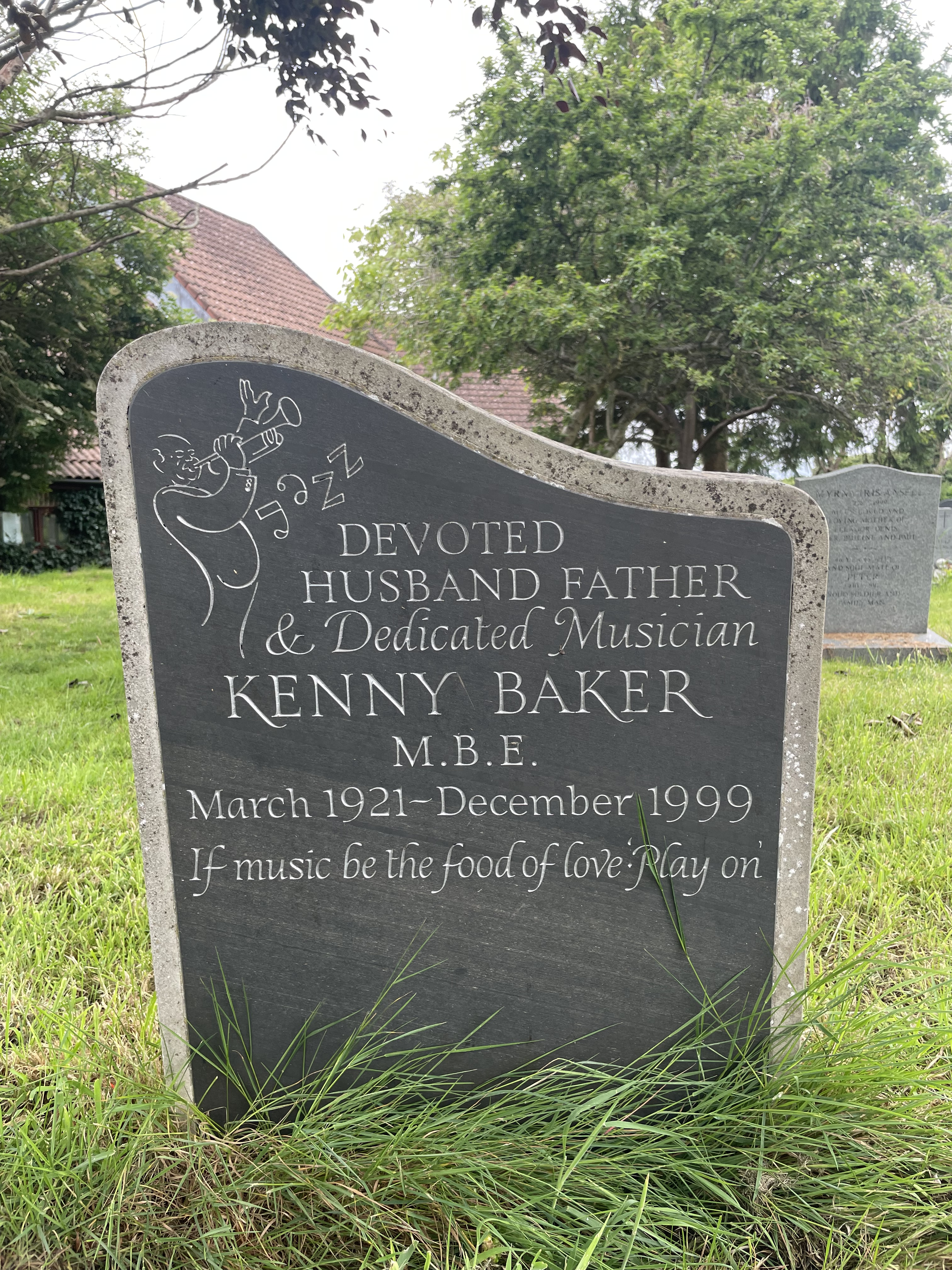
The gravestone of Kenny Baker in the churchyard of St. Mary the Virgin at Felpham, West Sussex, UK.

He formed the 'Best of British Jazz', which was a show with Don Lusher and Betty Smith. This group toured regularly in 1976 and after the death of Harry James in 1983, he was asked by the James Foundation to take over their orchestra; a request he declined.

His career saw him play with alongside Frank Sinatra, Petula Clark, Sammy Davis Jr. and Tony Bennett. He also performed on James Bond soundtracks and with The Beatles. In addition, he was also heard on hundreds of TV programmes including The Muppet Show, through his involvement with the Jack Parnell Orchestra, which played for the now-defunct ATV company.

In 1962, he recorded a light jazz set with Petula Clark at the Pye Studios at Great Cumberland Place, live and late at night with the Kenny Baker Trio. This has been re-issued on CD as In Other Words .. Petula Clark.

In the 1980s, he provided the music for The Beiderbecke Trilogy, starring James Bolam.

His group, Baker's Dozen, reformed in 1993 for four sell-out nights at Ronnie Scott's in Birmingham, releasing an album of the set on Big Bear Records, The Boss Is Home (1994).

He was presented with the best trumpet player title for the third time at the BT British Jazz Awards in 1999. He was also awarded the MBE in the Queen's Birthday Honours in 1999.

== Death ==
He died in a hospital close to his home at Felpham, West Sussex, at the age of 78 after suffering from a viral infection for more than three weeks. He is survived by his third wife Sue and daughter Julie.

Jim Simpson, head of Big Bear Records, said, "It's not just the passing of good man and a wonderful musician, it's the end of an era musically."
