= Chauncey Morehouse =

American drummer

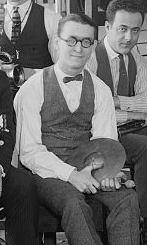
- Morehouse depicted as a member of Paul Specht's orchestra.

Background information
- Born: March 11, 1902; Niagara Falls, New York, U.S.
- Died: October 31, 1980 (aged 78); Medford, New Jersey, U.S.
- Genres: Jazz
- Occupation: Musician
- Instrument: Drums

Chauncey Morehouse (March 11, 1902 – October 31, 1980) was an American jazz drummer.

== Biography ==
Morehouse was born in Niagara Falls, New York, United States, and was raised in Chambersburg, Pennsylvania, where he played drums from a very early age. As a high schooler, he led a group called the Versatile Five. He landed a job with Paul Specht's orchestra from 1922 to 1924 (including a tour to England in 1923). He played with Jean Goldkette from 1925 to 1927, Adrian Rollini in 1927, and Don Voorhees in 1928–29. In the period 1927–29 he also recorded with Frankie Trumbauer, Bix Beiderbecke, Red Nichols, The Dorsey Brothers, and Joe Venuti.

From 1929 Morehouse was active chiefly as a studio musician, and in radio and television. In 1938, he assembled a percussion ensemble which played instruments that were designed by Morehouse and Stan King and that were tuned chromatically.

He invented a set of N'Goma drums – "14 chromatically tuned snare drums mounted on a circular bar" – around 1932. He worked in studios into the 1970s; in that decade he retired from studio work and began playing jazz again, including at festivals. He played at Carnegie Hall in 1975, with other former members of the Goldkette orchestra. Formerly a resident of the Vincentown section of Southampton Township, New Jersey, Morehouse died on October 31, 1980, at a nursing home in Medford, New Jersey, at the age of 78.
