= Alan Plater =

English playwright and screenwriter (1935–2010)

Alan Plater CBE FRSL
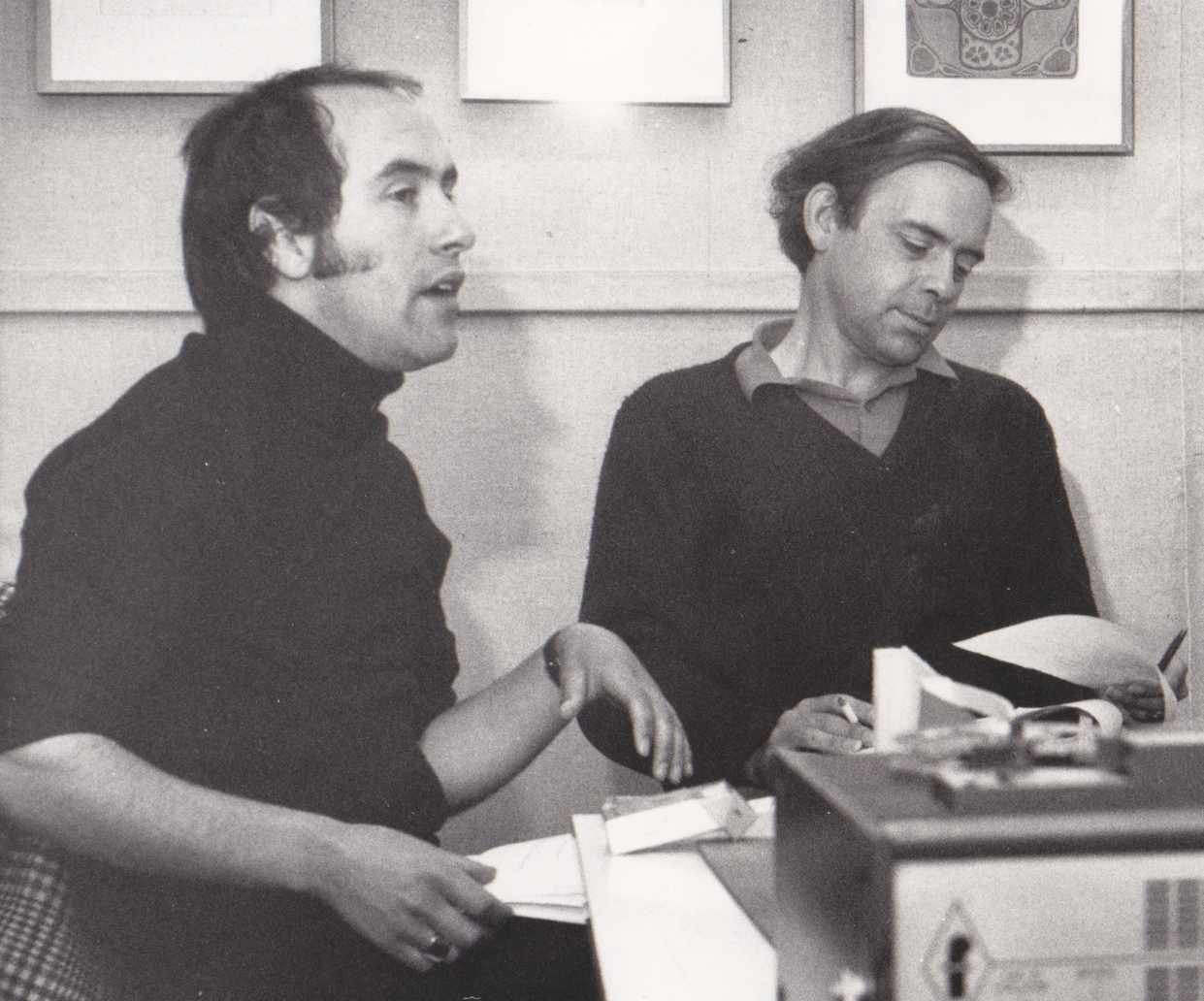
- Plater (right) with actor Malcolm Hebden in 1972
- Born: Alan Frederick Plater; 15 April 1935; Jarrow, England
- Died: 25 June 2010 (aged 75); London, England
- Occupation: Scriptwriter
- Spouse(s): Shirley Johnson (1958–1985); Shirley Rubinstein (1986–2010)
- Writing career
- Period: 1962–2010
- Genre: Television
- Notable works: Oh No It's Selwyn Froggitt (1976–1977); The Beiderbecke Trilogy (1985–1988); A Very British Coup (1988)

Alan Frederick Plater CBE FRSL (15 April 1935 – 25 June 2010) was an English playwright and screenwriter, who worked extensively in British television from the 1960s to the 2000s. He is best known for the sitcom Oh No It's Selwyn Froggitt and the comedy drama serials The Beiderbecke Trilogy. He also contributed to the BBC series Dalziel and Pascoe, and adapted Chris Mullin's novel A Very British Coup (1988) for television. He was the driving force behind the TV version of Flambards Among his few feature films were The Virgin and the Gypsy and Priest of Love.

Plater was president of the Writers' Guild of Great Britain from September 1991 until April 1995. In the Queen's New Year's Honours of 2005, he was created a Commander of the Order of the British Empire for services to drama.

== Early life ==
Plater was born in Jarrow, County Durham, although his family moved to Hull in 1938. Jarrow was much publicised as a severely economically depressed area before the Second World War – Plater joked that his family left Jarrow just after the Great Depression to catch Hull just before the Blitz. He attended Kingston High School.

He trained as an architect at King's College, Newcastle (later the Newcastle University School of Architecture, Planning and Landscape), but only practised in the profession for three years, at a junior level. He later stated that it was shortly after he was forced to fend off a herd of pigs from eating his tape measure while he was surveying a field that he left to pursue writing full-time.

== Career ==
Plater stayed in the north of England for many years after he became prominent as a writer and lived in Hull.

He first made his mark as a scriptwriter for Z-Cars (1962–65), along with its spin-offs Softly, Softly (1966–69) and Softly, Softly: Task Force (1969–76). His subsequent credits include The Reluctant Juggler in the series The Edwardians (1972), Shoulder to Shoulder (1974), The Stars Look Down (1975), Trinity Tales (1975), Oh No It's Selwyn Froggitt, The Journal of Vasilije Bogdanovic, the musical Close the Coalhouse Door with songwriter Alex Glasgow from the writings of Sid Chaplin, Get Lost! (1981), On Your Way, Riley (1982), Fortunes of War (1987) an adaptation based on the novels of Olivia Manning, The Beiderbecke Trilogy (1985–1988), Misterioso (an adaptation of his novel, 1991), Tales of Sherwood Forest (1989), Oliver's Travels (1995), an adaptation of J. B. Priestley's The Good Companions (1980) for Yorkshire Television, a film adaptation of George Orwell's Keep the Aspidistra Flying, Belonging and the theatre play Peggy for You, based on the life of Plater's former agent Peggy Ramsay, which was nominated in 2001 for a Laurence Olivier Theatre Award.

He also contributed to the BBC series Dalziel and Pascoe, and adapted Chris Mullin's novel A Very British Coup (1988) for television. He was the driving force behind the TV version of Flambards, which under his influence was claimed to be slanted well to the political left of K. M. Peyton's original books. Jazz is a recurring motif through much of Plater's work, often referenced explicitly as well as underpinning his story structures. Among his few feature films he collaborated twice with Christopher Miles on two successful D. H. Lawrence projects The Virgin and the Gypsy and Priest of Love.

His play Confessions of a City Supporter on his lifelong relationship with the Hull City A.F.C. was staged during the first-ever run of performances at the new home of the Hull Truck Theatre Company.

Plater was also president of the Writers' Guild of Great Britain from September 1991 until April 1995.

== Awards and honours ==
Plater received honorary degrees from the University of Hull and Northumbria University in Newcastle.

In the Queen's New Year's Honours of 2005, Plater was created a Commander of the Order of the British Empire for services to drama. He is also commemorated with a green plaque on The Avenues, Kingston upon Hull.

== Personal life and death ==
Plater was married to Shirley Johnson from 1958 to 1985, with whom he had two sons and a daughter, and later Shirley Rubinstein from 1986 gaining three stepsons.

Plater died of cancer at a London hospice, aged 75. His death was announced on 25 June 2010.
