= The Dark Side of the Sun (British serial) =

- Genre: Drama
- Created by: Michael J. Bird
- Directed by: David Askey
- Starring: Peter Egan; Emily Richard; Christopher Scoular; Betty Arvaniti; Patrick Mower
- Theme music composer: Stavros Xarhakos
- No. of series: 1
- No. of episodes: 6

Production
- Producer: Vere Lorrimer
- Production location: Rhodes

Original release
- Network: BBC1
- Release: 13 September – 18 October 1983

The Dark Side of the Sun is a six-part television serial written by Michael J. Bird and produced by the BBC in 1983.

== Premise ==
The Dark Side of the Sun takes place on the Greek island of Rhodes. The story combines elements of supernatural Gothic romance with the contemporary conspiracy thriller. There are themes of telepathy and hypnosis, and a secret society, descended from the Knights Templar, holding clandestine meetings on the island.

The historical back-story is linked to the suppression of the Templars, and seems also loosely inspired by the overthrow of Foulques de Villaret, 25th Grand Master of the Knights Hospitaller. His former stronghold at Lindos was one of the main filming locations. The Templar conspiracy theory element in the modern plot-line shows some influences from The Holy Blood and the Holy Grail, which had been published the previous year.

== Critical reaction ==
Writing in The Guardian, television critic Nancy Banks-Smith said "I don't understand any of it". Writing in The Times, critic Dennis Hackett stated he enjoyed the scenery and special effects but was less impressed by the rest.

== Main cast ==
- Peter Egan as Raoul Lavallière
- Patrick Mower as Don Tierney
- Emily Richard as Anne Tierney
- Betty Arvaniti as Ismini Christoyannis
- Christopher Scoular as David Bascombe
- Godfrey James as Harry Brennan
- Michael Sheard as Colonel von Reitz
- Mark Barratt as Max
- Brian Attree as Simon

== Crew ==
- Series written by: Michael J. Bird
- Directed by: David Askey
- Produced by: Vere Lorrimer
- Designed by: Alex Gourlay
- Theme music composed by: Stavros Xarhakos

== Episodes ==
| No. | Title | Original release date | Cast notes |
|---|---|---|---|
| 1 | "Into the Shadows" | 13 September 1983 | Steve Plytas (Nikolaidis); Dimitri Andreas (Andreas Seferis); Michael Chesden (Major Lambrinos); Peter Whitaker (Sir Joseph Marcus); Ray Marioni (Manzini); Willy Bowman (Niedermann); Kenneth Kendall (Newsreader); Andrew Bradford (Thief) |
| 2 | "A Time Out of Mind" | 20 September 1983 | Trevor Baxter (Dr. Phillimore); Steve Plytas (Nikolaidis); Dimitri Andreas (Andreas Seferis) |
| 3 | "No Stranger by Night" | 27 September 1983 | Alkis Kritikos (Museum Curator) |
| 4 | "The Face of Asmodeus" | 4 October 1983 | Alkis Kritikos (Museum Curator); Victor Baring (Voice) |
| 5 | "The Summoning" | 11 October 1983 | Pat Terry (Maid) |
| 6 | "Harvest of Fear" | 18 October 1983 | Trevor Baxter (Dr. Phillimore); Peter Whitaker (Sir Joseph Marcus); Ray Marioni (Manzini); Willy Bowman (Niedermann); Morris Perry (Wilhelm Ruiter); John Breslin (Estate Agent) |

== Production ==
The serial was the last in an unofficial quartet of serials written by Bird and set in the Mediterranean. The previous three were The Lotus Eaters, Who Pays the Ferryman? and The Aphrodite Inheritance.

The program's music was composed Stavros Xarchakos.
