= Quiller (TV series) =

1975 British TV drama series

- Genre: Spy; Adventure; Drama
- Starring: Michael Jayston; Moray Watson; Sinéad Cusack
- Country of origin: United Kingdom
- Original language: English
- No. of series: 1
- No. of episodes: 13

Production
- Producer: Peter Graham Scott
- Running time: 50 minutes

Original release
- Network: BBC One
- Release: 29 August – 28 November 1975

Quiller is a British drama television series starring Michael Jayston. The series premièred with the episode The Price of Violence on 29 August 1975 on BBC One. Quiller is the alias of a fictional spy created by English novelist Elleston Trevor who featured in a series of Cold War thrillers written under the pseudonym "Adam Hall".

The second episode's script - Tango Briefing - was written by "Adam Hall", adapted from his own novel of the same name. All the other episodes were written for the series.

Although all episodes survived destruction, the series has never been repeated on the BBC or other channels since its original transmission nor is it currently available online, on Blu-ray or DVD but in 2022 surfaced on YouTube and Telegram.

== Background ==
Quiller (Michael Jayston) works for a British secret organisation known simply as "The Bureau". This organisation dispatches Quiller on various missions across the globe to retrieve missing documentation, prevent secrets from falling into the hands of the enemy, rescue "sleepers", safely repatriate defecting agents or eliminate those whom Her Majesty's Government wishes to disappear. His controller at "The Bureau" is Angus Kinloch (Moray Watson) and the only other series regular is Rosalind (Sinéad Cusack).

== Production ==
The series adhered to the typical format of BBC dramas from that era, using 16mm film for outdoor locations and studio videotape for interior scenes. Notably, many episodes included foreign location shoots, with Malta (doubling for various countries) and Germany among the settings. Additionally, the production made extensive use of library stock footage, which was uncommon for BBC dramas.

== Cast ==
- Michael Jayston as Quiller (13 episodes)
- Moray Watson as Angus Kinloch (13 episodes)
- Sinéad Cusack as Rosalind (3 episodes)
- Nigel Stock (2 episodes)
- Prunella Gee (2 episodes)
- Lon Satton (2 episodes)
- Reg Lye as Chirac (1 episode)

== Series 1 ==
=== Episodes ===
| Episode # | Original air date (UK) | Episode title | Writer | Director | Plot | Guest cast |
|---|---|---|---|---|---|---|
| 1 | 29 August 1975 | "The Price of Violence" | Michael J. Bird | Peter Graham Scott | An assassin is on the loose in London and "The Bureau" instruct Quiller to protect an important international visitor. | Sinéad Cusack, Ed Bishop, Marc Zuber, Peter Tuddenham, Judy Liebert, Peter Woods, Nicholas Kane and Jay Neill. |
| 2 | 5 September 1975 | "Tango Briefing" | Adam Hall | David Sullivan Proudfoot | Quiller has to find and destroy the cargo on an aircraft that's crashed in the Sahara. | Nigel Stock, Prunella Gee, Paul Angelis and Reg Lye. |
| 3 | 12 September 1975 | "Any Last Request" | Brian Clemens | Michael Ferguson | When a British citizen is sentenced to be shot, Quiller has to get the man out but make it look like an execution still happens. | Edward Judd, Sheila Brennan, Ronald Lacey, Brian Glover, Moira Foot, Louis Mahoney, Michael Horsbrugh, Marc Boyle, Carlos Douglas, Jean Rimmer, Aleksander Browne and Alistair Meldrum. |
| 4 | 19 September 1975 | "Sacrifice to Survival" | Roger Parkes | Michael Ferguson | Quiller has to find a kidnapped women before it leads to all-out-war. | Nigel Stock, T. P. McKenna, Isla Blair, Oscar James, Ram John Holder, Willie Jonah and Alix Kirsta. |
| 5 | 3 October 1975 | "Assault on the Ritz" | David Weir | John Frankau | Quiller ends up as a mercenary on a one-way expedition. | Richard Johnson, Prunella Gee, Keith Barron, John Savident, Donald Sumpter, Mohammed Shamsi and Jeffrey Celebi. |
| 6 | 10 October 1975 | "Objective Caribbean" | Morris Fahri | Michael Ferguson | Can voodoo help seize power? Quiller investigates | Valerie Murray, Stefan Kalipha, Clifton Jones, Lon Satton, Tommy Eytle, Meredith Edwards, Colin McCormack, Allister Bain, Mark Heath, Clarence Miller, Bruce Callender, Frank Singuineau, Roy Stewart, Sam Mansaray and James Fuller. |
| 7 | 17 October 1975 | "Target North" | Anthony Masters | Viktors Ritelis | Quiller gets sent to learn how a strange explosion killed a government minister skiing. | Sinead Cusack, Bill Simpson, John Lee, Kurt Christian, James Cosmo, Robert Coleby and Joe Dunlop. |
| 8 | 24 October 1975 | "The Thin Red Line" | Brian Clemens | David Sullivan Proudfoot | Quiller investigates a rather peculiar "members-only club". | John Phillips, Peter Jeffrey, Christopher Neame, Esmond Knight, Richard Warwick, Peter Graves, Caroline Harris, Norma West, John Blythe, Nick Brimble, John Kelland, Michael Bangerter, Jean Rimmer and John Berwyn. |
| 9 | 31 October 1975 | "Political jungle" | Ivan Graham | Raymond Menmuir | When Quiller attempts to rescue a political prisoner he's somewhat bemused by the prisoner's wishes to remain incarcerated. | Gemma Jones, James Laurenson, Peter Cartwright, Ahmed Khalil, John Baskcomb, Alec Wallis, Denis De Marne and Al Garcia. |
| 10 | 7 November 1975 | "Mark the File Expendable" | Nick McCarty | Gerald Blake | When secret weapons are stolen from a British base in the Mediterranean, Quiller is sent to find out where they are. | Patrick Magee, Celia Gregory, Michael Latimer, Steve Plytas, Michael Wynne and Terry Walsh |
| 11 | 14 November 1975 | "Safe Conduct" | Michael J Bird | Gerald Blake | When a British defector wishes to leave his adopted country, Quiller's plans quickly unravel. | George Cole, Oscar Homolka, Stefan Gryff, Gerald Sim, George Mikell, Jan Conrad, Stephen Hubay, John Watts, Robin Sachs, Louis Hantz and Pamela Lintern. |
| 12 | 21 November 1975 | "Thundersky" | Brian Clemens | Raymond Menmuir | Whilst searching for a missing US Army Colonel, Quiller discovers a plan that could literally change the way London looks. | Lee Montague, Lon Satton, Paul Maxwell, James Berwick, Lalla Ward, Bob Sherman, Ray Jewers, Shane Rimmer, John Rhys-Davies, Frances Pidgeon and George Baizley. |
| 13 | 28 November 1975 | "Night of the Father" | Anthony Read | Viktors Ritelis | The Bureau loses an agent and a letter arrives from a dead man. Quiller finds himself in Munich to make the connection. | Peter Arne, Sinéad Cusack, Carl Duering, Margo Field, Julian Glover, Patricia Hodge, Jim Norton and Jack McKenzie. |
