= The Lotus Eaters (TV series) =

- Opening titles
- Genre: Drama
- Created by: Michael J. Bird
- Directed by: Cyril Coke; Douglas Camfield; David Cunliffe; Viktors Ritelis
- Starring: Ian Hendry; Wanda Ventham; Stefan Gryff; Thorley Walters; Maurice Denham; Sylvia Coleridge
- No. of series: 2
- No. of episodes: 15

Production
- Producers: Anthony Read (season 1); Michael Glynn (season 2)
- Production location: Aghios Nikolaos, Crete

Original release
- Network: BBC2
- Release: 23 April 1972 – 12 August 1973

Related
- Who Pays the Ferryman?

The Lotus Eaters is a BBC television drama first broadcast in 1972 and 1973.

The series, created by Michael J. Bird, deals with the lives of British expatriates living on the island of Crete, and their reasons for being there.

== Plot ==
The central characters are a married couple, Erik (Ian Hendry) and Ann Shepherd (Wanda Ventham), who run a tavern called Shepherd's Bar.

Ann is revealed in the first episode to be a sleeper agent of British Intelligence, Erik having been a broken-down drunk whom she was made to marry as part of her cover story. Other episodes deal with the other expatriates who frequented the bar. The most intriguing character in both series is the Greek police captain, Michael Krasakis (Stefan Gryff). In the second series the British Intelligence aspect is developed, until a clash with Soviet and Chinese agents results in both Ann and Erik having to leave Crete. In the final scene, about to board a plane leaving Heraklion airport, they have a partial reconciliation, since each is the only person the other can trust.

== Cast ==
=== Main ===
- Ian Hendry as Erik Shepherd
- Wanda Ventham as Ann Shepherd
- Maurice Denham as Nestor Turton
- Stefan Gryff as Captain Michael Krasakis
- Anthony Stamboulieh as Nikos

=== Recurring cast (season 1 only) ===
- James Kerry as Donald Culley (eps. 1, 3, 8–9)
- Thorley Walters as Major Edward Woolley (eps. 1–4)
- Sylvia Coleridge as Miriam Woolley (eps. 1–4)
- Julia Goodman as Kirsten McLuhan (eps. 1–2, 4–5, 7, 9)
- Martin Howells as Mark Potter (eps. 1–2, 4–5, 7, 9)
- Karan David as Katerina (eps. 1–6, 8–9)
- Carol Cleveland as Leigh Mervish (eps. 1–4, 7)
- Karl Held as Philip "Pip" Mervish (eps. 1–4, 7)

=== Recurring cast (season 2 only) ===
- Timothy Carlton as Gerard Mace
- John Horsley as Sir Hugh Russell (eps. 2–4)
- Paul Maxwell as Sam Webber (eps. 2–6)
- Susan Engel as Imogen Lundqvist (eps. 2–6)
- Frank Duncan as Cotton
- Godfrey James as Nicholson
- Ronald Howard as Dr John Dartington (eps. 2–6)
- Calliope Petrohilos as Ariadne Mazonaki (eps. 2–6)

== Production ==
Location scenes in The Lotus Eaters were filmed in the Cretan resort of Aghios Nikolaos and derived its title from the lotus-eaters of Greek mythology, where those who ate the fruit of the lotus tree lost the desire to return home.

Ann Shepherd was originally meant to be played by Hendry's then-wife Janet Munro, but their marriage ended and she withdrew.

The series was the first of the Mediterranean-based dramas written by Michael J. Bird for the BBC. The others included Who Pays the Ferryman?, also set in Crete; The Aphrodite Inheritance, set in Cyprus; and The Dark Side of the Sun, set in Rhodes.

The series' theme is "Ta Trena Pou Fyghan" (Τα Τραίνα Που Φύγαν" = "The Trains That Departed), from the album Hellespont, composed by Stavros Xarchakos.

== Episode details ==
Series 1

•	1–1 Cold Wind from the North	(23 Apr 1972)
	To eat the fruit of the lotus is to lose the desire to return home. But everyone who does has a reason.	
	Writer / Creator	Michael J. Bird
	Associate Producer	Michael Glynn
	Director	Cyril Coke
	Studio lighting	Nigel Wright
	Studio sound	Gordon Mackie
	Designer	Colin Shaw
	Producer	Anthony Read
	Erik Shepherd	Ian Hendry
	Nikos	Anthony Stamboulieh
	Katerina	Karan David
	Franz Zimmermann	John G. Heller
	Ann Shepherd	Wanda Ventham
	Donald Culley	James Kerry
	Ruth Stewart	Cyd Hayman
	Leigh Mervish	Carol Cleveland
	Philip Mervish	Karl Held
	Kirsten McLuhan	Julia Goodman
	Mark Potter	Martin Howells
	Major Woolley	Thorley Walters
	Mrs Woolley	Sylvia Coleridge
	Nestor Turton	Maurice Denham
	Vassilakis	Michael Zorba
	First boy	Ziggy Byfield
	Second boy	Charles Marriott
	Girl	Alison Griffin
	Policeman	Antonio Di Maggio
	Controller	Frank Duncan
	Instructor	Milos Kirek

•	1–2 The Present Mrs Clive	(30 Apr 1972)
	"I don't want to hurt her, but she's got to be made to realise that our marriage is dead." It sounds simple, but Lorna Clive has other ideas.	
	Writer / Creator	Michael J. Bird
	Producer	Michael Glynn
	Director	Douglas Camfield
	Costumes	Judy Allen
	Make-up	Jacquie Jefferies
	Designer	Michael Young
	Producer	Anthony Read
	Erik Shepherd	Ian Hendry
	Ann Shepherd	Wanda Ventham
	Katerina	Karan David
	Major Woolley	Thorley Walters
	Mrs Woolley	Sylvia Coleridge
	David Clive	Michael McStay
	Jennifer Neal	Susan Tebbs
	Nikos	Anthony Stamboulieh
	Captain Krasakis	Stefan Gryff
	Mark Potter	Martin Howells
	Kirsten McLuhan	Julia Goodman
	Nestor Turton	Maurice Denham
	Lorna Clive	Ann Firbank
	Philip Mervish	Karl Held
	Leigh Mervish	Carol Cleveland

•	1–3 And Hera Had a Sister	(7 May 1972)
	Storm clouds gather over Aghios Nikolaos as Erik Shepherd and his customers await a stranger. "We are all so vulnerable," says Captain Krasakis. "Conscience is every man's cross, as shame is his crown of thorns."	
	Writer / Creator	Michael J. Bird
	Producer	Michael Glynn
	Director	Douglas Camfield
	Designer	Michael Young
	Producer	Anthony Read
	Erik Shepherd	Ian Hendry
	Ann Shepherd	Wanda Ventham
	Katerina; Carol Sadler	Karan David
	Nikos	Anthony Stamboulieh
	Postman	Andrew Andreas
	Clerk of the Court	Neville Barber
	Policeman	Clive Roger
	Major Woolley	Thorley Walters
	Mrs Woolley	Sylvia Coleridge
	Philip Mervish	Karl Held
	Leigh Mervish	Carol Cleveland
	Fisherman	John Eastham
	Nestor Turton	Maurice Denham
	Donald Culley	James Kerry
	Controller	Frank Duncan
	Captain Krasakis	Stefan Gryff
	Sheila Fleming	Pamela Roland
	Machin	Derek Ware

•	1–4 A Touch of Home	(14 May 1972)
	Major and Mrs Edward Woolley live a perfectly ordered existence on Crete. But when the calm routine is broken, their life explodes into a violent reaction.	
	Writer / Creator	Michael J. Bird
	Producer	Michael Glynn
	Director	Cyril Coke
	Designer	Michael Young
	Producer	Anthony Read
	Erik Shepherd	Ian Hendry
	Major Woolley	Thorley Walters
	Ann Shepherd	Wanda Ventham
	Nikos	Anthony Stamboulieh
	Mrs Woolley	Sylvia Coleridge
	Kirsten McLuhan	Julia Goodman
	Mark Potter	Martin Howells
	Katerina	Karan David
	Leigh Mervish	Carol Cleveland
	Philip Mervish	Karl Held
	Clerk	Andreas Markos
	Captain Krasakis	Stefan Gryff

•	1–5 Aphrodite	(22 May 1972)
	Like the goddess Aphrodite, Julie Johnson drifts into Aghios Nikolaos from the sea. And like Aphrodite she disrupts the lives of all she meets, particularly Ann and Erik Shepherd.	
	Creator	Michael J. Bird
	Writer	Jack Ronder
	Associate Producer	Michael Glynn
	Director	David Cunliffe
	Designer	Austin Ruddy
	Producer	Anthony Read
	Erik Shepherd	Ian Hendry
	Mark Potter	Martin Howells
	Kirsten McLuhan	Julia Goodman
	Ann Shepherd	Wanda Ventham
	Julie	Suzan Farmer
	Nikos	Anthony Stamboulieh
	Katerina	Karan David
	Nestor Turton	Maurice Denham
	Police Sergeant	Tony Boyd
	Captain Krasakis	Stefan Gryff
	Val	Ingrid Hafner
	Nat	Gary Waldhorn
	Policeman	Antonio Di Maggio

•	1–6 A Tiger in Bristol Street	(28 May 1972)
	When the past catches up with Nestor Turton the results are both catastrophic and hilarious. For Nestor, it seems, has been dead for several years ...	
	Creator	Michael J. Bird
	Writer	David Fisher
	Associate Producer	Michael Glynn
	Director	Cyril Coke
	Designer	Colin Shaw
	Producer	Anthony Read
	Erik Shepherd	Ian Hendry
	Jervis Duncan	Peter Woodthorpe
	Monica Turton	Alethea Charlton
	Nestor Turton	Maurice Denham
	American Husband	Peter Carlisle
	Nikos	Anthony Stamboulieh
	Katerina	Karan David
	Captain Krasakis	Stefan Gryff
	Controller	Frank Duncan
	Donald Culley	James Kerry

•	1–7 The Fascinating Couple	(4 Jun 1972)
	No Cretan will set foot on the deserted island of Spinalonga. But Philip and Leigh Mervish find the powerful atmosphere of this former leper colony perfect for a psychological experiment.	
	Creator	Michael J. Bird
	Writer	David Weir
	Associate Producer	Michael Glynn
	Director	David Cunliffe
	Producer	Anthony Read
	Erik Shepherd	Ian Hendry
	Mark Potter	Martin Howells
	Kirsten McLuhan	Julia Goodman
	Ann Shepherd	Wanda Ventham
	Philip Mervish	Karl Held
	Leigh Mervish	Carol Cleveland
	Nikos	Anthony Stamboulieh
	Nestor Turton	Maurice Denham

•	1–8 You Might Get Hurt, Jocasta	(11 Jun 1972)
	Two people return to Aghios Nikolaos. And the marriage of Erik and Ann Shepherd is strained to breaking point.	
	Creator	Michael J. Bird
	Writer	David Weir
	Associate Producer	Michael Glynn
	Director	Douglas Camfield
	Producer	Anthony Read
	Jocasta	Anouska Hempel
	Alan Fletcher	Griffith Jones
	Alexia	Thalia Kouri
	Erik Shepherd	Ian Hendry
	Katerina	Karan David
	Ann Shepherd	Wanda Ventham
	Donald Culley	James Kerry

•	1–9 The Climbing Wave	(18 Jun 1972)
	As the town celebrates the festival of St Nicholas, the story of Erik and Ann Shepherd reaches a shattering climax.	
	Creator / Writer	Michael J. Bird
	Designer	Colin Shaw
	Associate Producer	Michael Glynn
	Director	David Cunliffe
	Producer	Anthony Read
	Erik Shepherd	Ian Hendry
	Katerina	Karan David
	Nikos	Anthony Stamboulieh
	Ann Shepherd	Wanda Ventham
	Donald Culley	James Kerry
	Mark Potter	Martin Howells
	Nestor Turton	Maurice Denham
	Kirsten McLuhan	Julia Goodman
	Controller	Frank Duncan
	Captain Krasakis	Stefan Gryff

Series 2

•	2–1 There and Back by Candlelight	(8 Jul 1973)
	The first title in the new series which continues the story of Erik and Ann Shepherd. Will they return to Aghios Nikolaos and face up to the web of intrigue and mystery in which they find themselves so deeply involved?	
	Creator / Writer	Michael J. Bird
	Designer	Michael Young
	Associate Producer	Michael Glynn
	Director	Cyril Coke
	Nestor Turton	Maurice Denham
	Erik Shepherd	Ian Hendry
	Ann Shepherd	Wanda Ventham
	Nikos	Anthony Stamboulieh
	Captain Krasakis	Stefan Gryff
	Nicholson	Godfrey James
	Cotton	Frank Duncan
	Major Constantinos	John Savident
	Richards	Ian Fairbairn
	Gerald Mace	Timothy Carlton
	Doctor	Frederick Peisley

•	2–2 A Kind of Treason	(15 Jul 1973)
	The Shepherds are back in Aghios Nikolaos. Ann remembers fragments from the past ... a past about which Erik learns the truth.	
	Creator / Writer	Michael J. Bird
	Designer	Austin Ruddy
	Associate Producer	Michael Glynn
	Director	Viktors Ritelis
	Ann Shepherd	Wanda Ventham
	Erik Shepherd	Ian Hendry
	Gerald Mace	Timothy Carlton
	Nestor Turton	Maurice Denham
	Nicholson	Godfrey James
	Major Constantinos	John Savident
	Richards	Ian Fairbairn
	Captain Krasakis	Stefan Gryff
	Nikos	Anthony Stamboulieh
	Cotton	Frank Duncan
	Chief Supt Fowler	Antony Carrick
	Ariadne Mazonaki	Calliope Petrohilos
	Sam Webber	Paul Maxwell
	Imogen Lundqvist	Susan Engel
	Dr Dartington	Ronald Howard
	Sir Hugh Russell	John Horsley

•	2–3 A Very Long Spoon	(22 Jul 1973)
	"You see, the terrible thing about all this business is that you can no longer trust anyone," says Captain Krasakis. Erik Shepherd realises how true this is when Ann regains her memory.	
	Creator / Writer	Michael J. Bird
	Designer	Graham Oakley
	Associate Producer	Michael Glynn
	Director	Cyril Coke
	Ann Shepherd	Wanda Ventham
	Erik Shepherd	Ian Hendry
	Cotton	Frank Duncan
	Captain Krasakis	Stefan Gryff
	Imogen Lundqvist	Susan Engel
	Dr Dartington	Ronald Howard
	Nestor Turton	Maurice Denham
	Ariadne Mazonaki	Calliope Petrohilos
	Gerald Mace	Timothy Carlton
	Bar customer	Andreas Markos
	Sam Webber	Paul Maxwell
	Sir Hugh Russell	John Horsley
	Nicholson	Godfrey James

•	2–4 Beside a Crooked Stile	(29 Jul 1973)
	The tensions and pressures increase on the Shepherds, particularly when they lose a very close friend.	
	Creator / Writer	Michael J. Bird
	Designer	Michael Young
	Associate Producer	Michael Glynn
	Director	Viktors Ritelis
	Ariadne Mazonaki	Calliope Petrohilos
	Ann Shepherd	Wanda Ventham
	Erik Shepherd	Ian Hendry
	Nikos	Anthony Stamboulieh
	Cotton	Frank Duncan
	Sir Hugh Russell	John Horsley
	Nicholson	Godfrey James
	Gerald Mace	Timothy Carlton
	Nestor Turton	Maurice Denham
	Marukakis	Salvin Stewart
	Sam Webber	Paul Maxwell
	Captain Krasakis	Stefan Gryff
	Imogen Lundqvist	Susan Engel
	Dr Dartington	Ronald Howard

•	2–5 The Well Diggers	(5 Aug 1973)
	"When two people whisper together in a corner they're usually digging a well for a third one to fall into," Erik Shepherd tells Sam Webber.	
	Creator / Writer	Michael J. Bird
	Designer	Michael Young
	Associate Producer	Michael Glynn
	Director	Cyril Coke
	Ann Shepherd	Wanda Ventham
	Erik Shepherd	Ian Hendry
	Sam Webber	Paul Maxwell
	Cotton	Frank Duncan
	Nicholson	Godfrey James
	Gerald Mace	Timothy Carlton
	Ariadne Mazonaki	Calliope Petrohilos
	Captain Krasakis	Stefan Gryff
	Dr Dartington	Ronald Howard
	Imogen Lundqvist	Susan Engel

•	2–6 And If You Have Time, Lord	(12 Aug 1973)
	With true identities revealed, the Shepherds' marriage faces its biggest test ...	
	Creator / Writer	Michael J. Bird
	Designer	Michael Young
	Associate Producer	Michael Glynn
	Director	Viktors Ritelis
	Gerald Mace	Timothy Carlton
	Nicholson	Godfrey James
	Cotton	Frank Duncan
	Erik Shepherd	Ian Hendry
	Captain Krasakis	Stefan Gryff
	Ariadne Mazonaki	Calliope Petrohilos
	Imogen Lundqvist	Susan Engel
	Ann Shepherd	Wanda Ventham
	Dr Dartington	Ronald Howard
	Sam Webber	Paul Maxwell
	Nikos	Anthony Stamboulieh
