= Arthur Rowe =

Arthur Rowe may refer to:

- Arthur Rowe (footballer) (1906–1993), English footballer and manager
- Arthur Rowe (athlete) (1936–2003), English track and field athlete
- Arthur Rowe (screenwriter) (1923–1998), American screenwriter and television producer
