= A Matter of Conscience (film) =

1973 film

- Greek: Θέμα συνειδήσεως
- Directed by: Petros Lykas
- Written by: Stavros Tsiolis
- Starring: Nikos Kourkoulos; Betty Arvaniti; Zoras Tsapelis; Vasilis Andreopoulos; Louiza Podimata
- Music by: Mimis Plessas
- Distributed by: Finos Film
- Release date: March 12, 1973
- Running time: 189 minutes
- Country: Greece
- Language: Greek

A Matter of Conscience (Greek: Θέμα συνειδήσεως) is a 1973 Greek film produced by Finos Films, directed by Petros Lykas and starring Nikos Kourkoulos and Betty Arvaniti.

== Cast ==
- Nikos Kourkoulos ..... Geralis
- Betty Arvaniti ..... Sakellaropoulou
- Zoras Tsapelis ..... Emmanouil Hatzigiorgos
- Vasilis Andreopoulos
- Louiza Podimata ..... Maria
- Takis Christoforidis
- Periklis Christoforidis
- Timos Perlegas
