= Nikos Verlekis =

Greek actor and director

Nikos Verlekis (Νίκος Βερλέκης; born 20 January 1948) is a Greek actor and director. As an actor, his known for film roles that include A Lady at the Bouzoukia, Those who spoke with death, and Every dawn I die. He also appeared in British TV series Who Pays the Ferryman? and Anglo-Greek horror film The Devil's Men, known as Land of the Minotaur.

== Life ==
Nikos Verlekis was born in 1948 in Athamania, Arta. He has two brothers and one sister. His parents were both farmers and could not afford to send him to drama school, so when he graduated from high school he decided to go to Athens, get a job there and enroll at the Kostis Michailidis Drama School, one of the best drama schools back then, from which a lot of acclaimed actors had graduated. While he was studying drama there, he auditioned for a small role in a movie by Finos Film called “A lady at the bouzoukia.” His collaboration with Finos Film went on and played in other films by that film production company as well, such as “Those who spoke with death” and “Every dawn I die”. When he graduated from drama school, he collaborated with the “Karagiannis-Karatzopoulos” company and other independent producers and he played next to other acclaimed comedians and actors. At the same time, he was playing in plays by Greek and foreign authors. Some of those include “Ti 30, ti 40, ti 50,” “Agapi mou paliogria,” “Kare tou erota,” “Bizarre male,” “Volpone” by Ben Jonson, directed by Minos Volanakis, “The Mousetrap” by Agatha Christie, “Captain Michael” by Nikos Kazantzakis, etc.

In 1973, he stars in acclaimed series, such as: “Keklismenon ton thiron,” “The ship,” “The city,” by Spiros Plaskovitis, “O Patouchas,” by Ioannis Kondilakis, directed by Alexis Damianos, “Tis agapis machairia,” etc. The three last series mentioned, had a huge reception by the Greek TV audience. He has taken part in 30 TV series in total.

Leaving briefly his job in Greece, he went to England, where he takes part in English productions, such as Michael J. Bird's TV drama Who Pays the Ferryman? starring Jack Hedley, and others that have not been released in Greece. His British films included The Devil's Men (a.k.a. Minotaur) with Donald Pleasence and Peter Cushing.

== Personal life ==
In 1986, he gets married. He has two daughters and currently resides in Athens, Greece.

== Other work ==
While he is still working in theater and television, at the same time he is directing documentaries for the Greek TV channel, ERT. He has directed 45 documentaries so far. Furthermore, the last eight years, he has been dealing with local government and is deputy mayor of culture of Kesariani. He is also at the administrative council at the "House of the Actor" which is a charitable, cultural and non-profit institution which is under the auspices of the Ministry of Culture, the Ministry of Finance, the Ministry of Education and the Ministry of Health and helps, fosters and generally supports the poor, homeless and helpless artists.

== Film ==
- A lady at the bouzoukia (1968)
- Trial of an innocent (1969)
- The sacrifice of a woman (1969)
- Those who spoke with death (1970)
- The brothers swore vengeance (1970)
- Agapi mou paliogria (1972)
- The devils of the night (1972)
- Journey to love and death (1972) ..... Alexis Razis
- Ti 30... ti 40... ti 50 (1972) ..... Foivos
- Hotel of the corrupted (1972) ..... Alexis Nikolaou / Nikolas Anagnostou / Gerasimos
- Ton arapi ki an ton plenis to sapouni sou halas (1973) ..... Lelos
- Kolasmeni tou sex / Taste of white death (1974) ..... painter
- Erotismos kai pathos (1974) ..... car driver
- The metic (1975)
- The hunters (1977)
- Abnormal load (1977) ..... captain
- Thanasis's crazy world (1979)
- Flatlet for ten (1981) ..... Petros Mouratoglou
- A short guy will save us! (1981)
- Tis politsmanas to kangelo (1981) ...... Mike
- I will steal you, do you hear me? (1982) ..... Alexis
- Handsome as a Greek (1985)
- Mia Maria se timi efkerias (1985)
- TV cannibals (1987) ..... rebel / torturer
- The bluff (1987)
- Detective ya klamata (1988)
- Young, amazing and pretty (1988) ..... Alkis
- The ratter of the two continents (1988)
- Business in the Balkans (1996)
- I love Karditsa (2010) ..... Nicolas
- In the outburst of the moon (2010)

== Television ==
- Who pays the ferryman? (1977)
- From the opposite bank (1973)
- Ine stigmes (2012)
- The disappearance (2008)
- The verdict (1978)
- The shining (1991)
- The bluff (1992)
- The company (1982)
- The city (1991)
- Kalimera zoi (1993)
- Café Emigkrek (1986)
- Wax doll (1987)
- Monachous monachous (1988)
- Business in the Balkans (1999)
- Mirto (1990)
- O Patouchas (1984)
- The sound of silence (1993)
- I axiopisti (1982)
- The guardians of Achaia (1992)
- Behind the masks (1994)
- Full moon (1989)
- Parallel roads (1992)
- In the steps of hope (1976)
- Crucifixion without resurrection (1989)
- Stisihorou ’73 (1972)
- Tis agapis machairia (2006)
- Diary of a doorman (1979)
- The black key (1973)
- The first Christmas cake (1982)
- Seagull’s hovering (1997)
- Handsome as a Greek (1987)

== Additional references ==
- Anniversary album 1968-2008 of “Radiotelevision,” published by ERT in November 2008
- “Greek cinema: History, filmography, biographies,” by Aggelos Rouvas, Christos Stathakopoulos
- “Eighty years OGA: (Organization of Greek Actors,) theater and cinema,” Sbilios editions, 1917–1997
- “The Almanac of Greek Screen” by Vasilis Georgiadis
- www.actorhouse.gr
- greekactor.blogspot.gr “Greek actors and actresses”
