= Timos =

Timos (Greek: Τίμος) is a Greek male given name. Notable people with the name include:

- Timos Kavakas (born 1972), Greek footballer
- Timos Perlegas (1938–1993), Greek actor

== See also ==
- Timo
