= I charavgi tis nikis =

I charavgi tis nikis Η χαραυγή της νίκης
- Directed by: Dimis Dadiras
- Written by: Giorgos Lazaridis
- Starring: Lakis Komninos; Betty Arvaniti; Miranta Kounelaki; Nikos Dadinopoulos; Gikas Biniaris
- Distributed by: Damaskinos-Mihailidis
- Release date: 20 September 1971
- Running time: 100 minutes
- Country: Greece
- Language: Greek

The Dawn of Victory (Greek: Η χαραυγή της νίκης) is a 1971 Greek war film directed by Dimis Dadiras, written by Giorgos Lazaridis and starring Lakis Komninos, Betty Arvaniti and Miranta Kounelaki.

== Plot ==
In 1943, Allied forces stationed in the Middle East commission a team of commandos led by Nikitas (Nikos Dadinopoulos) to destroy the largest German military airport in occupied Crete. Nikitas is a Cretan himself and the son of a drunkard Nazi collaborator (Dimos Starenios). He is in love with Martha (Miranta Kounelaki), a local villager. The commandos seek the assistance of the resistance, led by Lefteris (Lakis Komninos), who is also in love with Martha. While initially willing to cooperate, Lefteris changes his mind and refuses to help the team in their operation, believing it to be a suicide mission. Without the help of the resistance, the commando's mission is a failure. Meanwhile, after the resistance blows up a bridge, the Germans arrest Martha and Lefteris' father in an attempt to force Lefteris to turn himself in. Lefteris refuses to surrender, but instead leads his fighters in an attack on the German headquarters, rescuing the captives.

== Cast ==
- Lakis Komninos ..... Lefteris Sifakas
- Betty Arvaniti ..... Chrysa
- Miranda Kounelaki ..... Martha Kalogeri
- Nikos Dadinopoulos ..... Nikitas Petrakis
- Gikas Biniaris ..... Minas Sifakas
- Ilya Livykou ..... Chrysanthi Petraki
- Giorgos Velentzas ..... Colonel Petridis
- Dimos Starenios ..... Frantzeskos Petrakis

== Production ==
The music was written by Kostas Kapnisis and Nikos Xylouris sings and plays the lyre in the Rizita song "When will the frost break".

The film was shot and released during the Greek military junta of 1967–74 and as such was subject to the strict censorship common at the time. Filming took place in and around Rethymno, in September and October 1970, including in the archeological site of the Fortezza castle, in the old city and the building of the Prefecture of Rethymno was used. The remainder of the film was filmed in Chania. Filming also took place in the Kourtaliotiko and Prasiano gorges, in the villages of Spili and Myloi, in the village of Maroulas and on the Nida plateau.

== Release ==
The movie was screened at the Thessaloniki Film Festival in 1971 (see 1971 Thessaloniki Film Festival), where it was met with fierce disapproval from the audience. The producer threatened to stop the screening if the heckling didn't stop, without success. Miranda Kounelaki nonetheless won Best Supporting Actress for her role in the film at the festival.

== Awards ==
- Best Supporting Actress Award (Miranda Kounelaki) at the 1971 Thessaloniki Film Festival

== Cultural references ==
The film is mainly remembered in Greece for a single line by Dimos Starenios' character, while he is urging the gathered villagers to cooperate with the surrounding German troops, asking for information about the resistance. The full quote is:

Don't you feel sorry for your families? They'll burn Crete. Whoever knows, talk. We have to catch the traitors. The Germans love us! They came here as friends! Whoever knows, talk.

After none of the villagers say anything and the priest steps forward and gives a rousing patriotic speech, the German troops fire on the crowd, massacring the gathered Cretans.

== See also ==
- List of Greek films
