= Carl Held =

American actor (born 1931)

- Born: September 19, 1931 (age 94); Jersey City, New Jersey, U.S.
- Occupation: Actor
- Years active: 1960–present
- Spouse(s): Sarah Marshall (m. 1964–2014; her death)

Carl Held (born September 19, 1931), sometimes credited as Karl Held and Christopher Held, is an American actor who has worked extensively in both American and British television.

== Career ==
Held is best known for his role as Garth in the 1980s soap opera Falcon Crest, which he played for three seasons from 1987 to 1989.

During the fourth season (1960–1961) of Perry Mason, Held appeared as Bruce Nesbitt in the episode "The Case of the Angry Dead Man". Later that season, he appeared as the defendant David Gideon in "The Case of the Grumbling Grandfather." He appeared as Gideon in eight more episodes in the fifth season (1961–1962) in a "legal eagle" aspiring law student role, assisting Perry in uncovering evidence to aid Mason's clients accused of murder.

Five months after the final space launch of Project Mercury in 1963, Held played a solo astronaut in "The Man Who Was Never Born", the sixth episode of The Outer Limits.

Other TV credits include 77 Sunset Strip, The Big Valley, The Girl from U.N.C.L.E., Flipper, The Fugitive, Daktari, Star Trek, The Invaders, Mission: Impossible, The Lotus Eaters, Space: 1999, Return of the Saint, The Aphrodite Inheritance, Thriller (1975), The Incredible Hulk, Charlie's Angels, Taxi, St. Elsewhere, MacGyver, Scarecrow and Mrs. King, Riptide, The Rebel and L.A. Law.

== Filmography ==
=== Film ===
Year	Title	Role	Notes
1961	The Outsider	Senator	
1964	Youngblood Hawke	Nephew	
1964	36 Hours	Corporal	
1965	That Darn Cat!	Kelton	
1967	The Gnome-Mobile	Paul	
1971	Diamonds Are Forever	Agent Mendez	
1972	Embassy	Ryland 1975 "Brannigan" Chicago policeman	
1977	Madame Claude	Stanfield	
1979	The Bitch	Coach Sanders	
2012	Bad Blood	Capt. Willis	

=== Television ===
Year	Title	Role	Notes
1960	The Law and Mr. Jones	Donald McGowan	Episode: "The Baby"
1961	Sea Hunt	USCG Radarman	Episode: "The Destroyers"
1961	The Barbara Stanwyck Show	Detective Jones	Episode: "Along the Barbary Coast"
1961	The Rebel	Danny Heathers	Episode: "The Found"
1961–1962	Perry Mason	David Gideon / Bruce Nesbitt	10 episodes
1962	Cain's Hundred	Emil Brower	Episode: "The Manipulator: Raymond Cruz"
1962, 1963	GE True	Patrolman John Egan / Capt. Hertzmann	Episodes: "V-Victor 5" / "Commando"
1963	The Gallant Men	Maj. Woelfel	Episode: "To Hold Up a Mirror"
1963	77 Sunset Strip	Gordon Vancott	Episode: "Nine to Five"
1963	The Dakotas	Emil Lang	Episode: "Justice at Eagle's Nest"
1963	Hawaiian Eye	Mr. Stanford	Episode: "Passport"
1963	The Outer Limits	Capt. Joseph Reardon	Episode: "The Man Who Was Never Born"
1964	Kraft Suspense Theatre	German Captain	Episode: "Operation Greif"
1964	Ready for the People	Dave Ryan	Television film
1965	Flipper	Alan Bentley	Episode: "Junior Ranger"
1965–1972	The F.B.I.	Various roles	3 episodes
1965	The Big Valley	Matt Cooper	Episode: "The Murdered Party"
1966	The Fugitive	Buddy	Episode: "The Chinese Sunset"
1966	Daktari	Holland	Episode: "The Hostages"
1966	Jericho	German Lieutenant	Episode: "Dutch and Go"
1967	The Girl from U.N.C.L.E.	Prince Efram	Episode: "The Drublegratz Affair"
1967	Star Trek: The Original Series	Lindstrom	Episode: "The Return of the Archons"
1967	The Magical World of Disney	Mr. Oppenheim	Episode: "Atta Girl, Kelly!: Love Is Blind"
1967	Cimarron Strip	Cox Houston	Episode: "The Beast That Walks Like a Man"
1967	The Invaders	Lieutenant	Episode: "The Ransom"
1968	Garrison's Gorillas	Major Reinhardt	Episode: "The Frame-Up"
1969	The Ugliest Girl in Town	Percy	Episode: "The Ugliest Boy in Town"
1969	Armchair Theatre	Eddy	Episode: "On Vacation"
1969	Strange Report	Drake	Episode: "Racist – A Most Dangerous Proposal"
1971	Brett	Tony Powers	Episode: "The Hollow Men"
1971	The Case of the Midwife Toad	G.K. Noble	Television film
1972	The Lotus Eaters	Philip Mervish	5 episodes
1972	Medical Center	Arthur Campbell	Episode: "Condemned"
1972	The Adventurer	Major	Episode: "Action!"
1975	You're on Your Own	Price	Episode: "Value for Money"
1975	Thriller	Security Guard	Episode: "Mirror of Deception"
1977	Space: 1999	Jerry Travis	Episode: "The Immunity Syndrome"
1978	The Incredible Hulk	Jonathan	Episode: "Terror in Times Square"
1978	A Family Upside Down	Al	Television film
1979	The Aphrodite Inheritance	Travis	8 episodes
1979	Robin's Nest	Fernando	Episode: "Lost Weekend"
1979	Return of the Saint	Shriber	Episode: "The Diplomat's Daughter"
1979	Charlie's Angels	Paul Kohler	Episode: "The Prince and the Angel"
1980	Eight Is Enough	Jerry	Episode: "Roll Over Bradford"
1981	The Bunker	Hans Baur	Television film
1982	The Jeffersons	Fred	Episode: "Lesson in Love"
1982	St. Elsewhere	Dr. Borovay	Episode: "Legionnaires: Part 2"
1984	Riptide	Brock Billings	Episode: "Beat the Box"
1984	Finder of Lost Loves	Henry	Episode: "Old Friends"
1985	Santa Barbara	Dr. Renfro	Episode #1.155
1986	MacGyver	Buyer #2 / Man #2	2 episodes
1986, 1987	Scarecrow and Mrs. King	Kleiner / Gunther Moss	2 episodes
1986–1989	Falcon Crest	Garth	46 episodes
1991	L.A. Law	West	Episode: "Good to the Last Drop"
2017	Me and My Grandma	Elderly Actor	Episode: "Elderboo"
2017	Spades	John	2 episodes
