= The Aphrodite Inheritance =

1979 British TV drama serial

- Genre: Drama
- Created by: Michael J. Bird
- Directed by: Terence Williams and Viktors Ritelis
- Starring: Peter McEnery; Alexandra Bastedo; Stefan Gryff; Paul Maxwell; Brian Blessed
- Theme music composer: George Kotsonis
- No. of series: 1
- No. of episodes: 8

Production
- Producer: Andrew Osborn
- Production location: Cyprus

Original release
- Network: BBC1
- Release: 3 January – 21 February 1979

The Aphrodite Inheritance is a BBC eight-part television series broadcast in 1979.

The eight-part serial, written by Michael J. Bird, followed his previous successful Mediterranean-set series The Lotus Eaters and Who Pays the Ferryman?. While the two previous productions had been set and filmed in Crete, the action (and location filming) in The Aphrodite Inheritance took place in Cyprus.

The series starred Peter McEnery as a man visiting Cyprus to investigate the death of his brother and subsequently being drawn into a strange conspiracy, with the narrative twists of the serial employing various supernatural and mythological motifs. Other major cast members included Alexandra Bastedo, Brian Blessed, Paul Maxwell and Stefan Gryff. The titles were created by Stefan Pstrowski.

== Credits ==
=== Main cast ===
- Peter McEnery as David Collier
- Alexandra Bastedo as Helene
- Stefan Gryff as Charalambos
- Paul Maxwell as Eugene Hellman
- Brian Blessed as Basileos
- Godfrey James as Inspector Dimas
- Tony Doyle as Martin Preece
- William Wilde as Eric Morrison
- Ray Jewers as Olsen
- Karl Held as Travis

=== Crew ===
- Series Created & Written by: Michael J. Bird
- Produced by: Andrew Osborn
- Directed by: Terence Williams (eps. 1-4) & Viktors Ritelis (eps. 5-8)
- Designed by: Jon Pusey
- Theme music composed by: George Kotsonis

== Episodes ==
Episode no.	Title	First transmission (UK)	Cast notes
1	"A Death in the Family"	3 January 1979	Barry Halliday (Barry Collier); Andreas Moustras (Doctor); Tom Watson (Wyndham); Theodoulos Moreas (Priest)
2	"A Lamb to Slaughter"	10 January 1979	Nicos Shiafkalis (Nicos)
3	"Here We Come Gathering"	17 January 1979	Nicholas Kaminous (Detective Sergeant); John Ioannou (Policeman)
4	"A Friend in Need"	24 January 1979	Carmen Gómez (Maria); Costas Demetriou (Antonis); Nicholas Kaminous (Detective Sergeant); John Ioannou (Policeman)
5	"Come Into My Parlour"	31 January 1979	Carmen Gomez (Maria); Costas Demetriou (Antonis); Barry Halliday (Barry Collier); Charlambos Xoufarides (Policeman)
6	"Said the Spider to the Fly"	7 February 1979	Carmen Gomez (Maria); Tom Watson (Wyndham); Nikias Nicolaides (Police Sergeant)
7	"The Eyes of Love"	14 February 1979	Georgios Zenios (Professor Stylianou)
8	"To Touch a Rainbow"	21 February 1979	Carmen Gomez (Maria); Georgios Zenios (Professor Stylianou)
