= Ooh... You Are Awful =

1972 British film by Cliff Owen

Ooh… You Are Awful
- Theatrical release poster
- Directed by: Cliff Owen
- Written by: John Warren; John Singer
- Produced by: E.M. Smedley-Aston; Sidney Gilliat; Frank Launder
- Starring: Dick Emery; Derren Nesbitt; Ronald Fraser; Cheryl Kennedy
- Cinematography: Ernest Steward
- Edited by: Bill Blunden
- Music by: Christopher Gunning
- Production company: British Lion Films
- Distributed by: British Lion Films
- Release date: 28 December 1972
- Running time: 97 minutes
- Country: United Kingdom
- Language: English
- Budget: £201,443
- Box office: £267,173

Ooh... You Are Awful (U.S. title: Get Charlie Tully) is a 1972 British comedy film directed by Cliff Owen and starring Dick Emery, Derren Nesbitt, Ronald Fraser and Cheryl Kennedy. It was written by John Warren and John Singer. It is a feature-length adaptation of The Dick Emery Show (BBC TV, 1963–1981). It was Emery's sole starring film.

== Plot ==
Conmen Charlie Tully and Reggie Peek have successfully conned a couple of Italian men, and are making an easy escape with £500,000. Flushed with success, Tully is unable to resist running a "quick and easy" con on a passing American tourist, but Tully is arrested. While Tully is imprisoned, Peek manages to escape and deposits the £500,000 in a Swiss bank account. Peek meets Tully on his release, intending to give him the bank account number. But Peek has been having an affair with the sister of London crime lord Sid Sabbath, and his reunion with Tully is cut short when Peek is murdered, on the orders of Sabbath.

Peek has left a record of the bank account number, tattooed on the bottoms of four young women. Tully adopts a range of disguises to track down each woman in turn to see her naked bottom.

Throughout, Tully is confronted by members of Sid Sabbath's gang, with orders to kill as only for them to mysteriously die themselves. Tully thinks he is "lucky", while Sabbath thinks Tully is a one-man army. Neither realise Tully is being secretly guarded by Italian gangsters.

== Cast ==
- Dick Emery as Charlie Tully
- Derren Nesbitt as Sid Sabbath
- Ronald Fraser as Reggie Campbell Peek
- Pat Coombs as Libby Niven
- William Franklyn as Arnold Van Cleef
- Cheryl Kennedy as Jo Mason
- Norman Bird as Warder Burke
- Roland Curram as Vivian
- Liza Goddard as Liza Missenden Green
- Ambrosine Phillpotts as Lady Missenden Green
- Brian Oulton as funeral director
- David Healy as tourist (as Dave Healey)
- Steve Plytas as Signor Vittorio Ferruchi
- Louis Negin as Emilio Ferruchi
- Neil Wilson as Attendant Price
- Henry Gilbert as Don Luigi
- Anthony Stamboulieh as Dino (as Antony Stamboulieh)
- Guido Adorni as Carlo
- Stefan Gryff as Capo Mafioso
- Louis Mansi as Mancini
- Frank Coda as Mafioso (as Frank Codo)
- Sheila Keith as Lady Magistrate
- Tucker McGuire as American woman
- Phil Brown as American man
- Joan Ingram as Woman in Art Gallery
- Julie Crosthwaite as Patsy
- Anna Gilchrist as Jane
- Margaret Courtenay as woman police officer
- Dinny Powell as Arthur (as Dinnie Powell)
- Larry Taylor as hood
- Burnell Tucker as second American tourist
- Reg Lye as bogus milkman

== Production ==
The National Film Finance Corporation invested £62,000 in the film. It was the first NFFC investment following the ending of their Government funding, with new finance obtained from a consortium of merchant banks. The NFFC decided to only make "safe" films, and Ooh... You Are Awful was the first of these.

Liza Goddard said that her nude scene in this film was a "horrible, embarrassing experience".

== Reception ==
The film made a profit.

The Monthly Film Bulletin wrote: "Often wasted on television, Dick Emery's considerable talent for comic impersonations is here woven into an entertaining plot which finds plausible excuses for him to don an assortment of disguises and appear in drag (as a bereaved mother, a blowsy woman police officer), as a diplomat, or as the familiar butler figure, Lampwick. Authors John Warren and John Singer have avoided the danger of fragmenting their story into a series of unrelated sketches; and though they don't invariably resist clichés (of character and situation), there is still much to enjoy. Cliff Owen's direction is imaginative; there is an engaging, if mild, element of black comedy (at one point Charlie nonchalantly flicks his cigarette ash into the urn containing Reggie's cremated remains); and although the film is essentially Emery's vehicle, there are some amusing cameos – most notably, Brian Oulton's consolatory funeral director and Stefan Gryff's Mafia boss"

The Observer called it "the best British comedy in many years."

Leslie Halliwell wrote: "Amusing star vehicle with plenty of room for impersonations and outrageous jokes."

The Radio Times Guide to Films gave the film 2/5 stars, writing: "This is a McGill seaside postcard come to boozy nudge-nudge wink-wink life and if that's to your taste then it belts along like a runaway Blackpool train."
