= Maelstrom (TV series) =

- Genre: Drama; Mystery
- Created by: Michael J. Bird
- Directed by: David Maloney
- Starring: Tusse Silberg; David Beames; Trevor Baxter; Susan Gilmore; Edita Brychta; John Abineri; Christopher Scoular; Ann Todd
- Composer: Johnny Pearson
- Country of origin: United Kingdom
- Original language: English
- No. of series: 1
- No. of episodes: 6

Production
- Producer: Vere Lorrimer
- Production location: Ålesund area of Norway

Original release
- Network: BBC1
- Release: 5 February – 12 March 1985

Maelstrom is a six-part BBC television drama broadcast in 1985.

The six-part serial was written by Michael J. Bird, produced by Vere Lorrimer and directed by David Maloney. The major cast members included Tusse Silberg, David Beames, Trevor Baxter, Susan Gilmore, Edita Brychta, John Abineri, Christopher Scoular and Ann Todd. The production was filmed on location in the Ålesund area of Norway.

Maelstrom was essentially a thriller series, centring on a young woman who travels to Norway to claim an inheritance. She finds herself involved in the mysterious dealings of the family of her deceased benefactor—and that someone is out to kill her.

== Credits ==
=== Main cast ===
- Tusse Silberg as Catherine Durrell
- David Beames as Anders Bjornson
- Susan Gilmore as Anna Marie Jordahl
- Christopher Scoular as Lars Nilsen
- Edita Brychta as Ingrid Nilsen
- Ann Todd as Astrid Linderman
- John Abineri as Olav Tunheim
- Trevor Baxter as Dr Albrigsten

=== Crew ===
- Series written by: Michael J. Bird
- Directed by: David Maloney
- Produced by: Vere Lorrimer
- Designed by: Bob Smart
- Theme music composed by: Johnny Pearson

== Episodes ==
Episode no.	Title	First transmission (UK)	Cast notes
1	"An Ill Wind"	5 February 1985	Paul Darrow (Oliver Bridewell); John Rowe (Mr Stoddard); Lorna Lewis (Liv Albrigsten); Peter Tuddenham (Bjarne Langva)
2	"Shadows"	12 February 1985	Sheelah Wilcocks (Gerda)
3	"In Possession"	19 February 1985	Thomasine Heiner (Mrs Tovan); Thane Bettany (Mr Tovan); Kaare Kroppan (Truck driver)
4	"House of Secrets"	26 February 1985	
5	"Into the Vortex"	5 March 1985	Alan MacNaughtan (Professor Solberg); Sheelah Wilcocks (Gerda); Ulf Borger (Journalist)
6	"Out of the Depths"	12 March 1985	Alan MacNaughtan (Professor Solberg); Sheelah Wilcocks (Gerda); Marisa Campbell (Freya)

== DVD ==
Maelstrom was released on a 2-disc DVD in Norway on 28 March 2007 and in 2015 in the United Kingdom.
