= Vere Lorrimer =

- Born: 8 June 1920
- Died: 1 October 1998 (aged 78)

Vere Lorrimer (8 June 1920 – 1 October 1998) was a British television producer and director.

His work as director included many BBC dramas including Compact, Doomwatch, Dixon of Dock Green, and Blake's 7.

He later moved on to producing, overseeing the final series of Blake's 7 in 1981, the second series of Tenko in 1982 and the drama serials The Dark Side of the Sun and Maelstrom. He also had a cameo as a tour guide in the 1988 Doctor Who serial Silver Nemesis.
