= Godfrey James =

English actor (1931–2019)

- James in Witchfinder General (1968)
- Born: 16 April 1931; London, England, U.K.
- Died: 29 October 2019 (aged 88); Eastbourne, East Sussex, England, U.K.
- Years active: 1961–2001
- Children: 1

Godfrey James (16 April 1931 – 29 October 2019) was an English actor. He was known for playing Harry Mowlem in long-running British soap Emmerdale Farm, and had roles in many other television series, including Doctor Who and The Avengers. He also had roles in films, including Séance on a Wet Afternoon (1964); Witchfinder General (1968); The Oblong Box (1969), and The Blood on Satan's Claw (1971).

== Early life and education ==
Godfrey James was born on 16 April 1931 in London, England.

== Career ==
=== Film ===
James's film appearances include: Séance on a Wet Afternoon (1964), Witchfinder General (1968), The Oblong Box (1969), Cry of the Banshee (1970), The Blood on Satan's Claw (1970), Villain (1971), Hide and Seek (1972), The Land That Time Forgot (1974), At the Earth's Core (1976), Camille (1984), Out of Order (1987) and Piccolo Grande Amore (1993).

=== Television ===
In the 1970s British police drama series The Sweeney, episode Big Spender, James appeared as hard man Charley Smith, part of an organised crime family who involve themselves with two dishonest employees of a car park company in an elaborate fraud.

He played Tarn in the Doctor Who serial Underworld (1978) and Harry Mowlem in Emmerdale Farm.

His other television credits include: The Avengers, Dixon of Dock Green, Department S, Z-Cars, UFO (the 1970 episode "The Square Triangle"), The Onedin Line, Space: 1999, The Lotus Eaters, The Carnforth Practice, Special Branch, The Sweeney, Return of the Saint, The Aphrodite Inheritance, The Standard, Minder, The Professionals, Bergerac, The Dark Side of the Sun, The Bill, Dempsey and Makepeace, Coronation Street, A Very Peculiar Practice, and Crime Traveller.

== Personal life and death ==
James married Vivienne around 1953. He had at least one child, a daughter.

He died on 29 October 2019 in Eastbourne, East Sussex.

== Partial filmography ==
- The Amorous Prawn (1962) - Sergeant at Exchange
- Séance on a Wet Afternoon (1964) - Mrs. Clayton's Chauffeur
- Witchfinder General (1968) - Webb
- The Oblong Box (1969) - Weller
- Cry of the Banshee (1970) - Head Villager
- Vertige pour un tueur (1970) - (uncredited)
- The Private Life of Sherlock Holmes (1970) - Second Carter
- The Blood on Satan's Claw (1971) - Mr. Blake - Angel's Father (uncredited)
- Villain (1971) - Car Lot Manager
- Trial (1971) - Harry Crawford
- Hide and Seek (1972) - Police Constable Dickie
- The Land That Time Forgot (1974) - Borg
- The Hostages (1975)
- At the Earth's Core (1976) - Ghak
- Arabian Adventure (1979) - Jailer (voice)
- Camille (1984, TV movie) - Gautier
- Out of Order (1987) - Desk Sergeant
- Piccolo grande amore (1993) - Franz
- Leapin' Leprechauns! (1995) - King Kevin
- Magic in the Mirror (1996) - Melilot
- Spellbreaker: Secret of the Leprechauns (1996) - King Kevin
- In the Shadow of the Sandcastle (1996) - Robin
- Magic in the Mirror: Fowl Play (1996) - Meliloto
