= Betty Arvaniti =

Greek actress (born 1939)

- Μπέτυ Αρβανίτη
- Born: Elisavet Arvaniti (Ελισάβετ Αρβανίτη); 4 August 1939 (age 87); Athens, Greece
- Occupation: Actress
- Years active: 1965–present

Betty Arvaniti (Greek: Ελισάβετ (Μπέτυ) Αρβανίτη; born 4 August 1939) is a Greek actress. She appeared in 40 films and television shows between 1965 and 2002.

== Biography ==
She was one of the most famous leading actresses of the old Greek cinema and theatre. She became known for her participation in films - productions of Finos Films in the '60s and '70s.

== Selected filmography ==
- Istoria mias zois (1965) as Mrs. Leondiadou
- Man for all the chores (1966) as mother
- Bullets don't come back (1967) as warden's mistress
- Imperiale (1968) as Zoi
- I Haravgi tis Nikis (1971) as Martha
- Thema syneidiseos (1973) as Mrs. Sakellaropoulou
- Who Pays the Ferryman? (TV series, 1977) as Annika Zeferis
- The Dark Side of the Sun (TV series, 1983) as Ismini Christoyannis
- Broken Vein (2025) as Georgia
