= Get Lost! =

- Genre: Comedy drama
- Written by: Alan Plater
- Directed by: Lawrence Gordon Clark
- Starring: Alun Armstrong; Bridget Turner; Michael Goldie; Sheila Reid; David Calder; Brian Southwood
- Theme music composer: Duke Ellington
- Opening theme: "Dual Highway"
- Ending theme: "Dual Highway"
- Composer: Frank Ricotti
- Country of origin: United Kingdom
- Original language: English
- No. of series: 1
- No. of episodes: 4

Production
- Executive producer: David Cunliffe
- Producer: Michael Glynn
- Running time: c. 50 minutes per episode

Original release
- Network: ITV (Yorkshire Television)
- Release: 12 June – 3 July 1981

Related
- The Beiderbecke Trilogy

Get Lost! is a British television drama serial made by Yorkshire Television in 1981 for the ITV network. Written by Alan Plater, the plot concerns the disappearance of the husband of Leeds schoolteacher Judy Threadgold (Bridget Turner). Investigating the disappearance, with the aid of her colleague, woodwork teacher Neville Keaton (Alun Armstrong), Judy learns of the existence of a secret organisation that helps disaffected people leave their unhappy lives behind.

Alan Plater's The Beiderbecke Affair (1985) started out as a sequel to Get Lost! but was rewritten with new characters when Alun Armstrong proved unavailable to reprise the role of Neville Keaton.

== Plot ==
The plot of Get Lost! concerns the disappearance of Jim Threadgold (Brian Southwood), husband of English teacher Judy Threadgold (Turner). Aided by her colleague, woodwork teacher Neville Keaton (Armstrong), Judy sets out to find out what has happened to her husband. Judy and Neville soon discover the existence of a secret organisation dedicated to assisting people who want to escape the mundanity of their lives and families and just disappear. Although Judy eventually finds her missing husband, she is none too enthusiastic about taking him back and allows him to seek a new life running a fish and chip shop. Her adversarial relationship with Neville blossoms into a love affair.

== Cast ==
- Bridget Turner as Judy Threadgold
- Alun Armstrong as Neville Keaton
- David Calder as Det. Sgt. Tomlin
- Michael Goldie as Meagan
- Colin Sharp as the disc jockey
- Sheila Reid as Miss Langley
- Neil McCarthy as Herbert Doyle
- Rosalie Williams as Mrs Crimmins
- Lizzie Mickery as Mrs Bingham
- Ray Dunbobbin as Rev. Perry
- John Franklyn-Robbins as Insp. Fagan

== Production ==
=== Development ===
Alan Plater had begun writing for television in the early 1960s and had been a regular writer on the police series Z-Cars (1962–78) and its spin-off series Softly, Softly (1966–69) and Softly, Softly: Task Force (1969–76). He had also written several plays for the BBC and ITV and created and wrote the sitcom Oh No, It's Selwyn Froggitt! (1974). Plater's scripts were noted for their strong depiction of the lives of the inhabitants of Northern England. In 1978, Plater was commissioned by David Cunliffe, an executive producer at Yorkshire Television (YTV), to adapt J. B. Priestley's The Good Companions as a thirteen part serial. Plater was only able to stretch the plot to fill nine episodes and so offered to write four episodes of what he called a "non-violent thriller" to make up the balance.

=== Writing ===
Using characters inspired by Nick and Nora Charles, the detectives in the film The Thin Man (1934) and its sequels, Plater sought to juxtapose the conventions of the hardboiled thriller, as expounded by the likes of Raymond Chandler and Dashiell Hammett, with the mundanity of life in Yorkshire. The plot was inspired by a newspaper article that reported that 20,000 people went missing in the UK each year.

In creating his two protagonists – Neville Keaton and Judy Threadgold (named after Sunderland goalkeeper Harry Threadgold) – Plater hit upon the idea of making them schoolteachers, saying, "I tried to think of the least likely place to find two detectives and I came up with a staffroom of a comprehensive school in Leeds". Plater apportioned elements of his own interests to his two heroes, making Judy an environmental campaigner and Neville a football and jazz fan. Neville's love of jazz is reflected in the serial's soundtrack which features re-recordings, by Frank Ricotti and featuring Kenny Baker, of tracks by the likes of Duke Ellington.

=== Casting ===
Cast as Neville Keaton was Alun Armstrong who, at the time, had worked with the National Theatre and the Royal Shakespeare Company and would later go on to enjoy a varied television career with roles in such programmes as Our Friends in the North (1996), This Is Personal: The Hunt for the Yorkshire Ripper (2000) and New Tricks (2003–2013).

Judy Threadgold was played by Bridget Turner, an actress best known for her stage work, especially works by Alan Ayckbourn, and had previously appeared in episodes of Sutherland's Law (1973–76) and Target (1977–78).

=== Filming locations ===
The series was mainly filmed around the Leeds area. Settings included:

- The pub in "Worried about Jim" – The Garden Gate in Hunslet.
- The Literary Society meeting place – Town Hall, Yeadon.
- Tong School, Westgate Hill, Bradford
- The Perrys' church: St Saviour, Richmond Hill

== Episodes ==
No.	Title	Directed by	Written by	Original release date	Viewers (millions)
1	"Worried About Jim"	Lawrence Gordon Clark	Alan Plater	12 June 1981	10.5
2	"The Vicar Did It"	Lawrence Gordon Clark	Alan Plater	19 June 1981	12.7
3	"Kiss Me Quick"	Lawrence Gordon Clark	Alan Plater	26 June 1981	11.5
4	"Not A Proper Ending"	Lawrence Gordon Clark	Alan Plater	3 July 1981	8.8

== Spin-off ==
Get Lost! aired to respectable ratings – averaging 10.9 million viewers across its run – and Plater soon began work on a sequel. When it transpired than Alun Armstrong would not be available to reprise the role of Neville Keaton, Plater decided that, rather than recasting the role, he would create two new characters and rewrite the scripts. The sequel to Get Lost! was reworked by Plater into what was to become The Beiderbecke Affair (1985), the first serial in what was to become known as The Beiderbecke Trilogy.

== Home media ==
Get Lost! was released on region 2 DVD by Network in 2006 as an extra in a box-set release of The Beiderbecke Trilogy.
