= Union Castle =

Television series

- Genre: Sitcom
- Written by: Eric Paice
- Directed by: Douglas Argent
- Starring: Stratford Johns; Moray Watson; Wanda Ventham
- Country of origin: United Kingdom
- Original language: English
- No. of series: 1
- No. of episodes: 7

Production
- Producer: Eric Prytherch
- Running time: 30 minutes
- Production company: Granada Television

Original release
- Network: ITV
- Release: 19 April – 7 June 1982

Union Castle is a British comedy television series that was originally broadcast on ITV in 1982.

Lord Mountainash, the left wing leader of a Trade Union, buys Runnymeade Castle as a base for his campaign against the Thatcher government. This meets with fierce opposition from the Conservative-supporting residents Wordsworth the butler and Lady Thaxted.

== Main cast ==
- Stratford Johns as Lord Mountainash
- Moray Watson as Wordsworth
- Wanda Ventham as Ursula, Lady Thaxted
- Lyndon Hughes as Annie Evans
- Carol MacReady as Elizabeth Steel

== Bibliography ==
- Palmer, Scott. British Film Actors' Credits, 1895-1987. McFarland, 1988.
