= Moray Watson =

English actor (1928–2017)

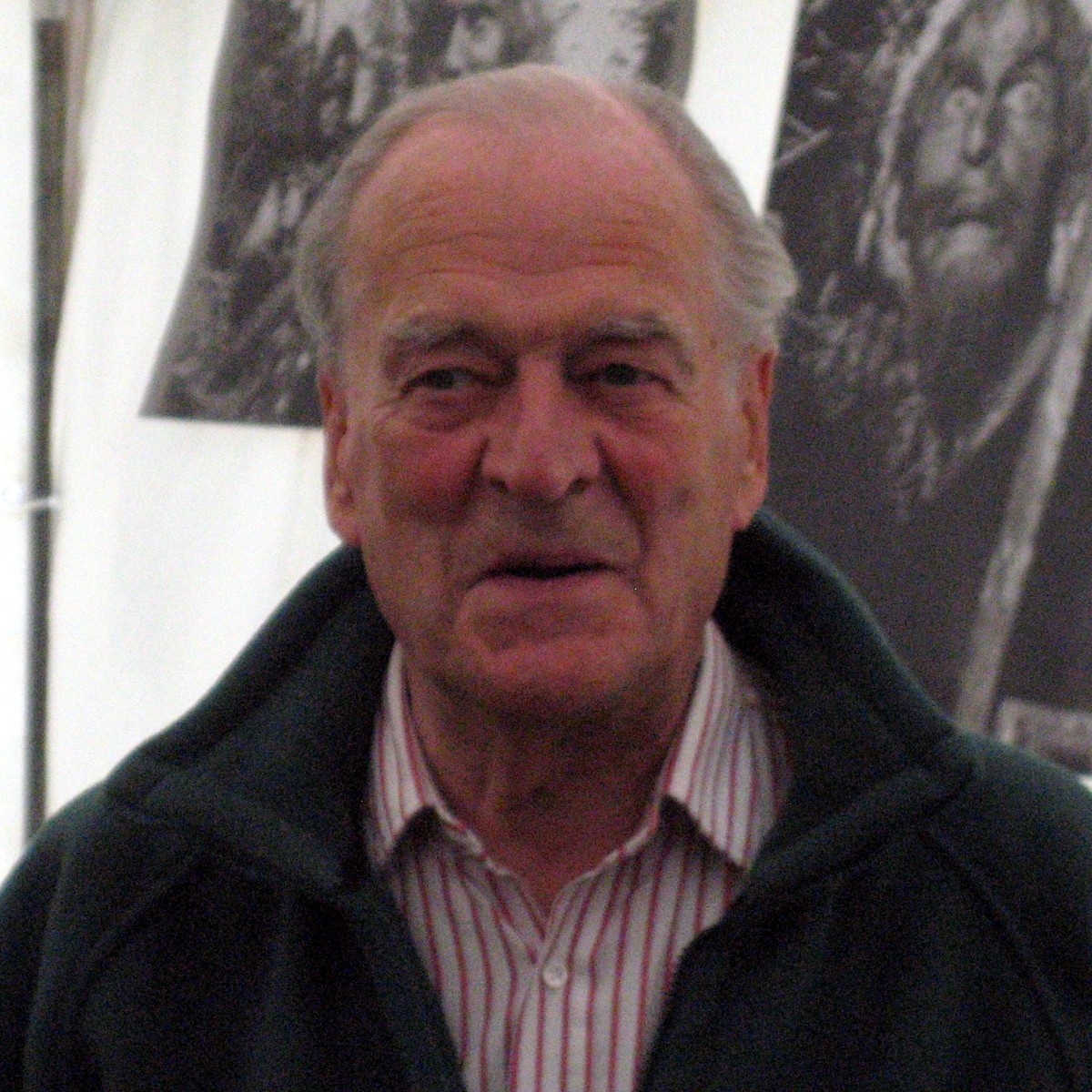
- Moray Watson 2009
- Born: Moray Robin Philip Adrian Watson; 25 June 1928; Sunningdale, Berkshire, England
- Died: 2 May 2017 (aged 88); Hillingdon, London, England
- Occupation: Actor
- Years active: 1953–2014
- Spouse: Pamela Marmont (m. 1955; died 1999)
- Children: 2
- Relatives: Percy Marmont (father-in-law); Patricia Marmont (sister-in-law)

Moray Robin Philip Adrian Watson (25 June 1928 – 2 May 2017) was an English actor from Sunningdale, Berkshire, whose career spanned over six decades on stage, television, and film. He is best known for his role as Brigadier Arthur Maiford in The Darling Buds of May (1991–1993) and as George Frobisher in Rumpole of the Bailey (1978–1992). His film work included Operation Crossbow and The Grass Is Greener, in which he starred alongside Cary Grant and Deborah Kerr. He also undertook three one-man shows during his career and published an autobiography, Looking Back and Dropping Names, in 2016.

== Life ==
Watson was born in Sunningdale, Berkshire, to Gerard Arthur Watson (1901–1940), a ship broker, who was killed during World War II at Anzegem in Belgium as a Captain in the Royal Sussex Regiment, and Jean, née McFarlane. His two elder brothers - the younger being John Norman Pembroke Watson (1927-2008), author, hunting correspondent for Country Life magazine and formerly polo correspondent for The Times - were Majors in the British Army. He was educated at Eton College.

He met his future wife Pam, daughter of silent film star Percy Marmont, at The Webber Douglas Academy of Dramatic Art. They went on to marry in 1955 and had two children, Emma in 1957 and Robin in 1959, both of whom went into the theatre world.

== Career ==
Watson made his first appearance on stage while still a student at the Webber Douglas Academy of Dramatic Art at a matinee performance in memory of Ellen Terry at Hythe, Kent. After appearances in repertory, he appeared on the West End stage, including The Doctor's Dilemma and in The Rivals by Sheridan both at the Haymarket Theatre.

In 1963, he went to New York City to appear in The Private Ear and The Public Eye. He played the part of the Art Editor in the BBC series Compact for some years.

He appeared in several films, including Operation Crossbow and The Grass Is Greener, in which he played opposite Cary Grant, Deborah Kerr, Robert Mitchum and Jean Simmons.

Watson had a series of television credits to his name, most notably as Brigadier Arthur Maiford, MC (ret.) (but always known to the Larkins as "The General") in The Darling Buds of May (1991–1993); and George Frobisher in Rumpole of the Bailey (1978–1992). He also appeared as Sir Robert Muir in the Doctor Who story Black Orchid; and had a small role in Yes Minister. He also appeared in the 1974 version of The Pallisers as Barrington Erle and in the Albert Campion mystery The Case of the Late Pig as the Chief Constable. He also played a Chief constable in the 1977 BBC series Murder Most English and Mr Bennet in the 1980 BBC series Pride and Prejudice.

In addition to his long career on stage, television and film Moray Watson undertook three one-man shows. The first in the 1970s was The Incomparable Max based on the life and work of Max Beerbohm, written for him by Sheilah Ward and Peter Ling. Years later in the early 2000s he took on Ancestral Voices, based on the diaries of James Lees-Milne written by Hugh Massingberd. His final one-man show was written and devised by himself based on his own life as an actor, entitled Looking Back and Dropping Names, which was published in book form in September 2016. Watson died at the age of 88 on 2 May 2017.

== Partial TV and filmography ==
- The Quatermass Experiment (1953, TV Series) as Peter Marsh
- Find the Lady (1956) as Jimmy
- No Wreath for the General (1960, TV Series) as Major Johnny Brookman
- The Grass Is Greener (1960) as Trevor Sellers, the Butler
- The Valiant (1962) as Captain Turnbull
- Compact (1962-1965, TV Series) as Richard Lowe
- Silas Marner (1964, TV Series) as Godfrey Cass
- The Saint (1964, TV Series) as Ken Shield
- Operation Crossbow (1965) as Colonel Kenneth Post
- The Avengers (1966, TV Series) as Peters
- Z-Cars (1969, TV Series) as Harold Thorburn
- Every Home Should Have One (1970) as Chandler
- Rookery Nook (1970, TV Movie) as Clive Popkiss
- Catweazle (1971, TV Series) as Lord Collingford
- Upstairs, Downstairs (1972, TV Series) as Colonel Winter
- The Pallisers (1974, TV Mini-Series) as Barrington Erle
- Quiller (1975, TV Series) as Angus Kinloch
- Murder Most English (1977, TV Series) as Chief Constable Chubb
- Life of Shakespeare (1978, TV Mini-Series) as Nicholas
- Return of the Saint (1978, TV Series) as Buckingham
- Rumpole of the Bailey (1978–1992, TV Series) as George Frobisher
- Pride and Prejudice (1980, TV Mini-Series) as Mr. Bennet
- The Sea Wolves (1980) as Breene
- The Professionals (1980, TV Series) as Jeremy Sangster
- Nobody's Perfect (1980–1982, TV Series) as Henry Armstrong
- Winston Churchill: The Wilderness Years (1981, TV Mini-Series) as Major Desmond Morton
- The Walls of Jericho (1981, TV Mini-Series) as Dr. George Balfour
- Doctor Who (1982, TV Series - Black Orchid) as Sir Robert Muir
- Union Castle (1982, TV series) - Wordsworth
- Tales of the Unexpected (1982, TV Series) as Sir Ian Masterson
- Yes Minister (1982, TV Series - The Challenge) as BBC Director of Policy
- Minder (1984, TV Series) as Commander Hawksly
- Miss Marple (1984, TV Mini-Series - The Body in the Library) as Colonel Bantry
- Who Dares Wins (1986, TV Series)
- Still Crazy like a Fox (1987, TV Movie) as Hubbard
- Worlds Beyond (1987, TV Series) as Roger Cranley
- Rude Health (1987, TV Series) as Sir Nigel Toft
- Star Cops (1987, TV Series) as Commander
- Campion - "The Case of the Late Pig" (1989, TV Series) as Sir Leo Pursuivant
- Norbert Smith: A Life (1989, TV Movie) as Sir Donald Stuffy
- The New Statesman (1991, TV Series) as Professor Eugene Quail
- The House of Eliott (1991, TV Series) as The Judge
- A Murder of Quality (1991, TV Movie) as Major Harriman
- The Darling Buds of May (1991-1993, TV Series) as Brigadier
- To Be the Best (1992, TV Movie) as Hunter
- Haggard (1992, TV Series) as Henry Nugent
- The Vicar of Dibley (1994, TV Series) as The Stranger
- Kavanagh QC (1999, TV Series) as Sir Henry Dorrister
- Midsomer Murders (2000, TV Series) as Edward Allardice
- Bertie and Elizabeth (2002, TV Movie) as Lord Dawson
- My Family (2011, TV Series) as George
- Run for Your Wife (2012) as Man on the Bus

== Publications ==
- Looking Back and Dropping Names: A Memoir An autobiography, published in September 2016, by The Erskine Press.
