= Killer (TV series) =

Television series

- Genre: Thriller
- Starring: John Thaw; Anthony Valentine; Edward Woodward
- Country of origin: United Kingdom
- Original language: English
- No. of series: 1
- No. of episodes: 3

Production
- Producer: David Cunliffe
- Running time: 60 minutes
- Production company: Yorkshire Television

Original release
- Network: ITV
- Release: 17 February – 2 March 1984

Killer is a British television series that was originally broadcast on ITV in 1984. It consisted of three stand-alone episodes, produced by Yorkshire Television.

== Episodes ==
- Killer Waiting (17 February 1984) featuring John Thaw and Diane Keen. Directed by Michael Ferguson.
- Killer Exposed (24 February 1984) featuring Anthony Valentine and Dearbhla Molloy
- Killer Contract (2 March 1984) featuring Edward Woodward and Wanda Ventham

== Bibliography ==
- Maxford, Howard. Hammer Complete: The Films, the Personnel, the Company. McFarland, 2018.
- Singer, Michael. Film Directors: A Complete Guide. Watson-Guptill Publications, Incorporated, 1993.
