= Athina-Thessaloniki =

- Created by: Nikos Mouratidis
- Directed by: Christos Paligiannopoulos
- Starring: Spyros Papadopoulos; Filareti Komninou
- Country of origin: Greece
- Original language: Greek
- No. of seasons: 1

Production
- Running time: 45 minutes

Original release
- Network: ERT1
- Release: 1997 – 1998

Athina-Thessaloniki (Athens to Thessaloniki) is a Greek television series, that was aired in season 1997-98 by ERT1. The series was written by Nikos Mouratidis and it starred Spyros Papadopoulos and Filareti Komninou. It stood out for its soundtrack composed by Evanthia Reboutsika and performed by Nana Mouskouri.

== Plot ==
A musician and a philologist live in the two biggest Greek cities, Athens and Thessaloniki. They are both married, but when they fall in love between them, they collide with their families. Eventually, their relationship ends to a dead-end mostly because of the distance of their residence places.

== Cast ==
- Spyros Papadopoulos
- Filareti Komninou
- Katerina Didaskalou
- Louiza Podimata
