= Louiza Podimata =

She was born in Russia, a student of Veaki and Rontiris, she changed, with some times, in a characteristic role with laughs, she began with Marika Kotopouli's company, employed with Katerona of Manolidou-Aronis-Horn company, she enlisted herself for a decade in the power of the National Theatre and played with Lambeti - Horn, Moussouri, Katrakis, Vergis, Myrat (Murat), Vougiouklaki, Alexandrakis, Galineas, Dandoulaki, Ferti, Denissis, Kalogeropoulou and many others, received her little stone in the history of Greek theatre. She presented for many years (from 1939) on stage, on screen and on television.

Louiza Podimata died on 9 March 2001.

== Filmography ==
=== Film ===
Year	Film title (English translation)	Original title and transliteration	Role
1960	Papadopoulos Family	Οικογένεια Παπαδοπούλου; Ikoyenia Papadoopoulou	Katina Karidoglou
1960	O taxitzis	Ο ταξιτζής	-
1963	The Third Way	Ο τρίτος δρόμος O tritos dromos	-
1964	Kravgi	Κραυγή	-
1965	O epanastasis	Ο επαναστάτης	-
1966	Up to the Ships	Μέχρι το πλοίο Mehri to plio	-
1967	An milouisse to parelthon mou	Αν μιλούσε το παρελθόν μου	-
1969	I archontissa tou limaniou	Η αρχόντισσα του λιμανιού The Harbour Countess	Eleni
1969	I orgi tou adikimenou	Η οργή του αδικημένου	-
1971	Zoi choris chamogelo	Ζωή χωρίς χαμόγελο	-
1972	Katigoro ti zoi	Κατηγορώ τη ζωή	-
1972	I amartia tis omorfias	Η αμαρτία της ομορφιάς	-
1972	Oi xenitemenoi	Οι ξενιτεμένοι	-
1972	O echthros tou laou	Ο εχθρός του λαού	-
1973	Thema syneidiseos	Θέμα συνειδήσεως	-
1974	Enas nomotagis politis	Ένας νομοταγής πολίτης	-
1977	O kyr Giannis ekpaidevetai	Ο κυρ Γιώργης εκπαιδεύεται	a lady
1983	Trelos kai pasis Ellados	Τρελός και πάσης Ελλάδος	-

=== Television ===
Year	Title (English translation)	Original title and transliteration	Channel
1972	Koritsi tis Kyriakis	Κορίτσι της Κυριακής	EIRT
1972	Stisichorou '73	Στησιχόρου ’73	YENED
1973	Gioi tou Kein/Kine?	Γιοι του Κάιν	EIRT
1974	Luna Park	Λούνα Παρκ; Amusement Park	EIRT
1977	Oi Pantheoi	Οι Πανθέοι	ERT
1979	Tycheroi kai atychoi	Τυχεροί και άτυχοι	YENED
1981	Ola tou gamou dyskola	Όλα του γάμου δύσκολα	ERT
1982	Avles kai retire	Αυλές και ρετιρέ	YENED
1983	Mrs. Do-Re-Mi	Η Κυρία Ντο-Ρε-Μί; I Kiria Do-Re-Mi	ERT
1990	Akrivi mou Sofia	Ακριβή μου Σοφία	ET1
1997	Athens to Thessaloniki	Αθήνα - Θεσσαλονίκη; Athina-Thessaloniki	ET1
