= Land of the Minotaur =

1976 horror film

- Directed by: Kostas Karagiannis
- Written by: Arthur Rowe
- Produced by: Frixos Constantine
- Starring: Donald Pleasence; Peter Cushing
- Music by: Brian Eno
- Production companies: Getty Pictures Corp. Poseidon Films
- Distributed by: Cathay Films (UK); Crown International Pictures (US)
- Release dates: 11 August 1976 (Greece and UK); 25 May 1977 (US)
- Running time: 95 minutes
- Countries: United Kingdom; United States
- Language: English
- Box office: $1,020,000

Land of the Minotaur (UK title: The Devil's Men; also known as Minotaur, The Mask of the Demons) is a 1976 horror film starring Donald Pleasence and Peter Cushing, directed by Kostas Karagiannis, written by Arthur Rowe, with a score by Brian Eno. Land of the Minotaur is the 86-minute US cut of the film; The Devil's Men is the full 94-minute European cut.

== Plot ==
In Greece, a cult led by Baron Corofax kidnaps tourists visiting an archaeological site and murders them as sacrifices to the Devil, who has taken the form of a fire-breathing Minotaur statue. After dropping in on their acquaintance Father Roche, student couple Ian and Beth and their friend Tom become the latest abductees.

Joined by Tom's girlfriend Laurie and private detective Milo Kaye, Roche begins an investigation of the nearby village. Most of the residents, led by police sergeant Vendris, claim ignorance of the recent events. One terrified woman tries to pass information to the three foreigners but is murdered by the cult in her own home. Recognising a baby's toy as a Minoan artefact linked to human sacrifice, Roche realises that the whole village – including children – is involved in the cult.

As Corofax and the other cultists prepare to sacrifice Ian and Beth, Roche and Kaye find the students' van and use it to gatecrash the ritual, running over a hooded Vendris in the process. Having already killed Ian and Beth, the cult immediately disperses. Magically armoured by his membership of the cult, Vendris walks away uninjured.

The cult kidnaps Laurie from her room at the local inn. Demanding answers, Kaye confronts and beats Vendris, who is now back in his police uniform. Corofax, who has stopped at the inn, pulls a rifle on Roche and Kaye and orders them to leave. Roche and Kaye set out to rescue Laurie and Tom.

In the Minotaur's cave temple, the cult begins the sacrifice. Armed with a handgun, Kaye arrives and shoots at the cultists, but the Minotaur's power has made his followers bulletproof. Captured, Kaye is about to be killed alongside Laurie and Tom when Roche appears and performs exorcism, sprinkling holy water over the Minotaur. The statue explodes and all the cultists except the children combust and vanish. As the survivors leave the temple, Roche says that the children were spared because their souls are still pure.

== Cast ==
- Donald Pleasence as Father Roche
- Peter Cushing as Baron Corofax
- Luan Peters as Laurie Gordon
- Kostas Karagiorgis (credited as Costas Skouras) as Milo Kaye
- Fernando Bislamis (credited as Dimitris Bislanis) as Sgt Vendris
- George Venlis as Max, Corofax's chauffeur
- Vanna Reville as Beth
- Nikos Verlekis as Ian
- Robert Behling (credited as Bob Behling) as Tom Gifford
- Anna Mantzourani as Mrs Mikaelis
- Anestis Vlahos as Karapades, a shopkeeper
- Jane Lyle as Milo's girlfriend
- Jessica Dublin (credited as Jessica) as Mrs Zagros

== Production and Release ==
The Devil’s Men was produced by Poseidon Films, an independent company formed in London by Greek-Cypriot Frixos Constantine in partnership with famed British director Michael Powell, with additional funding from Getty Pictures Corporation, a US company. It was filmed in Greece and released in Greece and the UK by Cathay Films on 11 August 1976; on 25 May 1977, it was released by Crown International Pictures in the US, where it was retitled Land of the Minotaur and had its running time trimmed by eight minutes.

== Reception ==
TV Guide scored the movie one out of four stars, describing it as "[a] distinctly silly effort".

HorrorNews.net found the movie enjoyable despite its contrived plot, commending its soundtrack (by Brian Eno) and the interaction between its two main characters.

According to John Stanley, it is "a dreadful British-Greek production...Bereft of logic, characterizations, suspense and anything else that makes watchable cinema."

Del Vecchio and Johnson write that "The film itself is a preposterous labyrinth of false starts and dead ends. It's tediously predictable and gleefully flaunts scripter Arthur Rowe's total lack of imagination. None of his characters, unfortunately, were ever able to escape the first dimension and one becomes painfully aware that a five-minute plot cannot be stretched into a 94-minute running time. Technically [the film] fares even worse. The sound quality is literally a disaster and dubbing is so poorly done that even though Pleasence and Cushing are speaking English on film, their lip movements are off synch on the soundtrack! Editing is even worse, with scene changes cutting into dialogue...Both Donald Pleasence and Peter Cushing are hideously squandered..."

David Miller terms the movie [a] "muddled story of ancient rites and blood sacrifice...The sound in the film is hollow and indistinct, the photography clumsy and the script feeble...far too much is made of the pagan idol, a pint-size statue of a minotaur with two gas-burners up its nose..." [though Peter Cushing] "looks formidable striding through the caves in his crimson robes."

Praising the "suffocating ambiance and dream-like atmosphere", as well as Brian Eno's electronic score, Chris Alexander argues that the movie is underrated: "Make no mistake, it's a lowbrow exploitation film, but it's one that’s filtered through a very stylised art house sensibility. Don't be swayed by the negative mainstream reviews and general fanboy silence."

Emanuel Levy rated the movie three out of five.

== Home video ==
Land of the Minotaur has been released in the US in both VHS and DVD formats, the latter paired with Blood Mania, another horror exploitation film. On 22 February 2022, The Devil’s Men was released on Blu-ray in the UK and US by Powerhouse Films; this edition included both the original UK version and Land of the Minotaur, the shorter US theatrical version.
