= Susan Gilmore =

English actress

- Born: Susan Gilmore; 24 November 1954 (age 71); London, England
- Occupation: Television actress
- Spouse: Daniel Topolski
- Children: 3, including Tamsin Topolski

Susan Gilmore (born 24 November 1954) is an English actress with television credits including Elizabeth Fitt in the BBC hospital drama Angels and Avril Rolfe in Howards' Way. She was also a cast member in the thriller serial Maelstrom.

Gilmore was married to rower Daniel Topolski until his death in February 2015.
