= Trevor Baxter =

British actor and playwright (1932–2017)

- Born: 18 November 1932; Lewisham, London, England
- Died: 16 July 2017 (aged 84)
- Occupation(s): Actor, playwright

Trevor Baxter (18 November 1932 – 16 July 2017) was a British actor and playwright. He is possibly best remembered for playing Professor George Litefoot in the Doctor Who story The Talons of Weng-Chiang, and the subsequent audio spinoff Jago & Litefoot.

== Early years ==
A postal worker's son, Baxter was born in Lewisham, London, England, and was educated at Dulwich College and the Royal Academy of Dramatic Art.

== Career ==
Baxter's credits include: Adam Adamant Lives!, Z-Cars, Maelstrom, Thriller, The New Avengers, Jack the Ripper, (1988) The Barchester Chronicles (1982) An Englishman Abroad (1983) and Doctors. He appeared in the Doctor Who serial The Talons of Weng-Chiang (1977) as Professor George Litefoot and in 1978 in Rumpole of the Bailey. He reprised his role of Professor Litefoot in an episode of the audio series, Doctor Who: The Companion Chronicles: The Mahogany Murderers. The following year he was Professor Litefoot again for a continuing series of Jago & Litefoot.

Baxter worked with the Royal Shakespeare Company (RSC) and in the West End, toured Shakespeare in South America with Sir Ralph Richardson, and also appeared in the US in David Mamet's A Life in the Theatre at Shakespeare Santa Cruz in 1986. He appeared in many films including Nutcracker (1983), Parting Shots (1999), Sky Captain and the World of Tomorrow (2004) and Van Wilder: The Rise of Taj (2006).

Baxter also wrote a number of plays including Lies, The Undertaking, and Office Games. His play Ripping Them Off was given its first performance at the Warehouse Theatre Croydon on 5 October 1990, directed by Ted Craig and designed by Michael Pavelka. The cast consisted of: Ian Target (Graham), Angus Mackay (Revd. Parkinson), Caroline Blakiston (Grace), Annette Badland (Hilda), Frank Ellis (Julian), Ewart James Walters (Max), Anthony Woodruff (Pauken), Ian Burford (Inspector Sands), Richard Clifford (Jeff) and C.P. Grogan (Susanna).

In 2003, Baxter adapted Oscar Wilde's novella The Picture of Dorian Gray for the stage, followed in March 2005 by a touring version of Wilde's short story, Lord Arthur Savile's Crime, revived in January 2010 at the Theatre Royal Windsor, starring Lee Mead in the title role.

Baxter continued to record Doctor Who audio dramas for Big Finish Productions as Professor Litefoot, having completed thirteen series.

On 17 July 2017, it was announced that Baxter had died the previous day. The cause of death was not made public.

== Filmography ==
=== Film ===
| Year | Title | Role | Notes |
|---|---|---|---|
| 1950 | The Cruise of the Toytown Belle | | TV film |
| 1961 | Seven Keys | Police Constable | Uncredited |
| 1962 | Struck Off | First Doctor | TV film |
| 1966 | A Man for All Seasons | First Man | Uncredited |
| 1978 | A Most Public Affair | Witness | TV film |
| 1979 | The Life Of Henry The Fifth | Archbishop of Canterbury | TV film |
| 1982 | Nutcracker | Charlie Barker | |
| 1983 | An Englishman Abroad | Pyjama Shop Manager | TV film |
| 1986 | The Great White Mountain | Prior | TV film |
| 1986 | Ping Pong | Priest in Church | |
| 1995 | Cold Comfort Farm | Sneller | TV film |
| 1997 | The Hunchback | Chief Lawyer | TV film |
| 1998 | Parting Shots | Maitre d' | |
| 2004 | Sky Captain and the World of Tomorrow | Dr. Jennings | |
| 2006 | Van Wilder: The Rise of Taj | Sir Wilfred Own | |

=== Television ===
| Year | Title | Role | Notes |
|---|---|---|---|
| 1956 | Tales from Soho | | Episode: "The Rajah's Rope" |
| 1961 | Harpers West One | Compere | 1 episode |
| 1961 | Boyd Q.C. | Mr. Austin QC | Episode: "The Headmistress" |
| 1961 | Doctor Faustus | Scholar | 1 episode |
| 1961 | Drama 61-67 | Second Lieutenant Roberts | Episode: "The Face of the Enemy" |
| 1962 | BBC Sunday-Night Play | Mr. Wakley | Episode: "Six Men of Dorset" |
| 1962 | Somerset Maugham Hour | Verity | Episode: "The Back of Beyond" |
| 1963 | Drama 61-67 | Personnel Officer | Episode: "Andersen" |
| 1963 | Lorna Doone | Visitor from London | Episode: "The Secret" |
| 1963 | Taxi! | Doctor | Episode: "The Accident" |
| 1964 | Story Parade | Leo Marchant | Episode: "The Flaw in the Crystal" |
| 1965 | The Wednesday Play | Dr. Paul Evans | Episode: "The Seven O'Clock Crunch" |
| 1966 | Thirteen Against Fate | Priest | Episode: "The Witness" |
| 1966 | Mystery and Imagination | Undertaker | Episode: "The Body Snatcher" |
| 1966 | Public Eye | Howells | Episode: "There Are More Things in Heaven and Earth" |
| 1966 | Adam Adamant Lives! | Mr. Burke | Episode: "The Village of Evil" |
| 1967 | Adam Adamant Lives! | Beardsley | Episode: "Black Echo" |
| 1967 | The Seven Deadly Virtues | Reverend Johnson | Episode: "The Man with Two Heads" |
| 1967 | Boy Meets Girl | Vicar | Episode: "The Raging Moon" |
| 1967 | ITV Play of the Week | Mr. Williams | Episode: "The Small Rebellion of Jess Calvert" |
| 1967 | ITV Play of the Week | Vicar | Episode: "The Voysey Inheritance" |
| 1967 | The White Rabbit | M. Lecompte-Boynet | Episode: "The Raising Up" |
| 1968 | Z-Cars | William Orchard | Episode: "Inside Information" |
| 1968 | Mystery and Imagination | Cannon Tabard | Episode: "Feet Foremost" |
| 1970 | The Roads to Freedom | Blythe-Hardwick | Episode: "The Reprieve" |
| 1973 | The Edwardians | Schomberg McDonnell | Episode: "Daisy" |
| 1973 | So It Goes | Mr. Bunce | 2 episodes |
| 1973 | BBC Play of the Month | Roger Garrett | Episode: "The Common" |
| 1974 | Zodiac | Neville | Episode: "The Cool Aquarian" |
| 1974 | Centre Play | Mayor | Episode: "Albert and the Mayor's Tree" |
| 1975 | BBC Play of the Month | Colonial Secretary | Episode: "The Apple Cart" |
| 1975 | Thriller | Winters | Episode: "Where the Action Is" |
| 1975 | Edward the Seventh | Bishop of London | Episode: "The Boy" |
| 1975 | Spy Trap | Gordon Beng | Episode: "With Friends Like You" |
| 1975 | Against the Crowd | Mr. Stone | Episode: "We Are All Guilty" |
| 1976 | Lorna Doone | Baron de Whichehalse | Miniseries |
| 1976 | The New Avengers | Brown-Fitch | Episode: "The Eagle's Nest" |
| 1976 | Dickens of London | Reverend Townshend | Episode: "Magic" |
| 1977 | Doctor Who | Professor Litefoot | Episode: "The Talons of Weng-Chiang" |
| 1977 | Rough Justice | Mr. Burrowes | Miniseries |
| 1977 | George and Mildred | The Reverend Stopes | Episode: "Jumble Pie" |
| 1978 | Rumpole of the Bailey | Maurice Nooks | Episode: "Rumpole and the Heavy Brigade" |
| 1979 | George and Mildred | Oxfam Man | Episode: "Finders Keepers?" |
| 1982 | The Barchester Chronicles | Dr. Gwynne | 2 episodes |
| 1983 | The Dark Side of the Sun | Dr. Phillimore | 2 episodes |
| 1984 | Horizon | Professor Breene | Episode: "The Intelligence Man" |
| 1985 | Maelstrom | Dr. Albrigtsen | Miniseries |
| 1988 | Jack the Ripper | Lanyon | Miniseries |
| 1991 | Selling Hitler | Frank Giles | Miniseries |
| 1993 | Paul Merton: The Series | | 1 episode |
| 1995 | The Politician's Wife | Gordon Naylor | Miniseries |
| 2006 | Doctors | Sam | Episode: "Three's a Crowd" |
| 2006 | My Family | Lionel | Episode: "The Art of Being Susan" |
