= Wanda Ventham =

English actress (born 1935)

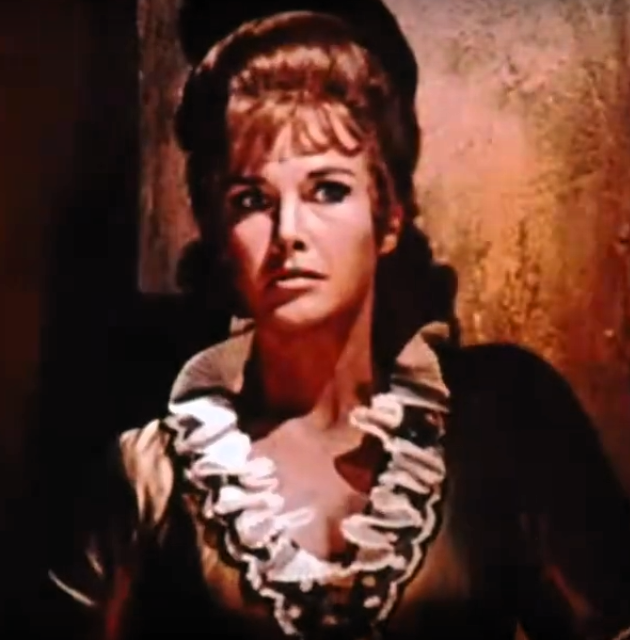
- Ventham in The Blood Beast Terror (1968)
- Born: 5 August 1935 (age 91); Brighton, Sussex, England
- Education: Central School of Speech and Drama
- Occupation: Actress
- Years active: 1956–present
- Spouses: James Tabernacle (m. 1957; div. 1974) Timothy Carlton (m. 1976)
- Children: 2, including Benedict Cumberbatch
- Relatives: Sophie Hunter (daughter-in-law)

Wanda Ventham (born 5 August 1935) is an English actress with many roles on British television since beginning her career in the 1950s.

Ventham played Colonel Virginia Lake in the 1970s science-fiction television series UFO and had a recurring role as Cassandra Trotter's mother Pamela Parry in the sitcom Only Fools and Horses between 1989 and 1992. Her many other television appearances include Danger Man, The Rag Trade, The Sweeney, The Avengers, The Saint, Doctor Who, The Gentle Touch, Minder, Heartbeat and Holby City, and she appeared in two Carry On films.

In April 2014, People magazine featured her in its "Most Beautiful People in the World" edition.

== Early life ==
Ventham was born in Brighton on 5 August 1935, the daughter of Gladys Frances (née Holtham) and Frederick Howard Ventham. Originally aspiring to become an artist, she attended art school for a year whilst working as a scenic painter for the Connaught Theatre in Worthing, West Sussex, during her school holidays. The exposure to professional theatre prompted her to leave art school and pursue a career in acting. She trained at the Central School of Speech and Drama, as a contemporary of Judi Dench, graduating in 1956.

== Career ==
Ventham's first film role was in My Teenage Daughter (1956), with Dame Anna Neagle and Sylvia Syms. She also appeared as a debutante in 1962 with a ten-second talking role in the Norman Wisdom film On the Beat and in 1963 as a nurse in the Norman Wisdom film A Stitch in Time – both were uncredited.

She also appeared in Carry On Cleo (1964) and Carry On Up the Khyber (1968). She starred alongside Mark Burns in the mystery film Death Is a Woman (1966). Her best-known role was on television as Col. Virginia Lake, second-in-command to Commander Ed Straker (Ed Bishop), in the cult series UFO.

Ventham's numerous other TV credits include regular roles in Heartbeat as Fiona Weston, Hetty Wainthropp Investigates as Margaret Balshaw, and in Series 2 and 3 of The Rag Trade as Shirley. She also played a love interest for Arthur Daley in Minder, Susan's mother in Coupling, and Deborah's mother in Men Behaving Badly. She starred opposite Ian Hendry in the 15-part BBC series The Lotus Eaters (1972–73), had a recurring role in The Troubleshooters, and made a guest appearance in the fifth episode of the first season of the BBC Two sketch show Rutland Weekend Television. She was in an episode of Danger Man, and the series Patrick McGoohan completed immediately afterwards – the allegorical spy series The Prisoner – as well as the sitcoms Executive Stress and Next of Kin, and the sketch show The Two Ronnies.

She has appeared in Doctor Who on three occasions over three decades; as Jean Rock in The Faceless Ones (1967), as Thea Ransome in Image of the Fendahl (1977) and as Faroon in Time and the Rani (1987). Her appearance in Image of the Fendahl was opposite Denis Lill, with whom she would later act when they were cast as Pamela and Alan Parry in the sitcom Only Fools and Horses (1989–1992).

In 2014, she and her husband Timothy Carlton appeared in the BBC adaptation of Sherlock as the parents of Sherlock Holmes, who is played by their son Benedict Cumberbatch. Ventham appeared in Holby City as Sheilagh Chiltern, the grandmother of Lofty Chiltern.

== Personal life ==
Ventham married her first husband James Tabernacle in 1957 and they had one daughter, Tracy. They divorced on 12 November 1974. She met actor Timothy Carlton in 1970 while filming sequences for the drama series A Family at War and they have been married since April 1976. The couple appeared together in the second series of BBC drama The Lotus Eaters in 1973, and in the third and fourth series of BBC's Sherlock in 2014 and 2017, where they played the title character's parents, with their son, actor Benedict Cumberbatch starring in the title role of Sherlock Holmes.

== Filmography ==
=== Film ===
Year	Title	Role	Notes
1956	My Teenage Daughter	Gina	
1959	The Navy Lark	Mabel	
1961	We Joined the Navy	The "Initiative test" girl	
1962	Solo for Sparrow	Waitress	
1963	The Cracksman	Sandra	
1964	Carry On Cleo	Pretty Bidder	Uncredited
1965	The Big Job	Dot Franklin	
1965	The Knack ...and How to Get It	Gym Mistress	Uncredited
1966	Death Is a Woman	Priscilla Blunstone-Smythe	
1966	The Spy with a Cold Nose	Mrs. Winters	
1967	Mister Ten Per Cent	Kathy	
1968	The Blood Beast Terror	Clare Mallinger	Ventham also provided stunt work for the film and appeared in costume as the giant moth monster.
1968	Carry On Up the Khyber	Khasi's First Wife	
1974	Invasion: UFO	Col. Virginia Lake	
1974	Captain Kronos – Vampire Hunter	Lady Durward	
2002	Mrs Caldicot's Cabbage War	Victoria	
2005	Asylum	Bridie Straffen	
2012	Run for Your Wife	Lady on Bus	Cameo
2016	Absolutely Fabulous: The Movie	Violet	Cameo

=== Television ===
Year	Title	Role	Notes
1959-1962	ITV Television Playhouse	Penny/Morya	2 episodes
1961-1966	No Hiding Place	Janet Farley/Liz Forster	2 episodes
1962	The Edgar Wallace Mystery Theater	Waitress	Episode: "Solo for Sparrow"
1962–1963	The Rag Trade	Shirley	Seasons 2-3
1963	BBC Sunday-Night Play	Julie	Episode: "Two by the Sea #2: Wedding Bells"
1964	The Human Jungle	Nurse	Episode: "Success Machine"
1964	Thorndyke	Maud	Episode: "A Case of Premeditation"
1964–1965	Danger Man	Stella Dorset; Penny	2 episodes
1964–1966	The Saint	Laura Stride/Penny Pearson	2 episodes
1965	The Worker	Sandra	Episode: "No Automation Without Representation"
1965	The Likely Lads	Angela	Episode: "Last of the Big Spenders"
1965	The Avengers	Nurse Spray	Episode: "The Gravediggers"
1966	Two of a Kind	Auntie Yum Yum/Ern's Wife	2 episodes
1966	The Rat Catchers	Kjellin/Gerde	2 episodes
1966	Hugh and I		Episode: "Tooting Footlights"
1966	Armchair Theatre	Julie/Milly Craddock	2 episodes
1966	Mrs Thursday	Rowena Grant	Episode: "Hunter's Moon"
1966	Watch the Birdies	Irene Grant	Miniseries
1966	Out of the Unknown	Josephine	Episode: "The Eye"
1967	ITV Play of the Week	Erica	Episode: "Dr. De Waldo's Therapy"
1967	The Prisoner	Computer Attendant	Episode: "It's Your Funeral"
1968	City '68	Alison	Episode: "Love Thy Neighbour"
1968	The Caesars	Ennia	Episode: "Caligula"
1968	Love Story	Birgit	Episode: "The Vast Horizons of the Mind"
1967–1971	The Troubleshooters	Moira Hart	4 episodes
1967; 1977; 1987	Doctor Who	Jean Rock; Thea Ransome/Fendahl Core; Faroon	Serials: "The Faceless Ones", "Image of the Fendahl" and "Time and the Rani"
1969	The Gold Robbers	Dee Latter	Episode: "An Oddly Honest Man"
1969	Department S	Leila Rankin	Episode: "The Man from 'X'"
1969	Dixon of Dock Green	Debbie Franklin	Episode: "Bobby"
1970	Z-Cars	Mrs. Owen	Episode: "By Bread Alone Part One"
1970–1971	A Family At War	Jenny Graham	3 episodes
1970–1971	UFO	Col. Virginia Lake	9 episodes
1970	Doctor at Large	Maggie Weston	Episode: "Mr. Moon"
1971	Thirty-Minute Theatre	Jasmine	Episode: "Walt, King of the Dumper"
1971	The Fenn Street Gang	Elinor	Episode: "Change Partners"
1972–1973	The Lotus Eaters	Ann Shepherd	Miniseries
1975	The Sweeney	Brenda	Episode: "Abduction"
1975	Softly, Softly: Task Force	Julie Brent	Episode: "The Talking Doll"
1975	Rutland Weekend Television	Various characters	2 episodes
1976	Emmerdale Farm	Heather Bannerman	6 episodes
1977	Crown Court	Sybil Halstead	2 serials
1978–1979	Fallen Hero	Dorothy Hopkins	Lead role; 11 episodes
1980	The Two Ronnies	Jack	2 episodes
1982	Minder	Beryl Murdoch	Episode: "Dreamhouse"
1982	Union Castle	Ursula, Lady Thaxted	7 episodes
1982	The Further Adventures of Lucky Jim	Veronica Allen	Episode: "A Foot in the Door"
1982	The Brack Report	Kate Randall	Chapter 7
1982	Only When I Laugh	Fiona	Episode: "Conduct Unbecoming"
1984	Killer Contract	Dorothy Routledge	TV film
1986–1987	Executive Stress	Sylvia	Recurring; 4 episodes
1988	All Creatures Great and Small	Mrs. Ridge	Episode: "The Jackpot"
1989	Capstick's Law	Madge Capstick	6 episodes
1989	Boon	Marion Kershaw	Episode: "Of Meissen Men"
1989–1992	Only Fools and Horses	Pamela Parry (Cassandra's Mum)	4 episodes
1993	Just a Gigolo	Marge Payne	3 episodes
1995–1996	Next of Kin	Rosie	6 episodes
1996–1997	Heartbeat	Fiona Weston	4 episodes
1997	Alas Smith and Jones		Episode: "Cookery"
1997	Men Behaving Badly	Penny (Deborah's Mum)	Episode: "Ten"
1998	The Vanishing Man	Mrs. Braithwaite	Episode: "Nothing Up My Sleeve"
1998	Hetty Wainthropp Investigates	Margaret Balshaw	2 episodes
1998	Casualty	Mrs. Seabrook	Episode: "Everlasting Love"
2000	Randall & Hopkirk (Deceased)	Alice Fullcup	Episode: "Mental Apparition Disorder"
2001	Coupling	Edna (Susan's Mum)	Episode: "My Dinner in Hell"
2005	Midsomer Murders	Romany Rose	Episode: "Second Sight"
2007	Lewis	Eleanor Mallory	Episode: "Expiation"
2014–2017	Sherlock	Mrs. Holmes (Sherlock Holmes' mother)	Episodes: "The Empty Hearse", "His Last Vow" and "The Final Problem"
2014–2018	Holby City	Sheilagh Chiltern	Recurring; 10 episodes
2018	Father Brown	Ellen Jennings	Episode: "The Angel of Mercy"
2019	Departure	Wendy	2 episodes
2020	Penance	Fay	3 episodes

=== Theatre ===
Year	Title	Role	Venue
1960	Watch It, Sailor!	Daphne Pink	Apollo Theatre, London
1979	Julius Caesar	Portia	Chichester Festival Theatre, Chichester
1990	Out of Order	Pamela	Shaftesbury Theatre, London
1992	It Runs in the Family	Rosemary Mortimore	Playhouse Theatre, London
2002	One for the Pot	Amy Hardcastle	Theatre Royal, Windsor
2012	Quartet	Cissy	Theatre-on-the-Bay, Cape Town
2014	Entertaining Angels	Ruth	Theatre-on-the-Bay, Cape Town
