= Season's Greetings (play) =

1980 play by Alan Ayckbourn

- Written by: Alan Ayckbourn
- Characters: Neville; Belinda; Bernard; Harvey; Phyllis; Eddie; Pattie; Rachel; Clive
- Original language: English
- Subject: Dysfunctional families

Premiere
- Date premiered: 25 September 1980
- Place premiered: Stephen Joseph Theatre (Westwood site), Scarborough
- Official website

Season's Greetings is a 1980 play by British playwright Alan Ayckbourn. It is a black, though often farcical, comedy about four days in the life of a dysfunctional family starting on Christmas Eve, and is set in a typical English suburban house.

== Characters ==
The characters seen on stage are the nine adults present in the house. All the children are off-stage characters, although a few productions have been known to use child actors.

The nine adults are:

- Bernard, a feeble-spirited doctor with strong views on non-violence. Every year he creates an elaborate puppet show for the children, which he fondly imagines they enjoy (though they actually hate it)
- Phyllis, Bernard's lush of a wife, whom Bernard struggles to support
- Neville, Phyllis's brother, always busy fiddling with anything mechanical out in his shed
- Belinda, who endures a stale marriage to Neville, resorting to flapping about the house and constantly dressing the Christmas tree
- Eddie, a lacklustre and lazy man who tried to strike out on his own but failed and pesters his friend Neville for work
- Pattie, Eddie's pregnant wife, largely ignored, who can only nag at him and wish she were not having another child
- Rachel, Belinda's emotionally fuddled sister
- Clive, a writer, in a non-starter of a relationship with Rachel
- Harvey, Neville and Phyllis's uncle, a cantankerous man who boasts about "thirty years' experience" as a security officer and bemoans the collapse of society while himself gorging on TV violence, much to Bernard's annoyance

== Plot ==
The play begins on Christmas Eve. Harvey and Bernard argue over the violence shown in a film on TV while Neville and Eddie obsess over building remote-controlled Christmas tree lights; all the men largely ignoring their wives. Rachel becomes anxious over the late arrival of Clive, eventually leaving the house to look for him. When Clive arrives he meets Belinda and they swiftly develop a mutual attraction.

Throughout Christmas Day Clive grows closer to Belinda and more distant from Rachel. Finally around midnight, after a drunken game of snakes and ladders when Belinda and Clive believe everyone has gone to bed, they attempt to have sex in the sitting room but are thwarted when they set off a toy drumming bear, which rouses everyone else.

On Boxing Day, Bernard goes through the rehearsal of a dreadful puppet production of The Three Little Pigs. But after only two of the sixteen scenes, Harvey grabs the puppets and begins a fight, enraging Bernard.

On the 27th, Clive tries to sneak off first thing in the morning but Harvey shoots him, mistaking him for a looter. Bernard incompetently pronounces him dead. When Clive recovers, he is taken to hospital, leaving Neville and Belinda together, Neville having chosen to ignore what happened between her and Clive.

== Productions ==
=== Premières ===
Season's Greetings was premièred on 25 September 1980 at the Stephen Joseph Theatre (then at the Westwood site), with the following cast:

- Harvey - Robin Herford
- Bernard - Ronald Herdman
- Belinda - Tessa Peake-Jones
- Pattie - Lavinia Bertram
- Neville - Michael Simkins
- Eddie - Jeffrey Robert
- Rachel - Marcia Warren
- Phyllis - Susan Uebel
- Clive - Robin Bowerman

The creative team was:

- Director - Alan Ayckbourn
- Design - Edward Lipscomb
- Lighting - Francis Lynch
- Music - Paul Todd

The play was shown again the following year, with the play partially recast.

The year after that, the play received its London première and the Greenwich Theatre on 28 January 1982, before transferring to the West End at the Apollo Theatre on 29 March 1982. It ran until 18 September 1982.

Season's Greetings was staged off-Broadway in New York City at the Joyce Theatre in the summer of 1985. New York Times theater critic Frank Rich gave this production by Houston's Alley Theatre a generally favorable review: "Despite the amateurish lapses of the Alley Season's Greetings — primitive production design, wavering accents, some routine acting — it is more spirited than the play's 1982 West End staging, and, at its best, both funny and disturbing."

=== Revivals ===
Season's Greetings has had numerous revivals in professional theatre, including a 2004 touring revival directed by Ayckbourn himself for the Yvonne Arnaud Theatre.

A London revival was staged at the Royal National Theatre in December 2010 and ran until March 2011.

=== Adaptations ===
In 1986 the BBC produced a television version of the play. It featured Michael Cashman, Barbara Flynn, Nicky Henson, Anna Massey, Geoffrey Palmer, Bridget Turner, Lesley Dunlop and Peter Vaughan. It was directed by Michael A. Simpson.
