= Bridget Turner =

British actress (1939–2014)

- 1970s publicity still
- Born: Bridget Joanna Turner; 22 February 1939; Cleethorpes, Lincolnshire, England
- Died: 27 December 2014 (aged 75); Dorchester, Dorset, England
- Occupation: Actress

Bridget Joanna Turner (22 February 1939 – 27 December 2014) was an English actress.

Turner played a radical English teacher, Judy Threadgold, opposite Alun Armstrong's woodwork teacher in Alan Plater's Get Lost! for Yorkshire Television, shown in 1981. Armstrong was unavailable for a sequel, so it was completely recast and became The Beiderbecke Affair with the parts going to Barbara Flynn and James Bolam. She played Phyllis in Alan Ayckbourn's TV film Season's Greetings.

On 8 May 2009, John Cleese stated in an interview that Turner was the original choice in 1974 for the role of Sybil Fawlty in Fawlty Towers. She turned it down and the part was given to Prunella Scales.

Turner married television director Frank Cox in 1977. She died on 27 December 2014 in Dorchester, Dorset, at the age of 75. She was godmother to the actor Tom Burke.

== Filmography ==
=== Film ===
Year	Title	Role	Notes
1964	Shylock Versus the Merchant of Venice	Portia	Television film
1970	The Walking Stick	Sarah Dainton	
1971	Catch Me a Spy	Woman in Plane	
1971	Under Milk Wood	Mrs. Cherry Owen	
1976	Time and Time Again	Anna	Television film
1983	Runners	Teacher	
1986	Season's Greetings	Phyllis	Television film
1996	Cuts	Mrs. Raper	Television film
1997	Remember Me?	Elderly Sister	
2002	Happy Together	Ann	Television film
2003	The Gathering	Mrs. Groves	
2008	Zip and Hollow	Vera	Television film
2009	Last Light	Stella	Short film

=== Television ===
Year	Title	Role	Notes
1961	Comedy Matinee		Episode: "Thark"
1963	Lorna Doone	Margery Babcock	Episode: "A Long Account Settled"
1964	Teletale	Ginia	Episode: "The Beautiful Summer"
1964	The Villains	Sandra	Episode: "Victim"
1964	Compact	Miss Bates	Recurring role; 3 episodes
1965	Jury Room	Lizzie Borden	Episode: "The Lady and the Axe"
1965	The Newcomers	Joyce	Episode: "Episode 19"
1966	Theatre 625	Avril Hadfield	Episode: "Semi-Detached"
1967	The Forsyte Saga	Plunket	Recurring role; 6 episodes
1967	Inheritance	Lizzie Mellor	Episode: "Murder"
1968	Resurrection	Katerina Maslova	Miniseries; 4 episodes
1970	Kate	Ann Gordon	Episode: "It's So Peaceful in the Country"
1970	Graf Yoster	Miss Turnbull	Episode: "In London weiss der Nebel mehr als wir..."
1970	ITV Sunday Night Theatre	Bridget O'Connor	Episode: "Slattery's Mounted Foot"
1970	Tom Grattan's War	Sara Schwartz	Recurring role; 3 episodes
1971	Z-Cars	Sheila Rhodes	Episode: "It Can Get to Be a Habit"
1972	Z-Cars	Mrs. French	Episode: "Operation Ascalon"
1975	Sutherland's Law	Jane Lauder	Episode: "The Rag Doll"
1977	Playhouse	Rowena	Episode: "Love-Lies-Bleeding"
1977	Target	Esther Daniels	Episode: "Lady Luck"
1978	Two's Company	Mabel	Episode: "The Take-Over Bid"
1978	Jackanory Playhouse	Queen Hermione	Episode: "Princess Griselda's Birthday Gift"
1979	Jackanory	Storyteller	Recurring role; 5 episodes
1979	Two People	Jean Fletcher	Series regular; 5 episodes
1981	Get Lost!	Judy Threadgold	Miniseries; 4 episodes
1984	Love and Marriage	Phyllis	Episode: "Home Is the Sailor"
1984	Driving Ambition	Jackie	Episode: "Manifold Depression"
1984	The Brief	Sylvia Byrne	Episode: "Keys"
1985	C.A.T.S. Eyes	Mrs. Driscoll	Episode: "Blue for Danger"
1989	Saracen	Louise Silverdale	Episode: "Infidels"
1991	Boon	Gran Mulholland	Episode: "Stamp Duty"
1992	The Bill	Mrs. Chamberlain	Episode: "Talk Out"
1993	The Bill	Mrs. Brown	Episode: "Sweet Charity"
1995	Screen Two	Frances Doyle	Episode: "Life After Life"
1995	Pride and Prejudice	Mrs. Reynolds	Episode: "Episode 4"
1995	The Bill	Mrs. Vardy	Episode: "Strictly Personal"
1995	The Thin Blue Line	Mrs. Rabbit	Episode: "Fire and Terror"
2001	Heartbeat	Daphne Merryfield	Episode: "Home Sweet Home"
2001	Peak Practice	Ruth Gaunt	Episode: "Together We Stand"
2001	Armadillo	Grandmother	Miniseries; 3 episodes
2002	Casualty	Katia Noga	Episode: "What Becomes of the Broken Hearted"
2002	Always and Everyone	Eileen Barratt	Episode: "Death of an Everyday Occurrence"
2003	Death in Holy Orders	Mildred Fawcett	Miniseries; 1 episode
2004	Doctors	Maeve	Episode: "One Last Request"
2005	Heartbeat	Lottie Ferguson	Episode: "Mastermind"
2006	Terry Pratchett's Hogfather	Tooth Fairy / Bogey Man	Miniseries; 2 episodes
2007	Doctor Who	Alice	Episode: "Gridlock"
2008	Casualty	Mrs. Stirling	Episode: "Have a Go, Hero"
2008	Terry Pratchett's The Colour of Magic	Book Burner Woman	Episode: "The Light Fantastic"
2009	Doctors	Hilary Benson	Recurring role; 2 episodes
2010	Casualty	Barbara Clark	Episode: "Last Roll of the Dice"
2011	Monroe	Judith Warden	Episode: "Episode Three"
