= Broken Vein =

2025 film

- International promotional poster
- Greek: Σπασμένη Φλέβα
- Directed by: Yannis Economides
- Written by: Yannis Economides; Vangelis Mourikis
- Starring: Vasilis Bisbikis; Maria Kehagioglou; Betty Arvaniti; Stathis Stamoulakatos
- Cinematography: Dimitris Katsaitis
- Edited by: Yannis Chalkiadakis
- Music by: Babis Papadopoulos
- Release date: 7 November 2025 (Mar del Plata)
- Running time: 127 minutes
- Countries: Greece; Cyprus
- Language: Greek

Broken Vein (Greek: Σπασμένη Φλέβα, romanized: Spasmeni fleva) is a 2025 crime-thriller film directed by Yannis Economides, co-written with Vangelis Mourikis. A co-production of Greece and Cyprus, it stars Vasilis Bisbikis, Maria Kehagioglou, Betty Arvaniti, and Stathis Stamoulakatos.

The film was nominated in 12 categories at the 2026 Hellenic Film Academy Awards, with Arvaniti winning Best Supporting Actress. It was also selected to represent Greece in the Best International Feature Film category at the 99th Academy Awards.

== Synopsis ==
Businessman Thomas Alexopoulos is desperate to repay his debt to the local loan shark to save his home, when he is presented with a last-minute solution.

== Cast ==
- Vasilis Bisbikis as Thomas Alexopoulos
- Maria Kehagioglou
- Betty Arvaniti
- Stathis Stamoulakatos

== Release ==
Broken Vein premiered on November 7, 2025 at the Mar del Plata International Film Festival in Argentina.

== Awards and nominations ==
| Year | Award | Category | Recipient(s) | Result | Ref. |
|---|---|---|---|---|---|
| 2026 | Hellenic Film Academy Awards | Best Film | Broken Vein | Nominated | |
| 2026 | Hellenic Film Academy Awards | Best Director | Yannis Economides | Nominated | |
| 2026 | Hellenic Film Academy Awards | Best Screenplay | Yannis Economides, Vangelis Mourikis | Nominated | |
| 2026 | Hellenic Film Academy Awards | Best Actor | Vasilis Bismpikis | Nominated | |
| 2026 | Hellenic Film Academy Awards | Best Actress | Maria Kehagioglou | Nominated | |
| 2026 | Hellenic Film Academy Awards | Best Supporting Actor | Yiannis Niarros | Nominated | |
| 2026 | Hellenic Film Academy Awards | Best Supporting Actress | Betty Arvaniti | Won | |
| 2026 | Hellenic Film Academy Awards | Best Film Editing | Yannis Chalkiadakis | Nominated | |
| 2026 | Hellenic Film Academy Awards | Best Original Score | Babis Papadopoulos | Nominated | |
| 2026 | Hellenic Film Academy Awards | Best Costume Design | Despina Chimona | Nominated | |
| 2026 | Hellenic Film Academy Awards | Best Sound | Aris Anastasopoulos, Costas Fylaktidis | Nominated | |
| 2026 | Hellenic Film Academy Awards | Best Make-up, Hairstyling, and Special Effects | Giannis Pamoukis | Nominated | |

== See also ==
- List of submissions to the 99th Academy Awards for Best International Feature Film
- List of Greek submissions for the Academy Award for Best International Feature Film
