= Michael J. Bird =

English writer (1928–2001)

- Born: 31 October 1928; London, England
- Died: 11 May 2001 (aged 72); Great Shelford, Cambridgeshire, England
- Occupation: Writer
- Writing career
- Notable works: The Lotus Eaters, The Town that Died

Michael John Hereford Bird (31 October 1928, in London – 11 May 2001, in Great Shelford, Cambridgeshire) was an English writer. He was best known for four television drama series he wrote for the BBC, set in the Mediterranean.

The Lotus Eaters (1972–1973) and Who Pays the Ferryman? (1977) were set in Crete, The Aphrodite Inheritance (1979) was set in Cyprus, and The Dark Side of the Sun (1983) took place on Rhodes. His final series for the BBC, Maelstrom (1985), was set in Norway.

Bird also wrote for the following series during his career: Danger Man, Special Branch, Quiller, The Onedin Line, Out of the Unknown ("To Lay a Ghost" and "The Uninvited"), Arthur of the Britons, Secret Army and Warship.

Bird formed his own production company, named Gryphon Productions, and negotiated a number of co-productions with the BBC.

He was the author of The Town That Died: a Chronicle of the Halifax Disaster, released by Souvenir Press of London in 1962.

In 2006, The Life and Work of the Man Who Created The Lotus Eaters, a biography of Bird, was released by David Rice via Krasakis Press.
