= Stefan Gryff =

Polish-Australian actor (1938–2017)

- Born: 5 May 1938; Warsaw, Poland
- Died: 3 June 2017 (aged 79)

Stefan Gryff (5 May 1938 – 3 June 2017) was a Polish-Australian actor. He specialised in playing Poles, Russians, Greeks and other Mediterranean types.

Gryff studied law at the University of Sydney and during his studies appeared in several plays and revues with the University dramatic societies. He practised as a criminal lawyer in Australia before leaving for London where he appeared in a number of stage plays before moving into television and films. He is best known for his role as Captain Krasakis in the TV series The Lotus Eaters, its sequel Who Pays the Ferryman?, and also as Charolambous in The Aphrodite Inheritance.

In 1967 he appeared in the Television series The Avengers in the episode entitled "Mission ... Highly Improbable". http://www.theavengers.tv/forever/peel2-24.htm

His film appearances include Julia (1977), Reds (1981), White Nights (1985), Surviving Picasso (1996), Anna Karenina (1997) and The Saint (1997). He also appeared in episodes of the television series The Avengers, Beau Geste, The Onedin Line, Poirot, Midnight Man and Holby City.

Before his death, he worked as a screen acting coach.

== Filmography ==
Year	Title	Role	Notes
1968	A Dandy in Aspic	Russian	
1968	Isadora	Russian Party Interpreter	
1970	The Executioner	Shay Cell Group Survivor	
1972	Ooh... You Are Awful	Capo Mafioso	
1975	Legend of the Werewolf	Max Gerard	
1977	The Assignment	Ortega	
1977	Julia	'Hamlet'	
1978	Sweeney 2	Nino	
1980	Bad Timing	Policeman #2	
1981	Reds	Alex Gomberg	
1985	Eleni	Tasso	
1985	White Nights	Captain Kirigin	
1985	Revolution	Capt. Lacy	
1987	Ishtar	KGB Agent #1	
1988	Pascali's Island	Izzet Effendi	
1996	Surviving Picasso	Drunken Comrade	
1997	The Saint	President's Aide	
1997	Anna Karenina	Korunsky	
2000	Proof of Life	Bank Official	
