= Arthur Rowe (screenwriter) =

American screenwriter and television producer (1923–1998)

- Born: Arthur William Rowe; September 26, 1923; Los Angeles, California, U.S.
- Died: August 8, 1998 (aged 74); Beverly Hills, California, U.S.
- Occupations: Screenwriter, television producer
- Years active: 1952–1984
- Notable work: Fantasy Island; The Bionic Woman; The Magnificent Seven Ride!
- Spouse: Gloria Rowe (m. 1955; died 1998)

Arthur William Rowe (September 26, 1923 – August 8, 1998) was an American screenwriter and television producer.

== Early life ==
Arthur Rowe was born and raised in Los Angeles, California. Rowe served in the South Pacific during World War II with the U.S. Marine Corps. Following his discharge, he began his writing career by penning comedy bits for the network radio shows of Eddie Cantor and Jack Benny.

== Career ==
Rowe spent most of his career in the entertainment industry writing for several television series including The Bionic Woman, The Six Million Dollar Man and Gunsmoke. He also penned three screenplays; Zeppelin (1971), The Magnificent Seven Ride! (1972) and Land of the Minotaur (1976). He served as producer of the iconic TV series Fantasy Island, having produced 137 episodes and writing 13 of them.

Rowe also wrote teleplays for The Big Valley (ABC, 1965–69), Kolchak: The Night Stalker (ABC, 1974–75) and Switch (CBS, 1975–78).

== Death ==
Following a lengthy illness, Rowe died in his home in Beverly Hills on August 8, 1998, at the age of 74. His wife of 42 years, Gloria, passed in March of the same year. He was survived by his daughter, Laure, and his son, Gordon. He had four grandchildren, a sister and a brother.
