= Peter Whitaker =

English actor (1921–2002)

- Born: Peter Osborn Whitaker; 12 February 1921; West Ham, London, England
- Died: 24 November 2002 (aged 81); Brighton, Sussex, England
- Occupation: Actor
- Notable work: Rumpole of the Bailey

Peter Whitaker (12 February 1921 – 24 November 2002) was an English actor who appeared as bar owner Jack Pomeroy in the first series of Rumpole of the Bailey.

== Early life ==
Leaving school at 16, Whitaker initially worked as a salesman at Simpson's department store in London until the outbreak of the Second World War. Being a member of the Territorial Army, he was called up and served in the Forces until 1946, spending the last three years with the Palestine Police.

== Career ==
After his demobilisation, Whitaker gained a grant and studied at the London Academy of Music and Dramatic Art, wanting to become a singer. Graduating four years later, he worked as a singer in many musicals in the West End, as well as touring the UK.

By the late 1950s, Whitaker was offered walk-on work for television and soon swapped the stage for TV. One notable role was playing the murdered police inspector Gascoigne in the Doctor Who serial The Faceless Ones, as well as appearing as a supporting extra in many other episodes of the series, including The Seeds of Death and The Pirate Planet. He also appeared in many other television series' such as Taxi!, The Forsyte Saga, Dad's Army, Upstairs, Downstairs and Blake's 7.
