= David Cunliffe (producer and director) =

British television director and producer (1935–2022)

- Born: 18 April 1935; Cheam, Surrey, England
- Died: 1 January 2022 (aged 86)
- Occupations: Television producer and director
- Years active: 1961–2022

David Cunliffe (18 April 1935 – 1 January 2022) was a British television director and producer whose long career, which began in 1961, encompassed numerous television films as well as well as hundreds of episodes of some of Britain's best-remembered television series and miniseries.

Born in the outer London village of Cheam, Cunliffe became interested in drama while attending Tiffin School in Kingston upon Thames. This interest led to his winning, at age 16, a Queen's Scholarship to the Royal Academy of Dramatic Art (RADA) after which he worked for several years in repertory theatre around England until he became, in his mid-twenties, one of Granada Television's directors during Coronation Street's earliest years. Over the succeeding decades he accumulated a very large body of work as a director, producer-director or executive producer, much at Yorkshire Television, in such programmes as 1962's Before My Time, 1965's The Man in Room 17, the 1969 and 1970 programmes, Great Performances, Ryan International and Dr. Finlay's Casebook, 1971's Kate, 1972's The Onedin Line, 1973's Warship, 1974's Who Killed Lamb?, Fall of Eagles and Good Girl, 1975's The Main Chance, 1976's Hadleigh, Forget Me Not and Dickens of London, 1977's Raffles and Beryl's Lot, 1979's Flambards and The Sandbaggers, 1981's The Good Companions and Get Lost!, 1982's Airline and ITV Playhouse, 1984's Sorrell and Son and Killer, 1985's The Beiderbecke Affair, 1986's Love and Marriage, 1989's A Bit of a Do, 1995's Oliver's Travels, 2001's Victoria & Albert, 2006's The Shell Seekers and many others.

Several of the TV series and other productions which David Cunliffe directed or produced were also broadcast in the United States. The Onedin Line achieved considerable popularity when it was broadcast by stations of the non-commercial PBS network. Two years after its original showing, Fall of Eagles was transmitted on cable/satellite station TBS and, in 1990, was shown on another cable/satellite station, Bravo which, at the time, was operating as a high-quality, non-commercial outlet devoted to the arts. One of the productions on which he worked, The Attic: The Hiding of Anne Frank, a 1988 Telecom Entertainment/Yorkshire Television film, shown by CBS, won a Primetime Emmy Award for its writer, William Hanley, as well as a number of nominations for other achievements, including acting, directing and producing, with David Cunliffe receiving a nomination as co-executive producer...one of the nine executives who were nominated for overseeing the production.

Cunliffe died on 1 January 2022, at the age of 86.
