= Timos Perlegas =

Greek actor

Timos Perlegas (October 22, 1938 in Patras – April 19, 1993 in Maroussi) was a Greek actor. He died from a heart attack.

== Early life ==
Timos was born on October 22, 1938 in Patras. He was the seventh and last child of a family of merchants. Due to financial difficulties, in 1955 he settled in Athens in search of more opportunity. At 18 he had a serious health problem and after his recovery he started working as an industrial worker. In 1961, he began acting school at Theater Department of the Stavrakos School. Among his teachers were Manos Katrakis and Giorgos Theodosiadis.

== Career ==
He first appeared on stage as a member of the Karolos Koun theater company in The Persians by Aeschylus. Later on, he toured Europe with The Birds by Aristophanes. He also worked with the National Theatre of Modern Greece for two years as well as the Karezi-Kazakos company. He also appeared in the cinema and on TV.

Perlegas was a member of the Communist Party of Greece since 1975.

== Theater ==
Some of the plays he appeared in include:

- A Hatful of Rain by Michael V. Gazzo
- Sweet Bird of Youth by Tennessee Williams
- The Visit by Friedrich Dürrenmatt
- The Girl from Maxim's by Georges Feydeau
- The day after the fair by Thomas Hardy

== Filmography ==
- Ego rezilepsa ton Hitler (1970)
- Mia gynaika stin Antistasi (1970)
- Manto Mavrogenous (1971)
- Lysistrati (1972)
- Thema syneidiseos (1973)
- Kai xana pros ti doxa trava (1980)
- O Thanasis kai to katarameno fidi (1982)
- Tha se klepso, m' akous? (1982) .... as Mr. Karyadis
- O Fonias (1983) .... as Yanis
- To Kolie (1985)
- Ena senario einai i zoi mas (1985) .... as Mitsos Giavroglou
- Paraxeni sinantissi (1986) .... as Mimis
- O Kloios (1987)
- BIOS kai politeia (1987)
- ...kai dyo avga Tourkias (1987) .... as Uncle
- Dexiotera tis dexias (1989)
- Ypoptos politis (1994)
