= Steve Plytas =

British actor (1913–1994)

- Born: Phokion Stavros Plytas; 9 January 1913; Constantinople, Ottoman Empire
- Died: 27 December 1994 (aged 81); Surrey, England
- Occupation: Actor
- Years active: 1957–1990
- Spouse: Amy Foxell (m. 1947)

Phokion Stavros Plytas (9 January 1913 – 27 December 1994), known professionally as Steve Plytas, was a Greek film and television actor based in the United Kingdom.

His stage work included West End appearances in Tennessee Williams' The Night of the Iguana (1965) and Agatha Christie's The Mousetrap (1970s).

Credited film roles include Passport to Shame, Beyond the Curtain, The Moon-Spinners, The Spy Who Came In from the Cold, Theatre of Death, Interlude, Ooh... You Are Awful, Silver Bears, Revenge of the Pink Panther, Carry On Emmannuelle, The Bitch, Eleni, Superman IV: The Quest for Peace and Batman.

TV credits include: The Schirmer Inheritance, The Avengers, Danger Man, The Troubleshooters, The Saint, Doctor Who (in the serial The Tenth Planet), Z-Cars, The Champions, Department S, Dixon of Dock Green, Man About the House, Fawlty Towers, Who Pays the Ferryman?, The Professionals, Minder, Strangers, The Two Ronnies and Tales of the Unexpected.

== Filmography ==
- A Night to Remember (1958) – Greek Steerage Passenger Arguing with James Kieran (uncredited)
- Passport to Shame (1958) – French Restaurant Manager
- Operation Amsterdam (1959) – Bar Owner (uncredited)
- The Treasure of San Teresa (1959) – Station sergeant
- Beyond the Curtain (1960) – Zimmerman
- Very Important Person (1961) – Luftwaffe Officer
- Two Wives at One Wedding (1961) – Bellac
- The Pursuers (1961) – Petersen
- Light in the Piazza (1962) – Concierge (uncredited)
- The Victors (1963) – Waiter (uncredited)
- Becket (1964) – Cardinal (uncredited)
- The Moon-Spinners (1964) – Hearse Driver
- The Spy Who Came In from the Cold (1965) – East German Judge
- Those Magnificent Men in their Flying Machines (1965) – Continental Journalist (uncredited)
- Theatre of Death (1967) – Andre, Patron of Cafe
- Interlude (1968) – Frederico
- Duffy (1968) – Moroccan (uncredited)
- Vendetta for the Saint (1969) – Cirano
- Oh! What a Lovely War (1969) – Turkish Military Attaché (uncredited)
- On Her Majesty's Secret Service (1969) – Greek Tycoon (uncredited)
- The Executioner (1970) – Police Inspector (uncredited)
- Ooh... You Are Awful (1972) – Signor Vittorio Ferruchi
- Never Mind the Quality Feel the Width (1973) – Swiss Guard
- S*P*Y*S (1974) – Wedding Usher (uncredited)
- The Bunny Caper (Sex Play) (1974) – Krashneff
- Silver Bears (1977) – Clerk
- Revenge of the Pink Panther (1978) – Douvier's Board member
- Carry On Emmannuelle (1978) – Arabian Official
- The Bitch (1979) – Louis Almond
- Orion's Belt (1985) – Russian Ambassador
- Eleni (1985) – Christos
- The Return Of Sherlock Holmes "The Six Napoleon's" (1986) - Venucci Snr.
- Superman IV: The Quest for Peace (1987) – Russian General #2
- Batman (1989) – Doctor
- Goldeneye (1989) – Dragoumis
- Dilemma (1990) – Basil Stratos
