= Who Pays the Ferryman? =

- Opening titles
- Genre: Drama
- Created by: Michael J. Bird
- Starring: Jack Hedley; Betty Arvaniti; Stefan Gryff; Neil McCarthy; Patience Collier; Takis Emmanuel
- Theme music composer: Yannis Markopoulos
- No. of series: 1
- No. of episodes: 8

Production
- Producer: William Slater
- Production locations: Elounda, Crete

Original release
- Network: BBC2
- Release: 7 November – 26 December 1977

Who Pays the Ferryman? is a television series produced by the BBC in 1977. The title of the series alludes to the ancient religious belief and mythology surrounding Charon, the ferryman to Hades. In antiquity, it was customary to place coins in or on the mouth of the deceased before cremation, symbolising payment for the ferryman's service to transport them to Hades.

The series comprises eight episodes, all written by Michael J. Bird, who drew upon his knowledge of Crete, where the series is set, incorporating local history and folklore. Enhanced by breathtaking scenery, the serial achieved success when aired on BBC2 in 1977.

== Premise ==
A former soldier returns to Crete to reassess his life after his boatbuilding business is bought out, thirty years after he fought alongside the local resistance (andartes) during the Second World War. There, he encounters the ghosts of his past and individuals intent on causing him harm, disrupting his present happiness and peace of mind.

== Plot ==
After enduring personal and professional setbacks, boat designer Alan Haldane (Jack Hedley) decides to revisit Crete after a 30-year absence. Now a widower and having sold his business, Haldane seeks to rediscover meaning and a sense of belonging, reminiscent of his experiences during World War II. During the war, Haldane fought alongside the Andartes against the occupying German army, earning the honorary name "Leandros" due to his skill and bravery, which became legendary locally. He also had a romance with co-partisan Melina Matakis, with whom he parted temporarily during repatriation. However, upon returning to England, his letters to Melina went unanswered, leading to a permanent separation.

Feeling adrift, Haldane receives a mostly positive reception from many who remember the exploits of "Leandros". Upon arriving in the area where he was stationed with Melina, he encounters Annika, a local homeowner. As they exchange glances, Haldane and Annika, a charming and successful businesswoman, immediately connect on an unconscious level. Despite Annika's divorce, which goes against Cretan values, she and Haldane effortlessly bond, recognising a mutual need for each other that grows stronger each time they cross paths, which happens increasingly often over time.

Haldane finally reunites with his Greek "brother," Babis Spiridakis, whom he was nearly inseparable from during the war. While Haldane is glad to see Babis, the latter only acknowledges Leandros' presence after a long separation. As they talk, surprising revelations emerge. Both Haldane and Melina had written letters to each other, which neither received. Haldane learns that Melina passed away four years ago. However, the complexity deepens when Babis reveals that Melina was pregnant with Haldane's child, a daughter who now runs a tavern with her husband and has given birth to Haldane's grandchild. The bond between Haldane and Annika becomes immediately complicated as Babis discloses that Annika is Melina's sister, making her Haldane's daughter's aunt.

Determined to connect with his daughter and grandchild without their knowledge, Haldane faces a dilemma. He cannot reveal the truth to Annika, with whom he is falling deeply in love, as it would shatter their worlds. Meanwhile, adversaries from the past, like Annika's formidable mother, Katerina, who still harbour ancient grudges, conspire against Haldane. The stage is set for a Greek tragedy, with roles cast long ago, playing out to a bitter conclusion.

== Filming ==
The series' location sequences were filmed in and around Elounda. Its theme tune, composed by Yannis Markopoulos, made it to the UK singles chart in late 1977 and early 1978.

== Credits ==
=== Cast ===
The primary characters are:

- Jack Hedley as Alan Haldane
- Betty Arvaniti as Annika Zeferis
- Stefan Gryff as The Major
- Neil McCarthy as Babis Spiridakis
- Takis Emmanuel as Matheos Noukakis
- Patience Collier as Katerina Matakis
- Nikos Verlekis as Nikos Vassilakis
- Maria Sokali as Elena Vassilakis
- Alexis Sergis as Alexis Vassilakis

=== Crew ===
- Series created and written by Michael J. Bird
- Produced and directed by William Slater
- Designs by Myles Lang
- Theme music composed by Yannis Markopoulos

== Episodes ==
Episode no.	Title	First transmission (UK)	Cast notes
1	"Return to Yesterday"	7 November 1977	Marina Sirtis (Ariadne); Bernard Brown (David Haldane); Lambros Kotsiris (Georgios Kaladis)
2	"Some Talk of Alexander"	14 November 1977	Jack Watson (William Hebden); Lalla Ward (Jo Hebden); Costas Passalis (Dimitrios); Yannis Himondis (Andreas Hagieleftheris)
3	"The Long Shadow"	21 November 1977	Ann Lynn (Lorna Matthews); Steve Plytas (Petros Matakis)
4	"A Dead Man to Carry My Cross"	28 November 1977	Gareth Thomas (Tony Viglis); Steve Plytas (Petros Matakis); Costas Baladimas (Father Nikolaos); John Eastham (Customs official)
5	"Receive the Light"	5 December 1977	Nikos Kouros (Xenophon Hasapis)
6	"The Well"	12 December 1977	Patrick Magee (Duncan Neve); Elizabeth Chambers (Mary Cooper); Allan Mitchell (Leonard Cooper); Sally Knyvette (Samantha Ross)
7	"A River to Cross"	19 December 1977	Nikos Kouros (Xenophon Hasapis)
8	"The Daughters of Themis"	26 December 1977	Kevork Malikyan (Doctor); Lambros Kotsiris (Georgios Kaladis); Anastasia Divoli (Maria Kaladis)

== Novel ==
A novel with the same title was penned by Michael J. Bird in 1993.
