= St James' Church, Seacroft =

Coordinates: 53°49′06.8″N 1°27′32.9″W

St James' Church
- Church of Saint James
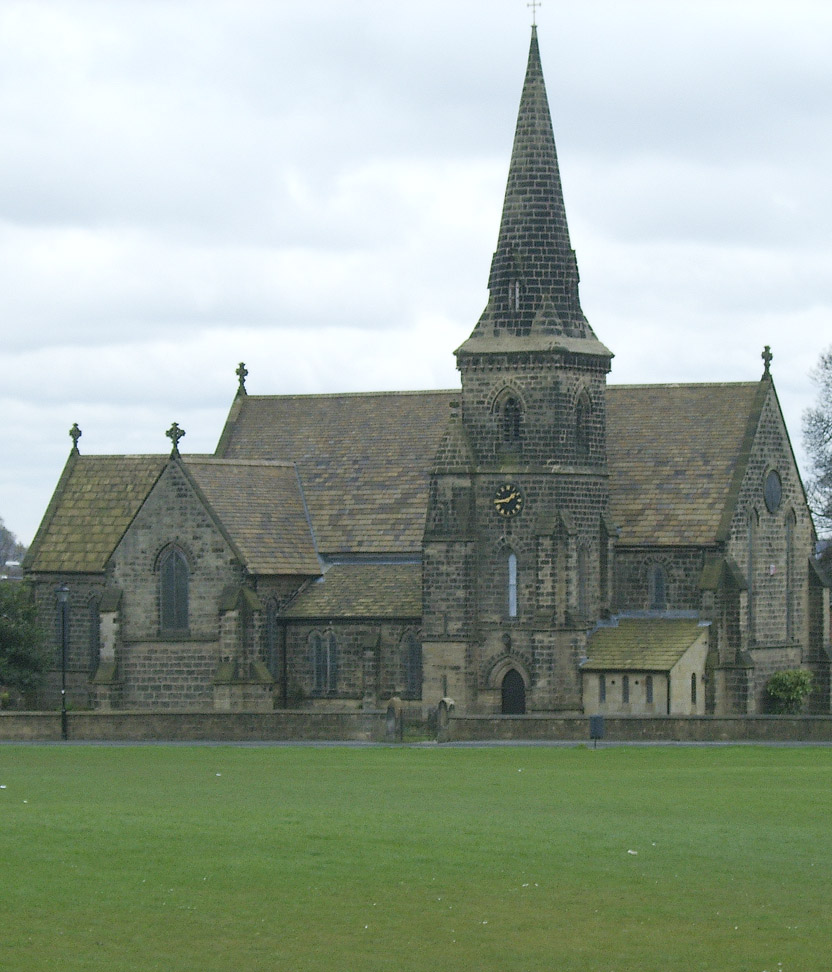
- St James' Church
- OS grid reference: SE 35696 35946
- Location: Seacroft, Leeds
- Country: England
- Denomination: Anglican

History
- Status: Parish church

Architecture
- Architect: T Hellyer
- Architectural type: Gothic Revival
- Groundbreaking: 1845
- Completed: 1846

Administration
- Province: York
- Diocese: Leeds
- Archdeaconry: Leeds
- Parish: Seacroft

The Church of St James in Seacroft, Leeds, West Yorkshire, England is an active Anglican parish church in the archdeaconry of Leeds and the Diocese of Leeds. The church is Grade II listed.

== History ==
The church was built between 1845 and 1846 with later additions made in 1988.

== Architectural style ==
The church is of a Gothic Revival style; having been built to designs by T. Hellyer of dressed stone and a stone tile roof. The church has tall narrow lancets and is tripartite at its east end. There is a gabled porch to the south and a tower to the north built in three stages with its original clock, topped by a stone broach spire. The church has a give bay nave with two bays screened off with a kitchen and toilet added in 1988. The original octagonal font is now situated in the churchyard with a replacement font given in memory of Ann Wilson in 1878.

== See also ==
- List of places of worship in the City of Leeds
