= Seacroft =

Suburb of Leeds, West Yorkshire, England

Coordinates: 53.8222°N 1.4599°W

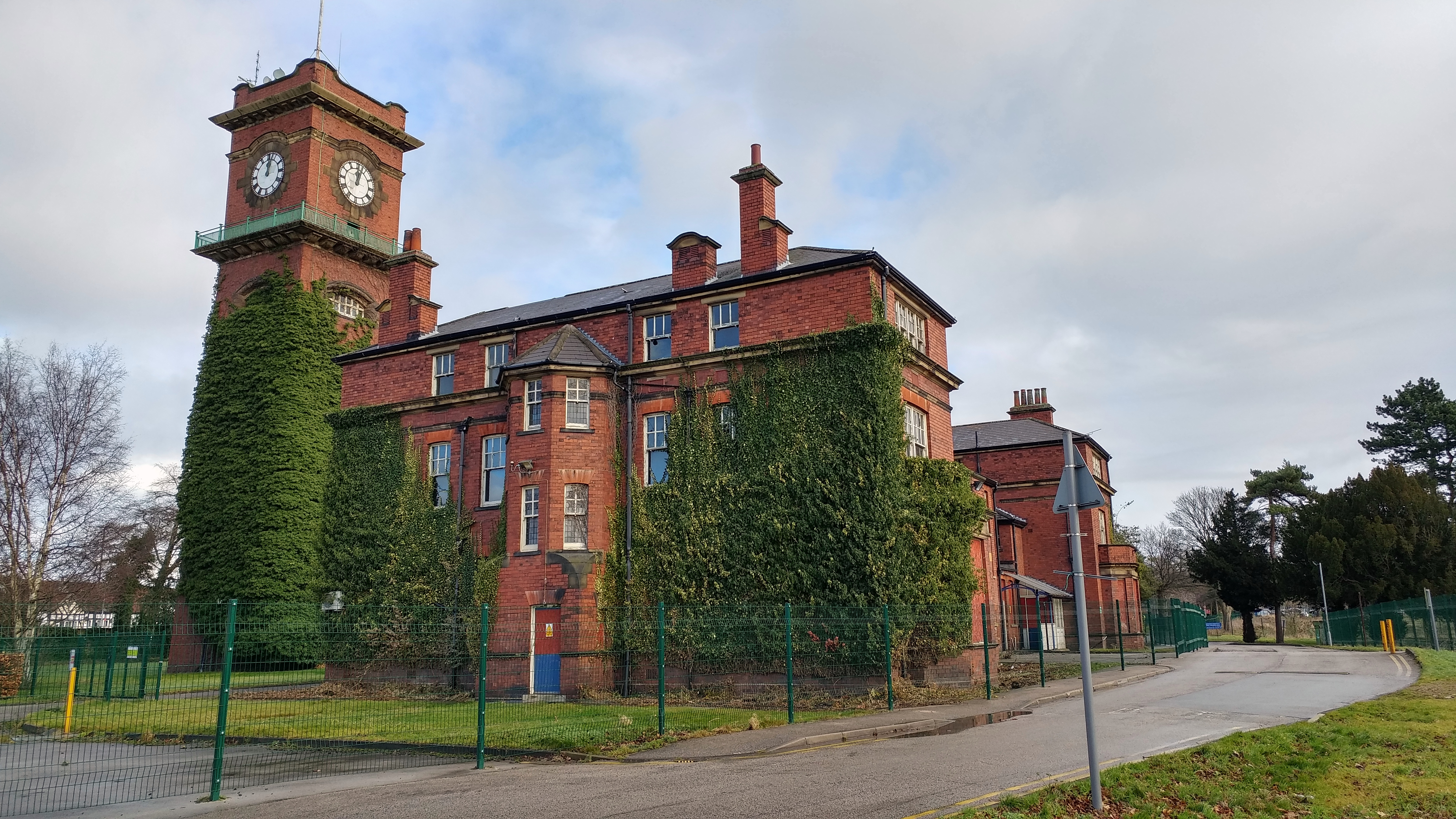
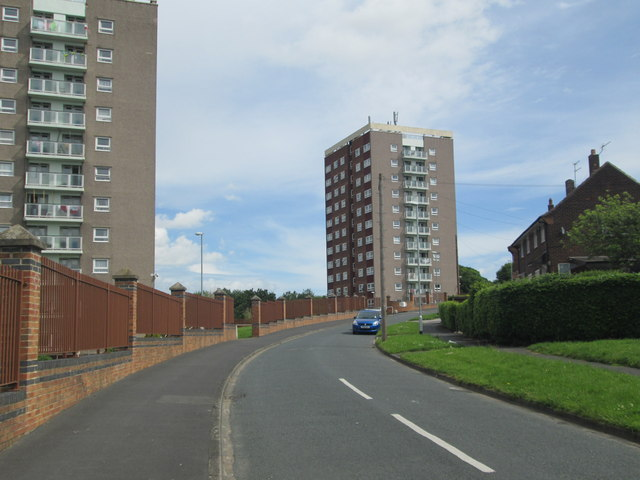
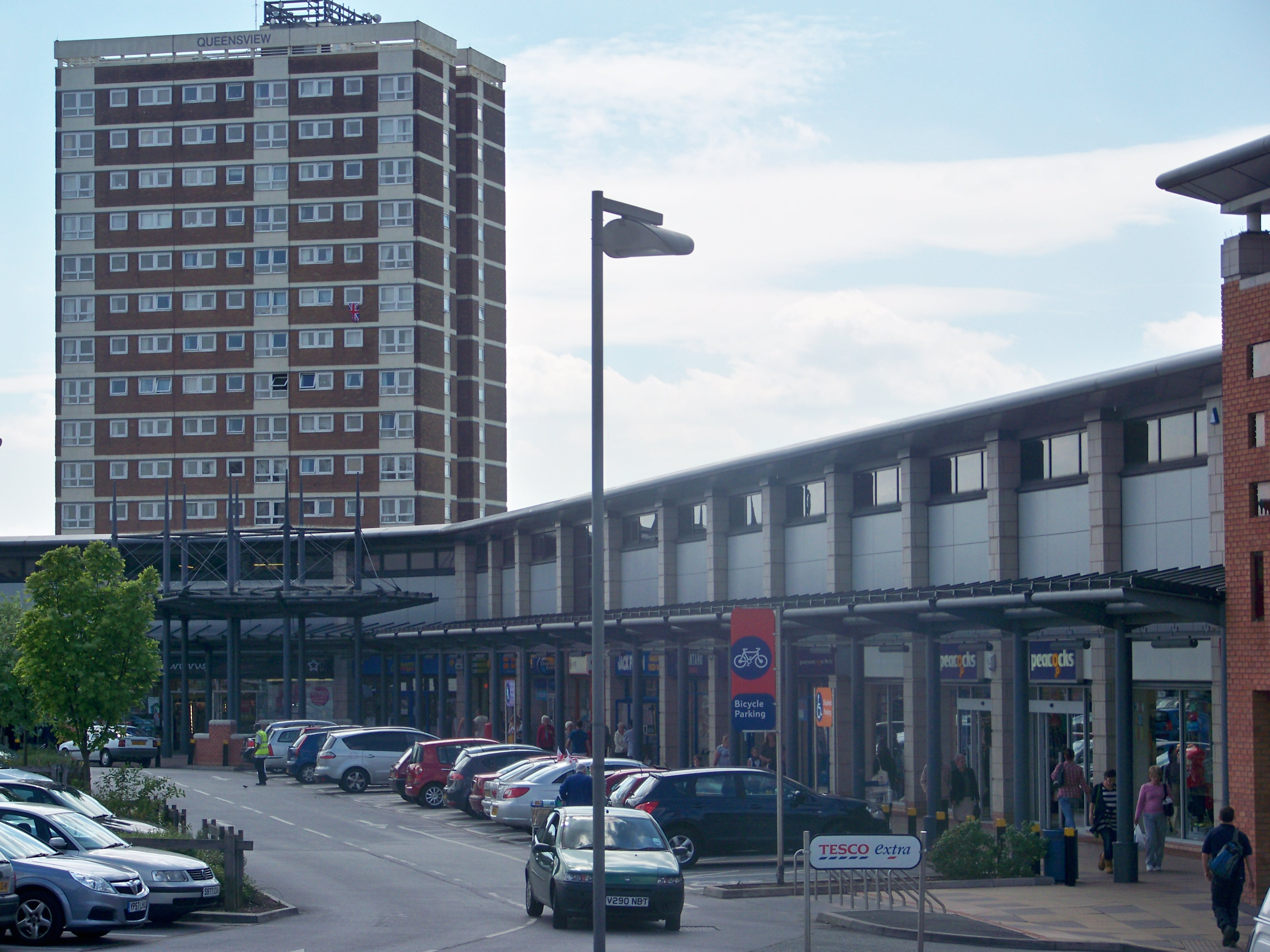
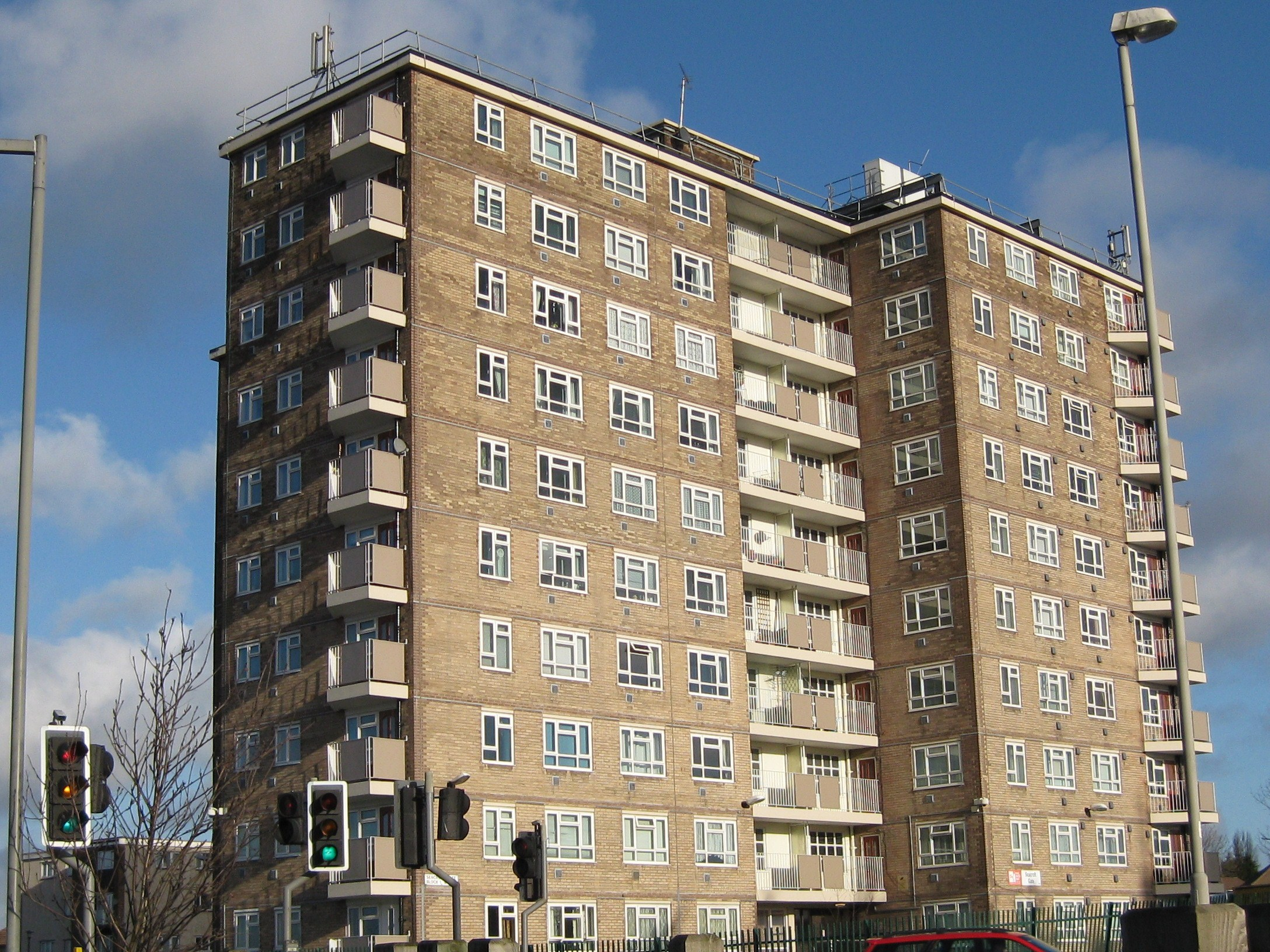
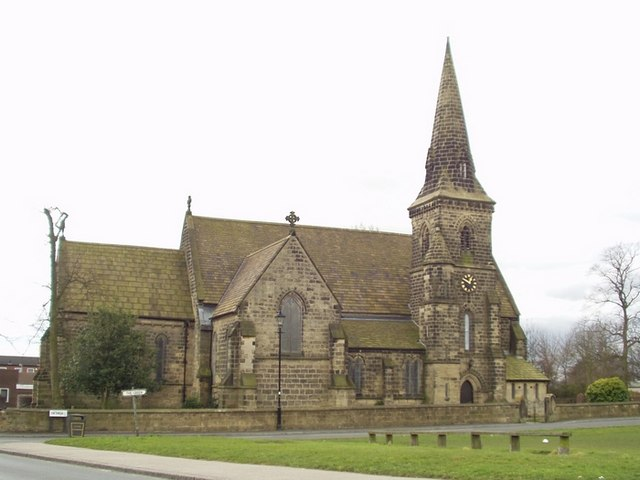
- Seacroft Hospital Barncroft Drive Seacroft Green Shopping Centre Bailey Towers St James' Church

- Location within West Yorkshire
- Population: 14,246 (2011 Census)
- OS grid reference: SE362365
- Metropolitan borough: City of Leeds
- Metropolitan county: West Yorkshire
- Region: Yorkshire and the Humber
- Country: England
- Sovereign state: United Kingdom
- Post town: LEEDS
- Postcode district: LS14
- Dialling code: 0113
- Police: West Yorkshire
- Fire: West Yorkshire
- Ambulance: Yorkshire
- UK Parliament: Leeds East

Seacroft is an outer-city suburb/township consisting mainly of council estate housing covering an extensive area of east Leeds, West Yorkshire, England. It lies in the LS14 Leeds postcode area, around 4 miles (6.4 km) east of Leeds city centre.

It sits in the Killingbeck & Seacroft ward of Leeds City Council and Leeds East parliamentary constituency.

The population of the corresponding Leeds City Ward was nearly 18,000 in 2001 and fell to 14,426 in 2011. The name is often used as a catch-all for Seacroft and the neighbouring areas of Whinmoor and Swarcliffe, other large east Leeds council estates which merge into each other.

Seacroft includes one of the largest council estates in the country and Yorkshire's second-largest council estate, after Bransholme in Kingston upon Hull. The latter, however, was part of Humberside county from 1974 to 1996. Because of its size, Seacroft has often been referred to as a town. The original vision, envisaged by the council, was that it would be a 'Town within the City Limits', and the Seacroft Civic Centre was often referred to as the 'Seacroft Town Centre'.

== Etymology ==
The name Seacroft is first attested in the Domesday Book of 1086, as Sacroft and Sacrofft; the spellings Secroft, Secrofte are attested around 1090 (surviving in a manuscript of 1403). The name comes from the Old English words sǣ ("large body of water") and croft ("enclosure"). Thus the name once meant "enclosure near a pool or marsh".

In vicinity of Seacroft was once found the field-name Chetwde, attested in 1341, which is unusual among English names for deriving partly from Common Brittonic: its first element is the word found today in modern Welsh as coed ("woodland"). The second element, added after Brittonic ceased to be understood in the region is the English word wood, making the name tautological in meaning.

== The Green ==
Seacroft was at one time a small village between Leeds and York. The village green, known as "The Green" still exists, and is one of the oldest in the country. It has the Cricketers Arms pub on the north side and St James parish church (built 1845, architect T. Hellyer) on the south side. John Wesley preached on The Green, and as a result a Wesleyan Chapel (Methodist Church) was built close by. Seacroft Green has an active residents' association.

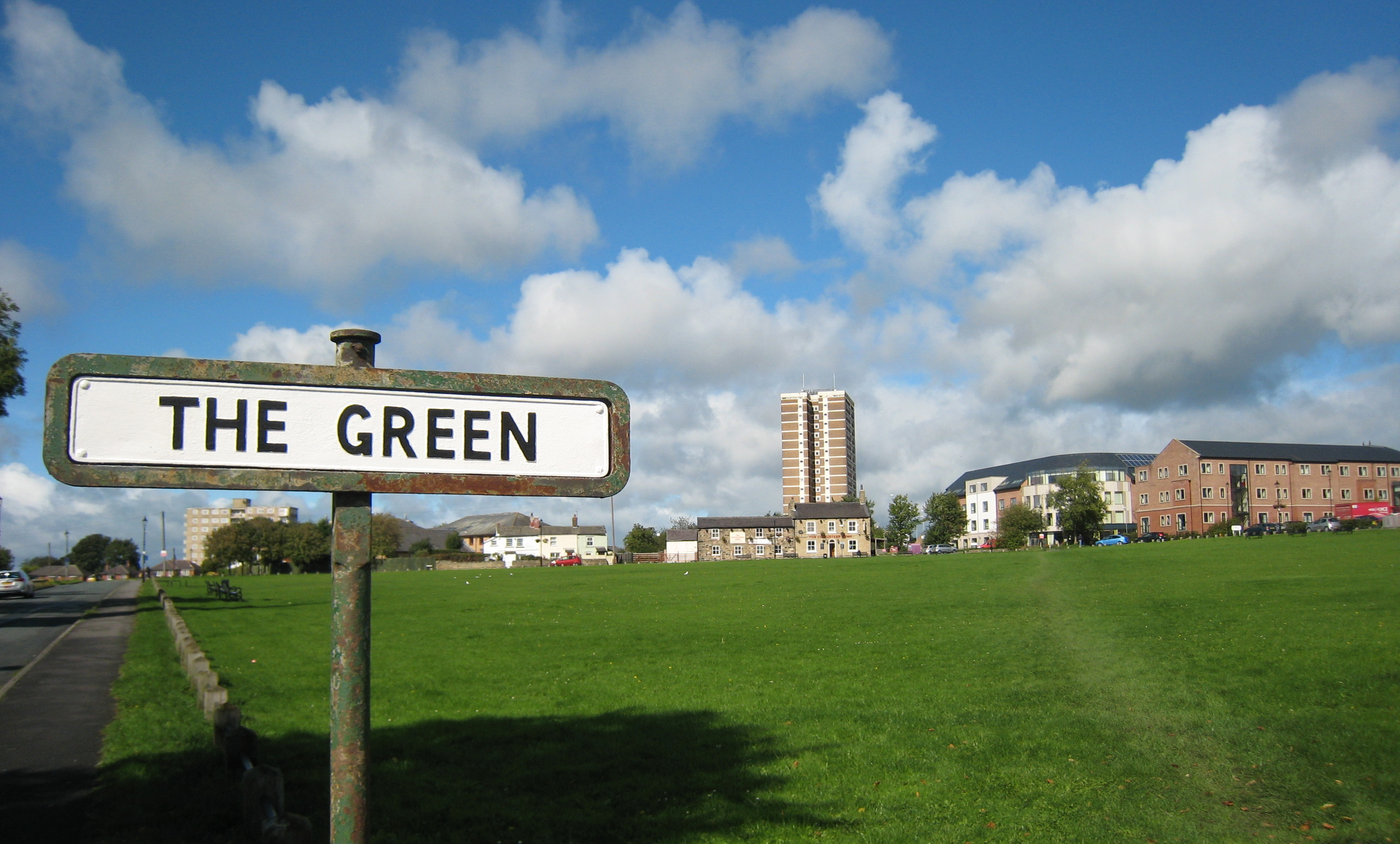
The Green

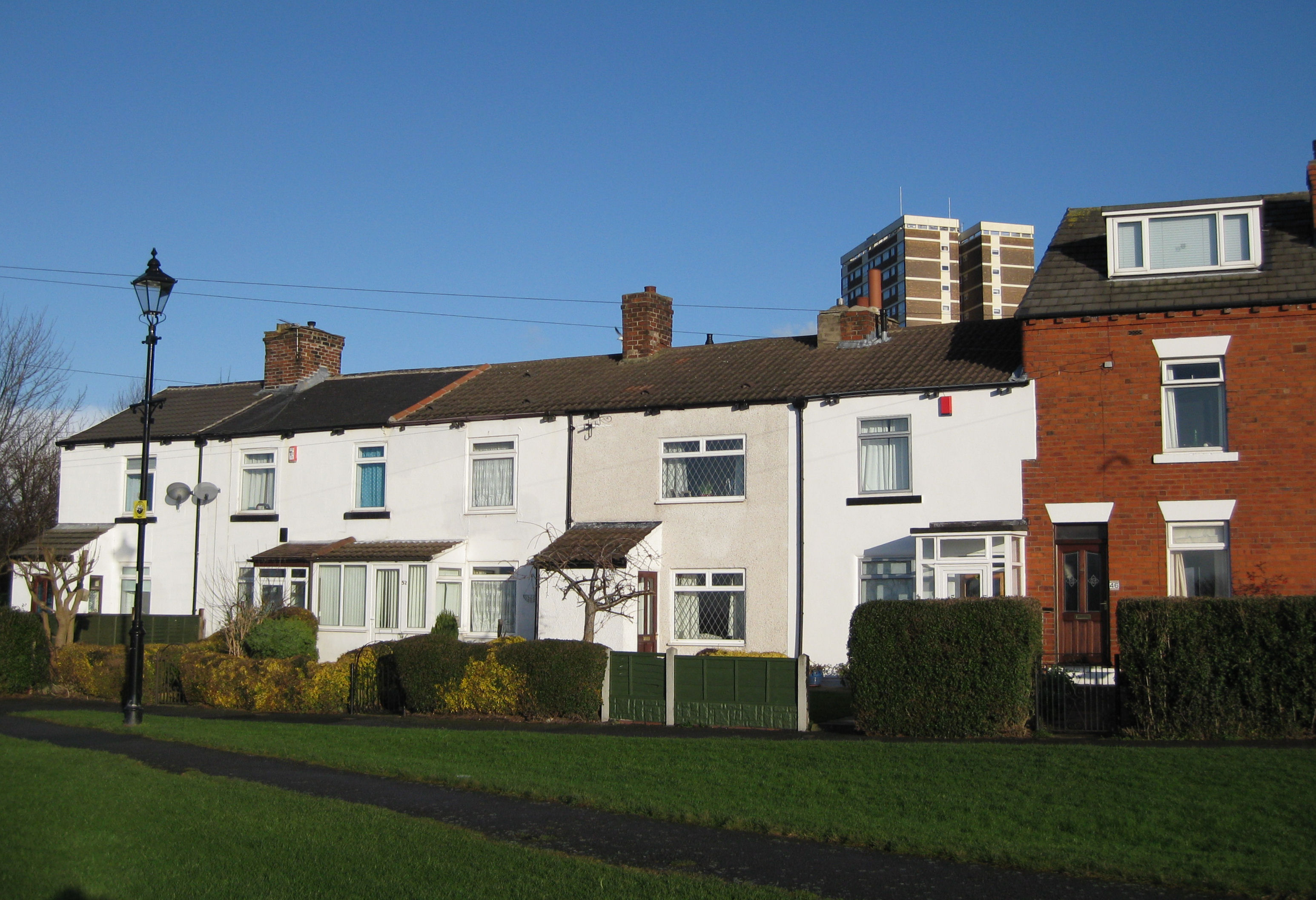
Houses on The Green

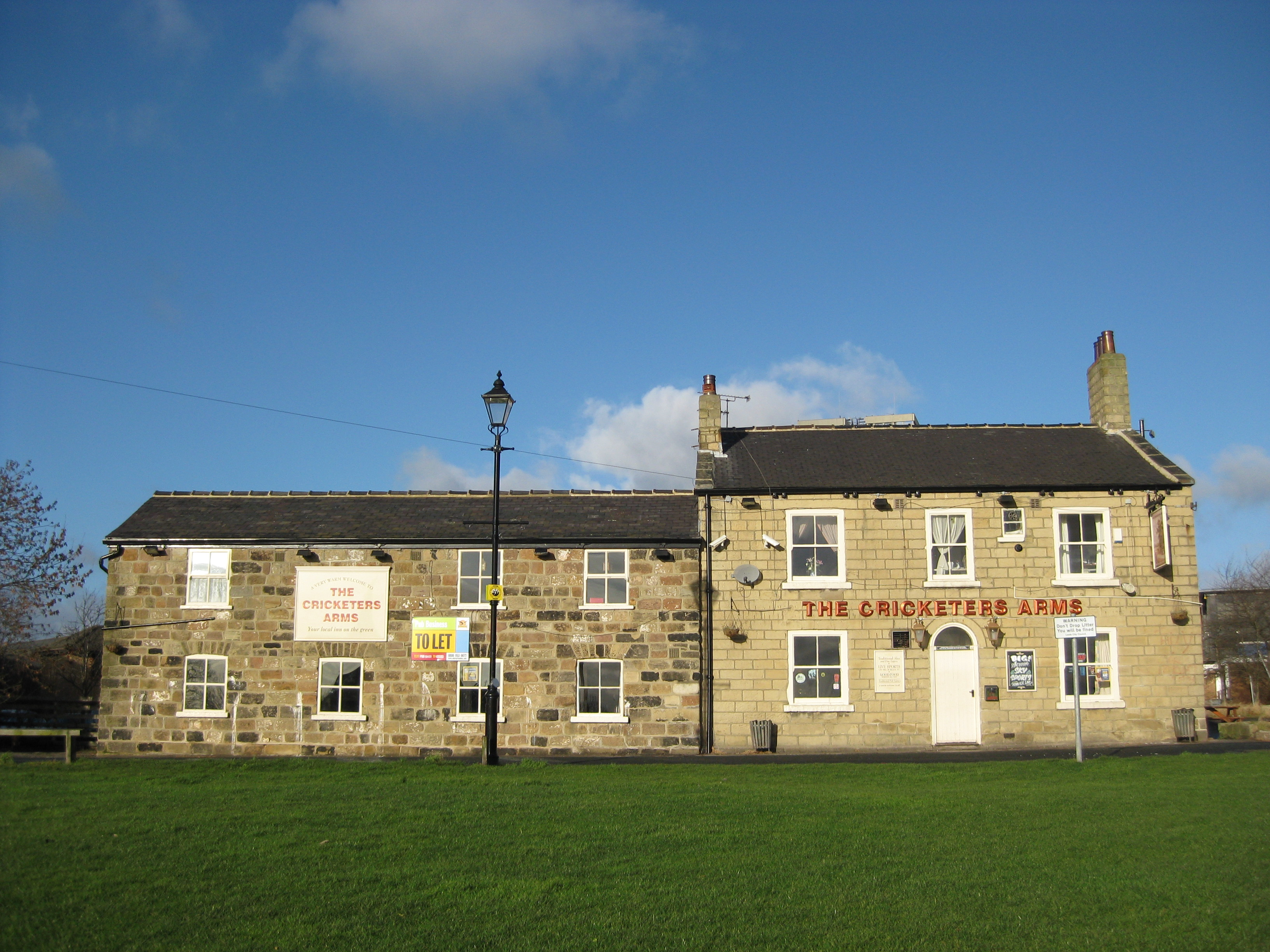
The Cricketers Arms, The Green

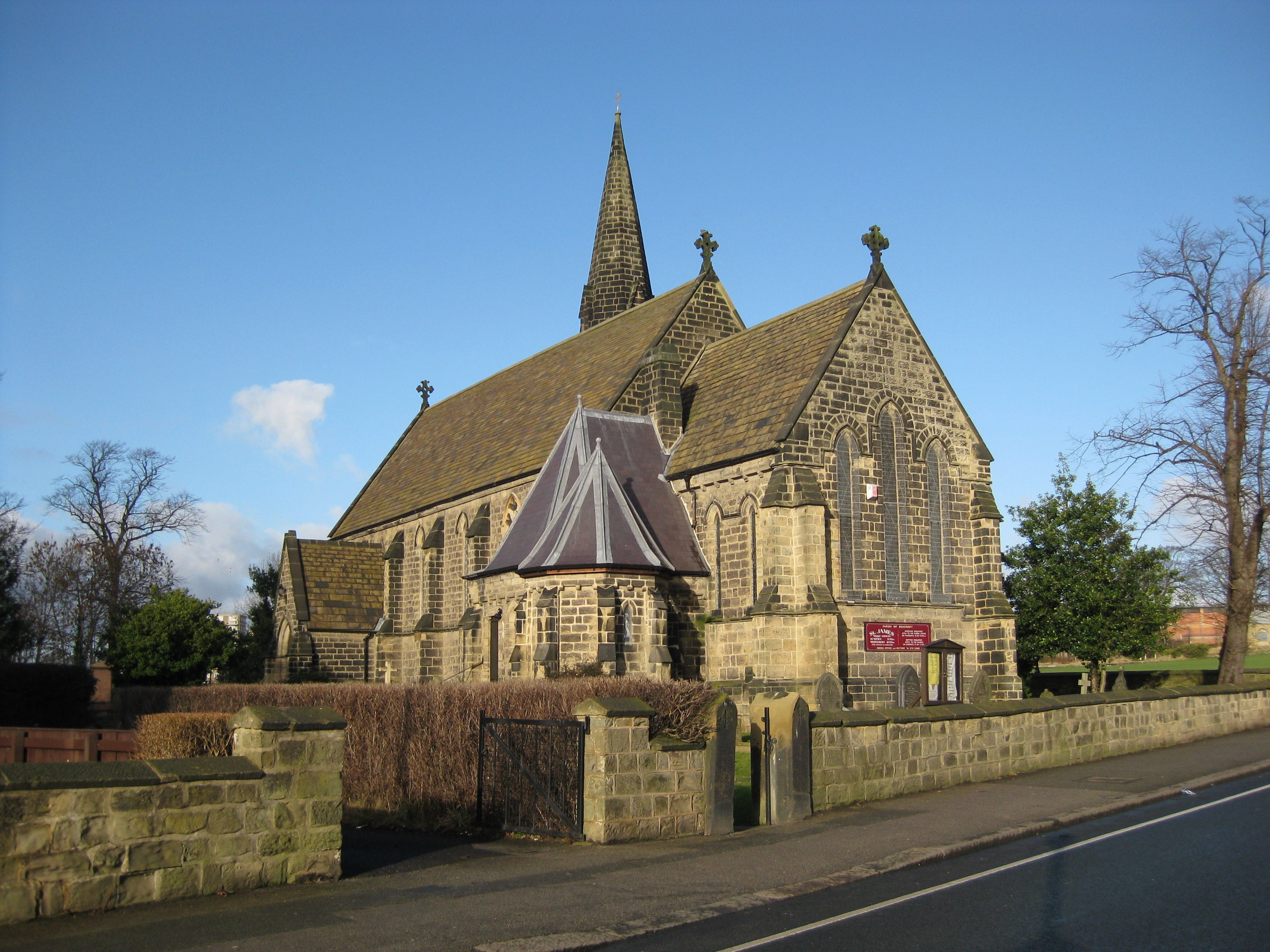
St James's Parish Church (C of E), The Green (1845)

== History ==
=== Seacroft village ===
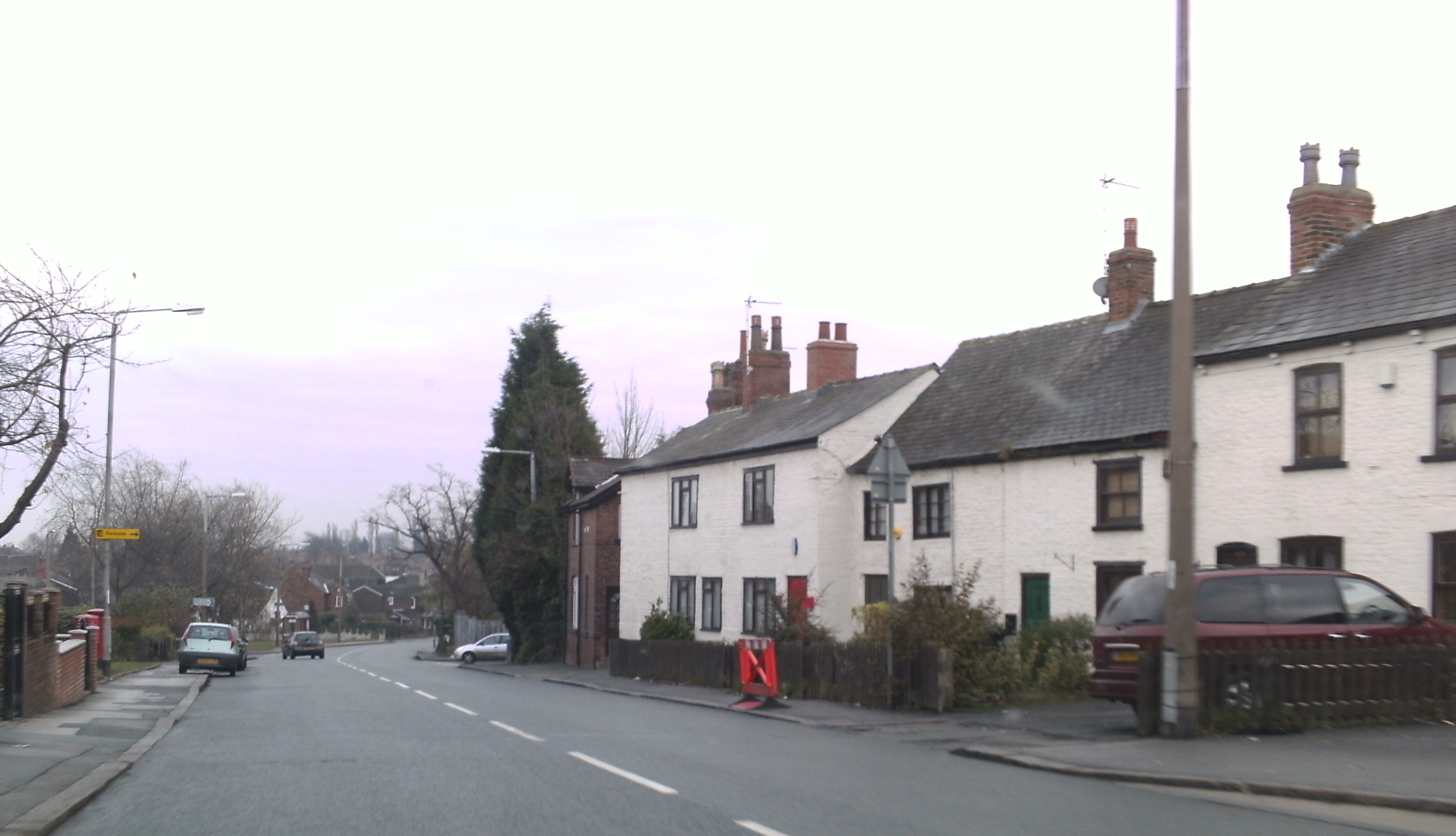
Areas of the original Seacroft village

Seacroft village is mentioned in the Domesday Book (1086). Evidence of much earlier inhabitation was found during construction of the estate in the 1950s. A stone axe dating from the Neolithic age (3500–2100 BC) was found on Kentmere Avenue. In addition, two silver Roman coins were found on The Green in the 1850s.

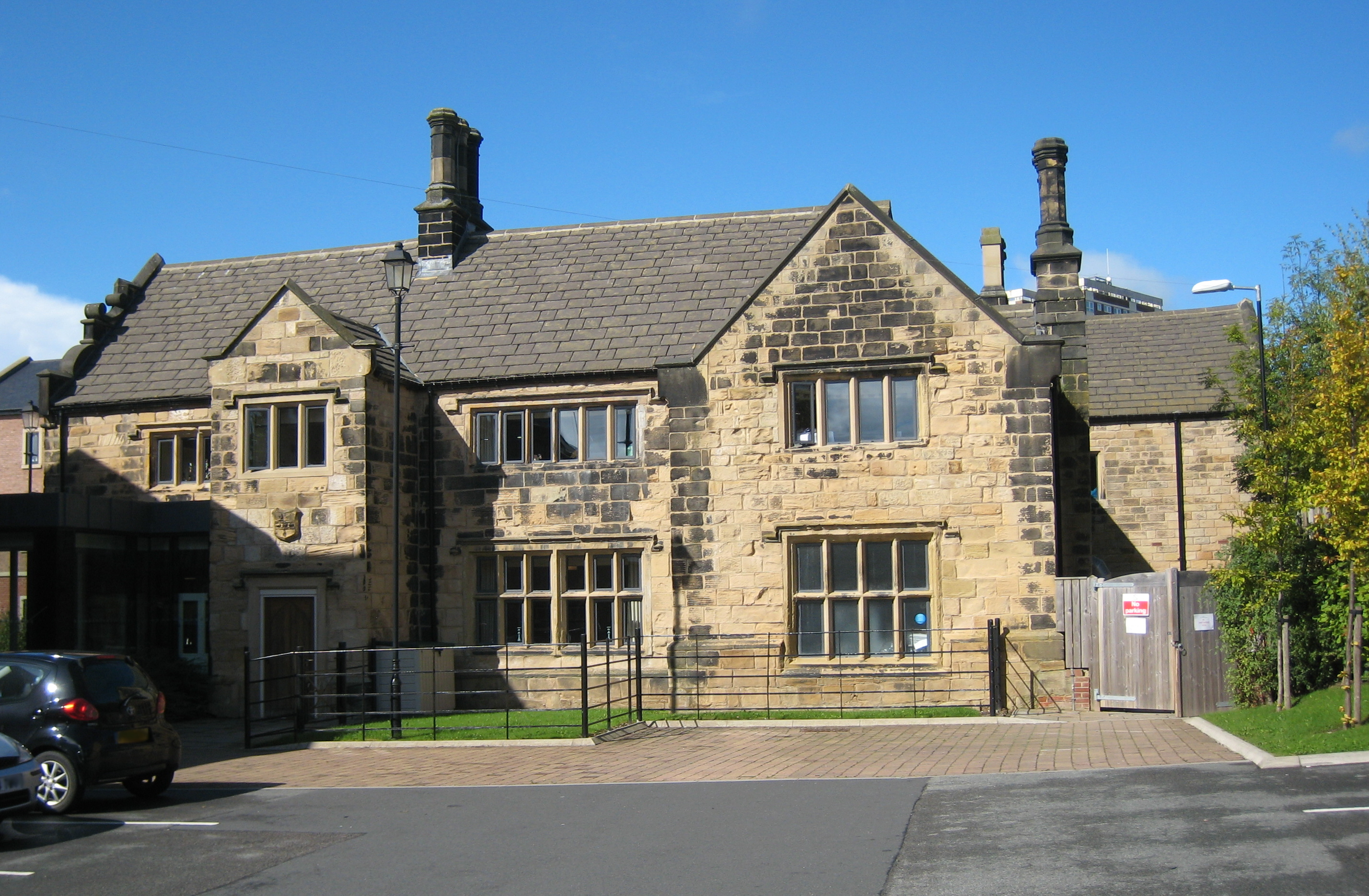
Seacroft Grange in 2017

Seacroft village is the original part of Seacroft, around The Green and Cricketers Arms (pictured above), and is often referred to today. Seacroft Hall was built in the 17th century by the Shiletto family incorporating extensive landscaping and parkland. Despite being a listed building, the hall was demolished in the 1950s. The original entrance lodge still stands on York Road, with Parklands School on South Parkway now occupying the location of the hall. There is one shop in the area that was originally Seacroft Village, a small village off licence, which has been built since the building of the estate.

Seacroft Grange was built in 1627 for the Tottie family and is also known as Tottie Hall. It is a grade II listed building, along with its service buildings. Although the English Heritage record says it was rebuilt in 1837 other sources record the building as original, noting that in 1837 the new tenant John Wilson renamed it to Seacroft Grange and set his coat of arms over the door. The building included a celebrated late 17th century staircase thought to have been brought from Austhorpe Hall. It is now part of Seacroft Grange Care Village.

See also The Seacroft Village Preservation Society.

There is an old non-operating windmill, that pre-dates the estate, which has been incorporated into a hotel (now known as the Britannia Hotel Leeds).

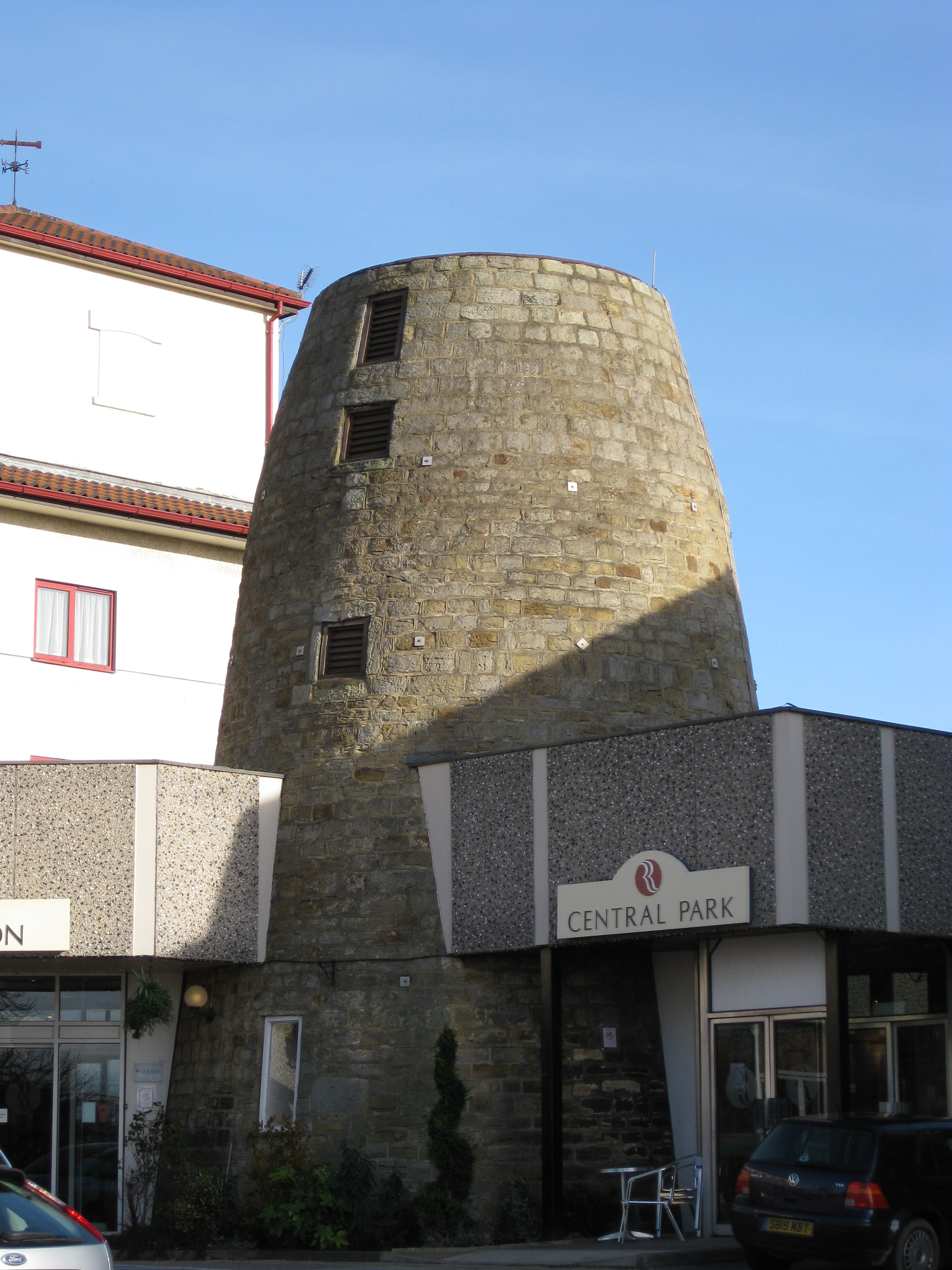
Seacroft Windmill

=== Satellite town within the city boundary ===
The village developed slowly over the centuries and saw very little change until the post-war years. Work on the estate began in the 1950s. Many of the older houses on the estate are more traditional red-brick semis built around the Beechwood area, to the North of the estate. In the 1960s many prefabricated houses and high-rise flats were constructed on the estate. Two main roads were built through the estate, these being North Parkway and South Parkway. North Parkway was built with a dual carriageway, in a similar way as Oak Tree Drive, Coldcotes Drive and Gipton Approach in neighbouring Gipton.

In 1934, Leeds City Council bought 1,000 acres (4.0 km^{2}) for municipal housing, and after World War II the majority of houses and blocks of flats were built. The council had planned for Seacroft to be a "satellite town within the city boundary"

In addition to this vision, other areas surrounding Seacroft were built using the same principle. In the 1960s building work in the Swarcliffe and Stanks areas started, and in the 1970s in Whinmoor. However, none of these were as large or ambitious as Seacroft, with the intention that these areas use many of the amenities built along with the Seacroft Estate such as the Civic Centre and Seacroft's secondary schools. As such amenities were kept to a minimum in Swarcliffe and Whinmoor, with the estates only having small local shops, public houses and primary schools. Seacroft also has the main central bus interchange for North East Leeds, although the nearest railway station is in Cross Gates.

=== Seacroft Civic Centre ===
The former Seacroft Civic Centre in 1967

The 1960s also saw the construction of the Seacroft Civic Centre, which was at the time a novel way of building an outdoor purpose built town centre. The Civic Centre had a Grandways supermarket and a Woolworths as well as many other smaller shops, banks, pubs and a library. In the 1990s it had become apparent that the condition of the Civic Centre had deteriorated significantly in the 30 years since its construction. Talks were held with Leeds City Council, and Tesco were found as the preferred bidder to rebuild the Seacroft Civic Centre.

=== Seacroft Green Shopping Centre ===
In 1999, work began clearing the site and in 2000 the new Seacroft Green Shopping Centre opened. The Tesco supermarket was cited at the time to be the largest in Europe, a claim which may not have been true. It is, however, still an enormous supermarket spread over two levels (the second being a large mezzanine level, which was built a few years after the Tesco store had opened to give more space within the store). The car park was also enlarged and other shop units were built along the side of the supermarket, making the centre a crescent shape. The huge supermarket as well as the other shops promised to create hundreds more jobs then would be lost through the loss of trade in the Civic Centre, which among other factors made the redevelopment favourable with many Seacroft residents.

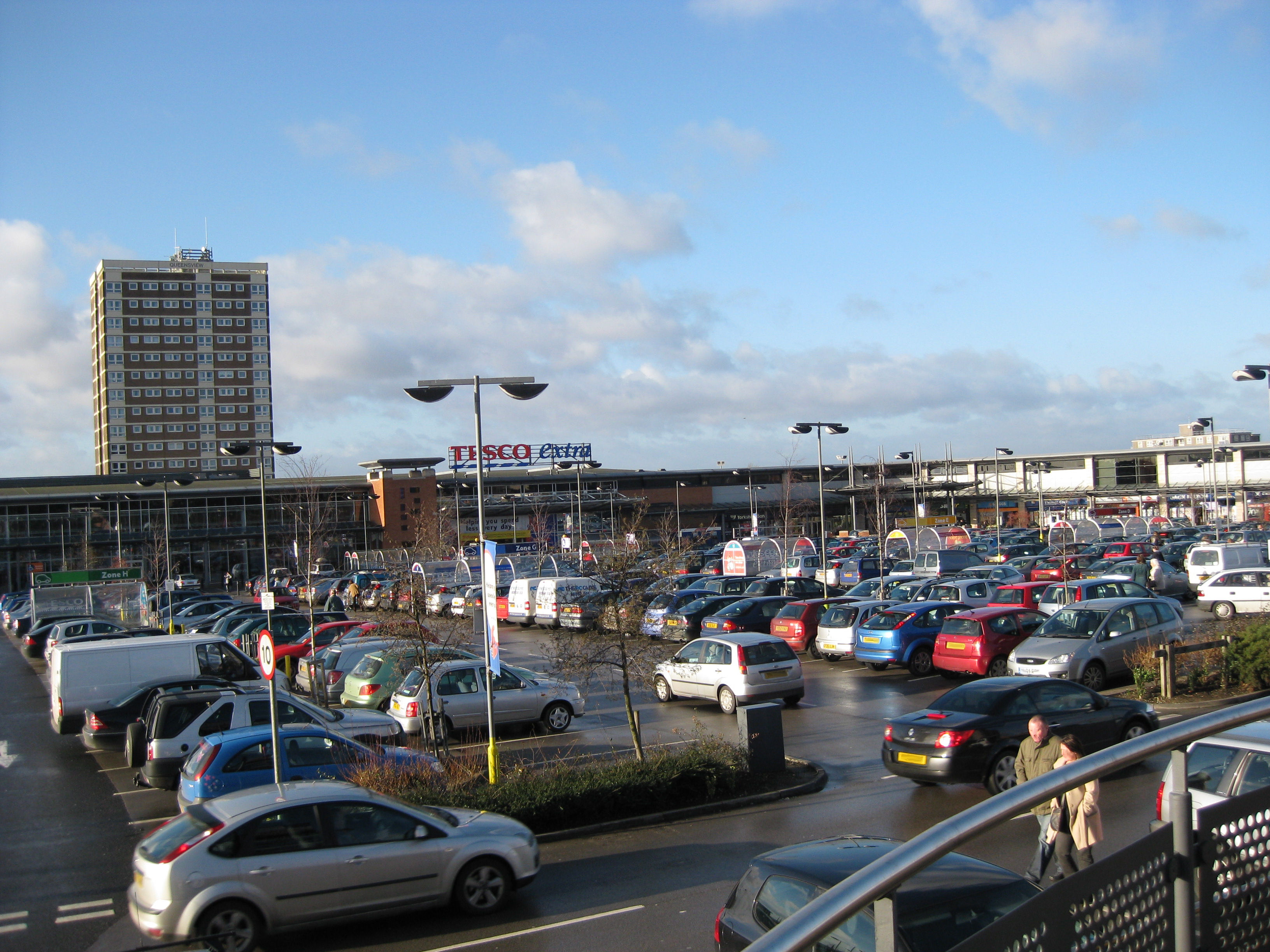
Tesco at The Seacroft Green Shopping Centre

The Seacroft Green Shopping Centre is also the main transport interchange in Seacroft, with the main bus station for Seacroft and the surrounding areas being centred there. From here buses run out through the estate as well as to the city centre, Wetherby and Harrogate. Seacroft bus station has five stands and an average daily footfall of 2,687. (See Transport)

The centre was not entirely popular with many local residents who said they had lost their town centre to a Tesco supermarket and to an extent, this may be true. Although there are shops besides Tesco, they are far fewer than there were, the precinct area has been lost, the pubs in the centre have been lost, and there are no offices. Until the building of the new centre, and since the closure of Grandways, it was said that Seacroft suffered from 'food poverty' and fresh produce could not be bought on the estate. This was probably not true as there was a Co-op (now McColls in 2018) on South Parkway.

The rebuilding of the Civic Centre did not alter the deprivation on the estate. Throughout the 2000s (decade), the condition of many of the houses on the estate deteriorated, particularly amongst the prefabricated housing to the South West of the estate. Many houses were vacated and either their condition or lack of demand dictated that the council boarded them up. The estate's high rise flats are seen as a refuge as they are harder to break into and in better condition than the houses, as such they have largely been allocated to older residents. Some (including Queensview) have become sheltered housing.

=== Amenities elsewhere ===
Regular bus services allow residents to use amenities in Leeds city centre, Cross Gates and Wetherby. The Cross Gates Centre (formerly Arndale Centre) provides many high street shops which Seacroft lacks, while Wetherby's many pubs make it an alternative destination for evening entertainment.

== Architecture ==
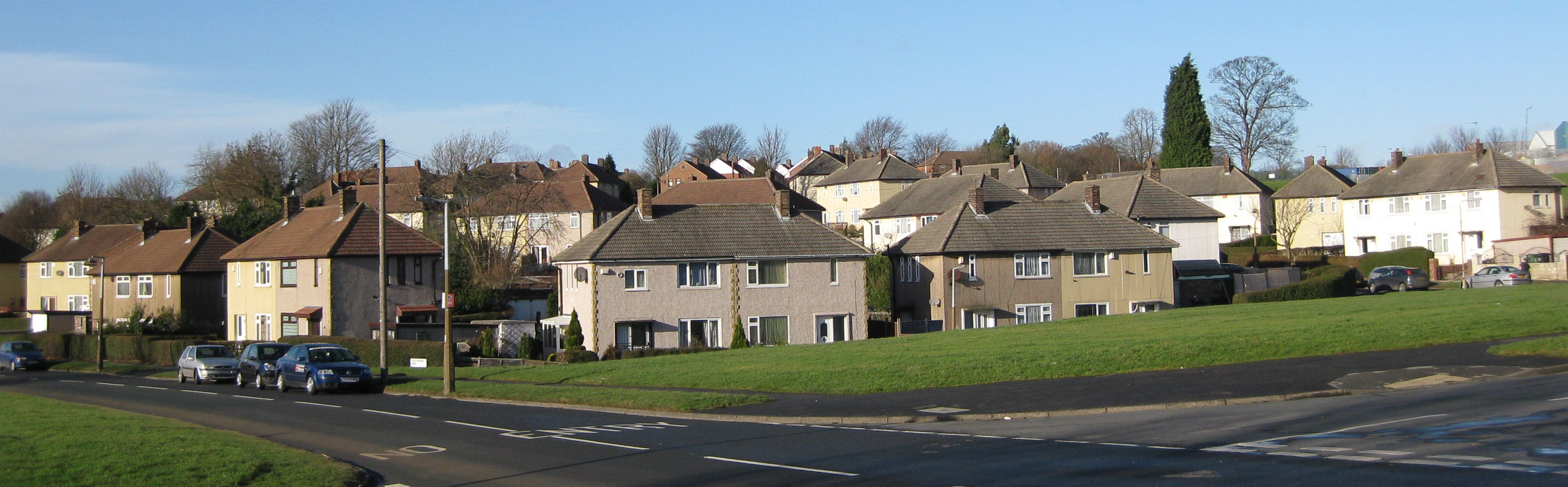
Concrete Council-built houses on North Parkway

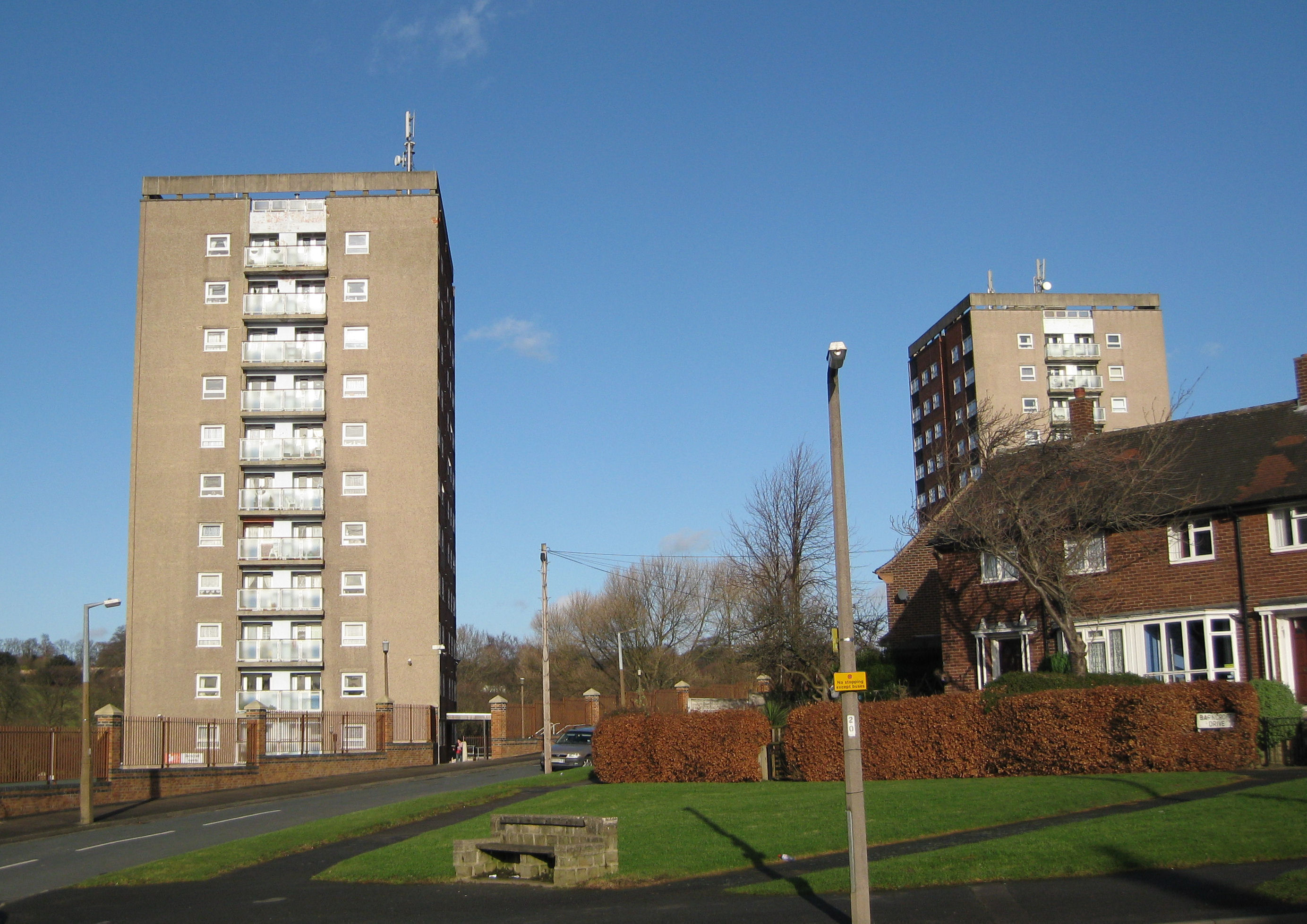
High rise flats and brick semis

Seacroft has a variety of styles of architecture. The area surrounding the green has many old buildings, dating back to the 18th century and before. The estate also shows a variety of different styles employed by Leeds City Council for the duration of the estate's construction. The earlier houses dating back to the 1950s are red brick traditional terraces and semis. In the late 1960s and 1970s prefabricated housing was built towards the South West of the estate. The build quality of these houses was notably poor and many have now been demolished to be replaced with modern housing . The older council houses were generally built to a higher quality and are still in good condition. The brutalist Seacroft Civic Centre stood until its demolition in 1999, when it was replaced by the Seacroft Green Shopping Centre, which is of a fairly standard design for a large supermarket and purpose-built shops. There are also many high-rise blocks of flats around the estate, mainly near the Shopping Centre, towards the bottom of South Parkway and Beechwood Avenue, around the Ramshead area and in the Bogart Hill area. Starting in 2018, many new houses are being built on the eastern end of South Parkway.

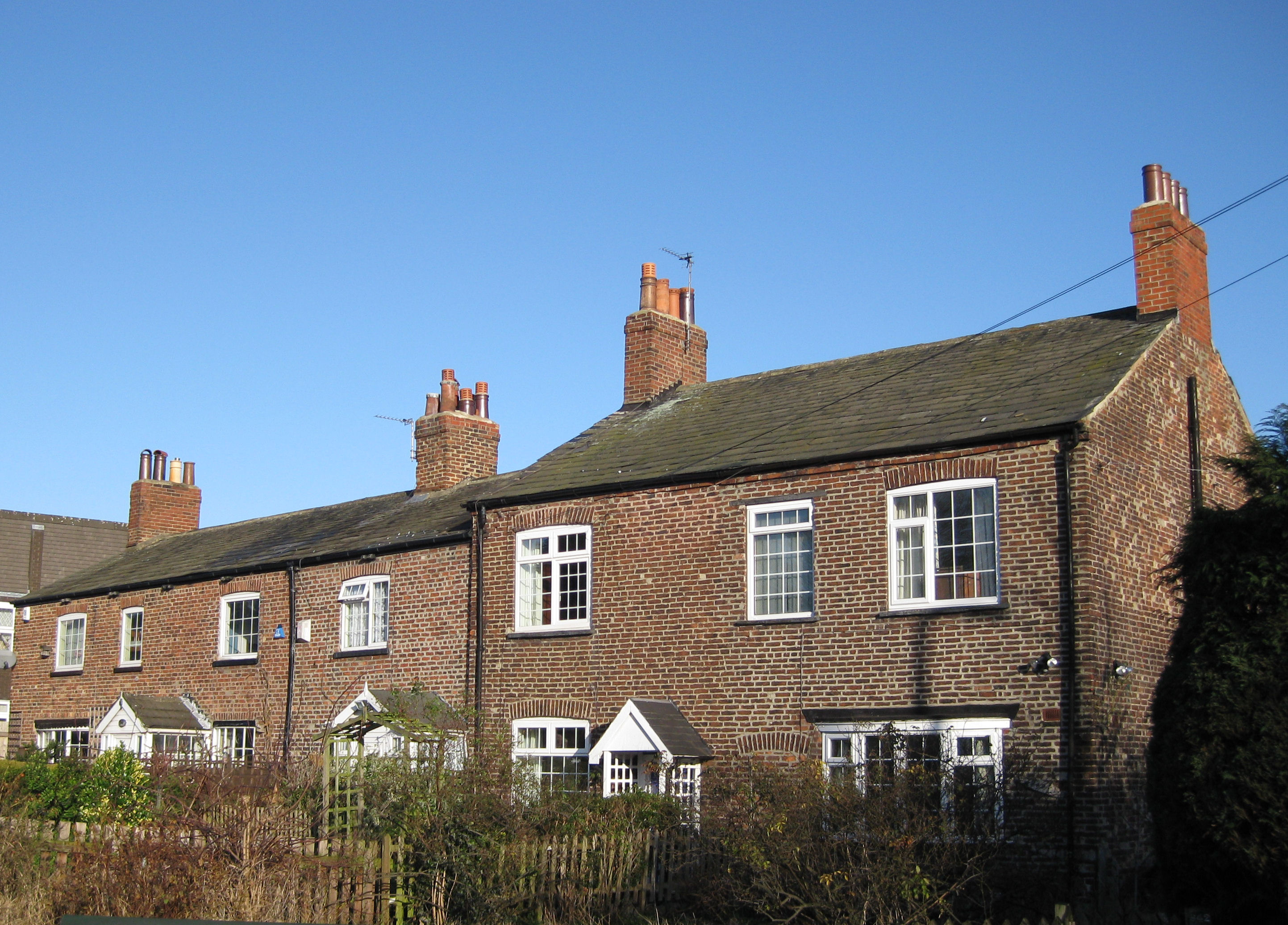
Older housing, York Road, Seacroft Village

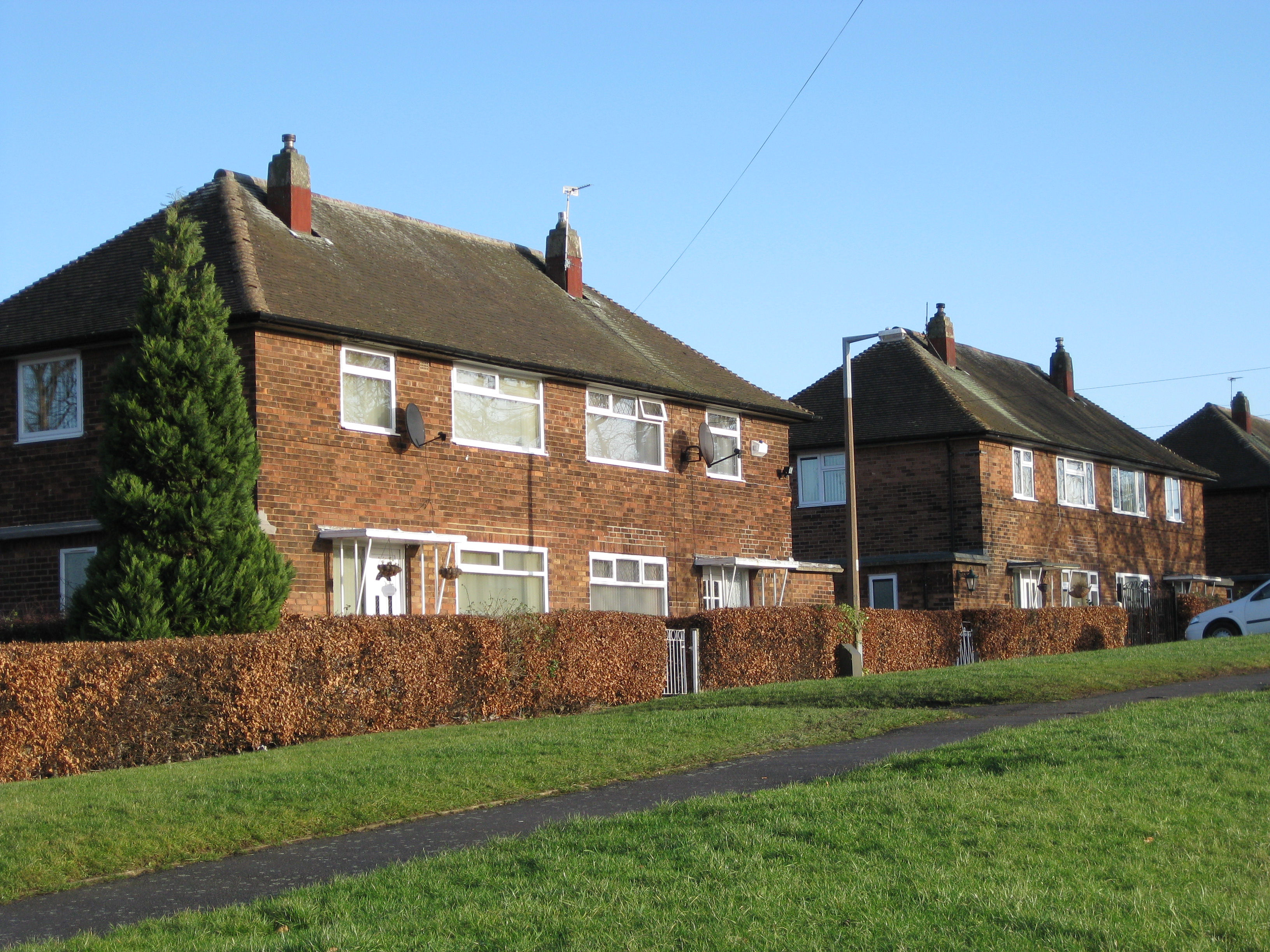
1950s semi-detached Council Housing

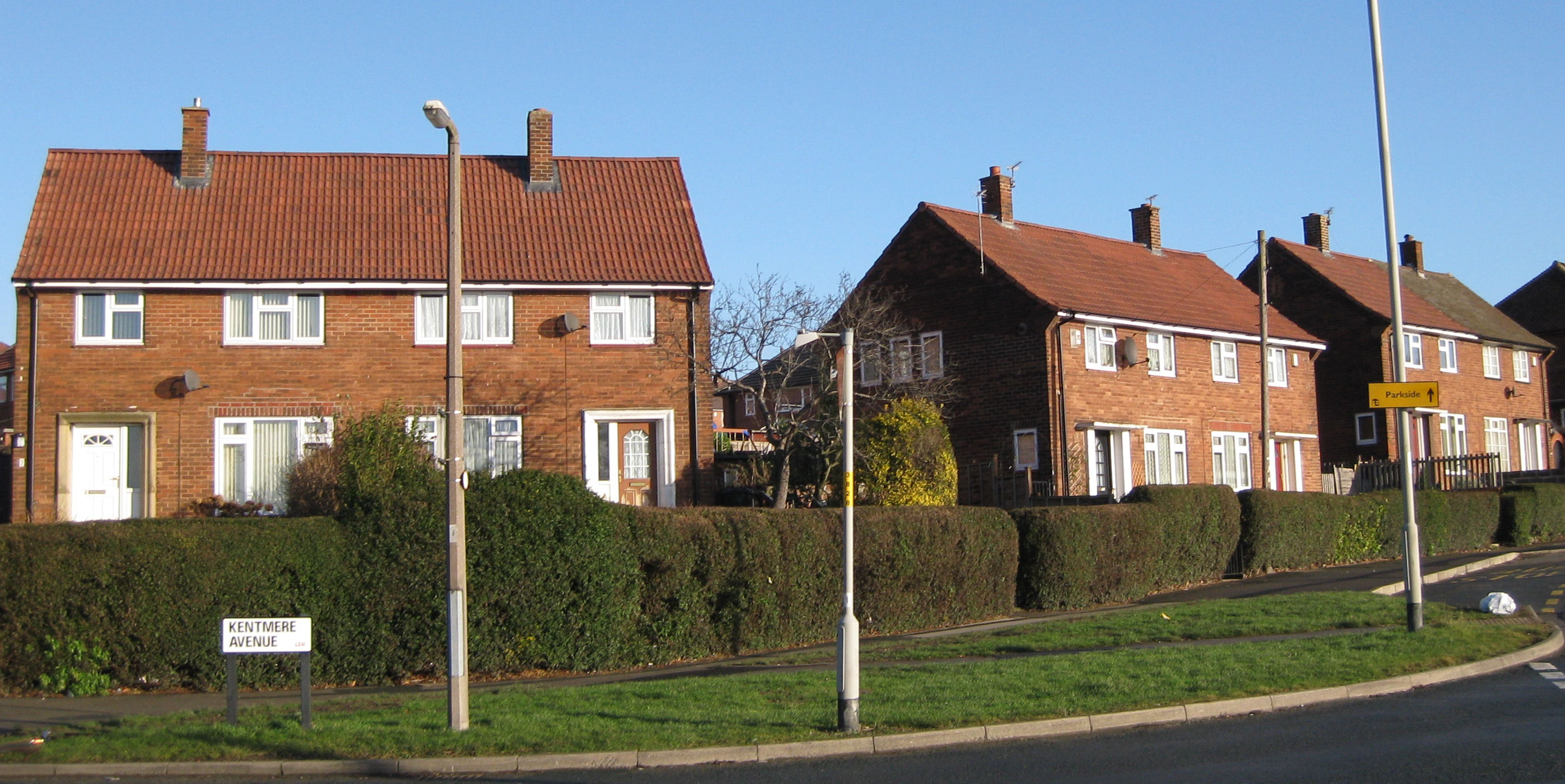
Later semi-detached houses

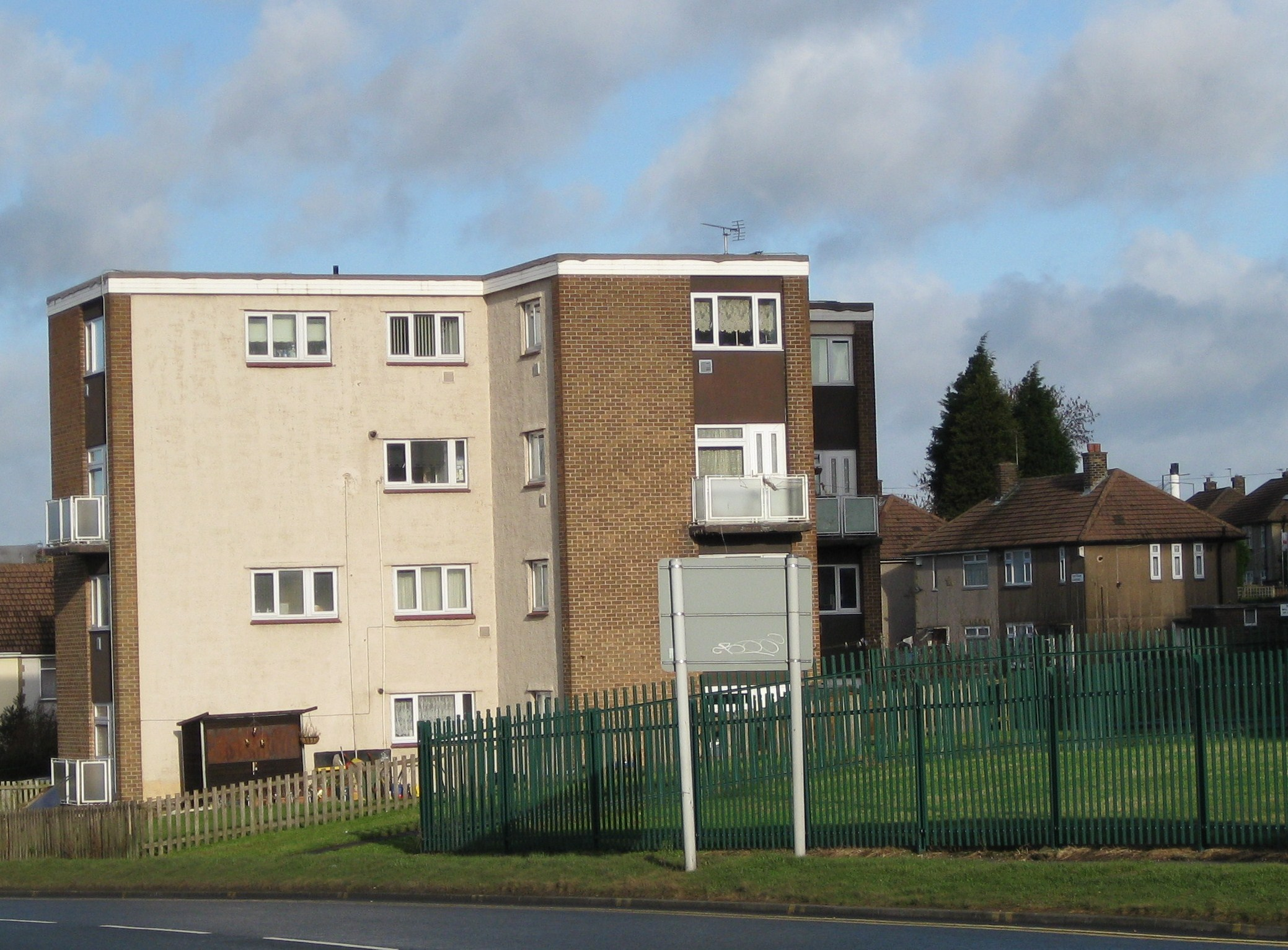
Low-rise flats

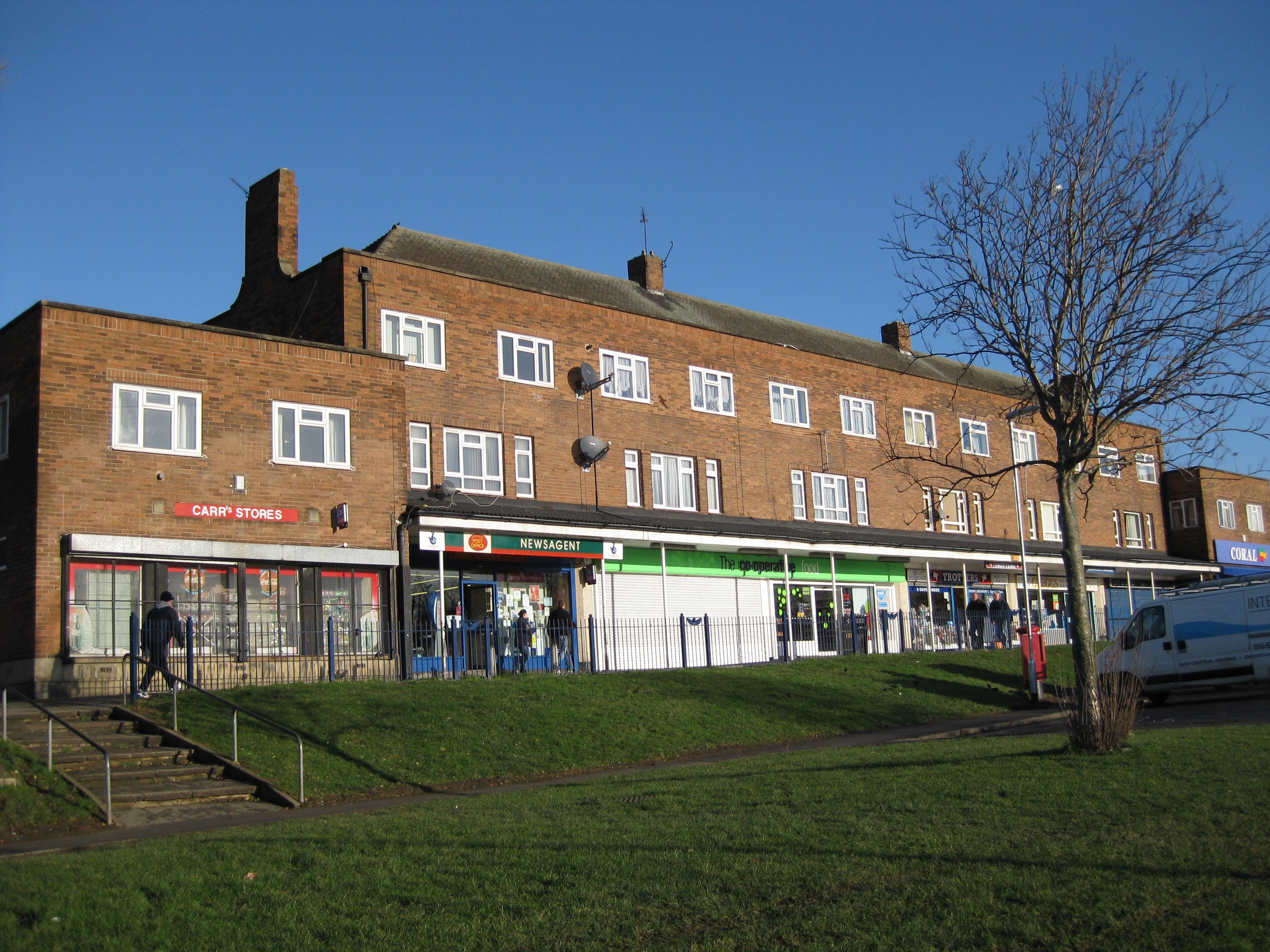
Shops on the South Parkway

Religious buildings include the stone-built St James's Parish Church (C of E, 1845), a brick Wesleyan Chapel (1874), a brick Congregational Church (1951, badly damaged in an arson attack in 2015, leading to its demolition in 2017) and a brick Roman Catholic Church, Our Lady of Good Counsel (1954).

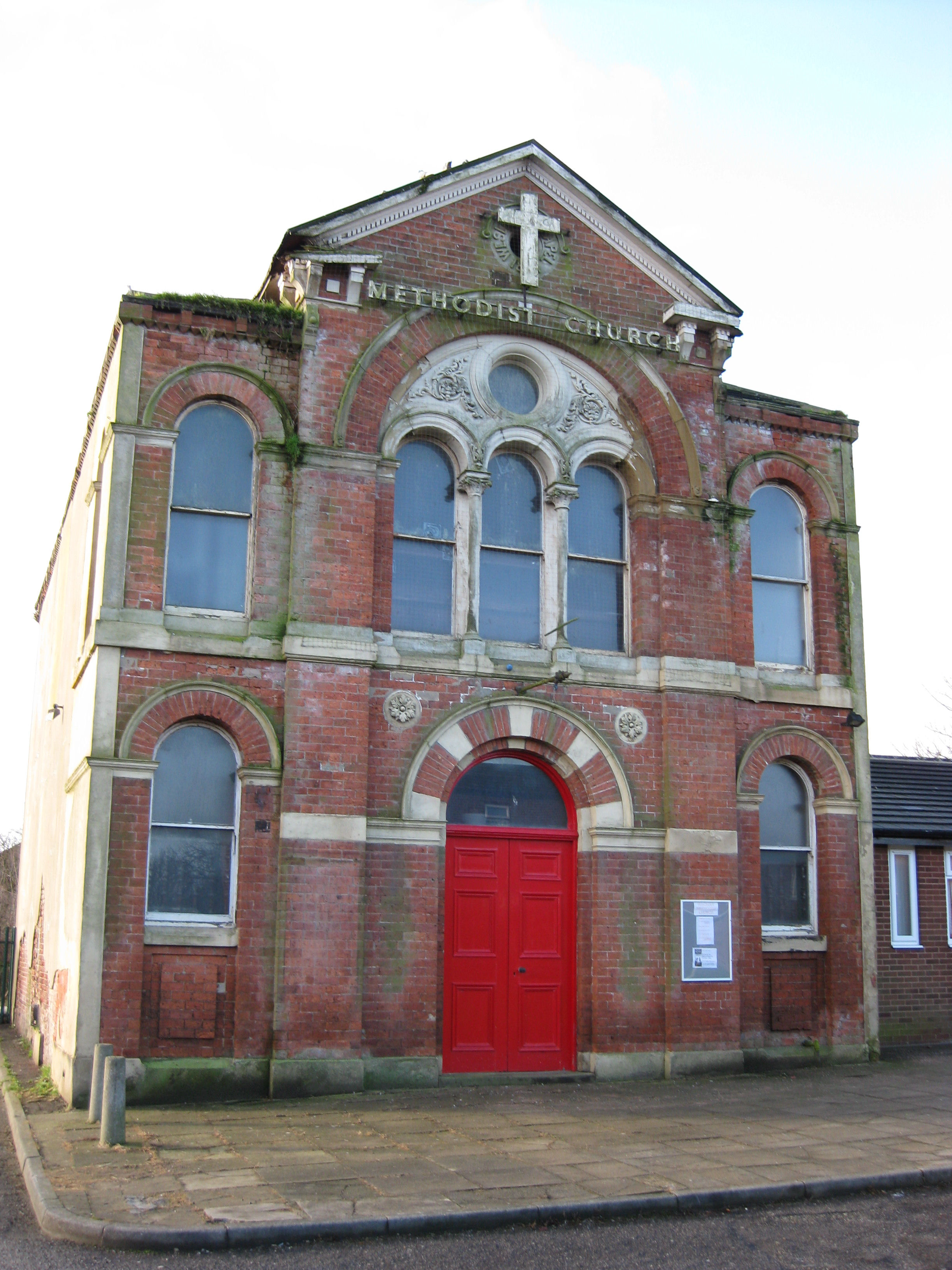
Methodist Church (Wesleyan Chapel) (1874), now Chapel FM Arts Centre (2014–present)

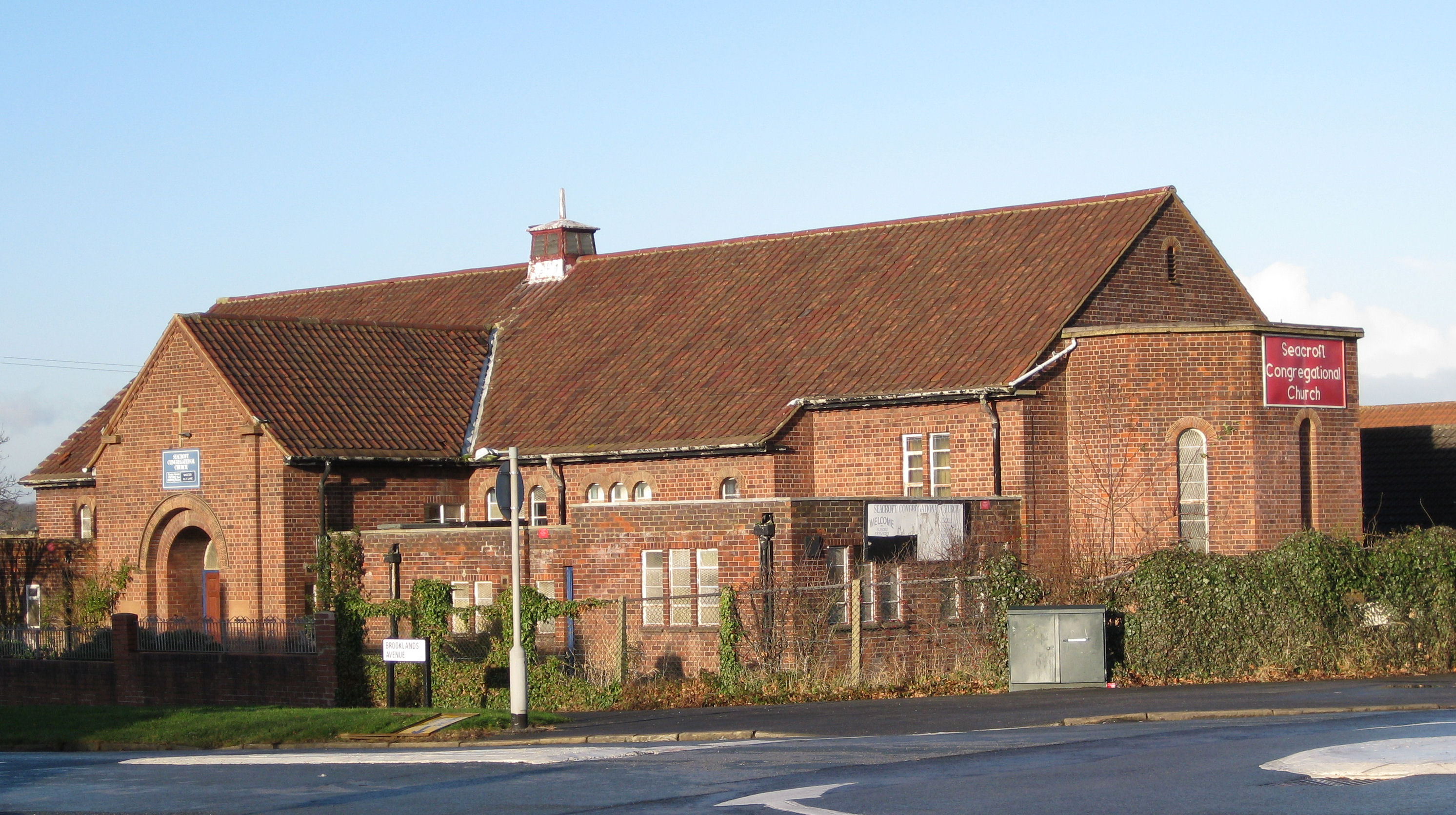
Seacroft Congregational Church (1951) Demolished in 2017

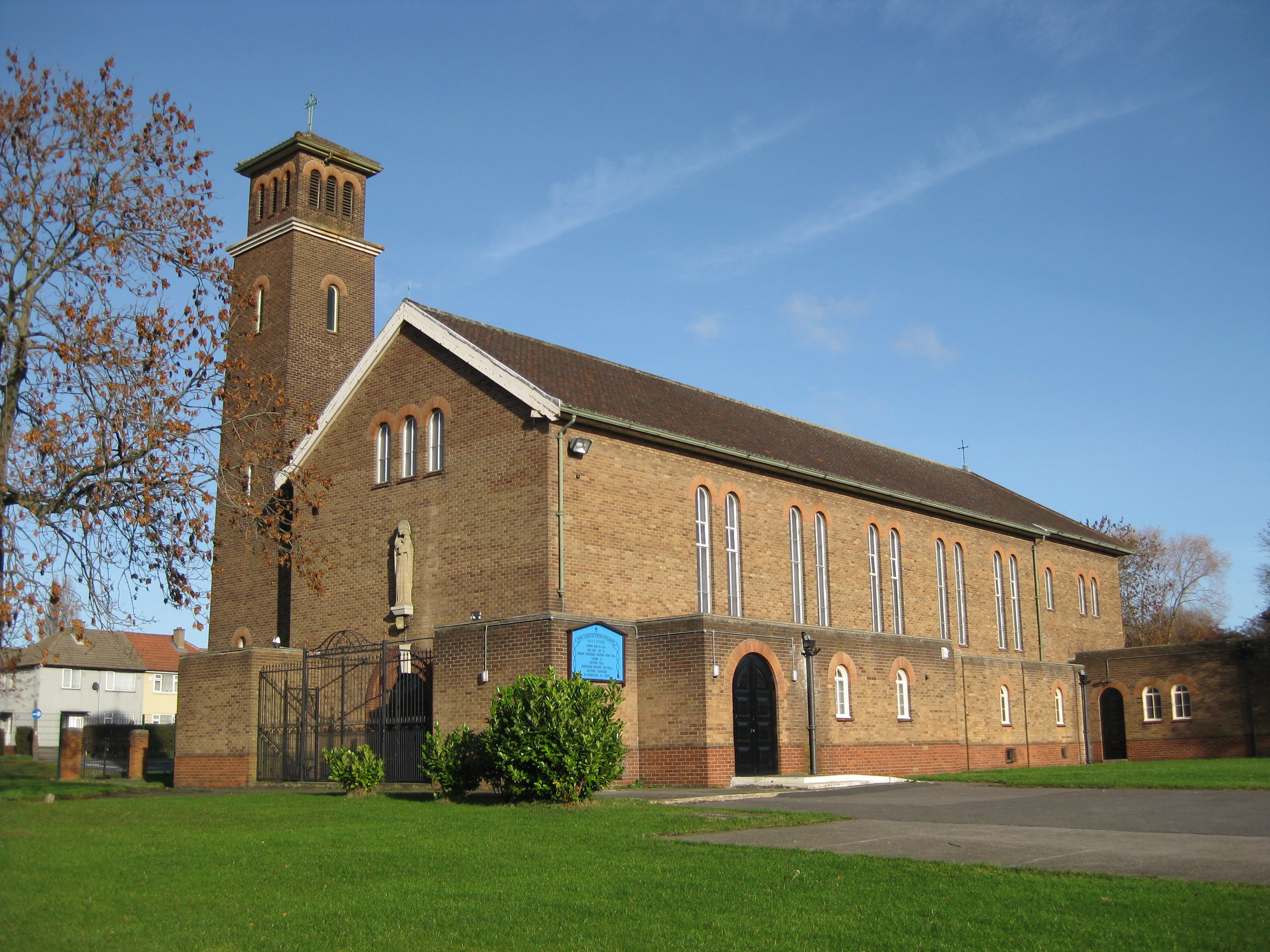
Our Lady of Good Counsel Catholic Church (1954)

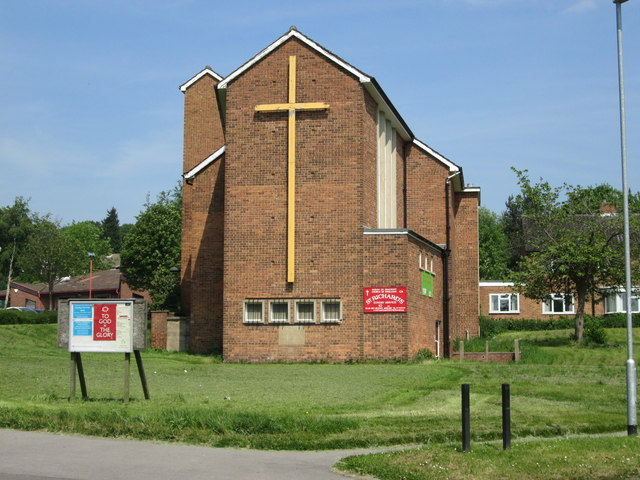
St Richard's CofE church

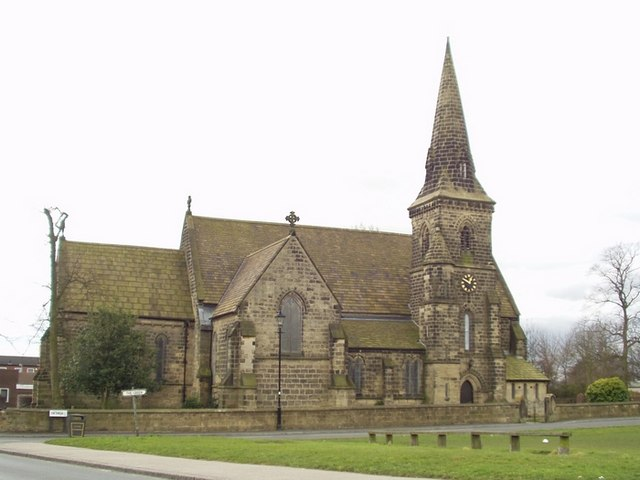
St James' CofE church predates the estate

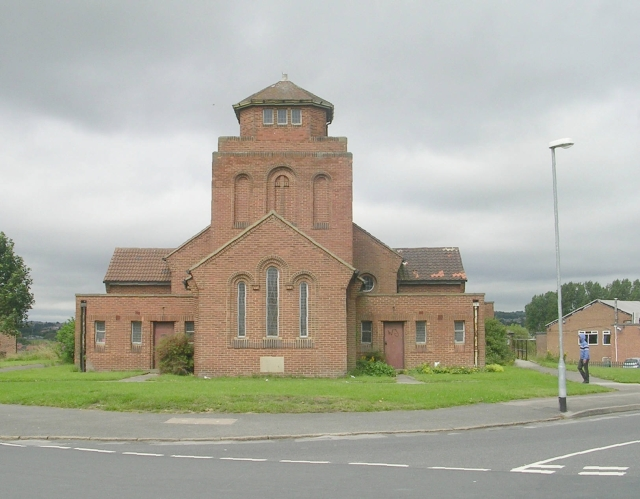
Church of the Assumption, vacated by the church of England in 2012, now used by Forward in Faith

== Seacroft Hospital ==
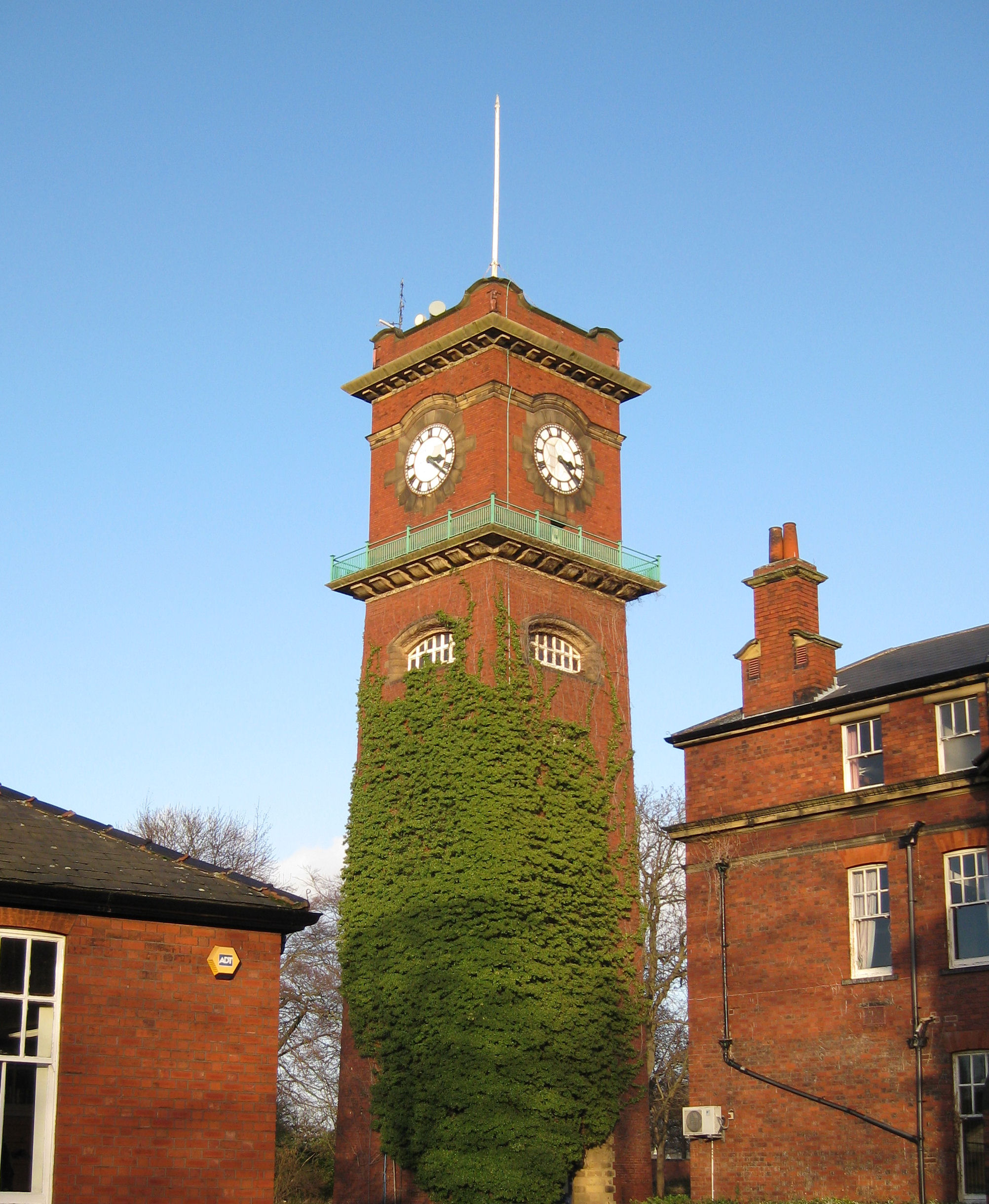
Seacroft Hospital Tower

Seacroft Hospital is Leeds' third-largest hospital, being significantly smaller than the Leeds General Infirmary and St James' University Hospital. Situated between Seacroft and Killingbeck, opposite the former Killingbeck Isolation Hospital, the hospital is accessible from the A64 York Road. It was constructed between 1893 and 1904, with a brick clock tower (also a water tower) designed by E. T. Hall under Arts and Crafts influence.

Services have been moved from Seacroft Hospital to other hospitals around Leeds. Many of the buildings are in a poor state of repair. The health authority, in keeping with its policy to concentrate all services at the Leeds General Infirmary and St James hospitals, considers selling off the older parts of the hospital for redevelopment.

== Industry ==
There is a small industrial estate in Seacroft on Limewood Approach. Cable and Wireless had a depot there for many years, but it closed in 2008. On the estate, Seacroft Waste Sorting Facility is based, Leeds City Council have a major depot and Transco operated a small facility until 2008. Large factories of Agfa and Unilever are situated in nearby Whinmoor.

== Education ==
=== Primary ===
The primary schools in Seacroft are:

- Beechwood Primary School, Kentmere Avenue LS14 6QB
- Grange Farm Primary School , Bancroft Rise LS14 1AX
- Our Lady of Good Counsel Catholic Primary School, Pigeon Cote Road LS14 1EP
- Parklands Primary School , Dufton Approach LS14 6ED
- Seacroft Grange Primary School, Moresdale Lane, LS14 6JR

=== Secondary ===
The Bishop Young Church of England Academy opened on 1 May 2017, the building was previously the David Young Community Academy (DYCA) which was founded in 2006 and closed in spring of 2017, named after David Young, a former bishop of Ripon. It is a state-funded academy sponsored by the Church of England.

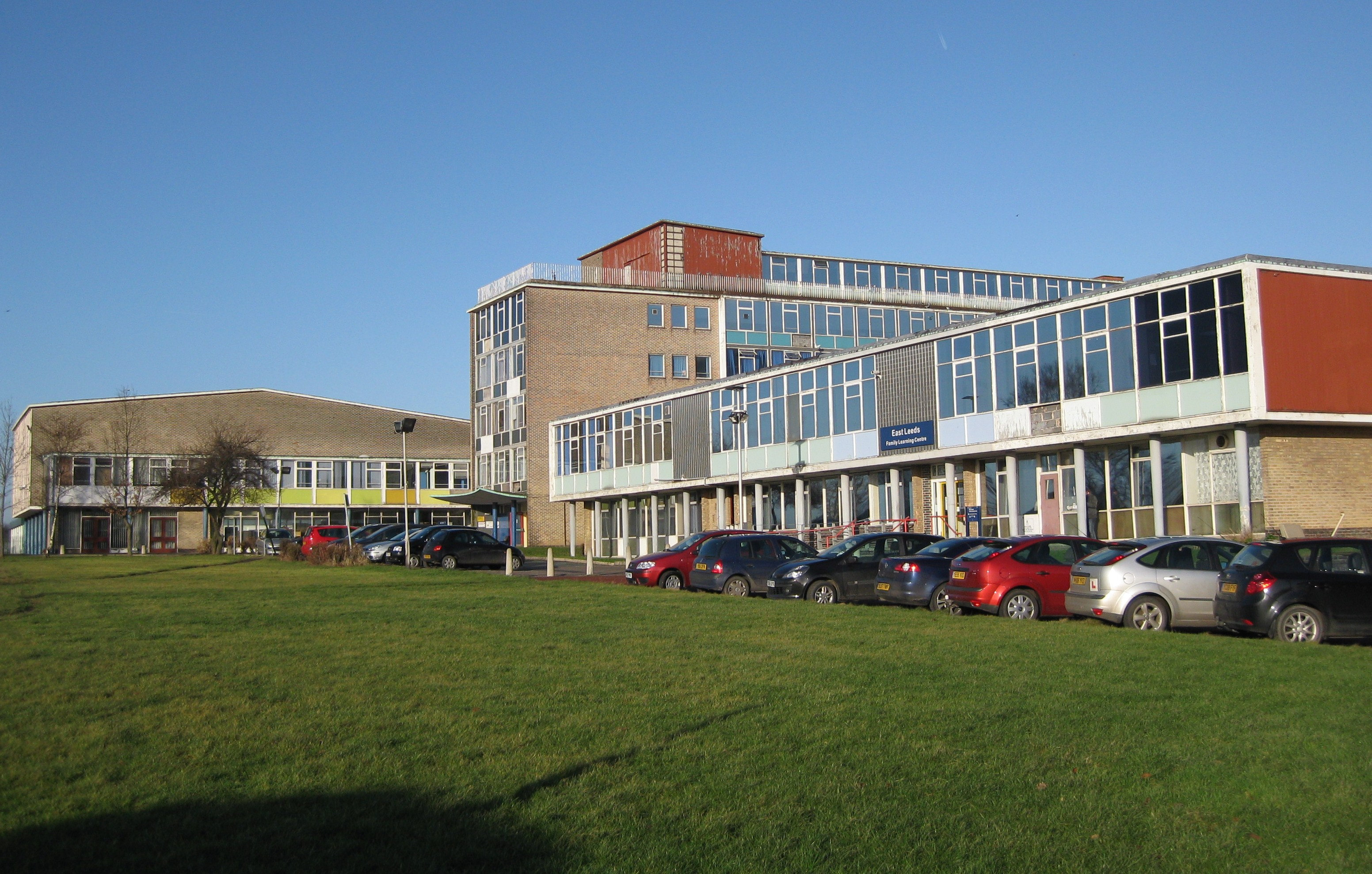
East Leeds Family Learning Centre (former Foxwood School) – now demolished

Leeds East Academy is a coeducational school that originated in Parkland Girls' High School (built 1954) on South Parkway. This was the last single-sex state school in Leeds before its closure. Leeds East Academy has now relocated to new buildings on the same site.

The main secondary school in Seacroft was Foxwood School, which became an adult education centre, the East Leeds Family Learning Centre, but was demolished in 2009. The school was used as 'San Quentin High' in The Beiderbecke Affair. The buildings were completed in 1962 and are a complex of buildings set in a square with a central courtyard. The main building was a six-storey tower block. Notable former pupils include Andrew Edge (musician), David Harvey (footballer) and Ellery Hanley (rugby league player). Former teachers include Colin Burgon (Labour Party MP for Elmet which included Wetherby, Garforth, Cross Gates and Swarcliffe), who himself was from Gipton.

== Politics ==
Seacroft falls into the Killingbeck & Seacroft electoral ward of Leeds City Council and Leeds East parliamentary constituency, represented by Labour MP Richard Burgon. As of 2018, it has three Labour councillors.

Seacroft was formerly a township in the parishes of Whitkirk and Leeds and a chapelry in the parish of Whitkirk, in 1866 Seacroft became a separate civil parish, on 9 November 1912 the parish was abolished and merged with Leeds. In 1911 the parish had a population of 1695.

== Local media ==
The local newspaper for Seacroft is the Yorkshire Evening Post, though the Wetherby News is also sold in the area (although its news coverage generally stops beyond the Shadwell and Whinmoor areas). The local BBC radio station is BBC Radio Leeds. Many other Leeds radio stations can be received, but ChapelFM deals specifically with Seacroft and surrounding areas. Neighbouring areas such as Whinmoor are often covered in Wetherby's Tempo FM.

== Reputation ==
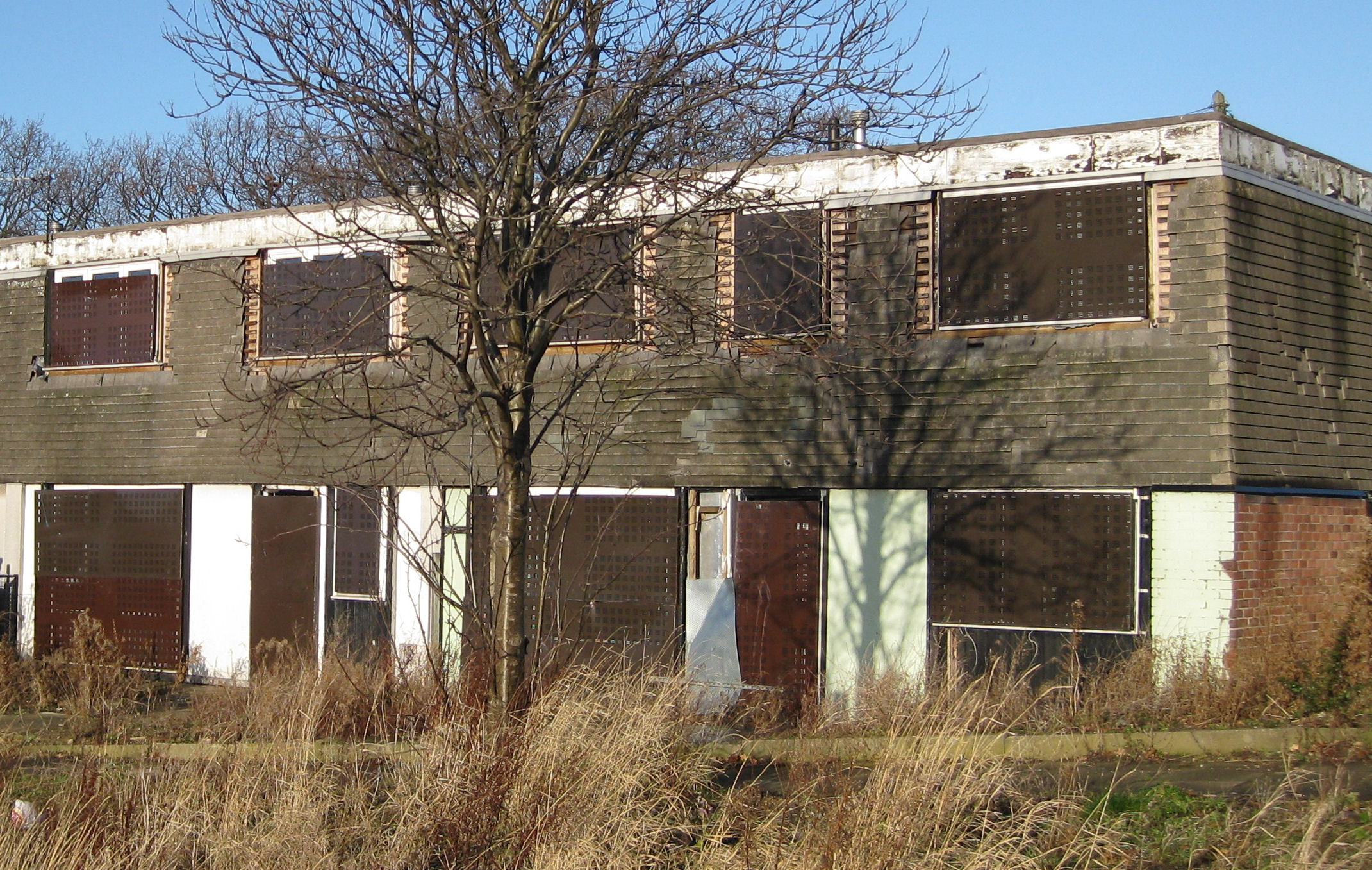
Boarded Housing in Seacroft (demolished)

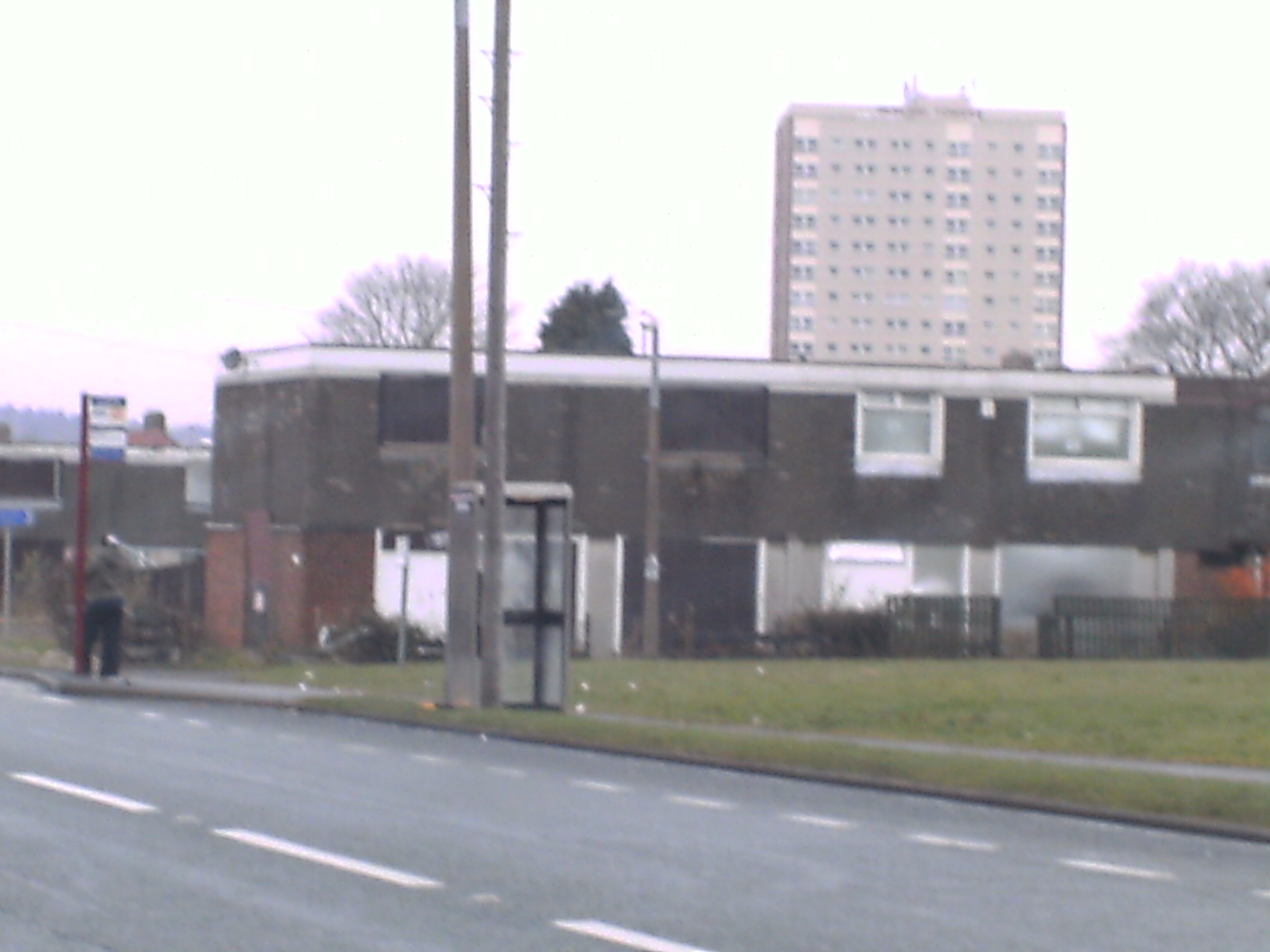
Some people remain in parts of South Parkway delaying regeneration (demolished).

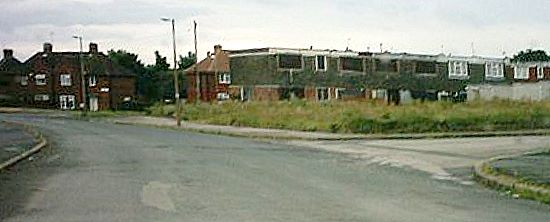
Deserted Seacroft streets in the planned regeneration area (demolished)

Seacroft has a poor reputation across Leeds. A large portion of the housing is council owned, and the few jobs tend to be low paid casual or manual work. Many of the houses, particularly prefabricated housing around South Parkway have been boarded up and are unfit for any future habitation. This is due to a multimillion-pound city re-development scheme whose earlier progress can be seen in the similar estates around the Coal Road area. The area's poor reputation has been focused on by journalist Donal MacIntyre. Neighbouring Gipton also shares this poor reputation. 85.49% of occupied houses in Seacroft fall within the Band A council tax rate (the lowest based on house values). However, the negative image of Seacroft was challenged in 2008 by a BBC article called 'The Estate' depicting life on the estate.

=== Recorded crime statistics ===
Below is a table from Leeds Observatory, detailing crime from 2018 ward in LS14 from March 2020 to February 2021.

| Recorded Crime (Most to Least) | Count | Per 1000 | % Of Total |
|---|---|---|---|
| All Crime | 5404 | 231.46 | 100 |
| All Reported Crime (Excluding ASB) | 4,327 | 185.33 | 80.07 |
| Violence And Sexual Offences | 2,002 | 85.75 | 37.05 |
| Antisocial Behaviour (ASB) | 1,077 | 46.13 | 19.93 |
| Criminal Damage And Arson | 579 | 24.8 | 10.71 |
| Public Order | 526 | 22.53 | 9.73 |
| Other Theft | 296 | 12.68 | 5.45 |
| Shoplifting | 205 | 8.78 | 3.8 |
| Domestic Burglary | 201 | 8.61 | 3.72 |
| Vehicle Crime | 166 | 7.11 | 3.08 |
| Other Crime | 125 | 5.35 | 2.31 |
| Drugs | 101 | 4.33 | 1.87 |
| Robbery | 37 | 1.58 | 0.68 |
| Bicycle Theft | 33 | 1.41 | 0.61 |
| Possession Of Weapons | 32 | 1.37 | 0.59 |
| Theft From The Person | 24 | 1.03 | 0.44 |

== Transport ==
=== Public transport ===
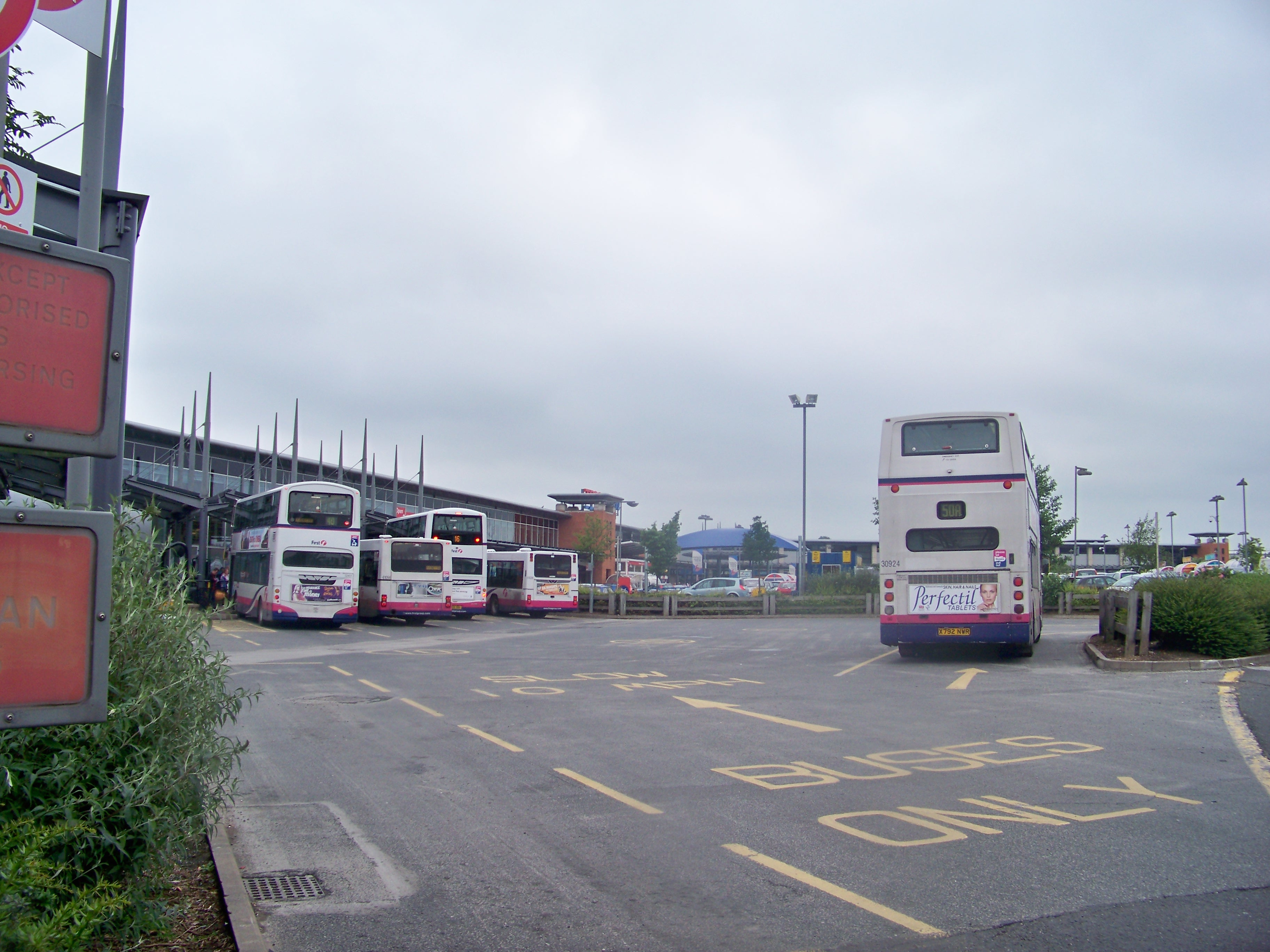
Seacroft bus station

Seacroft bus station was rebuilt as part of the Seacroft Green Shopping Centre and has five drive-in-reverse-out stands. Buses go from here to Leeds City Centre and to other neighbouring areas of the city such as Cross Gates, Gipton and Whinmoor as well as Wetherby. First Leeds runs the majority of the services that serve the bus station. Their service 49 serves the Monkswood Gate area in the north of Seacroft, but not the bus station.

The closest railway station is Cross Gates, with services operating to Leeds, Garforth, Bradford Interchange, Halifax, York, Hull and Scarborough.

=== East Leeds Orbital Route (ELOR) ===
Since the 1960s, the Leeds Outer Ring Road has been considered to create a social barrier between Seacroft and Swarcliffe, which prompted calls for a bypass around East Leeds' suburbs. The project started in summer 2018 and is set to build a new 7.5-kilometre (4.7 mi) route linking the orbital Ring Road (A6120) at Red Hall to the A58, the A64 and Leeds Road to connect with Thorpe Park at Junction 46 of the M1, set to be complete by summer 2023 with enhancement finished by autumn 2023.

The East Leeds Orbital Route is the biggest infrastructure project undertaken by Leeds City Council for fifty years, since the completion of the Leeds Inner Ring Road in 1974. It is intended to ease congestion in existing residential areas like Cross Gates, Seacroft and Whitkirk, and will also play a key role in the growth plans for the city for years to come. It will allow the development of the surrounding areas of the road, with the development of possible new shops, houses, and schools.

== Distances to nearby places of significance ==
- Cross Gates 1.3 miles (2.1 km)
- Whinmoor 1.8 miles (2.9 km)
- Scholes 2.4 miles (3.9 km)
- Garforth 4.6 miles (7.4 km)
- Wetherby 8.4 miles (13.5 km)
- Castleford 10.2 miles (16.4 km)
- Leeds Bradford Airport 12.1 miles (19.5 km)
- Wakefield 14.2 miles (22.9 km)
- Bradford 15.4 miles (24.8 km)
- Harrogate 15.4 miles (24.8 km)
- York 17.1 miles (27.5 km)

== See also ==
- List of large council estates in the UK
- Listed buildings in Seacroft and Killingbeck
