= Halton Moor =

District of Leeds, West Yorkshire, England

Coordinates: 53.7923°N 1.4821°W

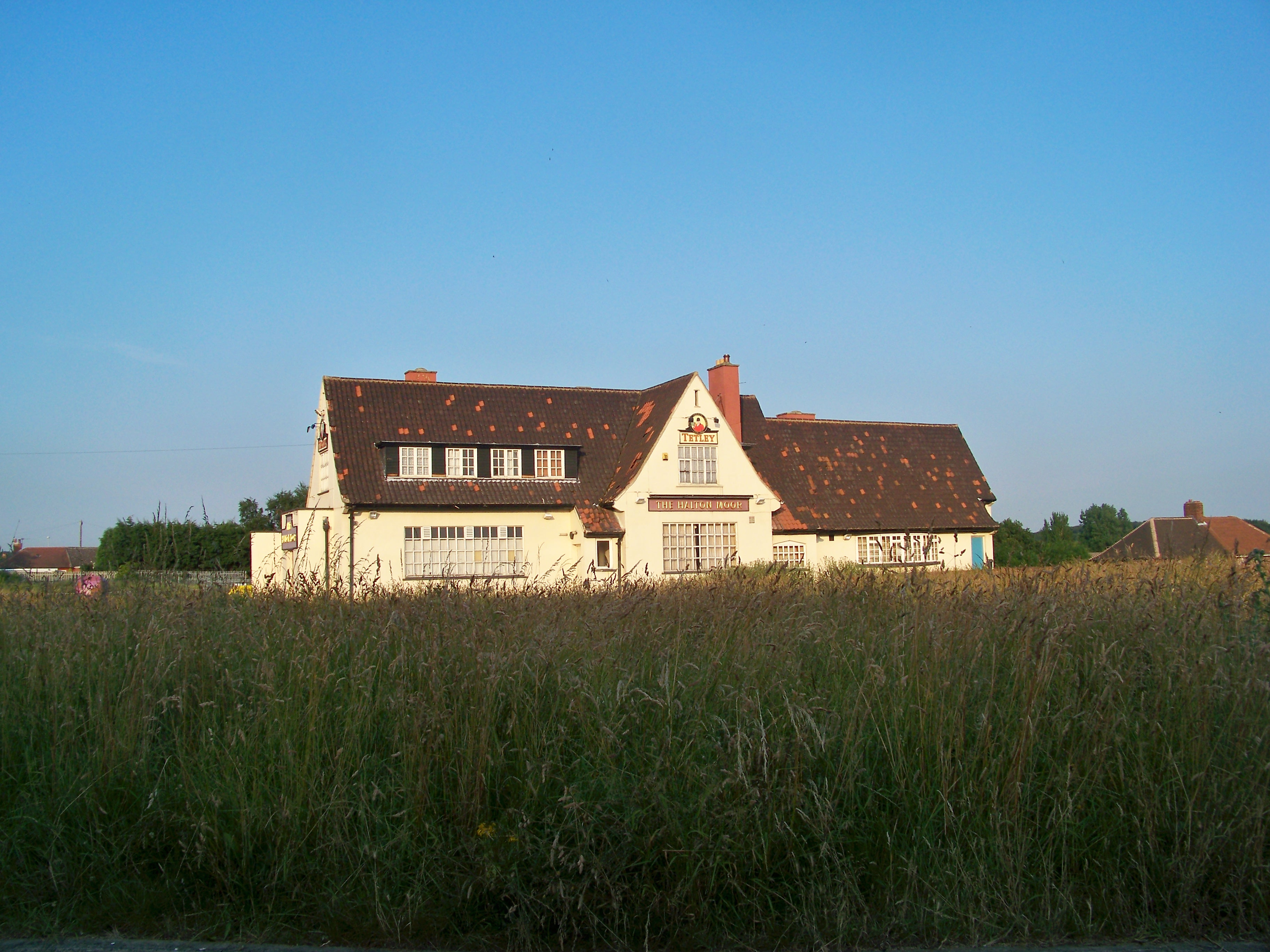
- The Halton Moor public house

- Location within West Yorkshire
- Metropolitan borough: City of Leeds
- Metropolitan county: West Yorkshire
- Region: Yorkshire and the Humber
- Country: England
- Sovereign state: United Kingdom
- Post town: LEEDS
- Postcode district: LS15 & LS9
- Dialling code: 0113
- Police: West Yorkshire
- Fire: West Yorkshire
- Ambulance: Yorkshire
- UK Parliament: Leeds East

Halton Moor is a district of east Leeds, West Yorkshire, England, about three miles east of Leeds city centre close to the A63. It is situated between Killingbeck to the north, Temple Newsam to the south, Osmondthorpe to the west and Halton and Colton to the east.

The area falls into the Temple Newsam ward of Leeds City Council and Leeds East parliamentary constituency.

The area is mainly a council housing estate with approximately 1000 homes, made up of semi-detached houses, with some detached and terraced houses and some high rise blocks of flats. Halton Moor lies within the LS15 & LS9 postcode, with Wyke Beck forming its western boundary.

In 2018, the Halton Moor Public House was demolished and will be replaced by a housing development. Many housing developments are currently being constructed in and around the estate.

== History ==
Before the 20th century, Halton Moor was open land between Osmondthorpe and the older village of Halton which was constructed in the late 19th century. Halton Moor Estate was built in the 1930s, one of several low-density housing estates in Leeds built to accommodate the growing population and to house people moved from the areas of high-density housing destroyed in the inner-city slum clearances.

Housing is red brick terraced and semi-detached housing typical of council housing of its era. Later in the twentieth century a high-rise block of flats was constructed to the south of the estate and stands in contrast to the low-density 1930s council housing that makes up the rest of the estate.

Through the 1980s and 1990s, the estate suffered a period of decline. Although it benefited from estate action funding from 1989, by 2000 the decline was so marked that a committee of MPs recommended the estate for demolition and reconstruction. However, following substantial intervention both through the renovation of the housing stock and selective demolition of harder to let properties, the estate is now seen as having good scope for continuing regeneration.

== Geography and demographics ==
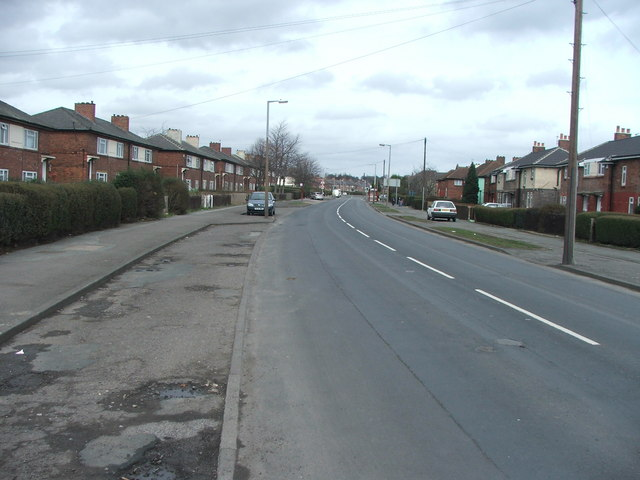
Halton Moor Avenue with housing typical of the estate.

Halton Moor was built as a low density garden suburb, one of several constructed in Leeds in the 1930s and 1940s. It is set on the side of a hill overlooking East End Park and Leeds City Centre. The western boundary of Halton Moor is marked by Wyke Beck, a tributary of the River Aire which rises in Roundhay Park and discharges into the River Aire at Rothwell.

The estate is laid out around Coronation Parade, a central boulevard running east to west. Several roads running broadly north to south following the contours of the hillside, while at the centre of the estate is a relatively large open greenspace. Subsequently, substantial traffic calming measures including the installation of speed cushions and bumps, chicanes and selective road closures have been introduced to reduce the level of joyriding. To the north of the Halton Moor Estate but forming part of Halton Moor is the Sutton Park Estate, an older housing estate built by the William Sutton Housing Trust and now part of the Affinity Sutton housing association. In 2011, construction of 54 new homes including a number built to the German 'passivhaus' standard for low energy development was completed.

Halton Moor combined with the Wykebecks in Osmondthorpe has a population of around 6,233 people. 5.43% of the population is from a BME background, around half the proportion for Leeds as a whole. The area has higher than average levels of benefit claimants and worklessness, though it compares favourably to Leeds as a whole for indicators around quality of housing and environment, and community safety.

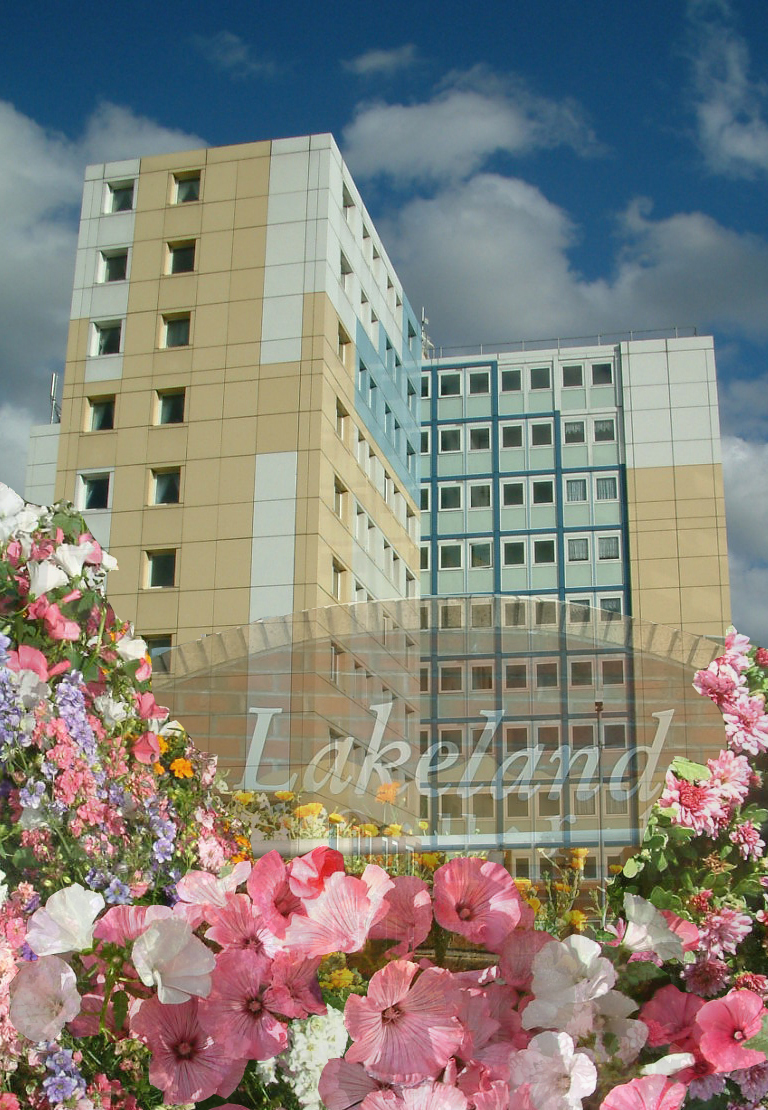
Lakeland Court

== Regeneration ==
The estate was granted Estate Action funding in 1989, which ran into the 2000s. In 2000, the estate was visited by a Parliamentary committee who identified problem with high unemployment, low demand for housing on the estate, high rates of crime; particularly joy riding and arson and low take up of resident property purchases under the right-to-buy scheme (at the time around 3–5 per cent of properties had been bought). The committee noted that previous regeneration programmes on the estate had failed and that social problems and dilapidation persisted. Traffic calming measures were introduced around this time to mitigate problems associated with joy riding. The estate's three tower blocks; each containing 60 flats were rationalised due to low demand. Two of these blocks were demolished in the early 2000s and the third; Lakeland Court was refurbished at a cost of £3 million. Residents in the two demolished blocks were rehoused in Lakeland Court and other vacant properties on the estate.

== Amenities ==
The estate has relatively few amenities compared to other 1930s estates in the city such as Belle Isle and Middleton. The Halton Moor at the centre of the estate was a landmark, but this closed in 2009 and was demolished in 2018; there is also a convenience store on the estate. To the edge of the estate there are churches and schools. Besides this all local amenities are on Selby Road in Halton.

== Religious sites ==
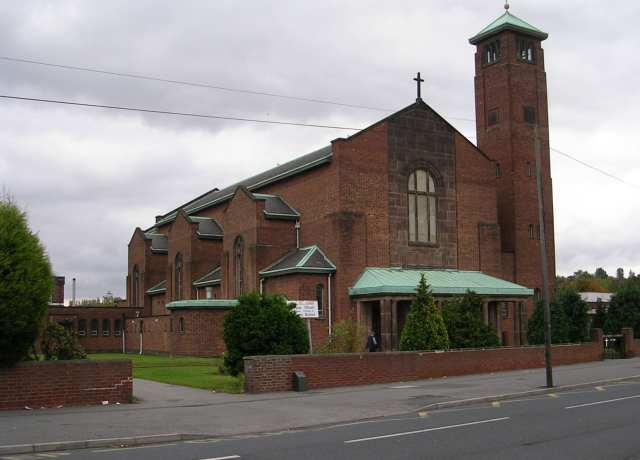
Corpus Christi Catholic Church

The whole of the Halton Moor is within the Anglican parish of St Wilfrid, Halton, which is a grade II* listed church built in 1939 at a cost of £11,700 and designed by A. Randall Wells. The church is in the Arts and Crafts style and still has many of the original fittings designed by Wells as well as contemporary art by Eric Gill.

On the Halton Moor estate, the Corpus Christi Roman Catholic Church opened in 1962. Until 2008, the church was not part of the Roman Catholic Diocese of Leeds, but was under the jurisdiction of the Missionary Oblates of Mary Immaculate, a French Roman Catholic order. Corpus Christi has primary and secondary schools operated by the Diocese of Leeds associated with it.

== Governance ==
Halton Moor is within the Temple Newsam Ward of Leeds City Council and is represented by three Labour councillors. The estate is in the Leeds East parliamentary constituency and is represented by Labour MP Richard Burgon.

== Notable people ==
The entrepreneur and philanthropist Jimi Heselden was born and brought up in Halton Moor.

The author and playwright Keith Waterhouse moved to Halton Moor from Hunslet, and attended Osmondthorpe School.

Simon Clifford, the football coach and owner of Garforth Town A.F.C., taught for several years at Corpus Christi Catholic Primary school in Halton Moor.

The former Wales international footballer Aubrey Powell, who also played for Leeds United, Everton and Birmingham City lived for many years in Halton Moor following his retirement from football.

Actress Liz Dawn, known for portraying Vera Duckworth in Coronation Street (as a regular from 1976 to 2008) grew up on the estate.

== In the media ==
Due to its decline in the 1980s and 1990s, Halton Moor has been the focus of media attention, of which much was negative. In 2008 this led to the area becoming the subject of the television series CCTV Cities in which journalist Donal MacIntyre focused on crime and delinquency, showing arson on Bonfire Night (during which police were attacked with fireworks), car theft and joyriding.

Before the United Kingdom general elections of 2001 and 2005, author and journalist Sue Townsend reported for The Observer, looking at the impact of a Labour Government on some of the most deprived areas in Leeds. The second visit identified improvements to the estate brought about by regeneration.

The TV films Tina Goes Shopping and Tina Takes a Break, the first parts of a trilogy (including Mischief Night, directed by Penny Woolcock), were partly filmed on Halton Moor using several actors from the area, some of whom subsequently fell foul of the law in real life for activities depicted in the films.

The area also received extensive media coverage in April 2014, after a teacher was fatally stabbed by a pupil at Corpus Christi Catholic College in an isolated event.

National media continue to return to the estate for stories of crime, lawlessness and antisocial behaviour, with various newspapers dubbing the estate as "The Zoo" in 2020.

== See also ==
- Listed buildings in Leeds (Temple Newsam Ward)
