= St Wilfrid's Church, Halton =

St Wilfrid's Church, Halton may refer to:

- St Wilfrid's Church, Halton-on-Lune, a 19th-century church in Lancashire, England
- St Wilfrid's Church, Halton, Leeds, a 20th-century church in West Yorkshire, England
