= Halton, Leeds =

District of Leeds, England

Coordinates: 53.7958°N 1.4699°W

Halton
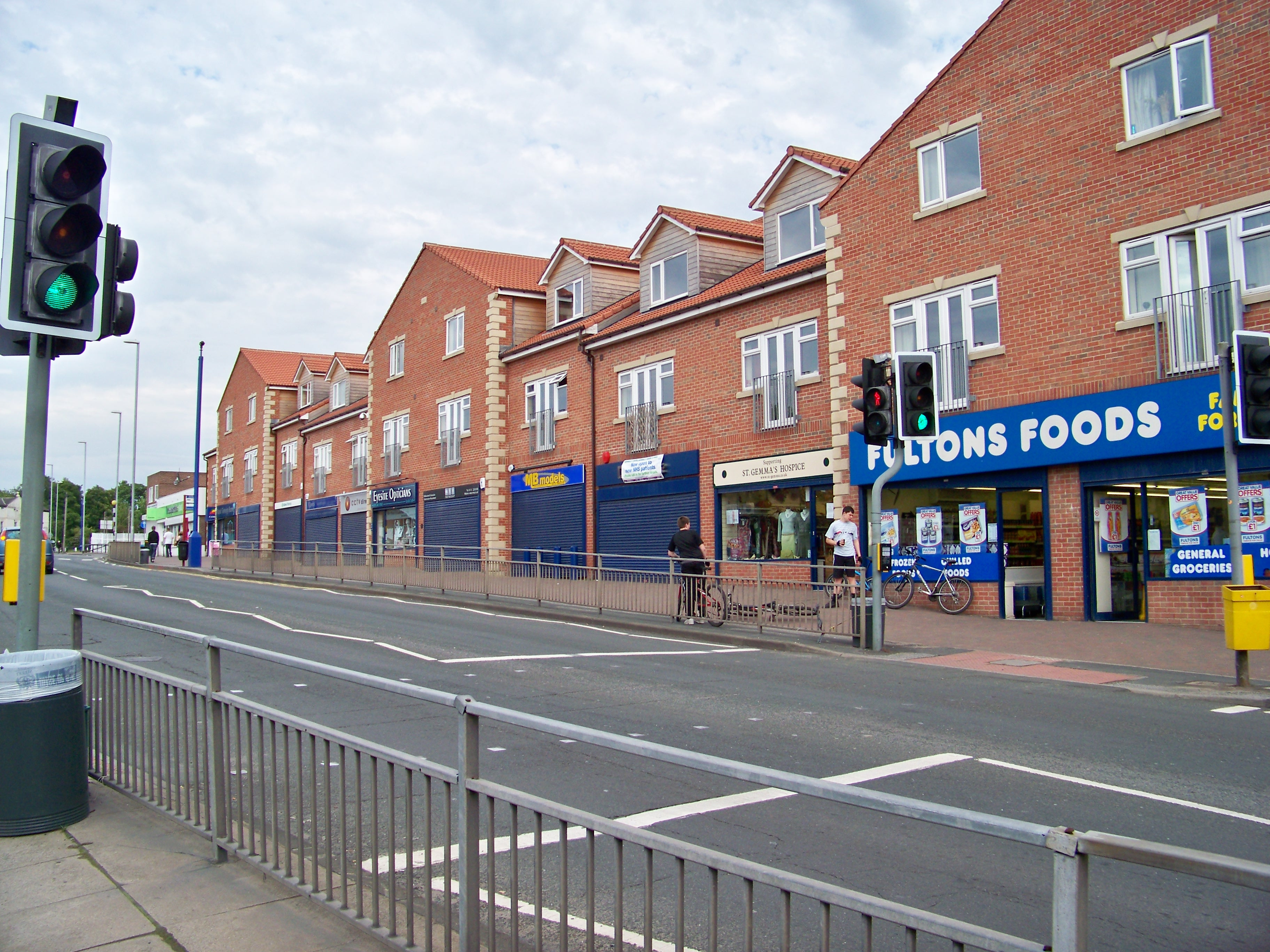
- Shops on Selby Road

- Location within West Yorkshire
- Population: 7,845 (Halton and Whitkirk combined)
- Metropolitan borough: City of Leeds
- Metropolitan county: West Yorkshire
- Region: Yorkshire and the Humber
- Country: England
- Sovereign state: United Kingdom
- Post town: LEEDS
- Postcode district: LS15
- Dialling code: 0113
- Police: West Yorkshire
- Fire: West Yorkshire
- Ambulance: Yorkshire
- UK Parliament: Leeds East

Halton is a district of east Leeds, West Yorkshire, England, situated between Cross Gates to the north, Halton Moor to the west, Colton to the east and Whitkirk to the South. Temple Newsam lies directly south of the estate.

The area falls into the Temple Newsam ward of Leeds City Council and Leeds East parliamentary constituency.

== Etymology ==
The name of Halton is first attested in the Domesday Book of 1086, in the forms Halletun and Halletune. The name comes from the Old English words halh ('nook, corner of land') and tūn ('farm, estate'), and thus once meant 'estate in a corner of land'.

The parish also contains Halton Deans, first attested in the period 1170–90 in Latin or French form, as denam de Haleton, and in English form in the same century as Haletun dene and variants thereof. The deans element here comes from the Old English word denu ('valley'); the -s appears to have been added after the medieval period.

== History ==
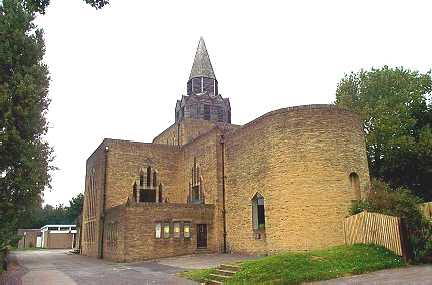
St Wilfrid's Anglican Church, built in 1939

Halton was originally developed as a village on the main road linking Leeds and Selby. Development immediately before and after the Second World War, saw Halton grow substantially into a suburb of Leeds.

St Wilfrid's Church in Halton is a grade II* listed church built in 1939 at a cost of £11,700 and designed by A. Randall Wells. The church is in the Arts and Crafts style and still has many of the original fittings designed by Wells as well as contemporary art by Eric Gill.

== Demographics ==
Halton is a suburban area of mainly owner-occupied housing of which almost three-quarters is semi detached or detached. The area compares favourably with Leeds as a whole in relation to indicators of deprivation, with relatively low levels of crime and anti-social behaviour, low levels of households in receipt of means-tested and out-of-work benefits and high levels of educational attainment. The area has a low level of people from BME backgrounds.

== Local facilities and attractions ==
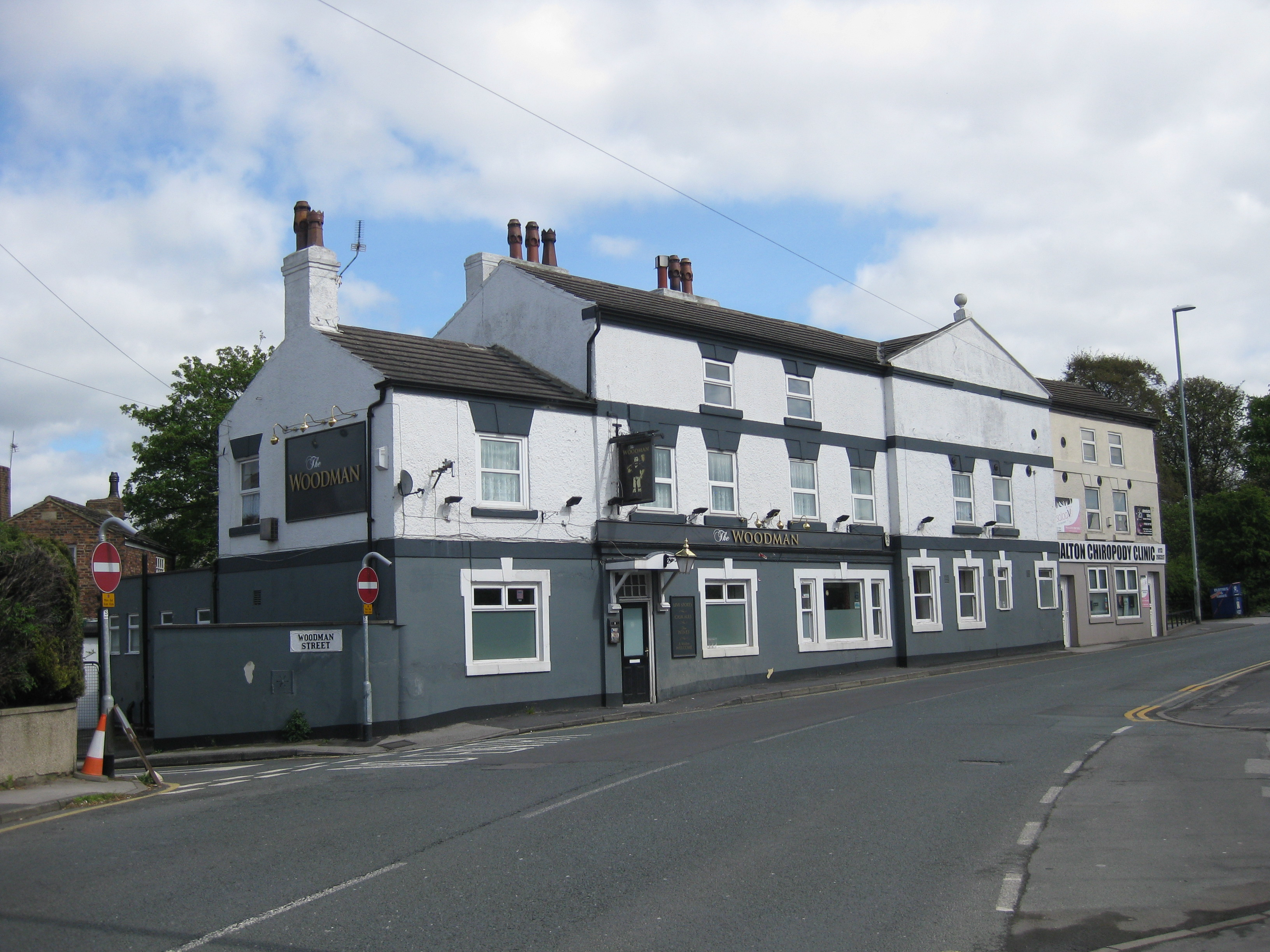
The Woodman, Selby Road

The main Public Houses of Halton were the Irwin Arms (now demolished), The Travellers Rest (now demolished) and The Woodman.

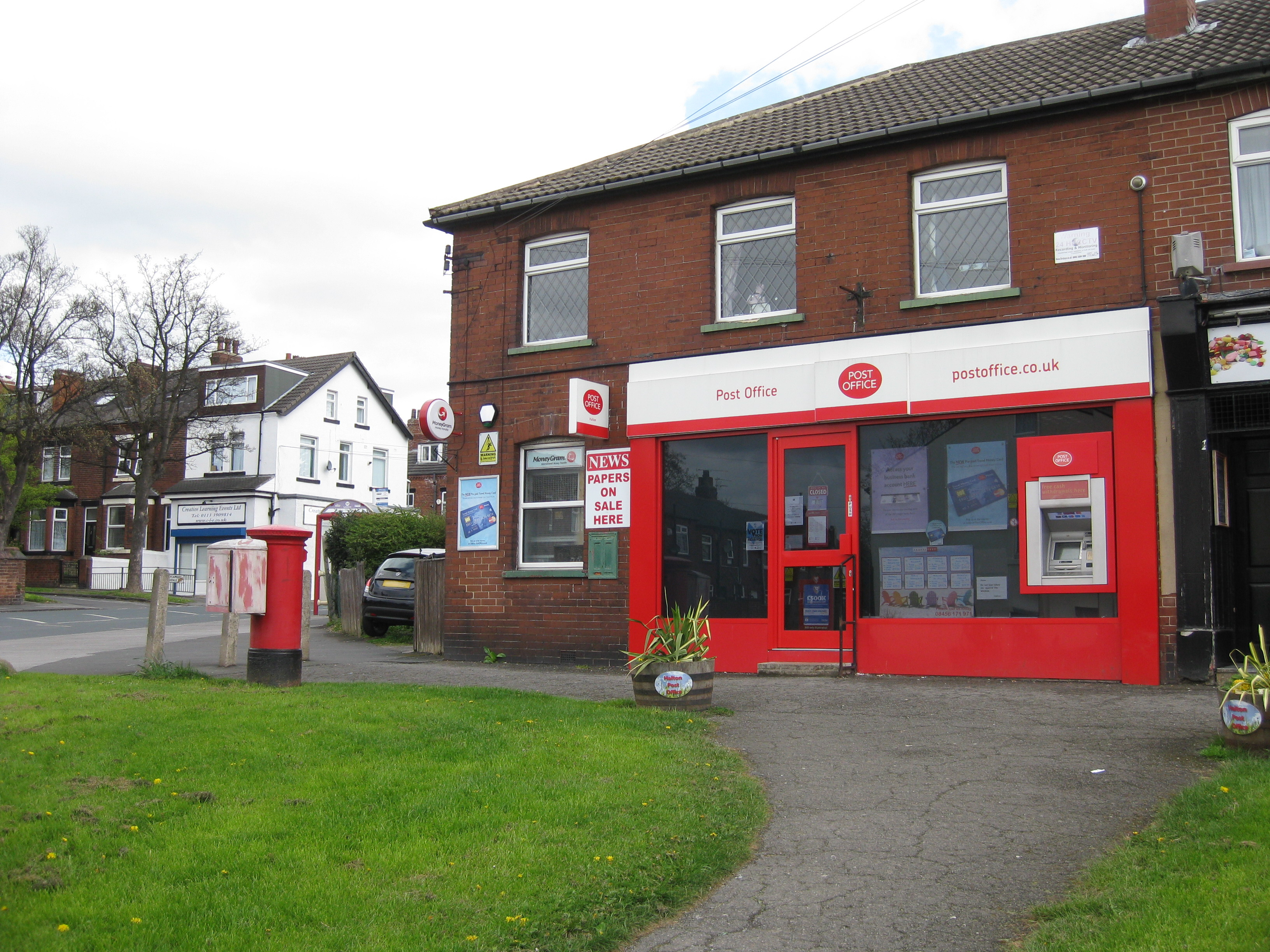
Halton Post Office

There is a Lidl and Tesco Express.

The local Primary School is named Templenewsam Halton Primary School, with Whitkirk Primary also being within the local area.

The area is 3.5 miles (5.6 km) to the east of Leeds city centre and is close to the A63 dual carriageway.

== Notable people ==
- Beryl Burton – cyclist
- Christabel Burniston – founder of the English Speaking Board

== See also ==
- Listed buildings in Leeds (Temple Newsam Ward)
