= Listed buildings in Leeds (Temple Newsam Ward) =

Temple Newsam is a ward in the metropolitan borough of the City of Leeds, West Yorkshire, England. It contains 51 listed buildings that are recorded in the National Heritage List for England. Of these, two are listed at Grade I, the highest of the three grades, three are at Grade II*, the middle grade, and the others are at Grade II, the lowest grade. The ward is to the east of the centre of Leeds, it is largely residential, and contains the suburbs of Colton, Halton, Halton Moor and Whitkirk. The most important building in the ward is Temple Newsam House, which is listed, together with associated structures and buildings in the surrounding park. Most of the other listed buildings are houses, cottages and associated structures, farmhouses and farm buildings. The rest include churches and associated structures, a former windmill and mill buildings, two railway bridges, and a school.

== Key ==
Grade	Criteria
I	Buildings of exceptional interest, sometimes considered to be internationally important
II*	Particularly important buildings of more than special interest
II	Buildings of national importance and special interest

== Buildings ==
Name and location	Photograph	Date	Notes	Grade
St Mary's Church, Whitkirk; 53.79734°N 1.44970°W		15th century	The church, which is in Perpendicular style, was restored in 1855–56, and the chancel was extended in 1901 by G. F. Bodley. The church is built in stone, and consists of a nave with a clerestory, north and south aisles, a south porch, a chancel, north and south chapels, and a west tower. The tower has diagonal buttresses and an embattled parapet on corbels, with obelisk pinnacles, and a short lead-clad spire. The aisles have projecting parapets on large corbels, some carved as grotesques.	I
Temple Newsam House; 53.78436°N 1.45971°W		Early 16th century	A country house that was later altered and extended and converted into a museum. It has stone foundations, and is built in red brick, with diapering decoration, stone dressings, quoins, parapets, and a stone slate roof. There are three ranges forming a U-shaped plan, and the windows are mullioned and transomed. The west garden front has three storeys and nine bays, and contains two-storey canted bay windows in the central and outer bays. The north wing has three storeys and seven bays, and contains an entrance with a four-centred arch. The courtyard side of the south wing contains a central entrance that has a round arch with a keystone, and is flanked by paired fluted columns, an entablature, a dentilled cornice, a coat of arms, and a broken pediment with a bust.	I
Manor House and The Keep; 53.79588°N 1.44910°W		Early 17th century	The house, later divided, is in roughcast stone, and has a stone slate roof with coped gables, kneelers with obelisk finials, and cross finials on the apex. There are two storeys and three bays. The central doorway has a moulded surround, a four-centred arched head, and a moulded ogee head with a cross finial. The windows are casements, those in the ground floor with hood moulds.	II
Barn, Temple Newsam House; 53.78551°N 1.45762°W	—	Late 17th century	The barn to the northeast of the stables is in red brick on a stone plinth, with quoins, and a stone slate roof with coped gables and a ball finial. It has twelve bays, and contains a central large elliptical-headed entrance, triangular vents, and a dated stone tablet. At right angles is a two-storey wing with a cart shed and stable, and later outbuildings.	II
Bridge over Avenue Ponds, Temple Newsham Park; 53.78080°N 1.44032°W		1714	The bridge, which was designed by William Etty, is in stone. It is in the form of a dam wall with a sluice at the centre, that has an elliptical arch on the south side. The bridge has a string course, a parapet with plain coping, and square end piers with moulded caps.	II
3, 3A and 4 Colton Road, Whitkirk; 53.79764°N 1.44892°W	—	1732	A house, later divided, in red brick with stone dressings, chamfered quoins, and a hipped stone slate roof. There are two storeys and five bays. On the left is a wide cart entry, and the other openings in the ground floor have segmental arched-heads. The two doorways have fanlights, and the windows are sashes. In the centre of the upper floor is a date plaque with a Knights Templar's cross and initials.	II
North Lodges, wall and gate piers, Temple Newsham Park; 53.79019°N 1.45533°W	—	1742	The pair of lodges at the north entrance to the park were designed by Andrew Fountaine. They are in brick with projecting eaves, and each has a pyramidal stone slate roof with a finial. They have two storeys, a square plan, and the west lodge has a later wing. The doorways have architraves with a pulvinated frieze and a cornice, and the windows are sashes. Attached to each lodge is a low brick wall linking to a short brick pier with a stone band and a pedimented cap.	II
Stables, Temple Newsam House; 53.78489°N 1.45837°W		c. 1742	The stables, which were extended in the 1760s by Lancelot Brown, are in red-brown brick, with stone dressings and a hipped stone slate roof. There are two storeys, and they form a courtyard plan. The main entrance on the west has a central round arch, and a moulded pediment containing a clock face in the tympanum, flanked by smaller round-arched niches over which are square windows. On the roof is an octagonal louvred cupola with a weathervane in the form of a cock. Flanking this are five-bay wings containing sash windows. The south front has three bays and a central doorway with a pediment, and on the front facing the yard is a mounting block.	II*
396 Selby Road, Whitkirk; 53.79782°N 1.44879°W	—	1744	A brick house with a string course, dentilled eaves, and a stone slate roof. There are two storeys and three bays. The doorway in the right bay has a moulded surround, a fanlight, and a cornice on consoles, and the windows are top-hung casements.	II
1 and 2 Colton Road, Whitkirk; 53.79780°N 1.44894°W	—	Mid 18th century	A house, later a house and a shop, it is in brick with stone dressings, chamfered quoins, a string course, dentilled eaves, and a stone slate roof. There are two storeys, three bays, and an added bay on the right. The building contains doorways with fanlights, a shop window on the left, and the other windows are replacement casements.	II
5 Colton Road, Whitkirk, stables and outbuildings 53.79755°N 1.44892°W	—	Mid 18th century	The house and outbuilding are in stone and brick, they are rendered, with roofs of stone slate and corrugated asbestos, and have two storeys. The house to the left has two bays, a doorway with a fanlight and sashes. The former outbuilding to the right has three bays, the right bay gabled, and it contains a segmental archway. At the rear is a former stable block with segmental-headed windows, a loft door, and dentilled eaves, and on the roof is a small wooden louvred lantern.	II
Colton Mill; 53.79206°N 1.43027°W	—	Mid 18th century (probable)	A group consisting of a former windmill and mill buildings. The windmill has a circular stone base, it tapers upwards, and the upper floor is in brick. It has segmental-arched openings, a dentilled eaves cornice, and a conical roof. To the northwest is a stone granary with three storeys and two bays, and to the south is the brick engine house with two storeys and two bays.	II
Holly Tree Farmhouse; 53.79017°N 1.44117°W	—	Mid 18th century	A brick cottage with traces of stone, and a stone slate roof. There are two storeys and two bays. Most of the windows are casements in moulded surrounds.	II
Ivy House; 53.79748°N 1.45015°W	—	Mid 18th century	A brick house with a band, a dentilled eaves cornice, and a stone slate roof. There are two storeys and attics, and a front of five bays. On the front and at the rear are doorways with fanlights, the windows are sashes, and at the rear is a round-headed stair window.	II
Park Farmhouse; 53.78733°N 1.44784°W	—	Mid 18th century	The farmhouse is in red brick with a hipped stone slate roof. There are two storeys, an L-shaped plan, and four bays, the left bay projecting slightly and the right bay with a lower roof. On the front are two doorways, one with a fanlight, and the windows are three-light casements.	II
Boundary wall, Temple Newsham Park; 53.79008°N 1.45482°W	—	18th century	The wall flanking the north lodges is in red brick with stone coping. It forms the north boundary to the park and extends for about 150 metres (490 ft).	II
Dial House; 53.79695°N 1.46861°W		1755	The house is in brick with stone dressings, rusticated quoins, a moulded eaves cornice, and a stone slate roof. There are three storeys and three bays. The central doorway has an architrave and a pediment, and the window above is round-headed with a moulded architrave, impost blocks, and a keystone. In the outer bays of the lower two floors are Venetian windows, and the top floor contains rectangular windows; all the windows are sashes. At the rear of the house is a datestone.	II
Sphinx Gates, Temple Newsam House; 53.78504°N 1.45560°W		c. 1760	The gate piers designed by Lancelot Brown are in rusticated stone, and have a frieze with a Greek key motif, a panel with a drape, and a moulded cornice. Each pier is surmounted by a sphinx in lead, and between the piers are cast iron gates.	II
Little Temple, Temple Newsham Park; 53.78372°N 1.44848°W		1760s	The temple is in the form of an open-fronted shelter. At the front are four sandstone columns with clustered shafts, acanthus leaf capitals, and an abacus with egg and dart moulding. The columns carry a timber entablature with a pediment, and the cornice and frieze continue round the sides. The rear wall is in rendered brick on a plinth, the east side is closed, and the roof is in stone slate with clay ridge tiles.	II*
1 and 2 Park Road, Colton, and wall 53.79081°N 1.44360°W	—	Late 18th century	A red brick house with a dentilled eaves cornice and a stone slate roof, hipped at one end. There are two storeys, and an L-shaped plan, with a front of two bays, and a gabled rear wing. The doorways have modern porches, and the windows are casements. To the north and west of the house are red brick walls with rounded coping, ramped up to the house.	II
Archway to stables 53.79733°N 1.44895°W	—	Late 18th century	The archway at the entrance to the stables is in stone, and has two storeys and five bays, the middle bay projecting slightly. In the middle bay is an elliptical archway with a keystone and a continuous impost band. In the ground floor, the flanking bays contain round-arched windows, and the outer bays have round-arched recesses. The upper floor contains square windows.	II
Home Farmhouse; 53.78501°N 1.45749°W	—	Late 18th century	The farmhouse is in brick with a hipped stone slate roof, two storeys and an irregular plan. The south front has five bays and contains a mix of sash and casement windows with segmental brick arches. To the east is a projecting wing with casement windows.	II
Dovecote, laundry and sheds, Home Farm; 53.78504°N 1.45690°W	—	Late 18th century	A tall brick building with a string course and a hipped stone slate roof, two storeys and three bays. In the centre is a carriageway with a segmental arch, in the outer bays are cart sheds, and on the left return are external stone steps. The top floor contains hundreds of nesting recesses. At the east end is a laundry building, and on the north side is a single-storey five-bay shelter shed with segmental-arched openings.	II
Princess Farmhouse; 53.79103°N 1.44303°W	—	Late 18th century	The farmhouse is stuccoed, and has a stone slate roof, two storeys and two bays. The doorway has a rectangular fanlight, and the windows are sliding casements.	II
Rose Cottage, Lilac Cottage and Stonecroft; 53.78845°N 1.44542°W	—	Late 18th century	A row of three cottages, they are in brick with stone slate roofs, and two storeys. The doorways have plain surrounds, and the windows are sliding casements with flat brick arches.	II
The Coach House; 53.79592°N 1.44965°W		Late 18th century	Former stables converted for residential use, the building is stuccoed, with a band, and a hipped stone slate roof. There are two storeys, three bays, the middle bay projecting under a pediment, and recessed outer wings. The ground floor contains an arcade of recessed round arches, the middle arch containing a doorway with a fanlight. Above this is a tall round-headed window in an architrave, and the other windows are sashes.	II
The Hawthorns; 53.78802°N 1.44544°W	—	Late 18th century	A brick house with a stone slate roof. There are two storeys, three bays, and a two-bay extension on the right. The doorway has a rectangular fanlight, and the windows are sashes with segmental brick arches.	II
The Poplars and railings 53.78936°N 1.44478°W	—	Late 18th century	The house is in rendered brick, with a stone slate roof, two storeys and four bays. The doorway has a fanlight and a 20th-century surround, and the windows are sashes with moulded surrounds. Attached to the front of the house are cast iron railings.	II
Rose garden wall, Temple Newsam House; 53.78739°N 1.45019°W	—	1798	The wall enclosing the rose garden is in red brick with stone coping, and the north wall is heated. The wall has decorative brickwork with bands and panels. It contains gate piers with pyramidal caps, and wrought iron gates and overthrows with scrolled decoration.	II
Beech House; 53.78825°N 1.44519°W	—	c. 1800	The house is in red brick, stuccoed on the front, with a stone slate roof. There are two storeys, two bays, a recessed two-bay wing on the right, and a further recessed single-storey wing. On the front, the ground floor windows are sashes, in the upper floor they are casements, and in the left return is a canted bay window. The right wing contains a doorway with a fanlight, and segmental-arched openings.	II
Vine Cottage and Yew Tree Cottage; 53.79076°N 1.43727°W	—	c. 1800	A pair of brick cottages with a stone slate roof. There are two storeys, four bays, and two rear outshuts. On the front is a modern glazed porch, and most of the windows are replacement casements with segmental brick arches.	II
16 and 18 Meynell Road, Colton; 53.79075°N 1.44139°W	—	Early 19th century	A pair of brick houses, with a dentilled eaves cornice, and a slate roof with coped gables. There are two storeys, and each house has one bay. The doorways have plain surrounds and fanlights, and the windows are sashes with segmental-arched heads.	II
394 Selby Road, Whitkirk; 53.79769°N 1.44918°W	—	Early 19th century	A house that has been much altered, it is rendered, and has a tile roof. There are two storeys, the windows are sashes, and the door has been replaced.	II
Ash Cottage; 53.78924°N 1.44486°W	—	Early 19th century	A brick cottage with a stone slate roof, two storeys, and two bays. Steps lead up to the central doorway, and the windows are sliding sashes, with segmental brick arches.	II
Colton Cottage; 53.79153°N 1.43896°W	—	Early 19th century	A small house in brown brick, with a stone slate roof, two storeys and two bays. In the centre is a porch and a doorway, and the windows are three-light casements, with brick segmental arches.	II
Colton Lodge; 53.79092°N 1.44234°W	—	Early 19th century	A small brick house that has a slate roof with coped gables. There are two storeys and three bays. In the centre is a doorway, and the windows are sashes, with brick segmental arches.	II
Leafield Cottage; 53.78914°N 1.44509°W	—	Early 19th century	A pair of cottages combined into a house, it is red brick, with paired eaves brackets, and a slate roof. There are two storeys and two bays, and the windows are modern casements with segmental arches.	II
New Row; 53.79148°N 1.43745°W	—	Early 19th century	A terrace of eight houses in red brick with a slate roof. There are two storeys and nine bays, and in the centre is an elliptical-arched carriageway. The doorways have rectangular fanlights, some windows are sashes, and some have been replaced by casements.	II
Park Cottage; 53.78777°N 1.44574°W	—	Early 19th century	Three cottages combined into one house, it is in red brick with a stone slate roof, two storeys and three bays. The three doorways have plain surrounds, and most of the windows are sliding sashes with segmental brick arches.	II
Barn and outbuildings, Park Farm; 53.78726°N 1.44719°W	—	Early 19th century	The farm buildings to the east of the farmhouse include a barn, a granary, stables, and a cart shed. They are in red brick with stone slate roofs, and form an L-shaped plan. The barn has three bays, and the buildings contain segmental-arched openings, doorways, slit vents, square windows, a loading door, and there are two flights of external steps and a dog kennel.	II
Park House; 53.78779°N 1.44615°W	—	Early 19th century	A brick house with a stone slate roof, two storeys and three bays. The central doorway has a fanlight, and a replaced hood on large console brackets, and the windows are three-light casements with segmental brick arches.	II
Park Road Farmhouse and outbuildings 53.79036°N 1.44379°W	—	Early 19th century	The farmhouse and outbuildings are in stone with stone slate roofs and two storeys. The farmhouse has a rendered end wall, three bays, and a central doorway with a plain surround and a fanlight flanked by 20th-century French windows. The outbuildings to the east form an L-shaped plan, and contain small windows, some with segmental brick arches.	II
The Grange; 53.79779°N 1.44852°W	—	Early 19th century	A house, later divided, it is stuccoed, with sill bands, and a hipped slate roof. There are three storeys, three bays, and flanking two-storey two-bay wings. In the centre is a doorway with Tuscan columns, a fanlight, and an entablature, and the windows are sashes.	II
Gate piers, overthrow and railings, The Grange; 53.79788°N 1.44854°W	—	Early 19th century	The gate piers have a square section, recessed panels and pyramidal caps, and between them is a wrought iron overthrow with a lantern frame. The railings have diagonal rails with scrolled finials.	II
Halton Dial Bridge; 53.80125°N 1.48580°W		1830–34	The bridge was built by the Leeds and Selby Railway to carry its line over Selby Road. It is in sandstone and gritstone, and is a skew bridge with a single basket arch. The bridge has stepped voussoirs springing from an impost band, and has string courses and parapets ending in oval piers.	II
Osmondthorpe Subway; 53.79653°N 1.49331°W		1830–34	The bridge was built by the Leeds and Selby Railway to carry its line over a footpath. It is in sandstone and gritstone, and consists of a single basket arch. The bridge has a arch with a keystone, and springs from an impost band. It has string courses, straight wing walls, and parapets ending in piers.	II
Halton Primary School; 53.79749°N 1.46496°W		1842	The school is in stone with a slate roof. There is a single storey and eight bays, the end bays projecting, and the left bay with a coped gable. On the front is a projecting gable with ornate bargeboards, a datestone, and a stone bellcote, behind which is a wooden bell turret. The windows are mullioned, and two are mullioned and transomed and break through the eaves.	II
Pair of chest tombs, St Mary's Church, Whitkirk; 53.79731°N 1.44929°W	—	Mid 19th century	The chest tombs are in the churchyard to the east of the church. They are both in stone, with corner balusters, fielded side panels with paterae, a fluted frieze, and a moulded top slab with fine lettering.	II
Churchyard wall and lychgate, St Mary's Church, Whitkirk; 53.79754°N 1.44990°W		Late 19th century	The churchyard wall encloses the north and east sides of the churchyard, it is in buff sandstone with rounded coping, stepped on the north side, and it contains two pairs of gate piers. The lych gate dates from 1946, and is intended as a memorial to the two World Wars. It has two low stone walls incorporating material from a number of buildings damaged in the Second World War, including the Houses of Parliament. The superstructure is in teak, and the roof is slated. At each end is a wrought iron gate, and inside are two metal plaques with the names of those lost in the wars.	II
Fountain, Temple Newsam House; 53.78366°N 1.45996°W		1896	The fountain is in a pond in a formal garden to the south of the house, and is in cast iron. It has a pedestal with lions' heads in ovals, carrying a bowl on an acanthus leaf stem. From this arise two entwined dolphins with their tails supporting a smaller bowl, over which are two cherubs.	II
St Wilfrid's Church, Halton; 53.79832°N 1.47467°W		1937–39	The church was designed by A. Randall Wells, and is built in gritstone with a flat concrete roof. There is a cruciform plan, consisting of a nave, low north and south aisles, north and south transepts, a chancel with a round apse, and a tower at the crossing. The tower is wooden and octagonal, with gables around its base, louvred openings, and a spire with shingle cladding.	II*
