= St Mary's Church, Whitkirk =

St Mary's Church
- Church of Saint Mary
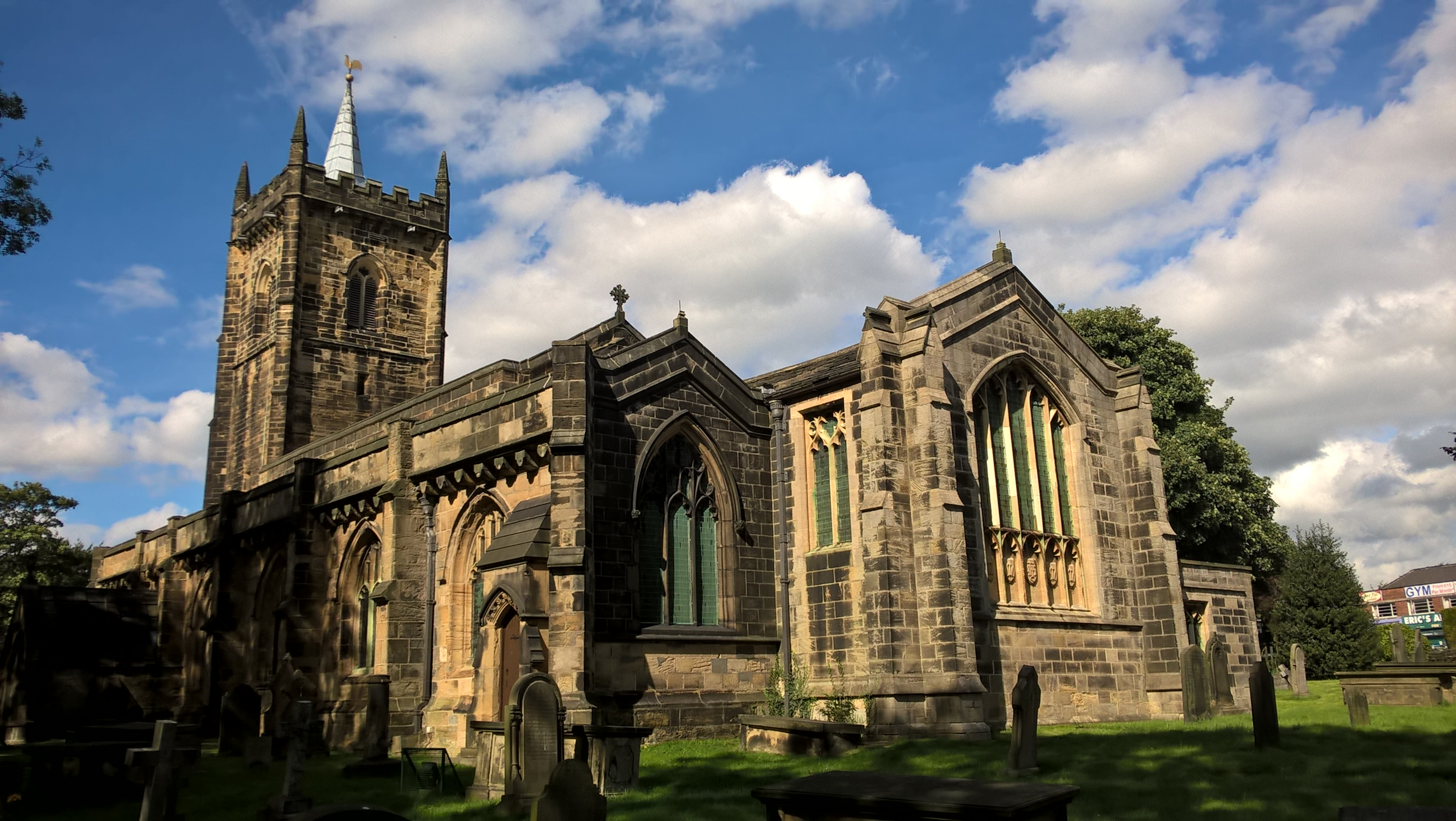
- St Mary's Church
- 53.7973°N 1.4497°W
- OS grid reference: SE364335
- Location: Whitkirk, Leeds, West Yorkshire
- Country: England
- Denomination: Church of England

History
- Status: Parish Church

Architecture
- Heritage designation: Grade I listed building

Administration
- Province: York
- Diocese: Leeds
- Archdeaconry: Leeds
- Parish: Whitkirk

St Mary's Church in Whitkirk, Leeds, West Yorkshire, England is an active Anglican parish church in the archdeaconry of Leeds and the Diocese of Leeds.

== History ==
A church on this site can be dated back to 1185; although the current church is of 15th century origin, it was extensively restored between 1855 and 1856. The chancel was rebuilt in 1901 by G. F. Bodley after which it remained largely unchanged until it was reordered in 1990. It was Grade I listed on 26 September 1963.

== Architectural style ==
=== Exterior ===
The church has a west tower with diagonal buttresses and carved obelisk pinnacles, a two light belfry and a lead-clad spire. There is a heavy nave with aisle parapets. The lychgate, officially opened on 26 June 1949 as a memorial to the dead of the two World Wars, was listed at Grade II in 1976. Stones from St. Paul’s Cathedral, Coventry Cathedral, St Martin-le-Grand Church in York, Leeds Town Hall and Leeds Museum were used in its construction.

=== Interior ===
The church has a short nave with octagonal piers. There is the recumbent tomb of Sir Robert Scargill and his wife with alabaster effigies above. On the north side of the chancel there is the tomb to engineer John Smeaton.

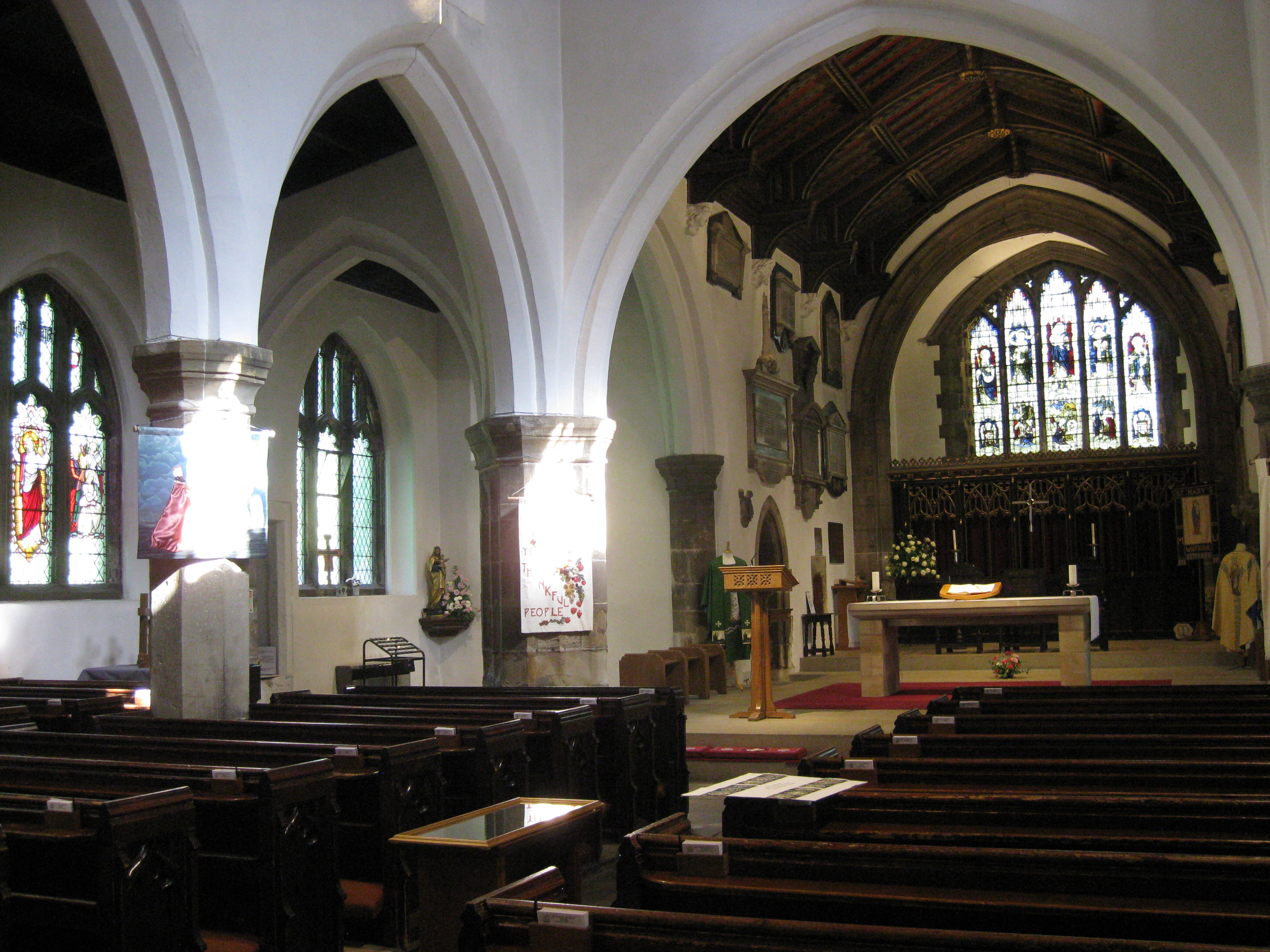
interior

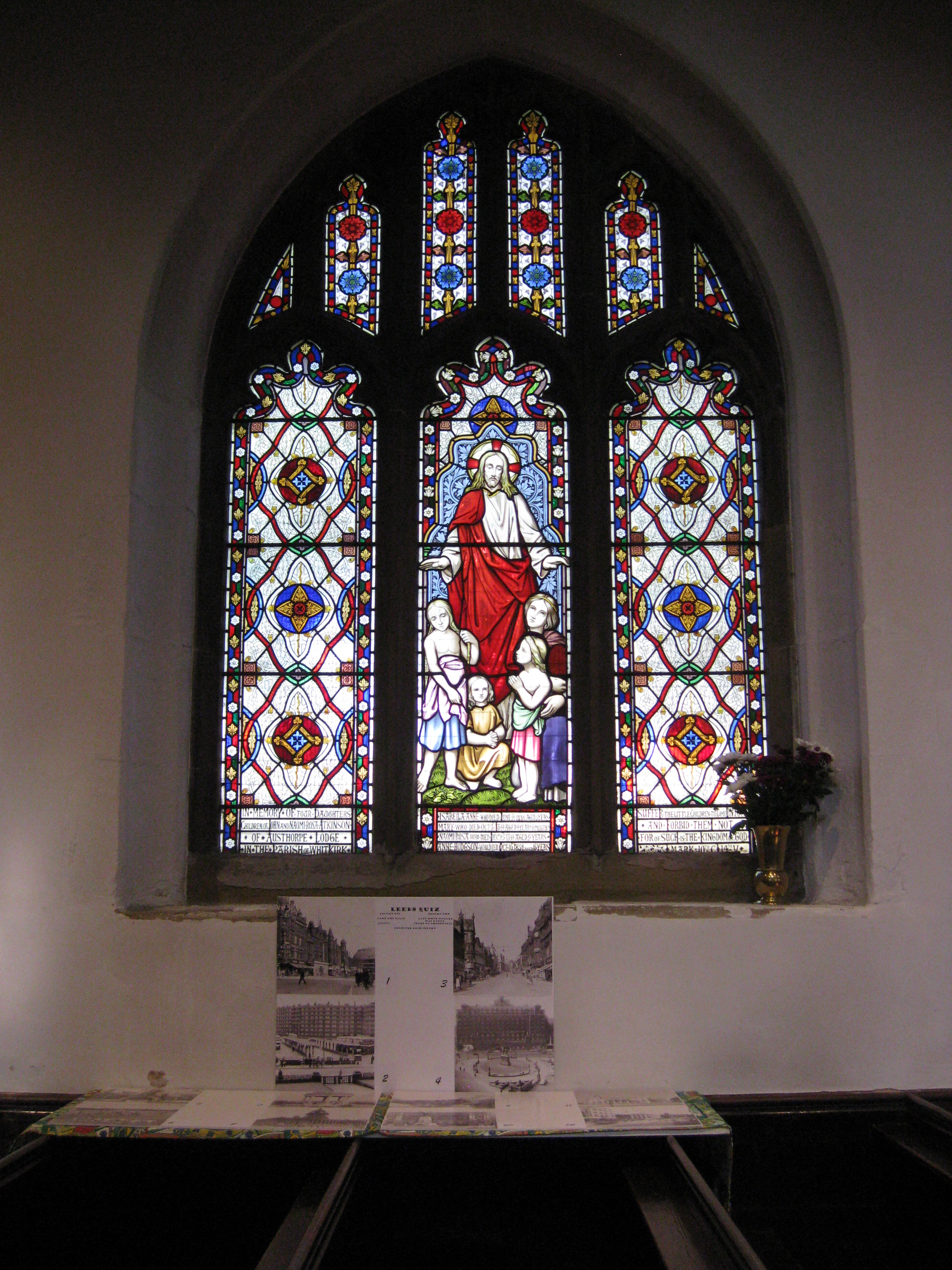
window

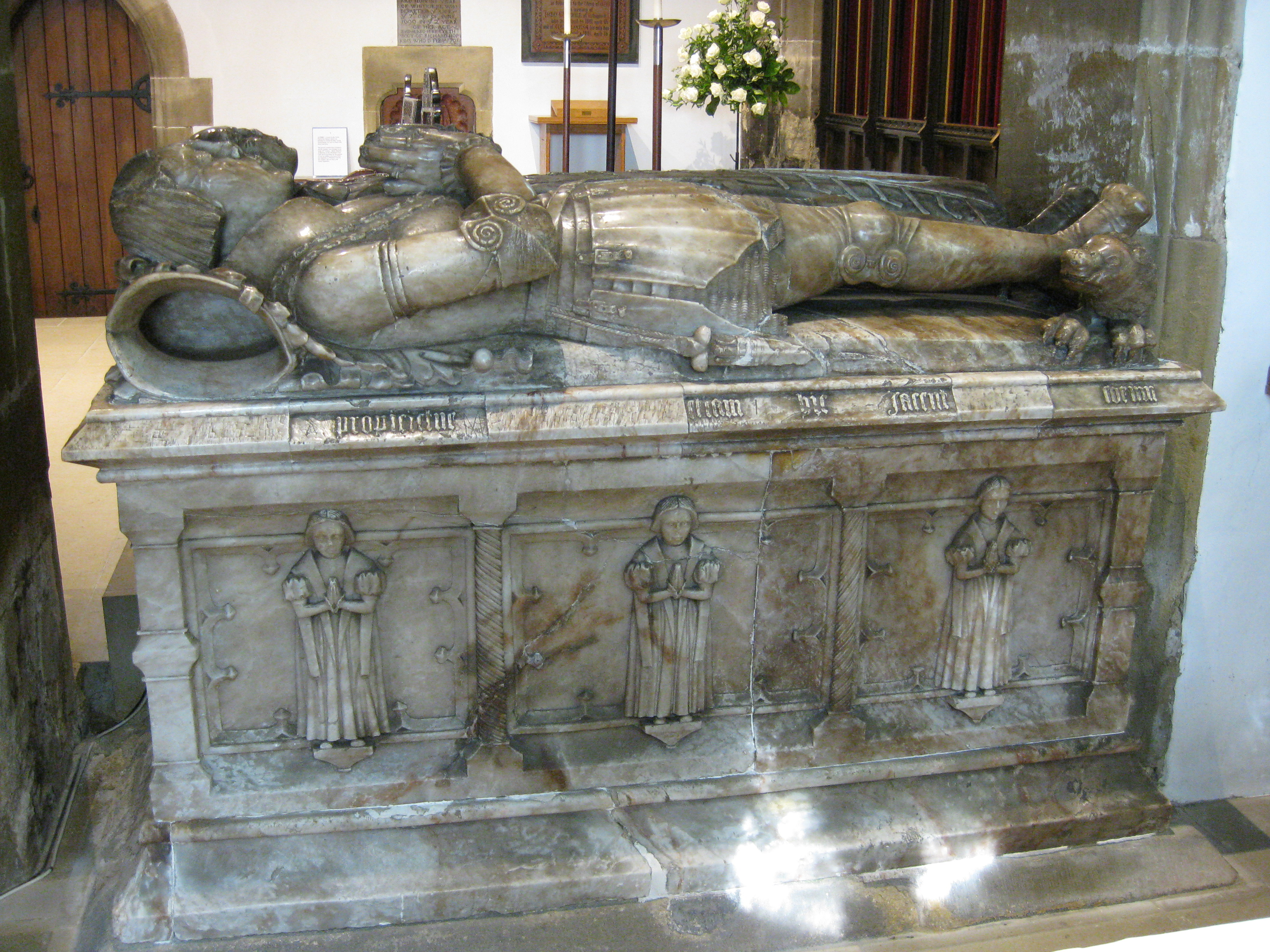
Sir Robert Scargill's tomb

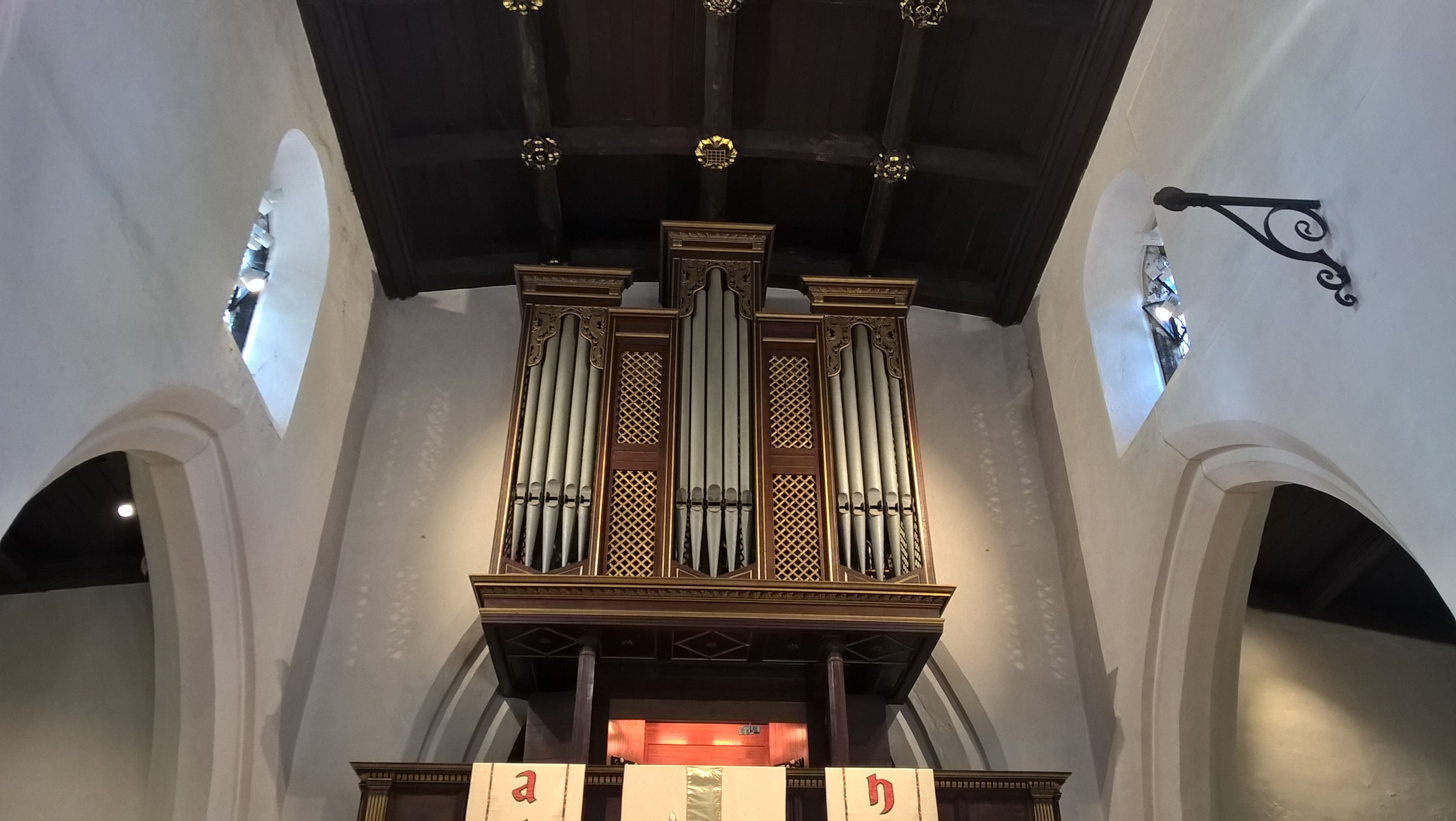
organ

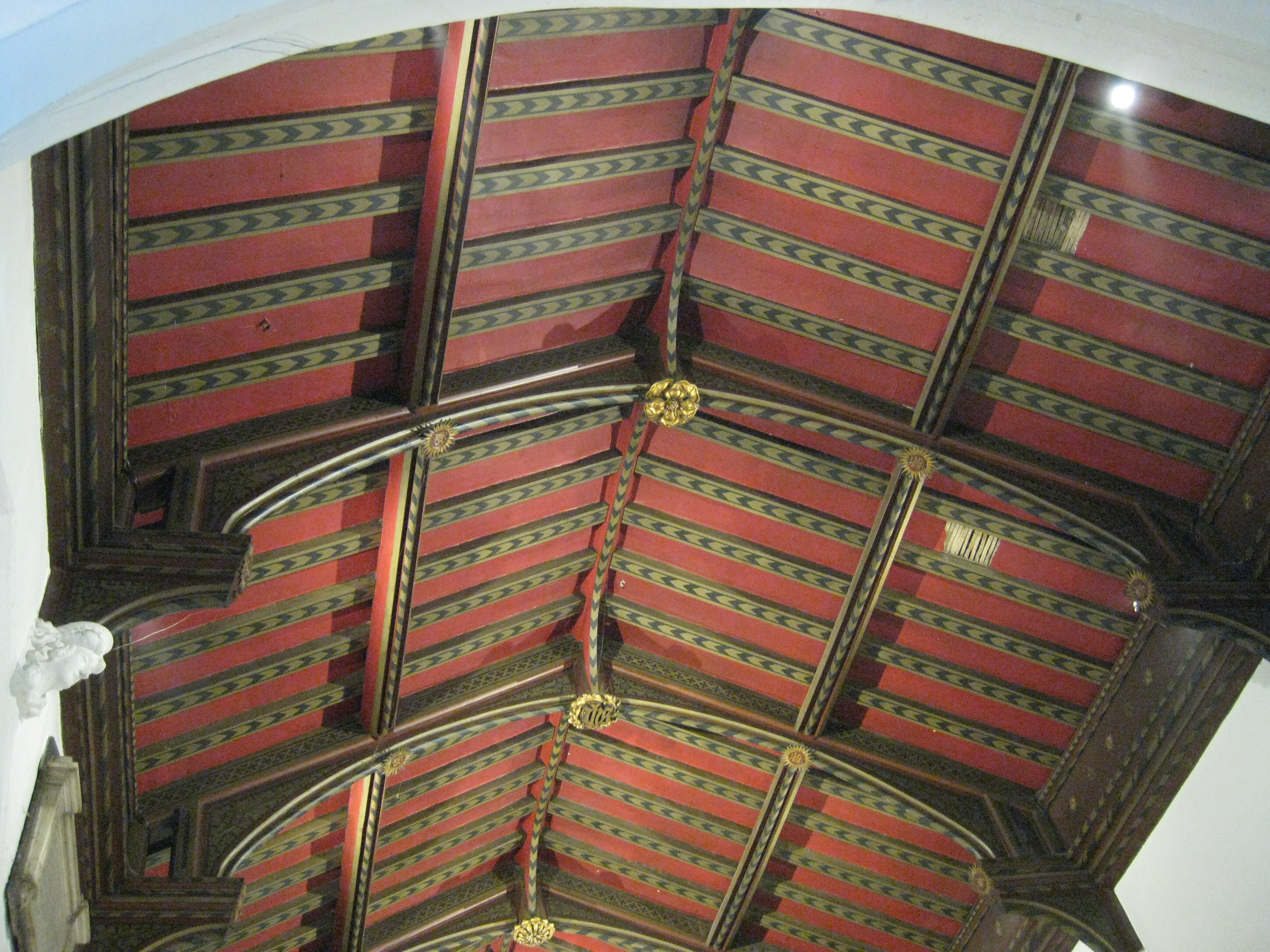
Hammer beam roof

== See also ==
- List of places of worship in the City of Leeds
- Grade I listed churches in West Yorkshire
- Listed buildings in Leeds (Temple Newsam Ward)
