= Colton, Leeds =

District of Leeds, West Yorkshire, England

Coordinates: 53.7930°N 1.4420°W

Colton
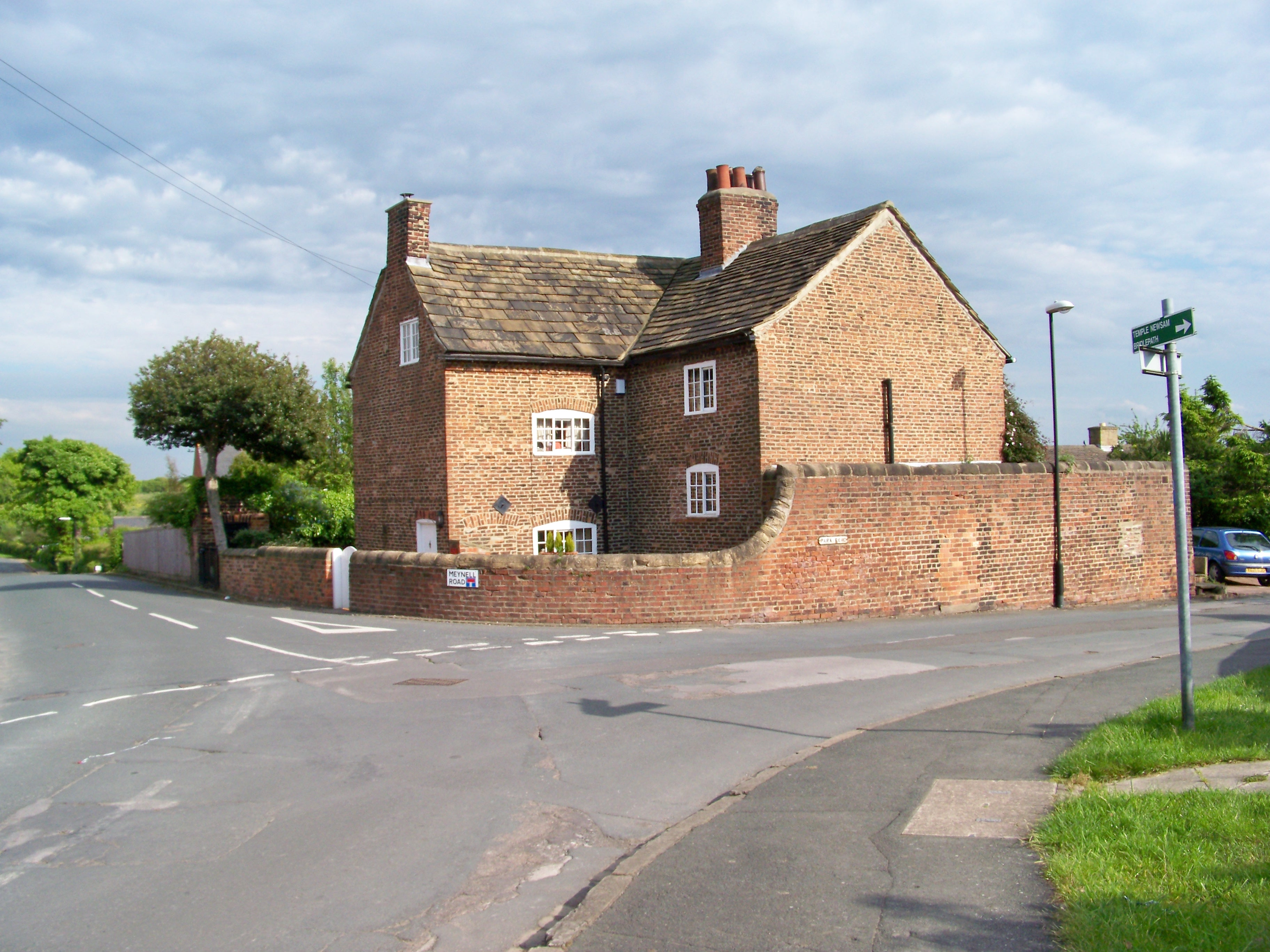
- The Old Village: on the junction of Meynell Road and Park Road, South Colton

- Location within West Yorkshire
- OS grid reference: SE367329
  - London: 168 mi (270 km) SSE
- Metropolitan borough: City of Leeds
- Metropolitan county: West Yorkshire
- Region: Yorkshire and the Humber
- Country: England
- Sovereign state: United Kingdom
- Post town: LEEDS
- Postcode district: LS15
- Dialling code: 0113
- Police: West Yorkshire
- Fire: West Yorkshire
- Ambulance: Yorkshire
- UK Parliament: Leeds East

Colton is a district of east Leeds, West Yorkshire, England, situated between Cross Gates to the north, Halton and Halton Moor to the west, Whitkirk to the north-west and Austhorpe to the north-east. Temple Newsam lies directly south of the estate.

The area falls within the Temple Newsam ward of Leeds City Council and Leeds East parliamentary constituency.

The small Whitkirk Lane End estate (which is situated between Colton Road and Colton Roundabout) is often considered more part of the Colton district than Whitkirk, because of its separation from Whitkirk via Selby Road, and its proximity to Colton Road.

== Etymology ==
The name of Colton is first attested the Domesday Book of 1086 as Coletun. The name comes from Old English. The first element is the personal name Cola (which originated as a nickname deriving from Old English col 'coal', referring to black hair or dark complexion), and the second is the word tūn ('estate, farm'). Thus the name once meant 'Cola's estate'.

== Geography ==
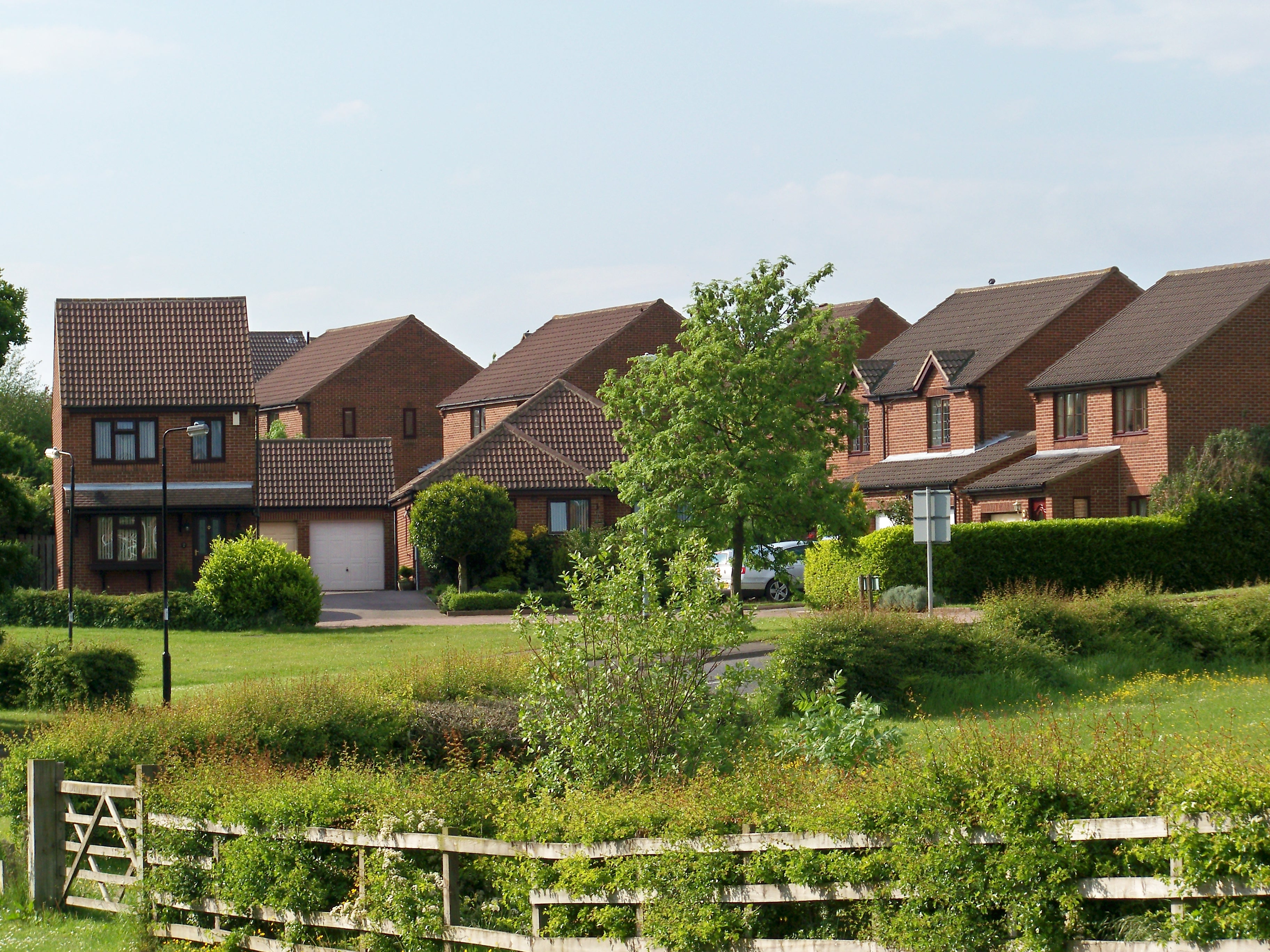
Newer houses in Colton

The village consists mainly of cul-de-sacs, with inter-linking ginnels, back alleys and housing ranges from detached houses, semi-detached houses, terraced houses, and flats. The area is 4 miles to the east of Leeds city centre, and is close to the A63 dual carriageway and M1 motorway. Colton is also the area of Leeds where the Leeds Outer Ring Road terminates. The area is served by buses, with the number 19A going to and from the city centre every 40 minutes and the 19 served hourly on an evening.

At the centre of the estate, there is a cricket club, with a bar, a cricket pitch, two tennis courts, crown green bowling club and a football pitch. Much of the open space in Colton has been built upon, making it a much more urban area. Colton Methodist Church is situated in the "old" part of the village.

== Old Colton Road ==
Colton Road is a derelict road running through the west of the area into Whitkirk. It joins onto Selby Road, although it has been closed from the edge of Colton and Whitkirk to Meynell Road, where it terminates in the centre of the estate. It is locally referred to as 'The Old Road', 'The Red Road' or 'The Wide Path'.

== See also ==
- Listed buildings in Leeds (Temple Newsam Ward)
