= Whitkirk =

Suburb of Leeds, West Yorkshire, England

Coordinates: 53.800°N 1.450°W

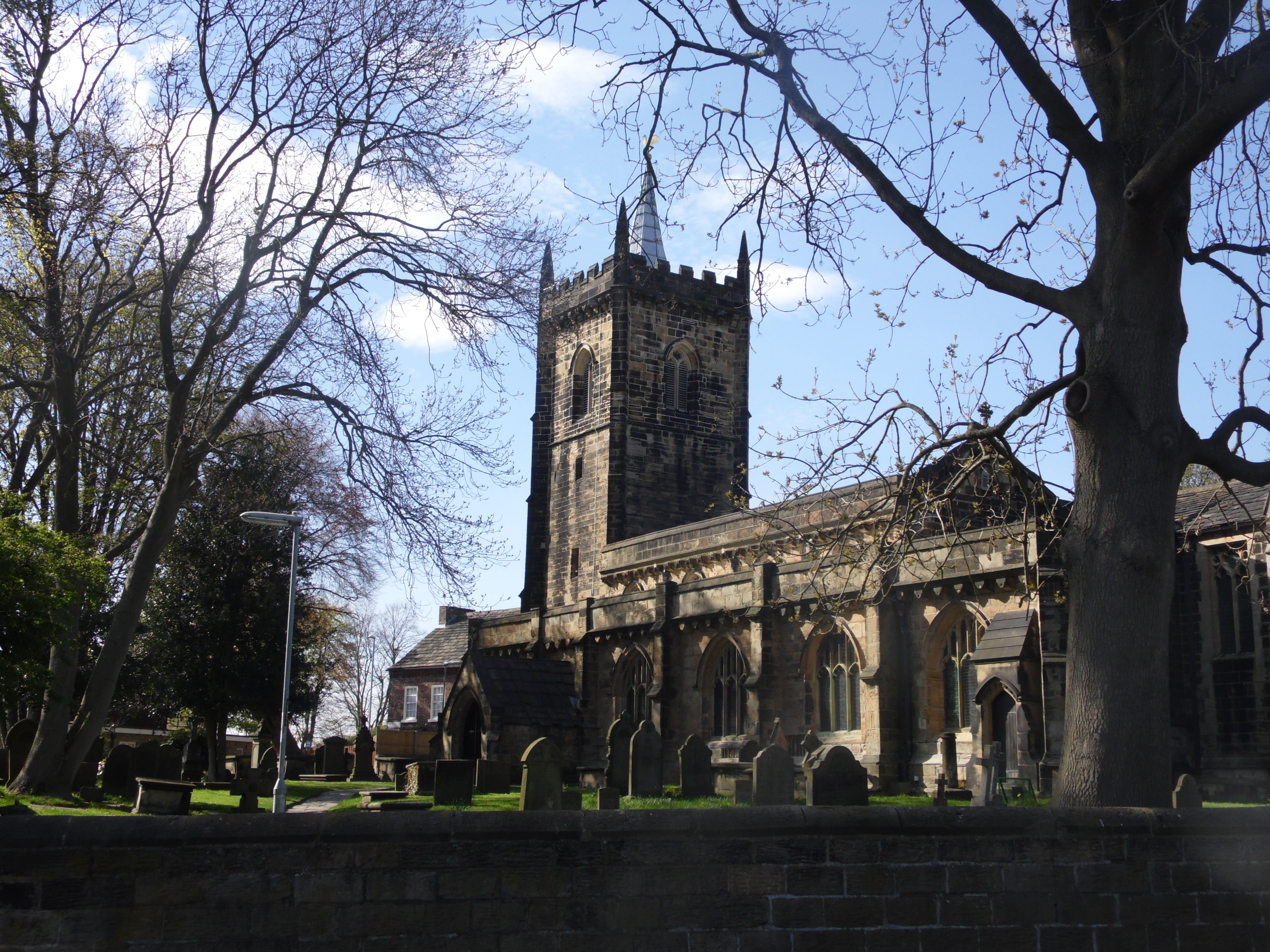
- St Mary's Church, Whitkirk

- Location within West Yorkshire
- OS grid reference: SE 363 339
- Metropolitan borough: City of Leeds
- Metropolitan county: West Yorkshire
- Region: Yorkshire and the Humber
- Country: England
- Sovereign state: United Kingdom
- Post town: LEEDS
- Postcode district: LS15
- Dialling code: 0113
- Police: West Yorkshire
- Fire: West Yorkshire
- Ambulance: Yorkshire
- UK Parliament: Leeds East

Whitkirk is a suburb of east Leeds, England. It is situated between Cross Gates to the north, Austhorpe to the east, Killingbeck to the west, Colton to the south-east and Halton to the south-west. The Temple Newsam estate lies directly south of the area.

It falls into the Temple Newsam ward of Leeds City Council and Leeds East parliamentary constituency.

== History ==
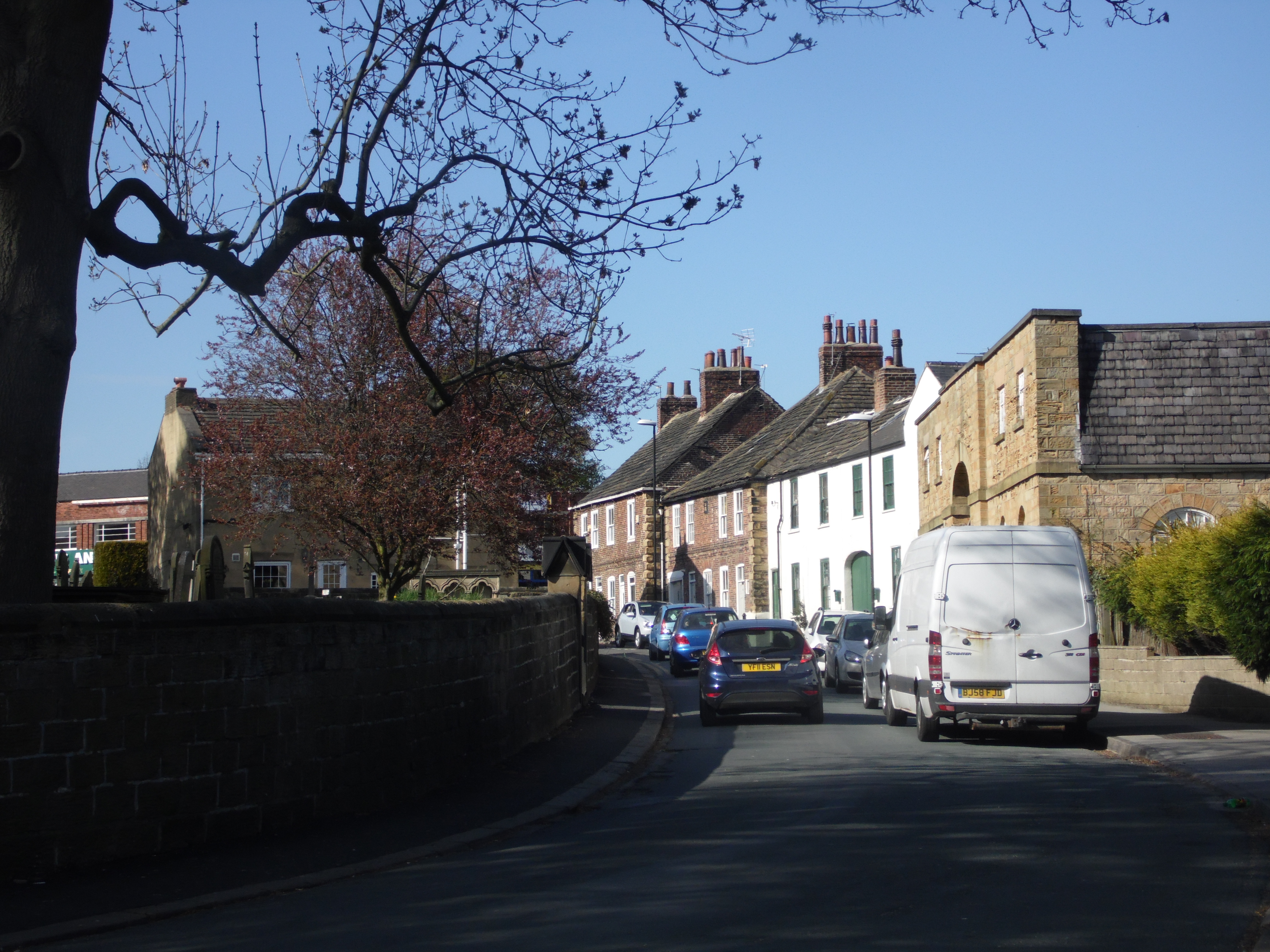
Character properties on Colton Road

A church is recorded in the Domesday Survey (1086) as belonging to the manor of Gipton and Colton, and as Whitkirk is the only known medieval church in these area of Leeds, it is reasonable to assume that it is an earlier building replaced by the current Whitkirk church which is being referred to. This would suggest there was a late Anglo-Saxon church at least. The first mention of Whitkirk itself was in 1154–66, in the Early Yorkshire Charters referring to "Witechirche", meaning "white church". The name has Old English origins, with the 'chirche' element subsequently being replaced by the Old Norse 'kirkja'. It is possible that the church was the focus of settlement activity at this period extending into the later medieval era.

Hollyshaw Lane, which links Whitkirk with Cross Gates, was formerly known as "Allershaw", referring to local alder trees (cf. the derivation of the name of Chapel Allerton, another Leeds suburb). The lane originally led northwards from Whitkirk to Seacroft.

The renowned civil engineer John Smeaton was born in the local parish of Austhorpe and is buried in Whitkirk churchyard.

== Information ==
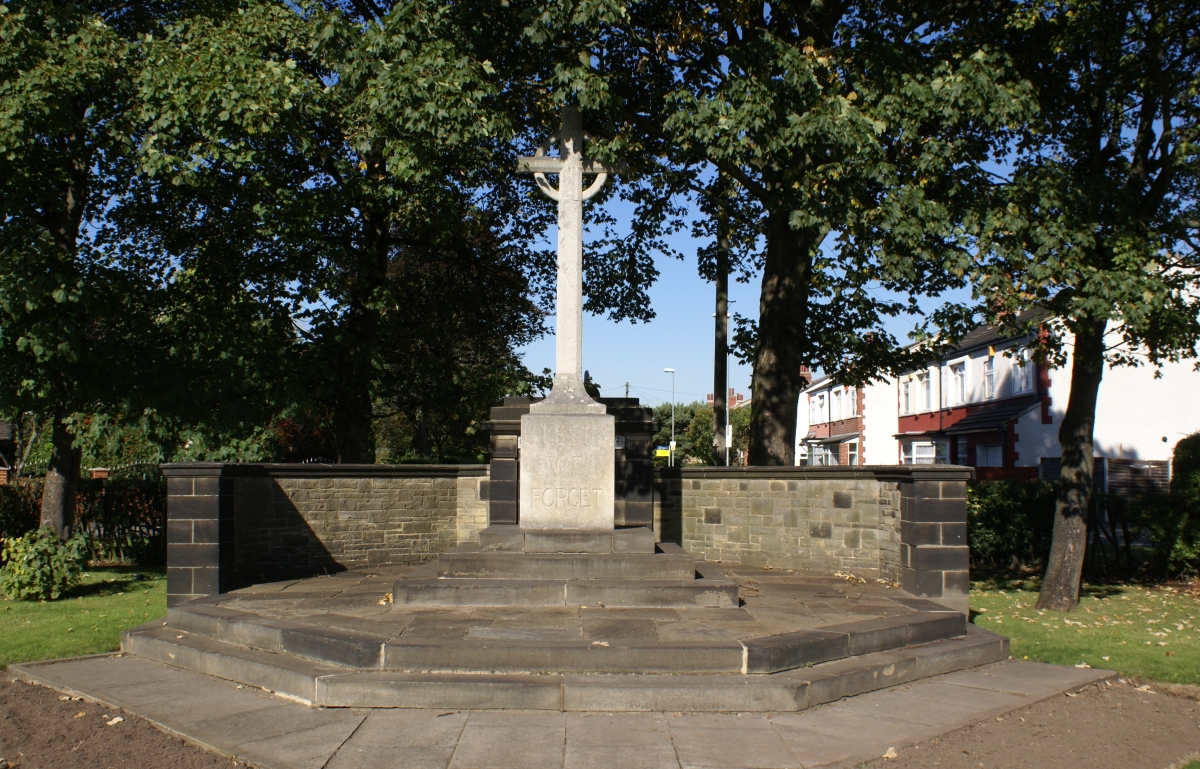
Temple Newsam War Memorial

Whitkirk is 4 miles (6 km) east of Leeds city centre, and about 1-mile (1.6 km) from Cross Gates Railway Station, which has services to Leeds City station and York railway station, and is close to the A63 dual carriageway and M1 motorway, meaning it is an ideal location for commuters. The area is well served by regular buses. The area has a cricket club which has a large cricket pitch, five tennis courts, a football pitch and a crown green bowling green, along with a large bar area. Housing in Whitkirk ranges from detached houses, semi-detached houses and terraced houses. It is also home to a Premier Inn, directly next to the Brown Cow public house, a gym, a Co-op, a carpet shop, an undertaker and an estate agent. The Temple Newsam War Memorial can be found a few hundred yards along Selby Road towards Halton.

== Education ==
Whitkirk has three schools: Whitkirk Primary School, Temple Newsam Halton Primary School, and Temple Moor High School. The former Darcy hospital school was located on Hollyshaw Lane.

== Comparison ==
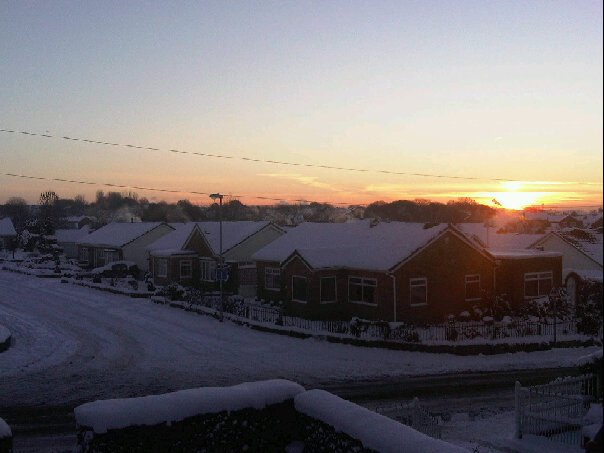
A view over Whitkirk in winter, looking towards Colton

Whitkirk lies within the LS15 postcode area. Here is a population breakdown of the postcode area in comparison with the UK population.

Category	LS15	UK average
Population density (people / sq mi)	43.2	24.9
Gender split (females / male)	1.05	1.05
Average commute	6.1 miles	8.73 miles
Average age	38	39
Home ownership	16%	16.9%
Student population	2.4%	4.4%
People in good health	69%	69%

== See also ==
- Listed buildings in Leeds (Temple Newsam Ward)
