= Cross Gates =

Suburb in east Leeds, West Yorkshire, England

Coordinates: 53.806346°N 1.450575°W

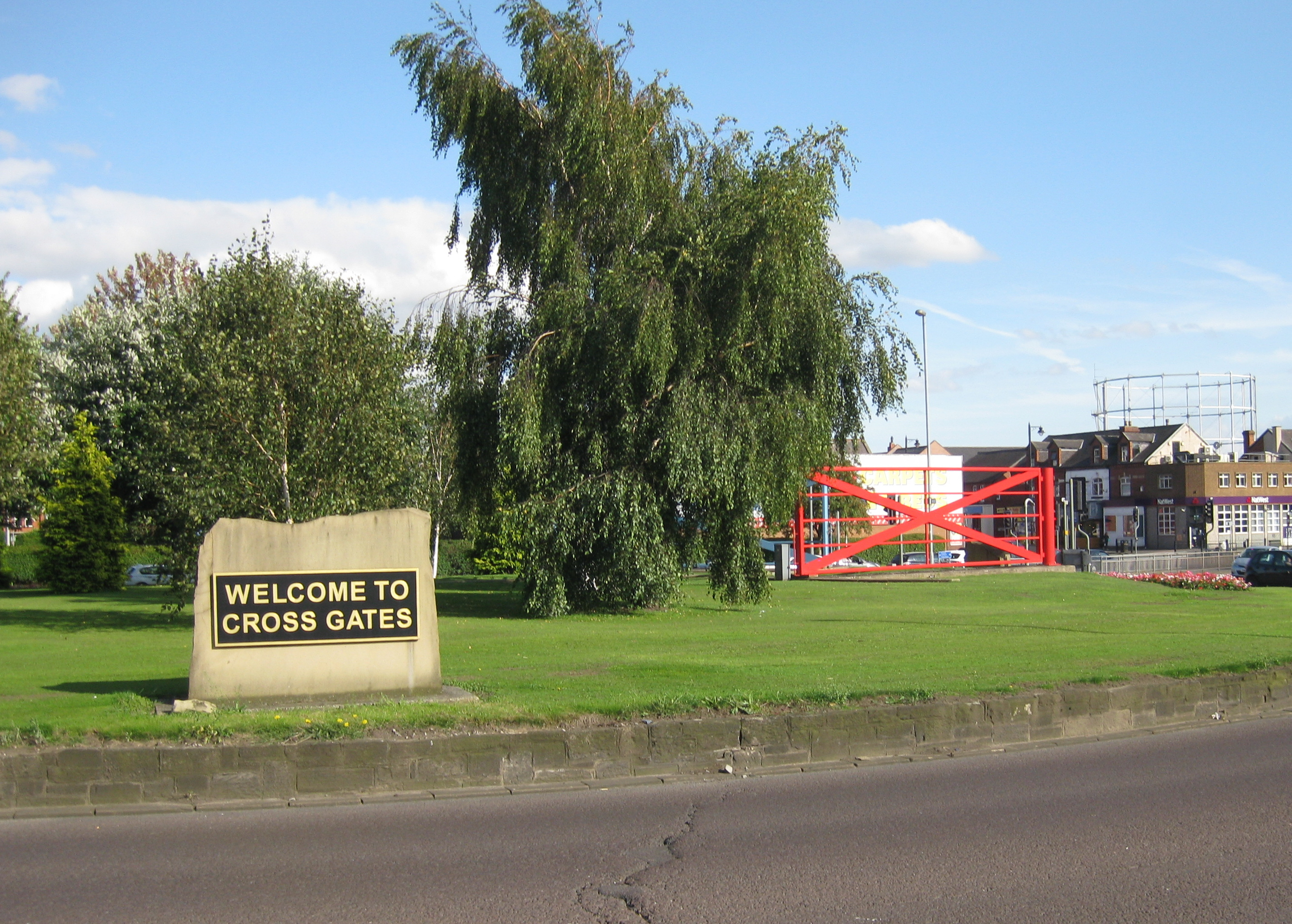
- Welcome to Cross Gates roundabout with Cross Gates Sculpture

- Location within West Yorkshire
- Population: 7,770
- OS grid reference: SE362345
- Metropolitan borough: City of Leeds
- Metropolitan county: West Yorkshire
- Region: Yorkshire and the Humber
- Country: England
- Sovereign state: United Kingdom
- Post town: LEEDS
- Postcode district: LS15
- Dialling code: 0113
- Police: West Yorkshire
- Fire: West Yorkshire
- Ambulance: Yorkshire
- UK Parliament: Leeds East

Cross Gates (often spelled Crossgates) is a suburb in east Leeds, West Yorkshire, England.

The area sits between Seacroft and Swarcliffe to the north, Whitkirk and Colton to the south, Killingbeck to the west and Austhorpe to the south east. Manston and Pendas Fields are also generally regarded as part of Cross Gates. It serves as an important transport hub for the nearby large housing estates of Seacroft, Whinmoor and Gipton.

At the 2011 census, Cross Gates had a population of 7,770, situated in the Cross Gates & Whinmoor ward of Leeds City Council with a population of 22,099.

== Location ==
The suburb is 4 miles (6 km) to the east of Leeds city centre and lies in the LS15 Leeds postcode area.

== Etymology ==
Historically, Cross Gates straddled the boundary of the ancient Parishes of Barwick in Elmet and Whitkirk.

According to the English Place-Name Society, the name Cross Gates in Seacroft township (within Whitkirk Parish) is first reliably attested in 1771 and is therefore unlikely to be an old name. In the Society's analysis, the word gates appears here in the dialect meaning 'roads', and so meant 'crossroads'.

The Society also discovered the name much earlier within the records of Barwick in Elmet Parish, ‘the Cross yeates’ noted in 1680 in the Parish Register of Barwick. Their analysis of this entry in the old English dialect was ‘geat’ meaning gate or opening, and so meant ‘cross gates’. The entries are not cross referenced by the Society.

Antiquarians Platt & Morkhill writing in 1893 mention a document from 1457 which lists the assets of one Sir John Darcey and mentions a "cross gate" near Whitkirk: 'unde mete eiusdem ville [Colton] incipiunt apud le Crosyate stans apud le Gildwell'. But this seems simply to denote a crossroads rather than being a place-name).

== History ==
The first references in the Whitkirk St. Marys Parish Register are from the 1630s:

- Burial : 1630 July 26 - Thomas Norton, of Crosyeate
- Burial : 1632 Mar 10 - widowe [sic] Norton, of Crosyeate

The earliest references in the Barwick in Elmet All Saints Parish Registers are from 1679 & 1680:

- Burial : Matthew, the son of Joshuah Lumb, at the cross Yeates on the Lower end on Hirst more, 24 March 1679
- Baptism : Isable, the daughter of Joshuah Lumbe, at the Cross yates, on the Hurst moor, 18 July 1680

(Note : In both Whitkirk and Barwick Parish Registers there are few entries which include detailed locations in entries prior to these dates)

Historically, Cross Gates was located at the boundary of the ancient Parishes of Barwick in Elmet and Whitkirk. The line was roughly where Station Road lies today with everything to the north east in Barwick in Elmet and the south west in Whitkirk. For hundreds of years it comprised no more than one or two cottages on the southern edge of the wastes of Whinmoor in an area called Low Moor or Hirst Moor.

A September 1628 survey of the boundaries of Whinmoor contains the earliest reference to Cross Gates within a description of the western extent of this moor and common land : “….along the out hedges of the said fields to Alley Shawe lane end (now known as Hollyshaw Lane) and the out hedges of holdike beinge the grounde of Nicholas Moor gent within the Mannor of Austhropp, and thence northwards alonge the outhedges of Crosse yates Closes and soe alonge the outhedges of Seacroft field to Potter yaite from there alonge the out hedge of Seacroft unto the bull layne ende (now the area of the A64 / B6902 Seacroft roundabout) and soe along the hedges unto Cuthbert house in Roundhey and…”.

Access across Whinmoor was controlled by an ancient toll or chiminage, first mentioned in 1424-5 and commoners rights to pasture animals on the moorland was also jealously guarded with a number of Court cases taking place to remove animals from trespassers, including the Rector of Barwick-in-Elmet in 1579.

When Whinmoor was enclosed under the Barwick-in-Elmet Inclosure Act 1796 (36 Geo. 3. c. 95 Pr.) regular sized fields were created and access roads built. The long straight Austhorpe Road was constructed in 1804 under this inclosure act. According to Platt and Morkhill, writing in the 19th century, "At the commencement of this century Cross Gates consisted only of some sixteen cottages, built near a gate which crossed the road leading from Whitkirk to Seacroft, then merely a by-lane, about fifty yard north of the small piece of ground now called Cross Gates Green. The use of this gate, we believe, was to prevent the cattle pastured on the adjacent common from straying down the lane. By the side of the gate stood a small cottage for the gatekeeper".

The Waud family started coal mining along old Manston Lane in 1811 and in 1827 in the area by Cross Gates Shopping Centre. Further pits were built on Church Lane and the area now occupied by the Marshall's. The Leeds and Selby Railway was constructed in 1834 passing through Cross Gates and trackways were built from the railway along Church Lane to the pits. The district was then rapidly expanding. The Traveller's Rest Public House (then on the corner of Station Road and Austhorpe Road) opened in the 1860s. The first Manston St. James C of E church was built in 1848 saving local residents the long trek to either Barwick in Elmet or Whitkirk. The first school was built in 1857 on Austhorpe Road in the area now occupied by "The Arcade". A Methodist Chapel opened in 1882 again on Austhorpe Road.

The local coal pits closed in 1882 and Cross Gates started to turn into a 'commuter village'. At this time Cross Gates was 'well removed' from the Leeds city centre and the factories and so Cross Gates began to attract Leeds' more affluent residents who could use the railway to quickly access the city.

In the twentieth century Cross Gates effectively became a suburb of Leeds, with the open fields in between being developed into housing. This also led to much development around Cross Gates, including the building of the Cross Gates estate, a development of council housing and private development around Austhorpe, Whitkirk and Manston.

=== Barnbow Tragedy ===
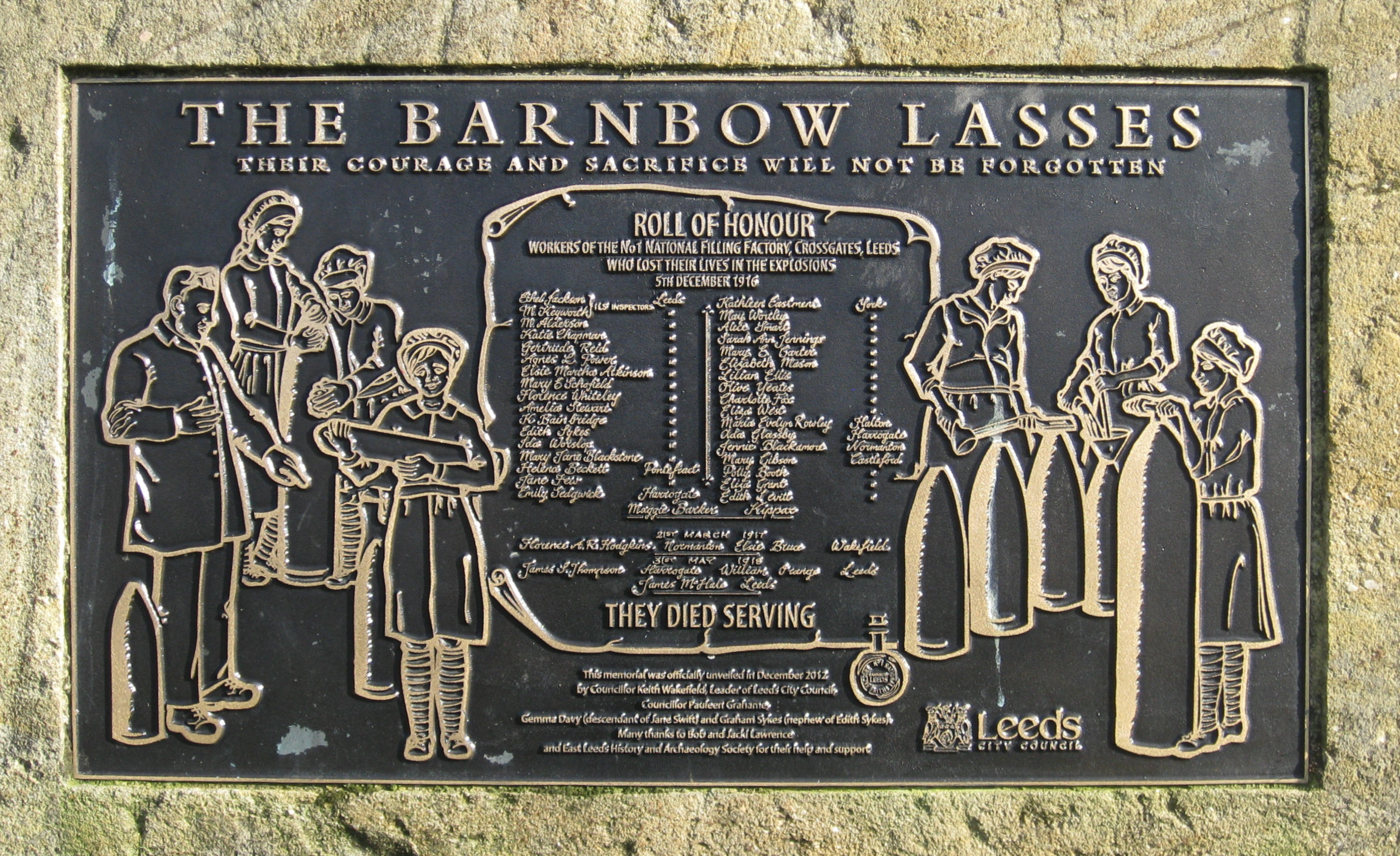
Memorial plaque in Manston Park

The worst tragedy ever to happen within Leeds (in terms of fatalities) was the Barnbow tragedy of 5 December 1916. 35 workers (all women aged 14 or over) were killed in the Barnbow Munitions Factory, which later became ROF Barnbow. The plant employed 16,000 workers, from Leeds, Selby, Wakefield, Tadcaster and Wetherby and had its own railway station to cope with the daily influx of workers. The railway station had an 850-foot (260 m) platform and 38 special trains from surrounding towns and cities. An explosion from Hall 42 killed 35 workers and mutilated many more. Mechanic William Parking was presented with an engraved silver watch for his bravery in saving factory workers during the incident. There are two memorials: one in Manston Park and one on Cross Gates Road by the roundabout with the Ring Road.

== Housing ==
The area's housing includes detached houses, semi-detached houses and terraced houses. A block of new low-rise flats has been built opposite the Crossgates Shopping Centre, and apartments are being sold and rented at very high prices. Austhorpe Road and the areas surrounding Marshall Street are made up largely of Victorian through terraces. There are some upmarket Victorian villas around Tranquility Avenue.

== Manston Park ==
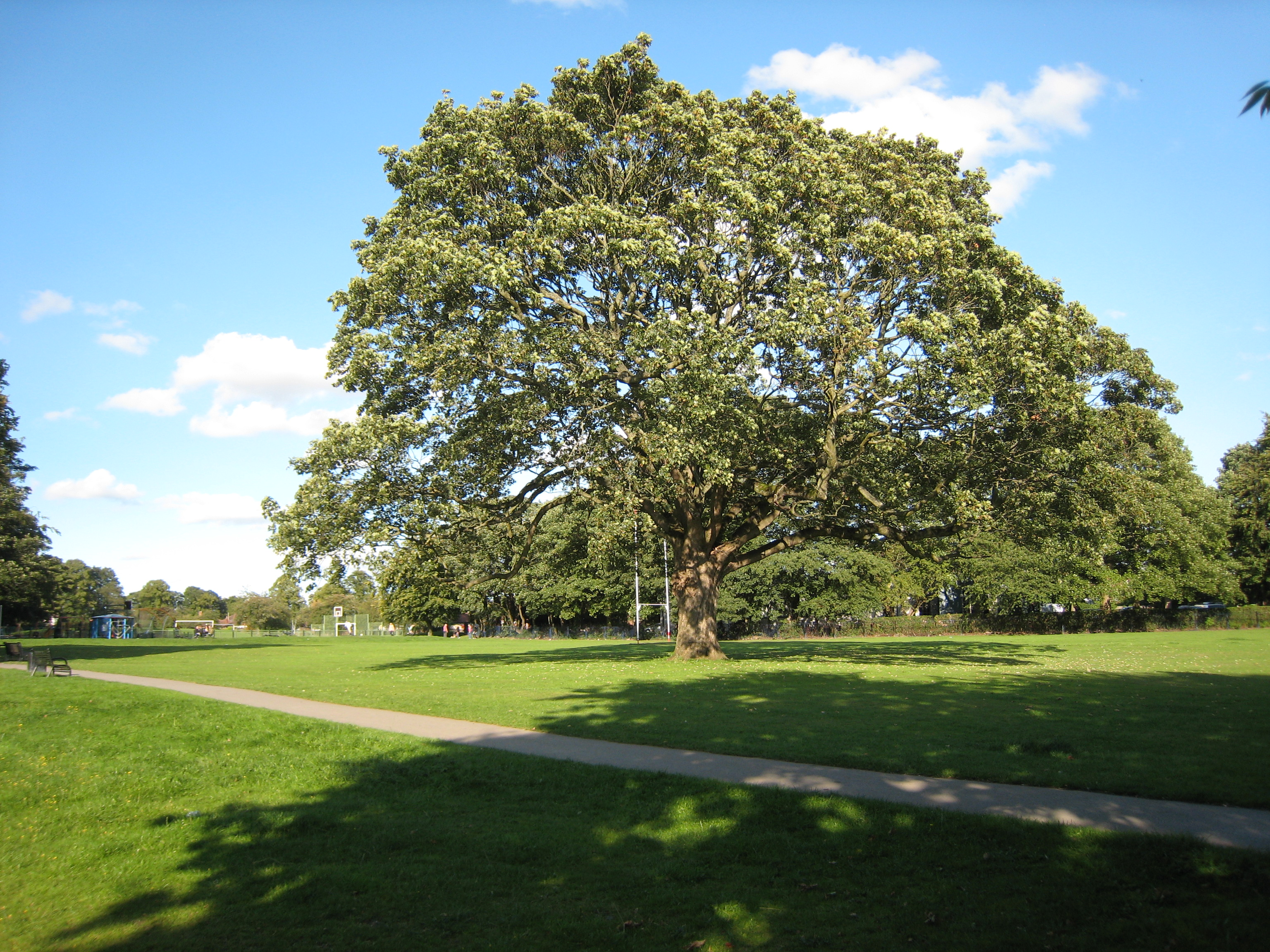
Manston Park.

Manston Park is a large park in Cross Gates with football pitches, a bowling green, tennis courts and a playground. It is owned and managed by Leeds City Council and was opened in August 1925.

== Transport ==
Cross Gates railway station is on the Leeds to Selby line, now part of the York and Selby Lines in the timetables. It is a well used stop for residents commuting to Leeds or York city centres. In June 2006 Cross Gates won the award for "Best Kept Railway Station" in all of Yorkshire, having made major strides in the refurbishment of the station.

Cross Gates is also close to the A64 dual carriageway and the M1. The A6120 Leeds Outer Ring Road "Station Road" is the main road through the area. The 650 metre "Manston Lane Link Road" (MLLR), which forms part of the East Leeds Orbital Road (ELOR), is intended to connect a new area of Leeds called the "East Leeds Extension" (ELE), through a new commercial development at Thorpe Park to the M1 over the Leeds/York railway line.

== Industry ==
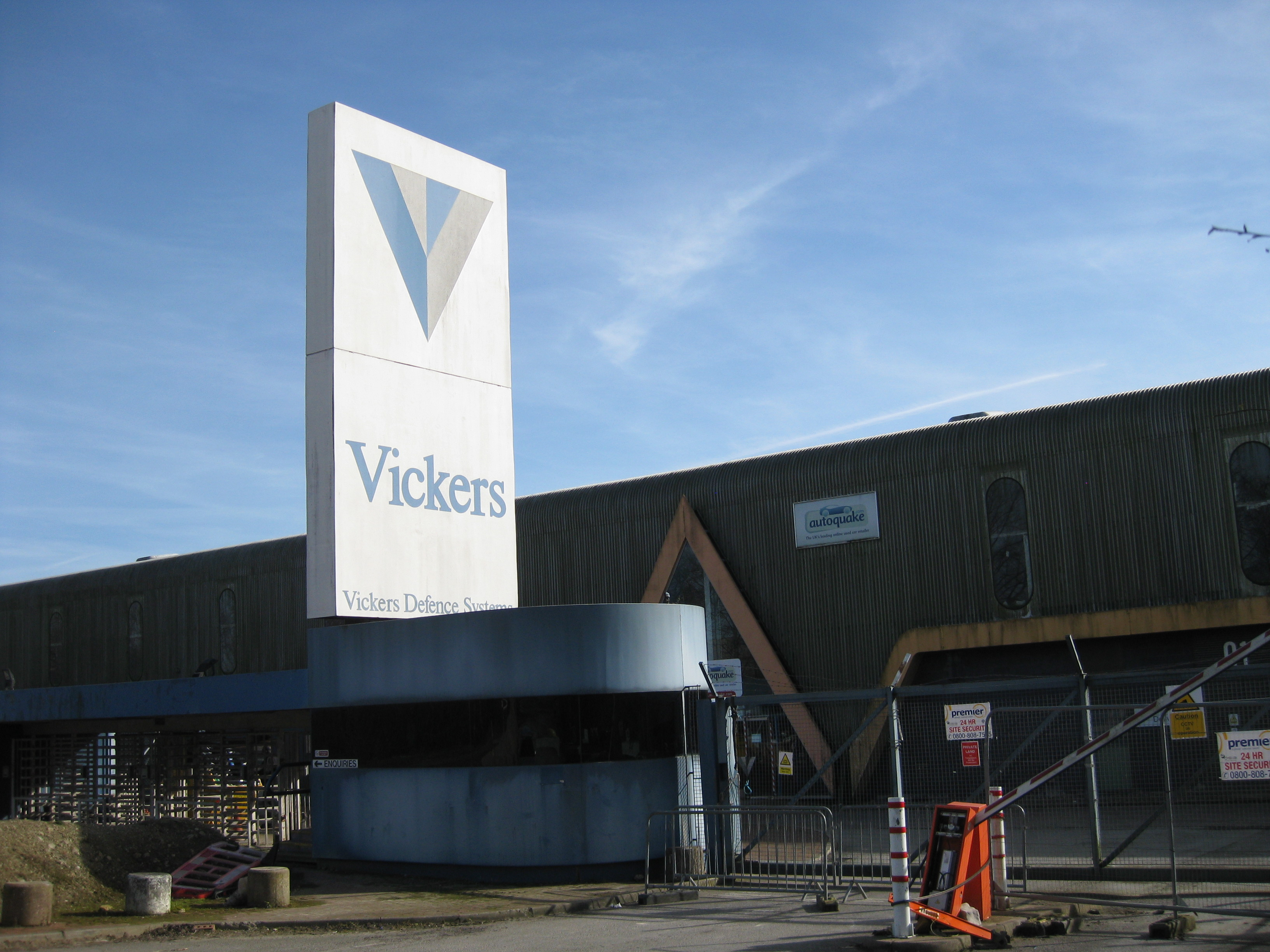
Vickers factory (closed)

A Royal Ordnance Factory, ROF Leeds, was built at Barnbow, off Manston Lane, producing guns and ammunition for the army and navy. The building was bought by Vickers Defence Systems and produced the Challenger 2 tank before it closed in 2004. After several years of being used for storage, the building was demolished in 2018.

Bus manufacturer Optare, formerly Charles H Roe, also had a factory on Manston Lane before it closed in 2011 and production was moved to Sherburn in Elmet.

The haulage company J Long & Sons are based on Sandleas Way.

Major printer and direct mail company Communisis has its main site on Manston Lane.

== 'Gates' sculpture ==
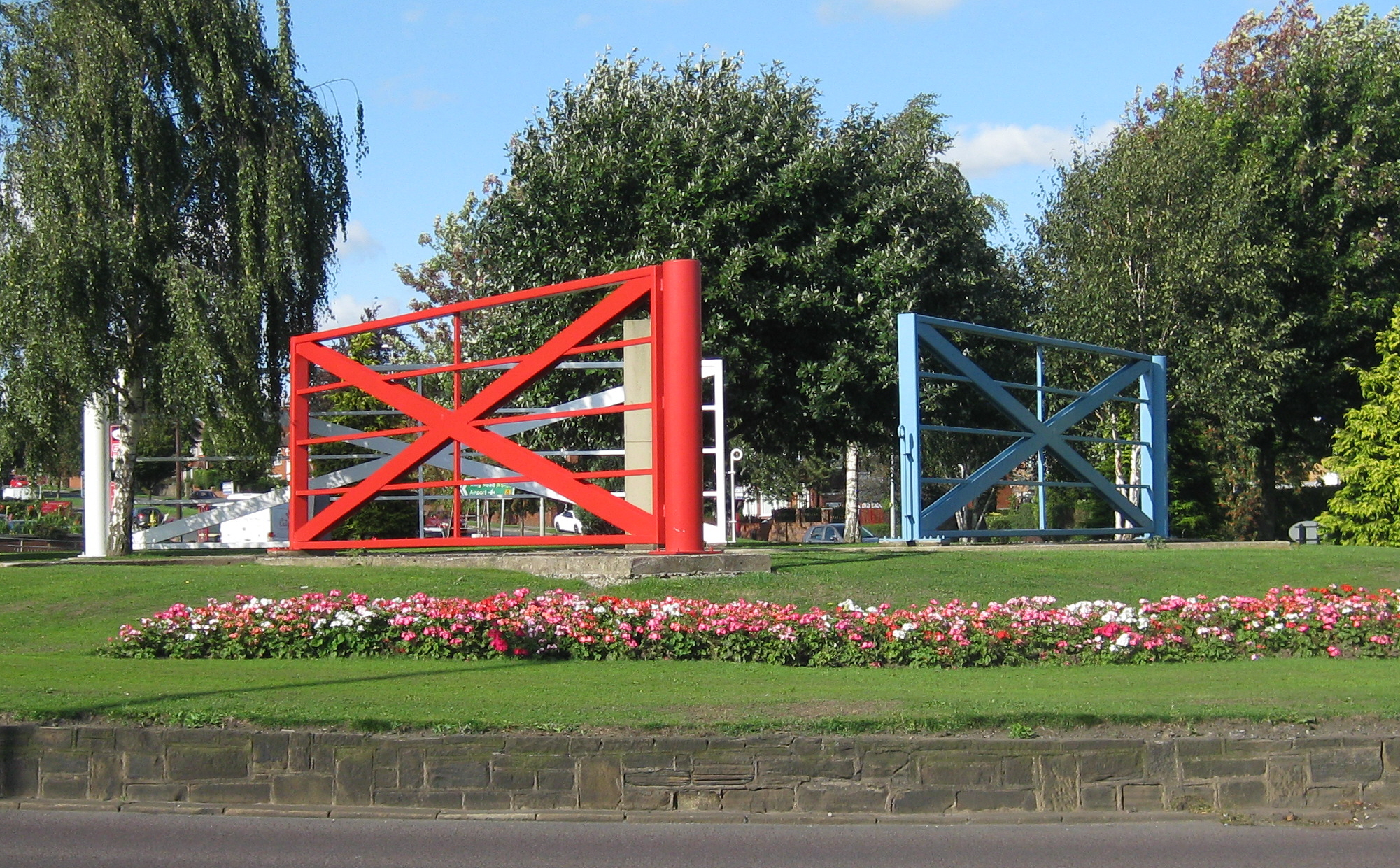
Cross Gates sculpture

In 2009 the council developed the roundabout on the Leeds Ring Road on the north side with 3 stone signs saying "Welcome to Cross Gates" and a sculpture composed of 3 large metal gates by architect John Thorp, at a cost of £143,000. They were originally painted red, black and white, but this was changed to the present red, blue and silver, as the original colours are those of Manchester United. The sculpture is meant to represent Cross Gates metaphorically, each gate having a large 'X' in steel in its design to reflect the history of the town's name. Local residents have expressed different views on the structure, some finding it an asset to the area, others finding it an eyesore.

== Comparison ==
Cross Gates lies in the LS15 postcode area. Here is a population breakdown of the postcode area in comparison with the UK population.

Category	LS15	UK average
Population density (people/sq mi)	43.2	24.9
Gender split (female/male)	1.05	1.05
Average commute	6.1 miles	8.73 miles
Average age	38	39
Home ownership	16%	16.9%
Student population	2.4%	4.4%
People in good health	69%	69%
