= Randall Wells =

English architect (1877–1942)

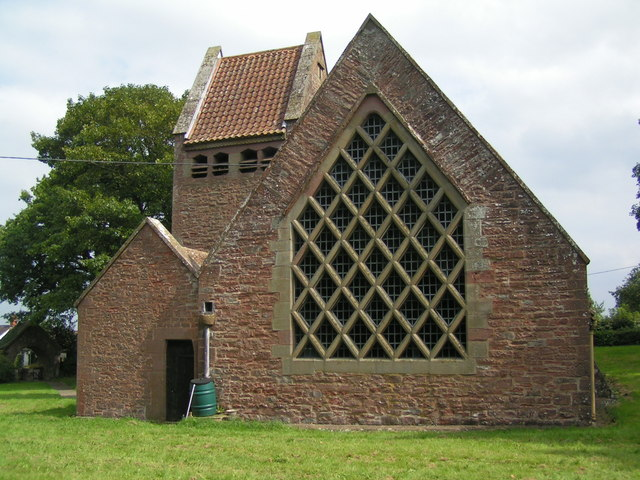
St Edward's Church, Kempley (1903–04)

Albert Randall Wells (1877–1942) was an English Arts and Crafts architect, designer, craftsman and inventor.

He was the son of an architect, Arthur Wells of Hastings. After a practical training in joinery and founding as well as architecture, Randall Wells was discovered by William Lethaby and acted as his resident architect at All Saints' Church, Brockhampton, Herefordshire (1901–02) where Lethaby's experimentation with the employment of direct labour under a site architect instead of a contractor under a formal building contract, and deliberately produced few drawings, gave Wells freedom to evolve the design as the building rose and to engage in the physical activity of building. He worked in a similar role with E. S. Prior at Voewood (later Home Place), Kelling, near Holt, Norfolk (1903–04), where the exterior was faced with the stones quarried from its own site, and at St Andrew's Church, Roker, Sunderland (1905–07), built for a local shipbuilder, John Priestman, for which he also carved the stone font.

In parallel to collaborative projects with other architects, he developed an independent practice. His own Church of St Edward the Confessor, Kempley, Gloucestershire, (1903–04), for Lord Beauchamp, has similarities to both All Saints, Brockhampton and St Andrew's, Roker, which it pre-dates. St Edward's, described by Betjeman as "a mini-cathedral of the Arts and Crafts movement", was again built from local materials by local labour under his direction. The rood screen, carved by a man said to have been the last ship's figurehead carver in London, was painted by Wells and his brother Linley. All these churches made an early use of concrete. Following his work at Home Place, he built the new D'Oyly Carte Wing and Chapel at the nearby Kelling Sanatorium, High Kelling (1906–07). In 1910–12 he carried out repairs to the medieval St John the Baptist Church, Thaxted, Essex, removing the cement render covering the exterior, and installing The Stellar, a great star-shaped candelabra hanging in the cross aisle, which he had originally designed for St Mary's, Primrose Hill, London, but was rejected by the vicar there.

In 1905 his design for a cottage for Letchworth Garden City, Hertfordshire won a £100 prize.

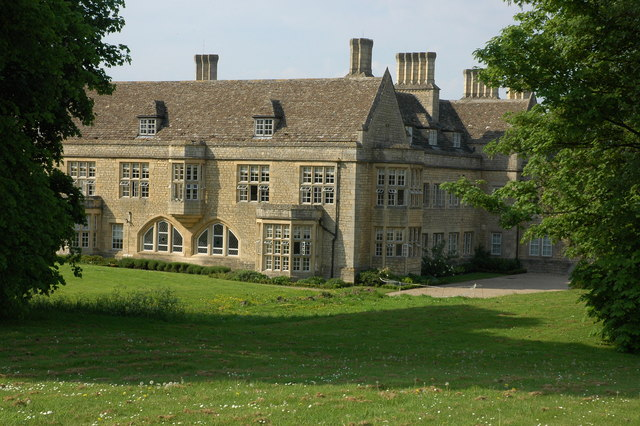
Besford Court; the large stonebuilt extension which was added in 1912

Lord Beauchamp went on to commission designs from Wells for the central hall of his house, Madresfield Court, Gloucestershire, and in 1910, when he sold the Besford Court estate in Worcestershire to Major George Noble (later 2nd baronet), Wells was engaged as the architect for its major re-construction by the new owner. This involved the demolition of a Georgian wing, the retention of the original Elizabethan core, and the addition of a large courtyard range in a Tudor gothic vein. At about the same time, Wells, together with his client Major Noble's wife Molly (née Mary Ethel Waters), set up a craft workshop at 94 Horseferry Road, London called St Veronica's, specialising in interior design, bookbinding, calligraphy and other crafts. Building work at Besford was halted in 1912 when the Nobles separated. They were divorced in 1916, and Wells and (by then) Lady Noble married in 1917. Besford Court, the last great, gothic English country house, was never occupied. It was sold, incomplete, to a school, in 1917 and in 2001 was converted into eight houses as part of a larger housing development.

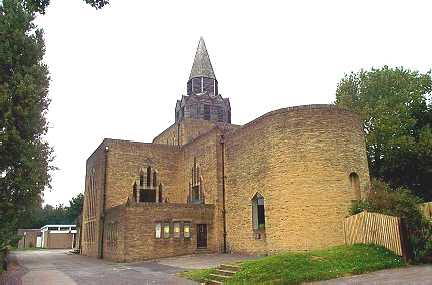
St Wilfrid's Church, Halton, Leeds (1937–39)

Wells' subsequent career was undermined both by the increasingly unaffordable ethos of the Arts and Crafts movement after 1918, but probably also because of his perceived role in the failure of the Nobles' marriage.

Mr and Mrs Wells moved to Slinfold Manor near Horsham, Sussex where, to supplement his fewer architectural commissions he designed a series of devices for the use of craftsmen including secret joinery connections and self-draining tiles, which he patented in the UK and US. In 1927 they moved to Watermist House, 52 Upper Mall, Hammersmith, from where he practised for the remainder of his career.

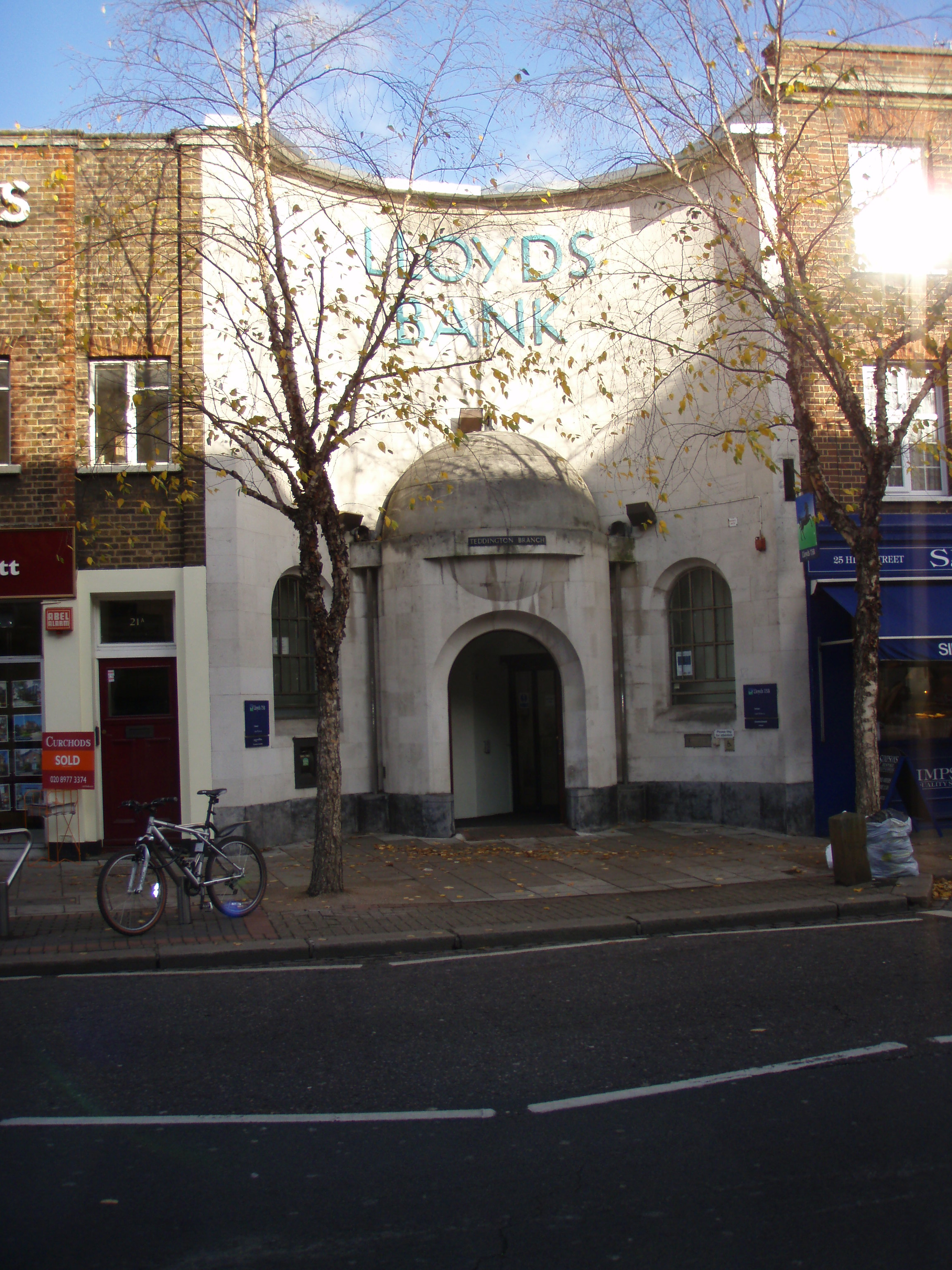
The Teddington branch of Lloyds Bank (1929)

Built work of the 1920s includes a new entrance hall at Killerton, Devon in 1924 for Sir Francis Acland and, together with his wife, who did the astonishing plasterwork, a late Arts and Crafts work at Wardington Manor for Beaumont (Montie) Pease, (later 1st Baron Wardington) from 1917. In the 1930s he designed the 'Galleon Wing' extension to Said House, Chiswick Mall for Sir Nigel Playfair incorporating a huge curved plate-glass window for the first floor Drawing Room (the location for Series One of the BBC reality programme The Apprentice) and, presumably through his step-daughter Veronica Pease's father-in-law Lord Gainford (a former cabinet colleague of Sir Francis Acland, a cousin of Beaumont Pease and the first chairman of the BBC); the Children's Hour studio and Talk Studio 3A at Broadcasting House. For competition entries and other connections of his wife including Lord Grey and Sir Evelyn Wrench, Wells submitted some very advanced designs ahead of contemporary modernism for a range of projects through the 1910s and 20s, none of which was built. Beaumont Pease, as chairman of Lloyds Bank, also commissioned Wells for the bank's branch at Teddington, Middlesex.

Towards the end of his career, Wells' St Wilfrid's Church at Halton, Leeds (1937–39), funded by his old client at Roker, John Priestman, again shows Arts and Crafts blended with an advanced modernism. Large expanses of clear glass within tall, stepped lancet windows allow light to flood high vaults and cast shadows on the plastered interior. He also furnished much of the interior.

Wells had one daughter, Crystal, known as Rosebud. She married in 1940 but was killed in a train accident a few weeks later. Wells and his wife, who was said to have lost her mind as a result of this tragedy, moved to a cottage on her daughter Lady Gainford's estate at Taynish, Argyllshire, where they died within weeks of each other in 1942.
