= St Wilfrid's Church, Halton, Leeds =

Church in Leeds, England

Coordinates: 53.7982°N 1.4746°W

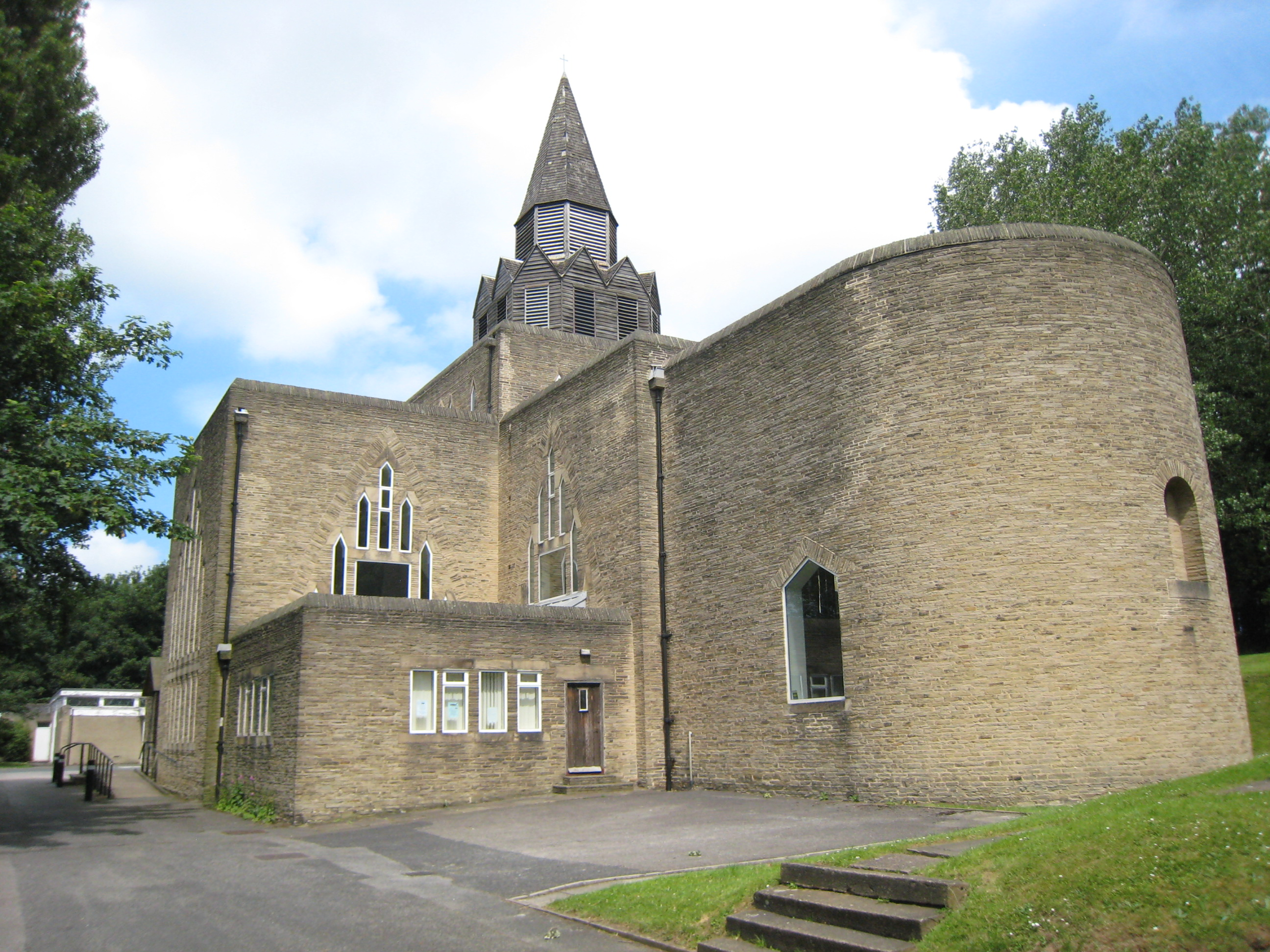
St Wilfrid's Church (2017)

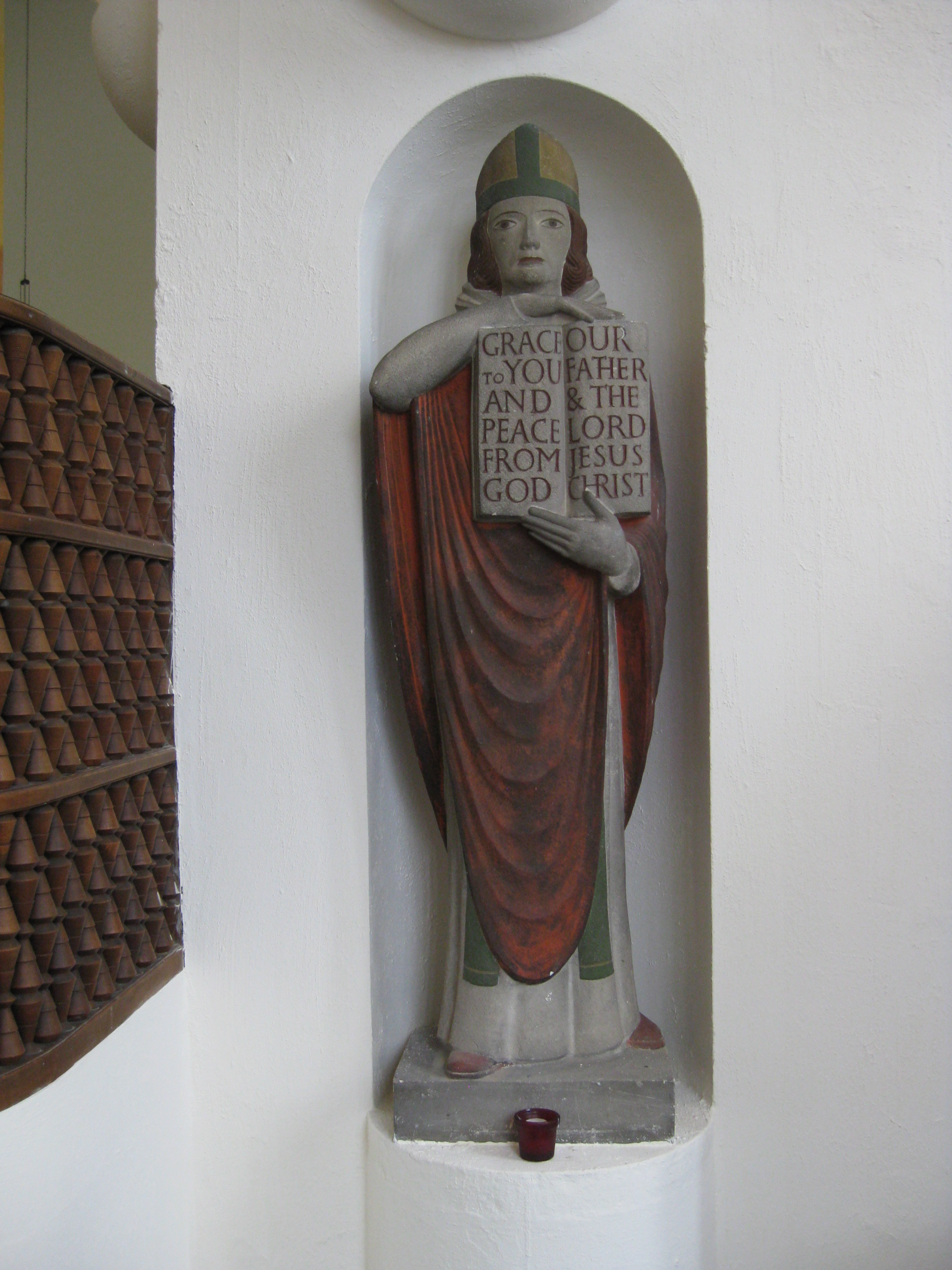
St Wilfrid by Eric Gill (1939)

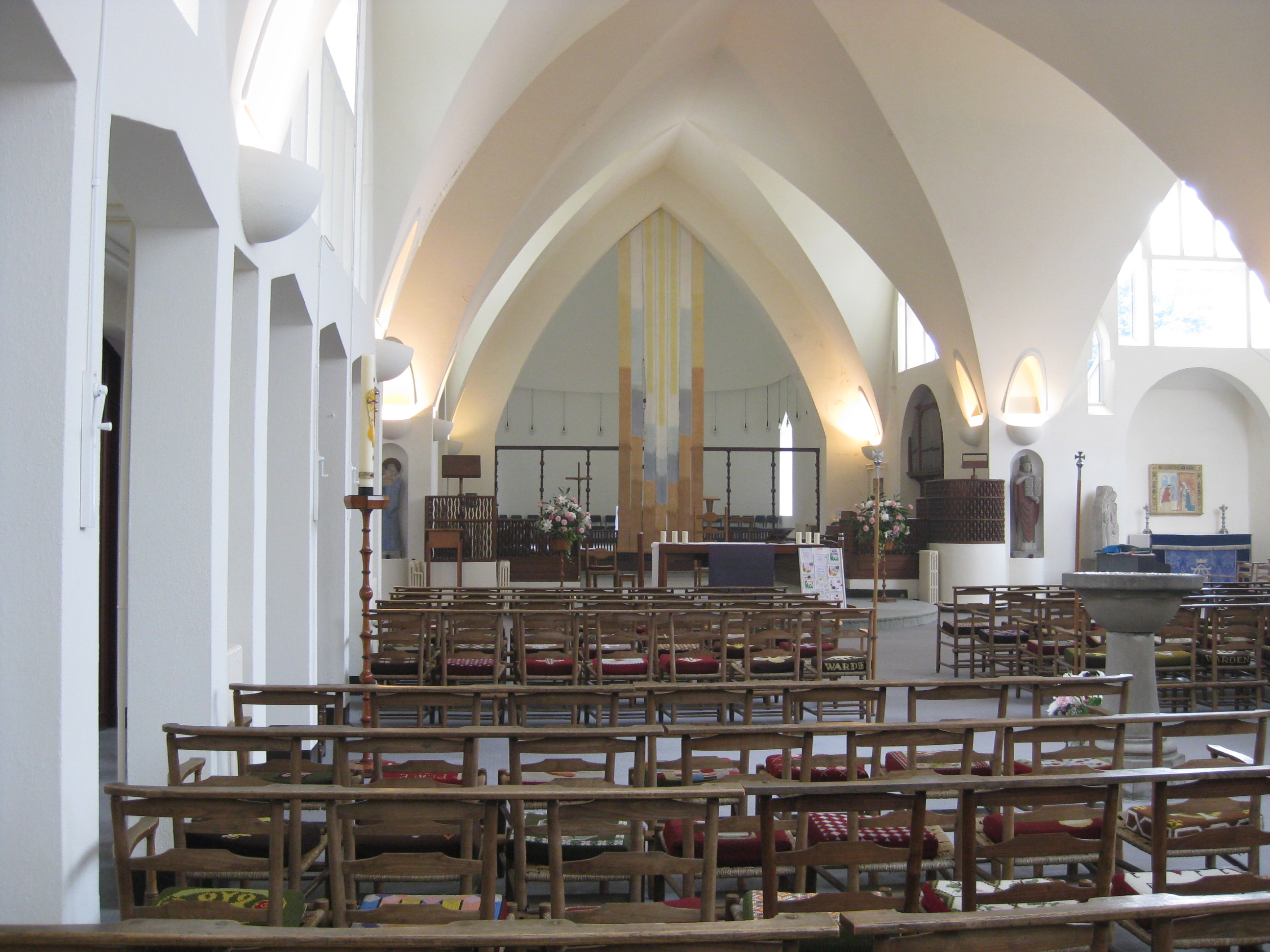
Interior (2014)

St Wilfrid's Church, Halton was designed by Albert Randall Wells and built between 1937 and 1939. It is situated in the 1930s suburb of Halton in Leeds, England.

The site on Halton Hill was given by Viscount Halifax and the building was paid for by Sir John Priestman. The foundation stone was laid on 6 November 1937. The church is Grade II* listed. It bridges the gap between the Arts and Crafts style and modernism. It has Early English gothic inspired details, such as the triangular-headed windows. The concrete vaulting within the interior in Nikolaus Pevsner's words "remind one of German Expressionism in recent church architecture rather than that of England".

The church was built at a cost of £11,700. It still has many of the original fittings designed by Wells as well as contemporary art by Eric Gill. Congregational seating was made by Edward Gardiner who, earlier, had a partnership with Ernest Gimson.

== See also ==
- Grade II* listed buildings in West Yorkshire
- Listed buildings in Leeds (Temple Newsam Ward)
