= Fearnville =

Area of Leeds, England

Coordinates: 53.81659°N 1.48702°W

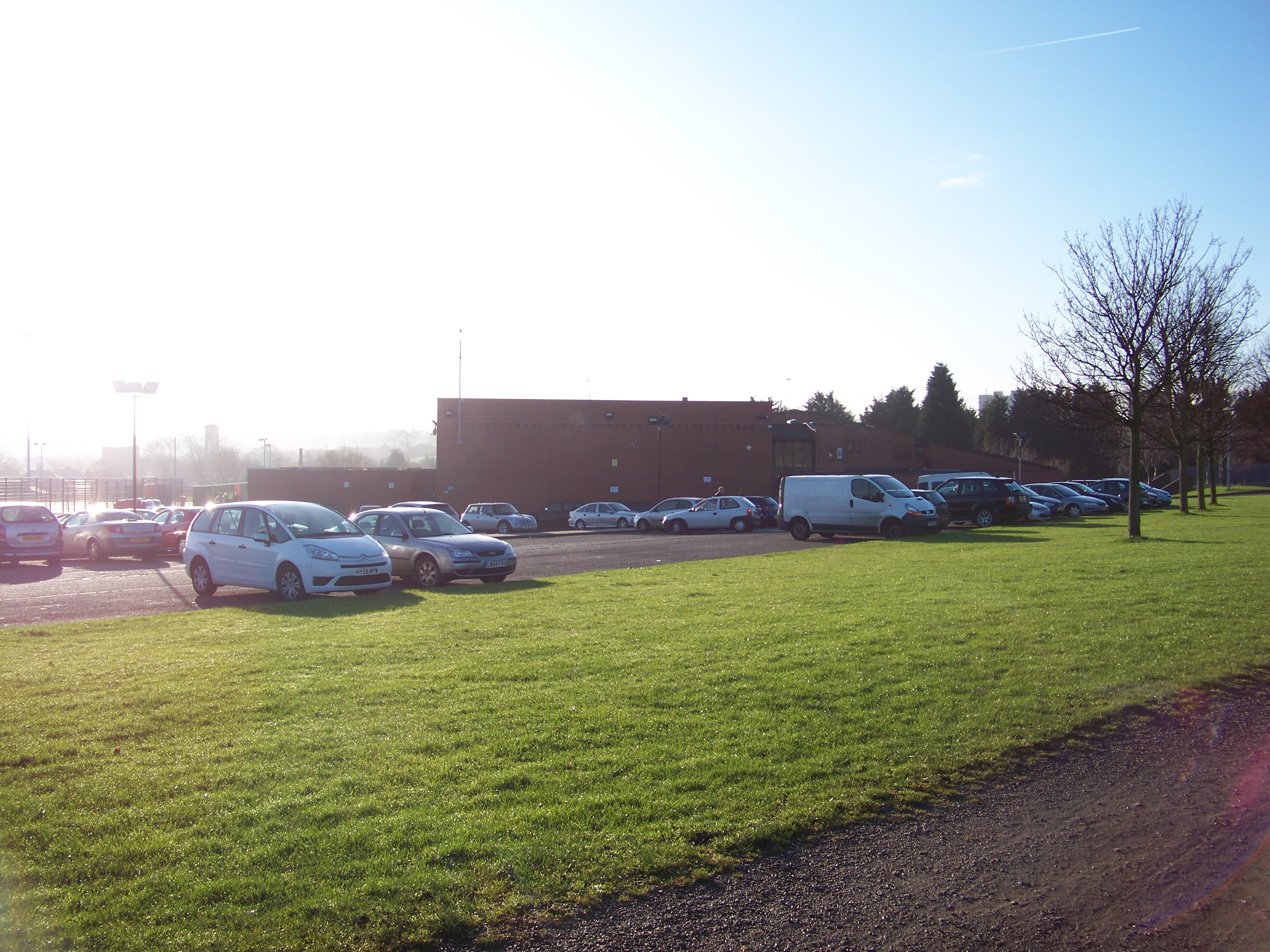
- Fearnville Leisure Centre

- Location within West Yorkshire
- OS grid reference: SE331373
- Metropolitan borough: City of Leeds
- Metropolitan county: West Yorkshire
- Region: Yorkshire and the Humber
- Country: England
- Sovereign state: United Kingdom
- Post town: LEEDS
- Postcode district: LS8, LS14
- Dialling code: 0113
- Police: West Yorkshire
- Fire: West Yorkshire
- Ambulance: Yorkshire
- UK Parliament: Leeds East

Fearnville is a small area of Leeds which has boundaries with Roundhay, Seacroft, Oakwood, Gipton and Harehills. Fearnville is commonly described as being part of Roundhay or Oakwood, although it is classed as being in the Killingbeck and Seacroft ward. Fearnville had a population of 3,654 in 2011.

== Fearnville Leisure Centre ==
Fearnville Leisure Centre, off of Oakwood Lane, is a fitness/leisure centre commonly used by residents from Fearnville and the surrounding areas. It offers a variety of facilities, such as swimming, gym and football. There is a crown green bowling club on the grounds.

=== Gipton Gala ===
The Fearnville Leisure Centre playing fields are the location of the annual Gipton Gala. The Gipton Gala is a local festival, similar to the Leeds West Indian Carnival, but on a more minor scale. Usually, a procession starts at Gipton fire station on the morning of the gala, and makes its way to Fearnville Leisure Centre. There have been fears in the past for the future of the carnival when there were talks in 2009 of closing Fearnville Leisure Centre, which would mean the location of the gala being lost. However, in 2010, there was serious concern for that year's gala, because of a group of travellers who set up a group of caravans on the fields a few weeks before the gala was set to happen. This is the first time, since the gala was reintroduced to locals, that there has been talk of cancelling the gala. However, they were moved off of the fields used for the gala by West Yorkshire Police on Monday 6 July 2010.

== Fearnville Hall ==
Fearnville Hall (sometimes referred to as Fearnville House) is a small country house, located off Dib Lane, behind a row of houses on Dib Lane and the adjacent Fearnville Crescent. Fearnville Hall is a Grade II listed building, built in the early 19th century. The building is a two-storey house, made with grit stone and ashlar with a slate roof.

Leeds Civic Trust has observed that the hall is currently in a very poor state of repair. The grounds of the house are open through the driveway off of Dib Lane, apart from part of a tree trunk placed in the driveway to try to deter fly tippers from using the ground. The grounds being open has meant that there has been much vandalism caused to the building, which has resulted in many of the windows and doors being covered with metal sheets.

== Amenities ==
Dib Lane is the main shopping parade in Fearnville. This shopping parade is split into two parts by houses and a pub, The Grange. The Grange pub is built on the site of an old manor house, and was named after the manor house, which sometimes causes people to confuse Fearnville Hall with The Grange. Dib Lane consists of many shops and takeaways, as well as a veterinary surgery, pharmacy and hair dressers. There is also a small shopping parade opposite Fearnville Leisure Centre which mainly consists of takeaways. On the boundary of Fearnville and Oakwood/Roundhay, there is a Co-op supermarket and small shopping parade as well as a McDonald's.

== See also ==
- Listed buildings in Seacroft and Killingbeck
