= LS postcode area =

Postcode area within the United Kingdom

Leeds
- Postcode area
- Coordinates: 53.823°N 1.554°W
- Country: United Kingdom
- Postcode area: LS
- Postcode area name: Leeds
- Post towns: 6
- Postcode districts: 32
- Postcode sectors: 150
- Postcodes (live): 21,561
- Postcodes (total): 31,805
- Statistics as at May 2020

The LS postcode area, also known as the Leeds postcode area, is a group of 29 postcode districts in England, within six post towns. These cover northern West Yorkshire (including Leeds, Wetherby, Pudsey, Otley, Morley and Ilkley) and some parts of North Yorkshire (including Tadcaster).

Mail for the LS postcode area is processed at Leeds Mail Centre, along with mail for the BD, HD, HG, HX, WF and YO postcode areas.

== Coverage ==
The approximate coverage of the postcode districts:

Postcode district	Post town	Coverage	Local authority area(s)
LS1	LEEDS	Leeds city centre	Leeds
LS2	LEEDS	Leeds city centre, Woodhouse	Leeds
LS3	LEEDS	Burley, Woodhouse	Leeds
LS4	LEEDS	Burley, Kirkstall	Leeds
LS5	LEEDS	Hawksworth, Kirkstall	Leeds
LS6	LEEDS	Beckett Park, Burley, Headingley, Hyde Park, Meanwood, Woodhouse	Leeds
LS7	LEEDS	Beck Hill, Buslingthorpe, Chapel Allerton, Chapeltown, Little London, Lovell Park, Meanwood, Miles Hill, Potternewton, Scott Hall, Sheepscar	Leeds
LS8	LEEDS	Fearnville, Gipton, Gledhow, Harehills, Moortown, Oakwood, Roundhay	Leeds
LS9	LEEDS	Burmantofts, Cross Green, East End Park, Gipton, Harehills, Mabgate, Osmondthorpe, Steander, Richmond Hill, Halton Moor	Leeds
LS10	LEEDS	Belle Isle, Hunslet, Leeds city centre, Middleton, Stourton	Leeds
LS11	LEEDS	Leeds city centre, Beeston, Beeston Hill, Cottingley, Holbeck	Leeds
LS12	LEEDS	Armley, Farnley, New Farnley, Wortley	Leeds
LS13	LEEDS	Bramley, Gamble Hill, Moorside, Rodley, Swinnow	Leeds
LS14	LEEDS	Fearnville, Killingbeck, Seacroft, Scarcroft, Swarcliffe, Thorner, Whinmoor	Leeds
LS15	LEEDS	Austhorpe, Barwick-in-Elmet, Colton, Cross Gates, Halton, Halton Moor, Manston, Pendas Fields, Scholes, Temple Newsam, Whitkirk, Killingbeck, Swarcliffe	Leeds
LS16	LEEDS	Adel, Bramhope, Cookridge, Eccup, Far Headingley, Holt Park, Ireland Wood, Lawnswood, Moor Grange, Tinshill, Weetwood, West Park	Leeds
LS17	LEEDS	Alwoodley, Bardsey, East Keswick, Eccup, Harewood, Moortown, Shadwell, Slaid Hill, Weardley, Wike	Leeds, North Yorkshire
LS18	LEEDS	Horsforth	Leeds
LS19	LEEDS	Carlton, Rawdon, Yeadon	Leeds
LS20	LEEDS	Guiseley, Hawksworth	Leeds
LS21	OTLEY	Arthington, Otley, Pool, Blubberhouses	Leeds, North Yorkshire
LS22	WETHERBY	Collingham, Linton, Wetherby	Leeds
LS23	WETHERBY	Boston Spa, Bramham, Clifford, Thorp Arch, Walton	Leeds
LS24	TADCASTER	Saxton, Stutton, Ulleskelf, Church Fenton, Oxton, Tadcaster, Toulston, Wighill, Ryther cum Ossendyke	North Yorkshire
LS25	LEEDS	Aberford, Garforth, Hillam, Kippax, Ledsham, Micklefield, Monk Fryston, Sherburn-in-Elmet, South Milford	Leeds, North Yorkshire
LS26	LEEDS	Great Preston, Methley, Mickletown, Oulton, Rothwell, Swillington, Woodlesford	Leeds
LS27	LEEDS	Churwell, Gildersome, Morley	Leeds
LS28	PUDSEY	Bagley, Calverley, Farsley, Fulneck, Pudsey, Stanningley	Leeds
LS29	ILKLEY	Addingham, Ben Rhydding, Burley in Wharfedale, Burley Woodhead, Denton, Ilkley, Menston, Middleton	Bradford, Leeds, North Yorkshire
LS88	LEEDS	Jobcentre Plus	Non-geographic
LS98	LEEDS	First Direct	Non-geographic
LS99	LEEDS	PO Boxes	Non-geographic

== Map ==
LS postcode area map, showing postcode districts in red and post towns in grey text, with links to nearby BD, DN, HG, WF and YO postcode areas.

Detailed map of postcode districts in central Leeds

== See also ==
- Postcode Address File
- List of postcode areas in the United Kingdom
