= Oakwood, Leeds =

Suburb of Leeds, West Yorkshire, England

Coordinates: 53.827°N 1.505°W

Oakwood
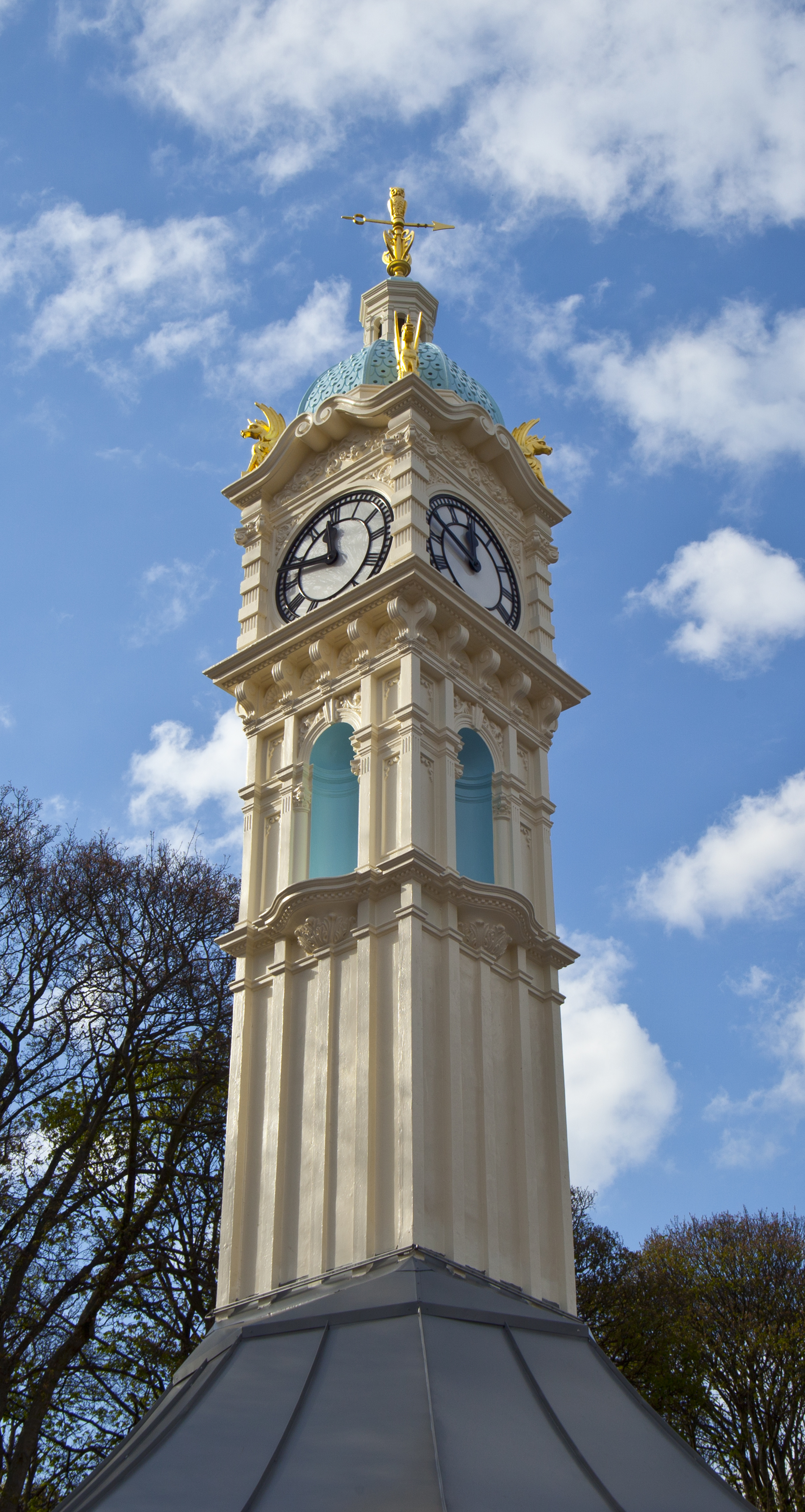
- The Oakwood Clock tower following restoration. 2015.

- Location within West Yorkshire
- Metropolitan borough: City of Leeds
- Metropolitan county: West Yorkshire
- Region: Yorkshire and the Humber
- Country: England
- Sovereign state: United Kingdom
- Post town: LEEDS
- Postcode district: LS8
- Dialling code: 0113
- Police: West Yorkshire
- Fire: West Yorkshire
- Ambulance: Yorkshire
- UK Parliament: Leeds North East

Oakwood is a suburb of north-east Leeds, West Yorkshire, England, that lies between Gipton and Roundhay Park.

The suburb lies within the LS8 postcode and sits within both the Roundhay ward of Leeds City Council and Leeds North East parliamentary constituency.

== Etymology ==
The name itself has fairly simple roots, merely referring to the species of tree, though the usage of the name for the suburb can be attributed to Oakwood House, a stately home that has since been renovated and turned into a retirement home called Sabourn Court.

== History ==
=== Roundhay Estate and Oakwood House ===
What is now Oakwood was originally a small rural area part of the greater Roundhay estate on the fringes of Roundhay Park and was owned by George Goodman. Oakwood was part of the Leeds Rural District, a district containing the then growing estates of Roundhay and Seacroft, and was heavily tied to the city of Leeds. The land was sold by Goodman in 1825 to a local wealthy wool merchant family. Soon after the land purchase, Oakwood House had begun construction under the name of Wood End. It is not known exactly when the house started construction but maps show between 1825 and 1847. The house would change hands multiple times between 1847 and 1865 when it was sold to the Hudson family, who dropped the Wood End name and settled on Oakwood House. By 1867 the house would stop being advertised and surveyed as part of Roundhay as the name Oakwood had also begun to be used for the land surrounding the house. In 1891 much of the land was put up for sale as the Oakwood Building Estate and would form the basis for Oakwood as a settlement.

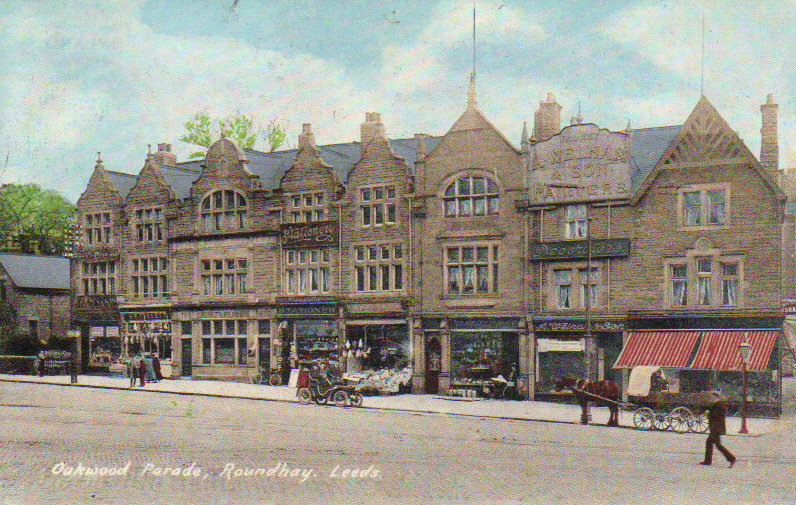
Oakwood Parade in 1909

=== Development and Growth ===
The Oakwood Building Estate had led to the creation of Oakwood Parade, a series of terraced buildings extending down modern day Roundhay Road with the first four buildings being completed in 1894. The full parade would not be completed until the 1920s. The oldest continuously occupied shop on the Parade is the Fish Bar, a Grade II Listed Building with an Art Deco frontage of black glass panels, which has been selling fish and chips since 1934.

Possibly the most recognisable feature of Oakwood is its clock tower. Oakwood Clock, is a small clock tower that was built in 1904 by Potts of Leeds to the design of Leeming and Leeming and is sited at the bottom end of Roundhay Park; it was first designed as the centrepiece of Kirkgate Market, Leeds. After the design of Kirkgate Market was revised it was considered that this clock would no longer be suitable for the building, and the idea to place it in Oakwood came about. Eight years after it was first built this clock was erected in Oakwood. In early 2015, the tower was replaced, with the original clock being kept.

== Roundhay Garden Scene ==
Although credited as having taken place in Roundhay, It was in the garden of Oakwood Grange that Louis Le Prince filmed the Roundhay Garden Scene in 1888, credited as the first motion picture. Oakwood Grange was demolished in 1972 to make way for Oakwood Grange housing estate but the adjacent stately home, Oakwood Hall, still remains as a nursing home.

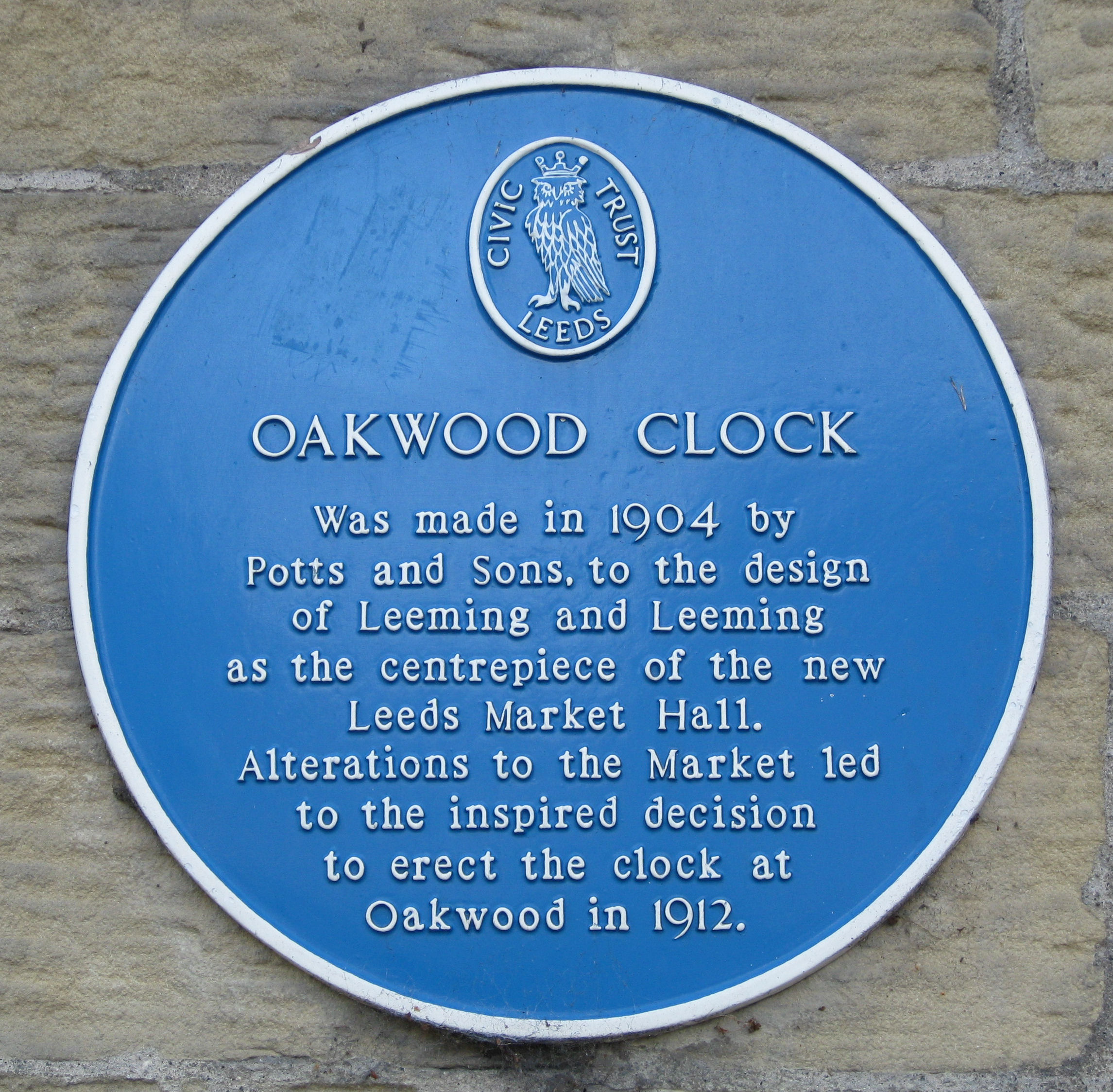
Plaque for the Oakwood Clock

== Amenities ==
On Roundhay Road is the Post Office, a supermarket, currently Home Bargains (formerly Netto, Co-op, Somerfield and Safeway) and several shops and banks. Further down from the Oakwood Boundary is Tesco. Oakwood Library sits on the corner of the junction diagonally opposite the Oakwood clock.

=== Oakwood Farmers' Market ===
Held on the third Saturday of the month since 15 March 2008 around the Oakwood Clock, Oakwood Farmers' Market has become a regular feature. Organised by local residents in conjunction with Roundhay Environmental Action Project the Oakwood Farmers' Market's goal is to provide quality local produce, some of which is organic, with local being defined at produce travelling no more than 20 mi to the market. Receiving FARMA accreditation, being the second farmers' market in Leeds to have done so, has meant that the Oakwood Farmers' Market can display the FARMA logo to prove its status as a true farmers' market. Regular stalls and 'feature' stalls provide a range of local products including: jams, meats, eggs, chocolates, bread and wide range of locally grown fruits and vegetables. Seasonal holidays are celebrated with local musicians, artists and performers.

== Associated areas and boundaries ==
While the A58 Easterly Road is often used to denote the border between Oakwood and Gipton, as seen with the city council wards and the constituencies, Oakwood does not officially have any boundaries. Because the LS8 postcode boundary includes Fearnville, Gipton and Harehills, they are sometimes considered part of or heavily linked with Oakwood. A major example of this is Oakwood Primary School, which bears the name yet sits firmly within Gipton.

Despite being two separate areas, Roundhay is the name of the council ward and as such some areas within Oakwood, such as the Post Office and Tesco, refer to themselves as part of Roundhay rather than Oakwood.

== Gipton Wood ==
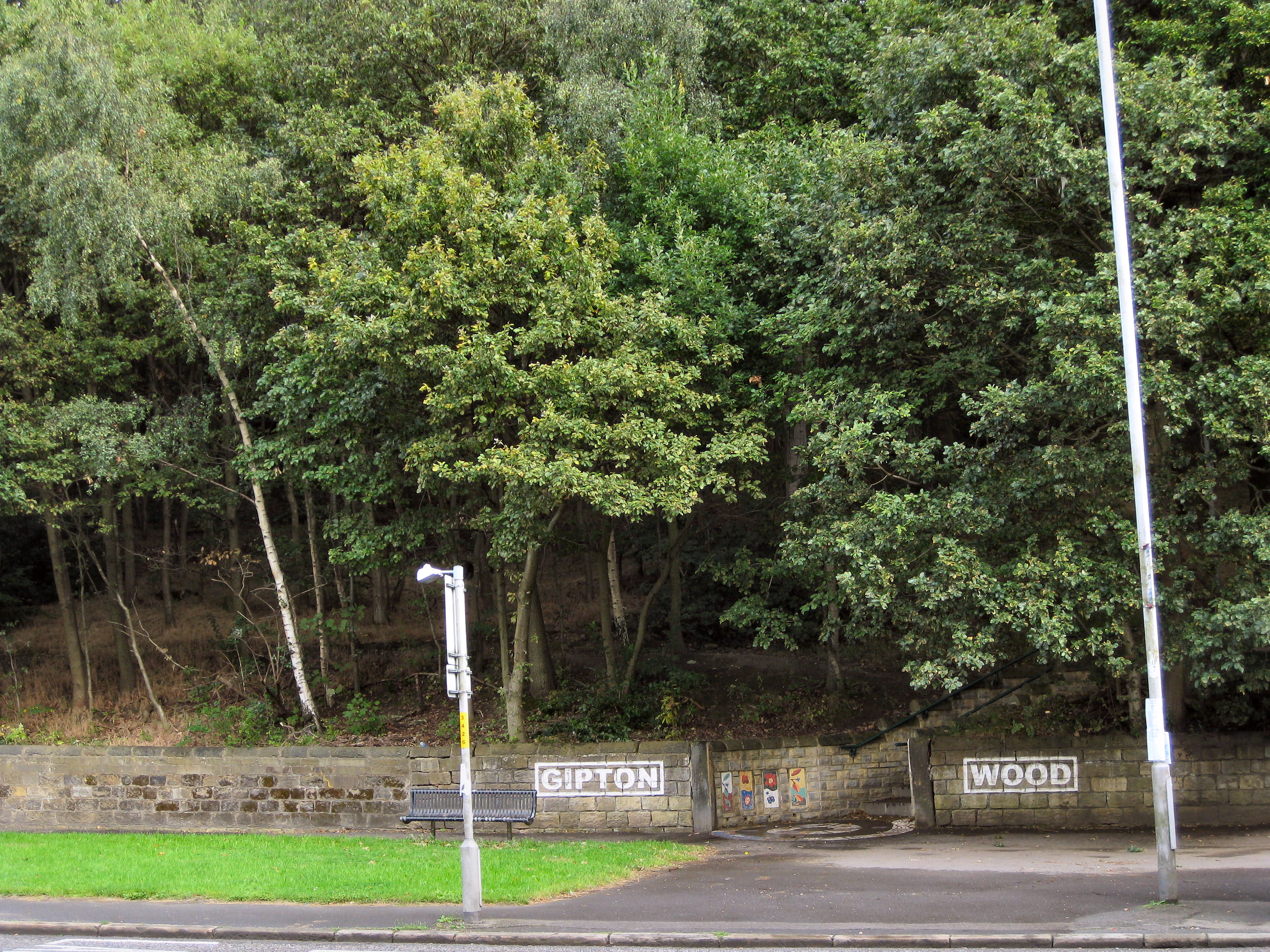
Gipton Wood from Roundhay Road

Gipton Wood refers to either an area of woodland or an area of housing adjacent to the wood in Leeds. The woodland is now triangular, bounded by the Oakwood Boundary Road on the north-east, Roundhay Road on the west and Copgrove Road on the south-east. It is 8.2 hectares (20 acres) in area and part of the Forest of Leeds. It is an ancient woodland, previously housing a Stone Age, Bronze Age, and Roman settlement. Trees are predominantly oak, sycamore, beech and hornbeam. It was given to the city in 1923 and is now maintained by the City of Leeds and a voluntary group, the Friends of Gipton Wood. The public house on the opposite side of the road was formerly called "The Gipton", but its name has now been changed to "The Roundhay".

The residential area known as Gipton Wood is south of the wood down to Easterly Road.

== Gallery ==
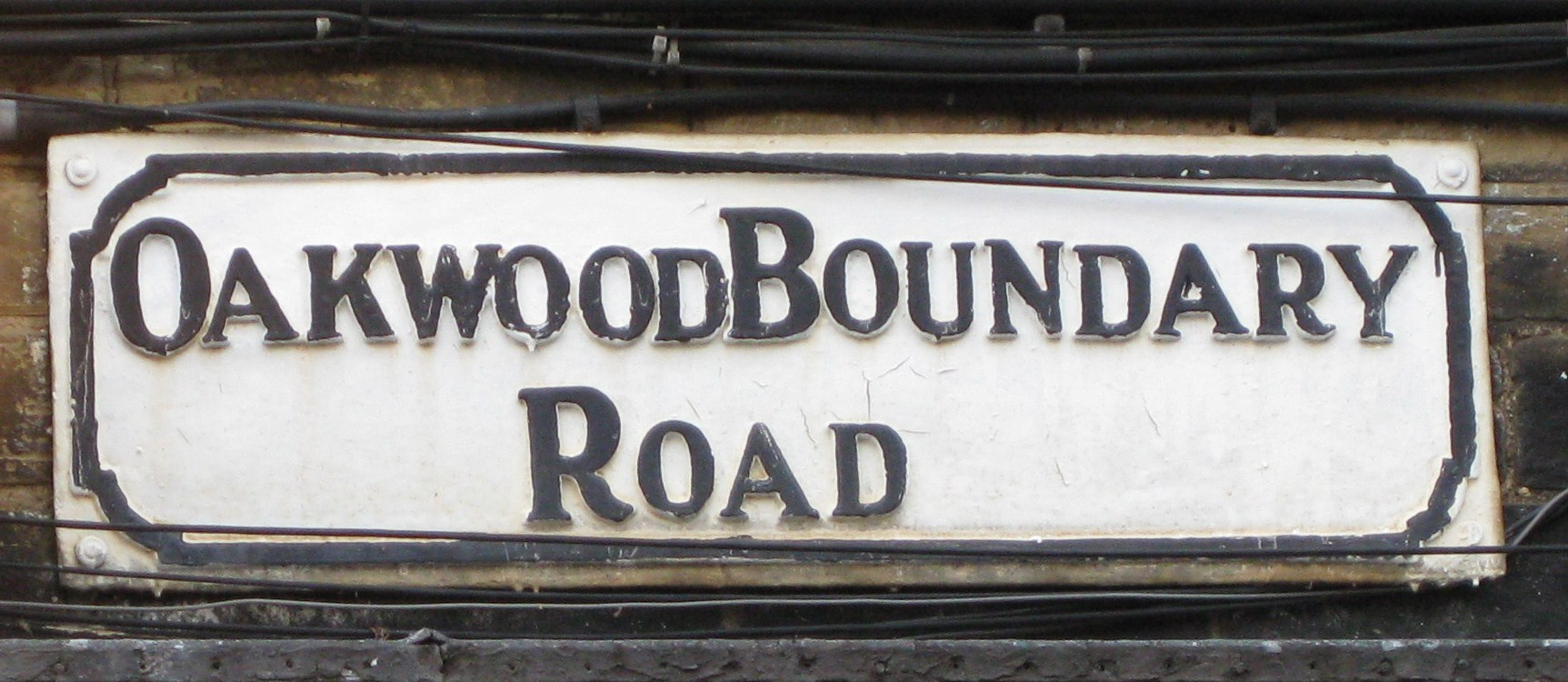
Oakwood Boundary Road on the north-east side of Gipton Wood

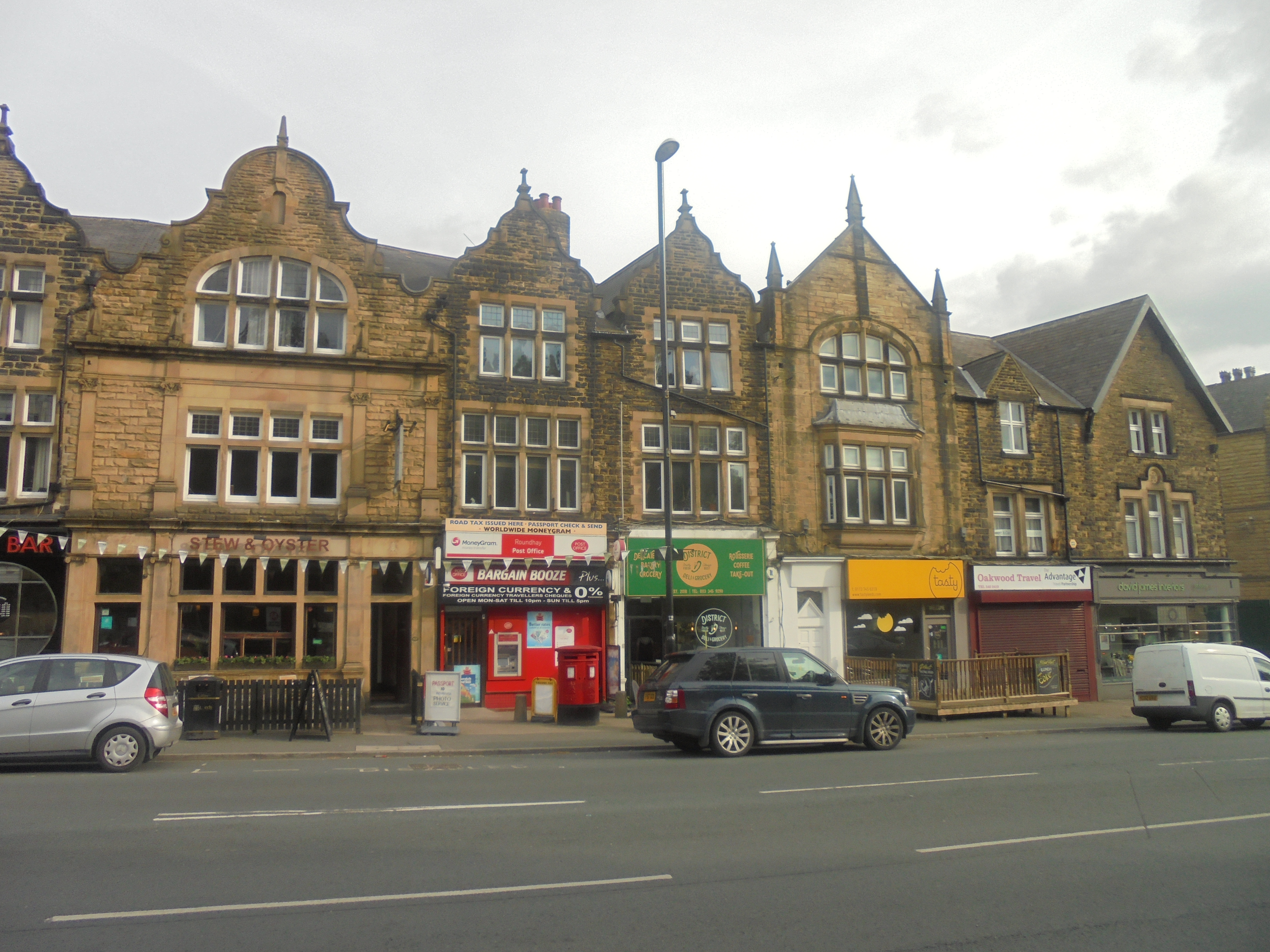
Shops on Roundhay Road

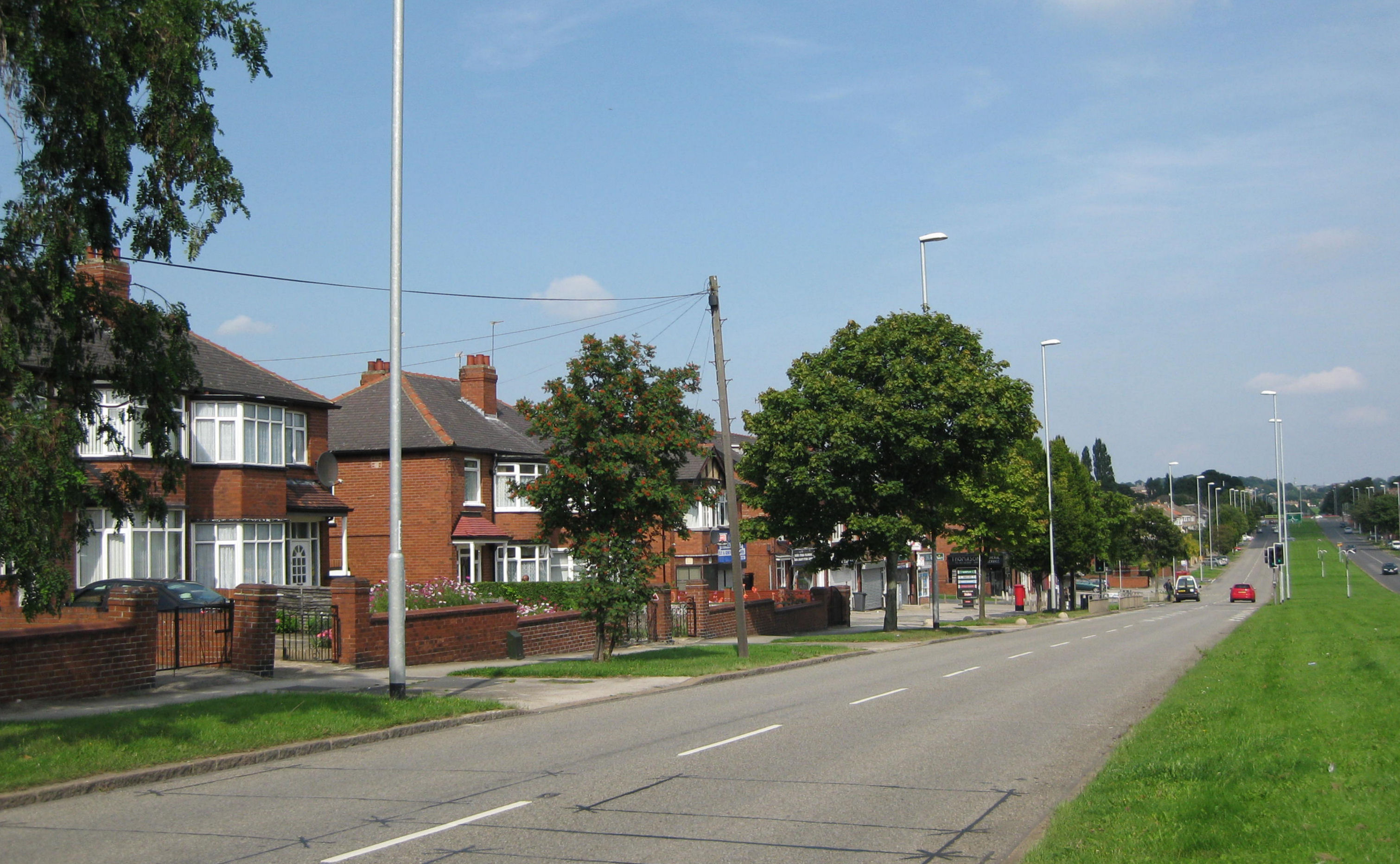
The A58 Easterly Road, dividing Oakwood and Gipton

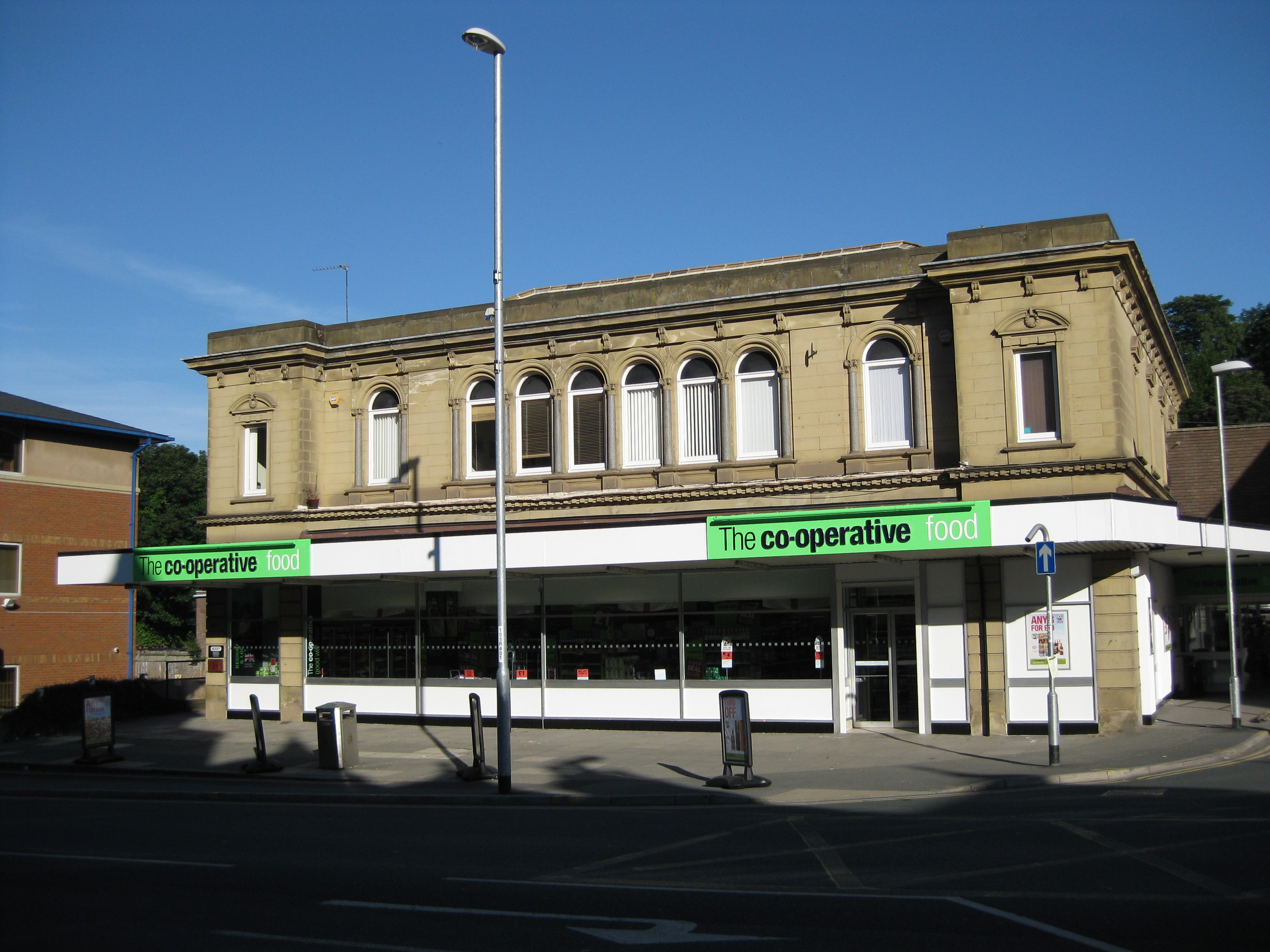
Co-op Roundhay Road

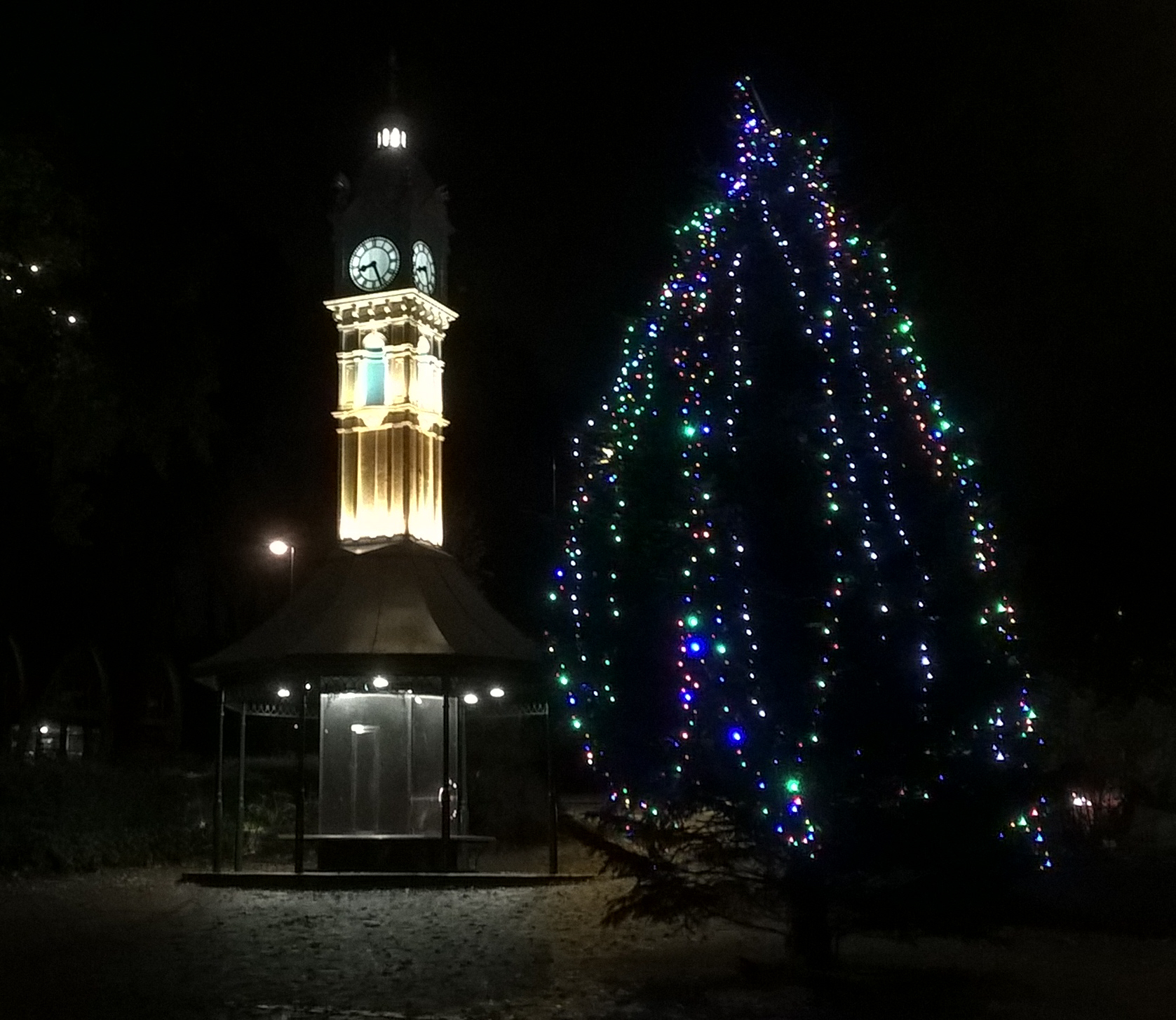
Oakwood Clock at night with Christmas Tree

== See also ==
- Listed buildings in Leeds (Roundhay Ward)
