= Listed buildings in Seacroft and Killingbeck =

Killingbeck and Seacroft is a ward in the metropolitan borough of the City of Leeds, West Yorkshire, England. It contains nine listed buildings that are recorded in the National Heritage List for England. All the listed buildings are designated at Grade II, the lowest of the three grades, which is applied to "buildings of national importance and special interest". The ward contains the former village of Seacroft to the northeast of the centre of Leeds, and later developments westward towards the city centre, which include Killingbeck and Fearnville. The listed buildings consist of houses and associated structures, a church, a public house, a former public house later a guest house, and a former water tower.

== Buildings ==
Name and location	Photograph	Date	Notes
1049 and 1051 York Road; 53.81720°N 1.45804°W		Mid 18th century	A house, later divided, it is in painted brick with a slate roof. There are two storeys, three bays, and a single-storey lean-to at the rear. The windows are a mix of casements and sashes.
Fearnville; 53.82000°N 1.48889°W	—	Early 19th century	A small country house, later divided, it is in gritstone with a sill band, a cornice and blocking course, and a hipped slate roof. There are two storeys, three bays, a rear stair wing and a service range. In the centre is a porch with Doric columns, an entablature, a triglyph frieze, a dentilled cornice, and a shallow pediment. The windows are sashes, with panels above the ground floor windows. In the left return is a staircase window.
The Old Lamb Guesthouse; 53.81495°N 1.45604°W		Early 19th century	A public house, later a guest house, it is in gritstone with a hipped slate roof. There are two storeys, cellars and an attic, three bays, and a single-storey rear outshut. In the centre is a round-arched doorway with a semicircular fanlight. The windows are sashes, and in the attic is a 20th-century three-light dormer. At the rear, steps and a barrel ramp lead down to the former beer cellar.
The Grange; 53.82021°N 1.45901°W		1837	A stone house that has a stone slate roof with coped gables, and is in Tudor style. There are two storeys, a front of four bays, two bays on the sides, and a rear service wing. On the southeast front, the fourth bay projects and is gabled, and in the second bay is a two-storey gabled porch. The porch contains a doorway with a hood mould with a carved shield above. The windows are mullioned or mullioned and transomed. On the southwest front are two Dutch gables, and a canted embattled bay window.
Coach house and service range, The Grange; 53.82026°N 1.45915°W		c. 1837	The building is in gritstone and has a stone slate roof with coped gables and bulbous kneelers. It consists of a two-storey two-bay block, with a projecting wing, and a single-storey two-bay coach house. The coach house contain four-centred arches with voussoirs, and small square chamfered windows.
St James' Church; 53.81859°N 1.45929°W		1844–45	The church is in stone with a stone tile roof, and is in Gothic Revival style. It consists of a nave, a north aisle, a south porch, a north transept, a chancel, a south vestry with an attached octagonal room, and a north steeple. The steeple has a three-stage tower, a stair turret with an octagonal roof, a clock face on the north side, and a broach spire. The windows are lancets, tripartite at the east end.
Cricketer's Arms Public House; 53.81989°N 1.46029°W		Mid 19th century	The public house has been extended by the incorporation and rebuilding of a terrace of cottages on the left. It is in gritstone with paired eaves brackets, and a slate roof with coped gables and kneelers. The main block has two storeys and attics, a double-depth plan, and three bays, and the left wing is lower with two storeys and four bays. In the centre of the main block is a round-arched doorway with a fanlight, and the windows are sashes.
Tower, Seacroft Hospital; 53.80669°N 1.46987°W		1902–04	A former water tower, it is in red brick, with a square plan, and tapering. At the top is a wide cornice, and a parapet ramped up at the corners. Below is a moulded cornice arching over the clock faces, under this is a continuous balcony with iron railings, and segmental-headed windows.
Telephone kiosk, Seacroft Hospital; 53.80657°N 1.47094°W		1965	The telephone kiosk stands adjacent to the hospital's Transport Department building. It is of the K8 type. The kiosk is in cast iron with an aluminium door on a concrete base. Three sides contain sheets of toughened glass, above on all sides are rectangular signage plates, and the roof is domed.
