= Gipton =

Suburb of Leeds, England

Coordinates: 53.8093°N 1.4940°W

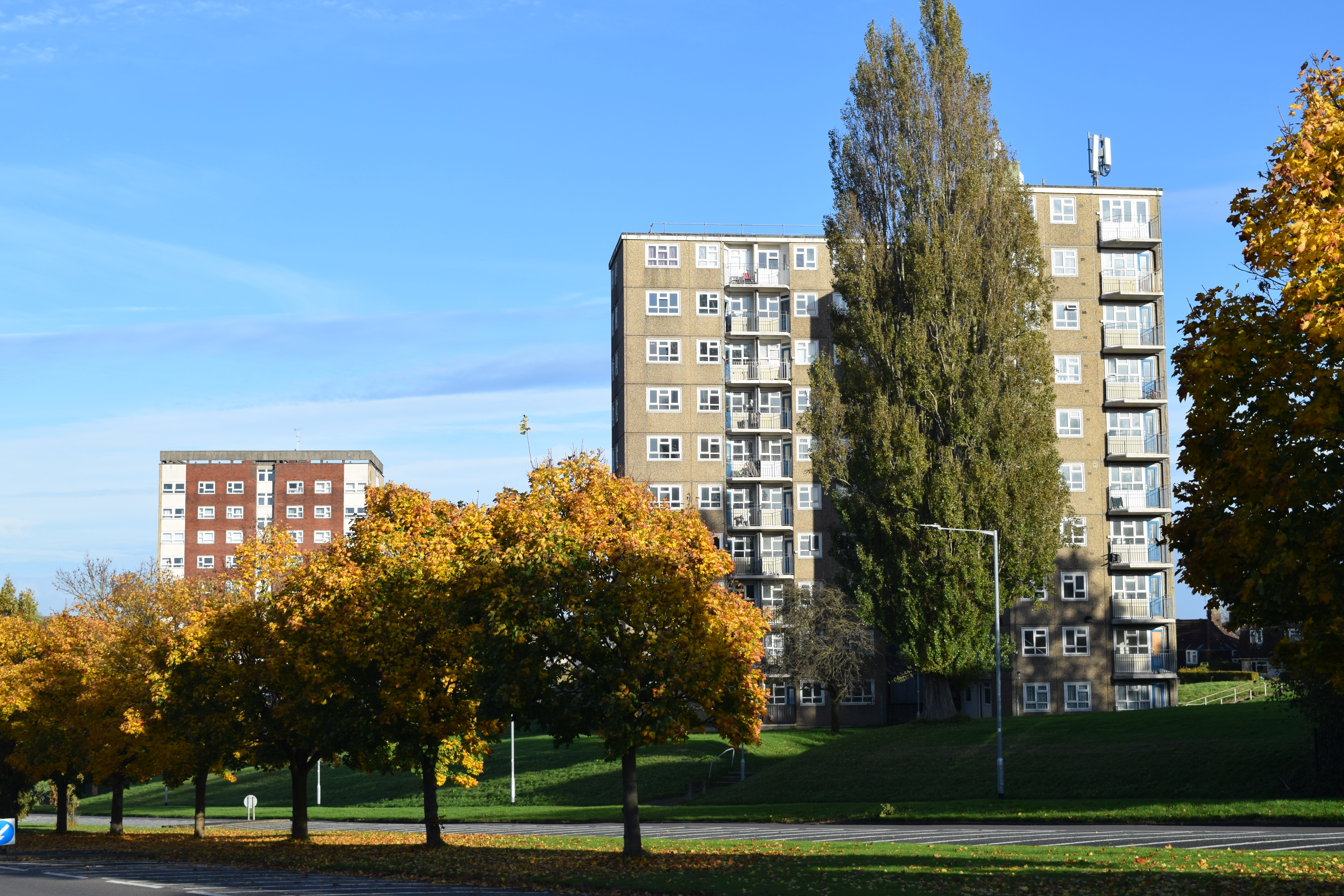
- Oak Tree Drive

- Location within West Yorkshire
- OS grid reference: SE334348
- Metropolitan borough: City of Leeds
- Metropolitan county: West Yorkshire
- Region: Yorkshire and the Humber
- Country: England
- Sovereign state: United Kingdom
- Post town: LEEDS
- Postcode district: LS8/9
- Dialling code: 0113
- Police: West Yorkshire
- Fire: West Yorkshire
- Ambulance: Yorkshire
- UK Parliament: Leeds East

Gipton is a suburb of east Leeds, West Yorkshire, England, between the A58 to the north and the A64 to the south.

It is in the Gipton and Harehills ward of Leeds City Council and the Leeds East parliamentary constituency. The separate area and woodland of Gipton Wood is in Oakwood, north of Harehills and part of the Roundhay ward. Gipton’s residents are known as Giptonites.

== Etymology ==
The name of Gipton comes from Old English, and is first attested in the Domesday Book of 1086 in the forms Chipetun, Cipetun and Chiperton. The first element is a personal name, Gippe, and the second is the word tūn ('village, estate, farm'). Thus the name once meant 'Gippe's estate'.

The name Coldcotes appears in many street names in the area and derives from the ancient Anglo-Saxon settlement of the same name that was likely destroyed in the Harrying of the North.

== History ==
The 1817 village was west of the place now called Gipton and contained the Gipton Spa, a bathhouse in what is now Gledhow Valley Woods.

=== Gipton Pit ===
The area of east Leeds from Burmantofts and Harehills to Killingbeck, Seacroft, Manston and Crossgates has a history of mining for coal, ironstone and fireclay, with a large number of pits. Gipton Pit and the railway serving it opened around 1891/92. It was owned by the Low Moor Coal and Iron Company of Bradford who held extensive mineral leases in the Harehills area. The original lease was for 40 years and covered the extraction of coal and ironstone under land at Potter Newton and Coldcotes. In 1896, the lease was renewed for another 40 years. The pit was sunk in wooded farmland between Harehills Lane and Oakwood Lane. The Low Moor Colliery Railway that linked Gipton Pit with the coal staithes on Harehills Lane can be traced for much of its original length. At the eastern end of the railway, the pit head buildings, with winding gear, two shafts and railway sidings were just north of where Thorn Mount and Thorn Walk meet. The pit was taken over by the Harehills Colliery Company in circa 1898 and closed in 1921. Much of the spoil heaps have been removed. The only remaining heap has recently been levelled and a new housing estate built.

=== Gipton Estate ===
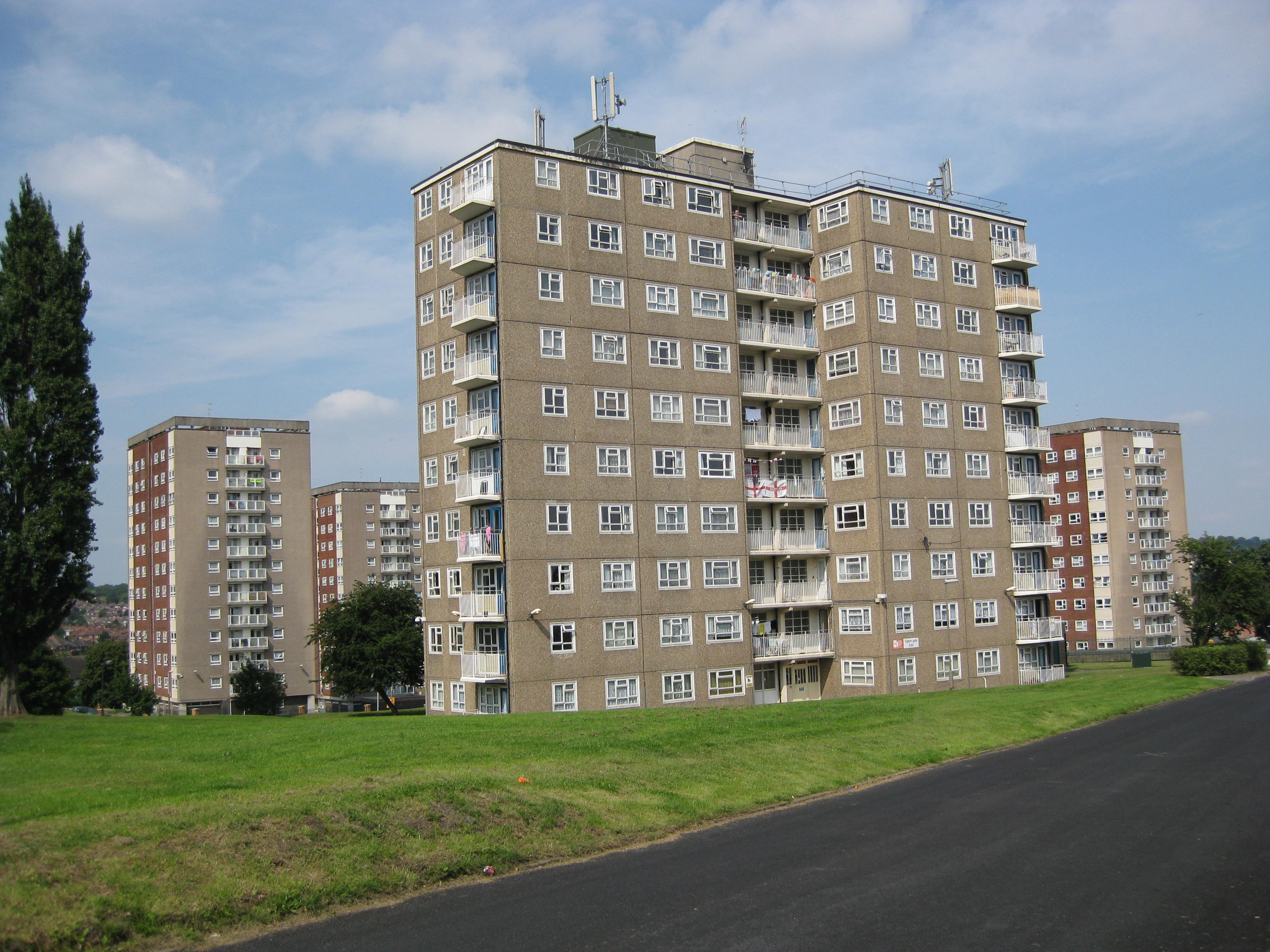
Gipton Gate East

The creation of the Gipton housing estate can be traced to the work of Charles Jenkinson, the vicar of Holbeck, a poor city-centre parish. Jenkinson was familiar with the poor housing conditions of his parishioners and was determined to alleviate them. His chance came in 1933 after the Labour Party won the municipal elections and set up a Housing Committee to oversee his programme and appointed him chair. Work began on the Gipton estate in April 1934 and involved the construction of a "garden suburb" for the working classes with 2,750 houses with accommodation for around 13,000 people. The project took two years including two roads, one 150 feet wide and the other 125 feet wide with tram tracks in the centre and grass verges at the side. The tracks linked the estate to the city centre. A shopping centre with 40 shops was at the heart of the estate and secondary shopping centres were built at other points. Sites were reserved for churches, schools, playing fields, medical practitioners, dentists, and other public facilities. The scheme would cost £12 million. When complete the estate took on a character which, while not specific to the final plan, remains fundamentally unchanged today.

=== Redevelopment ===
In the 2000s houses in some areas were demolished and replaced by a mixture of private and public housing. These included parts of the north of the estate around Amberton Road, Amberton Terrace and Amberton Close as well as parts of the south of the estate around Brander Road and Greenview Mount. The streets to the south of the estate to be demolished had suffered from vacation, neglect and arson prior to demolition.

== Religious architecture ==
=== Church of the Epiphany ===
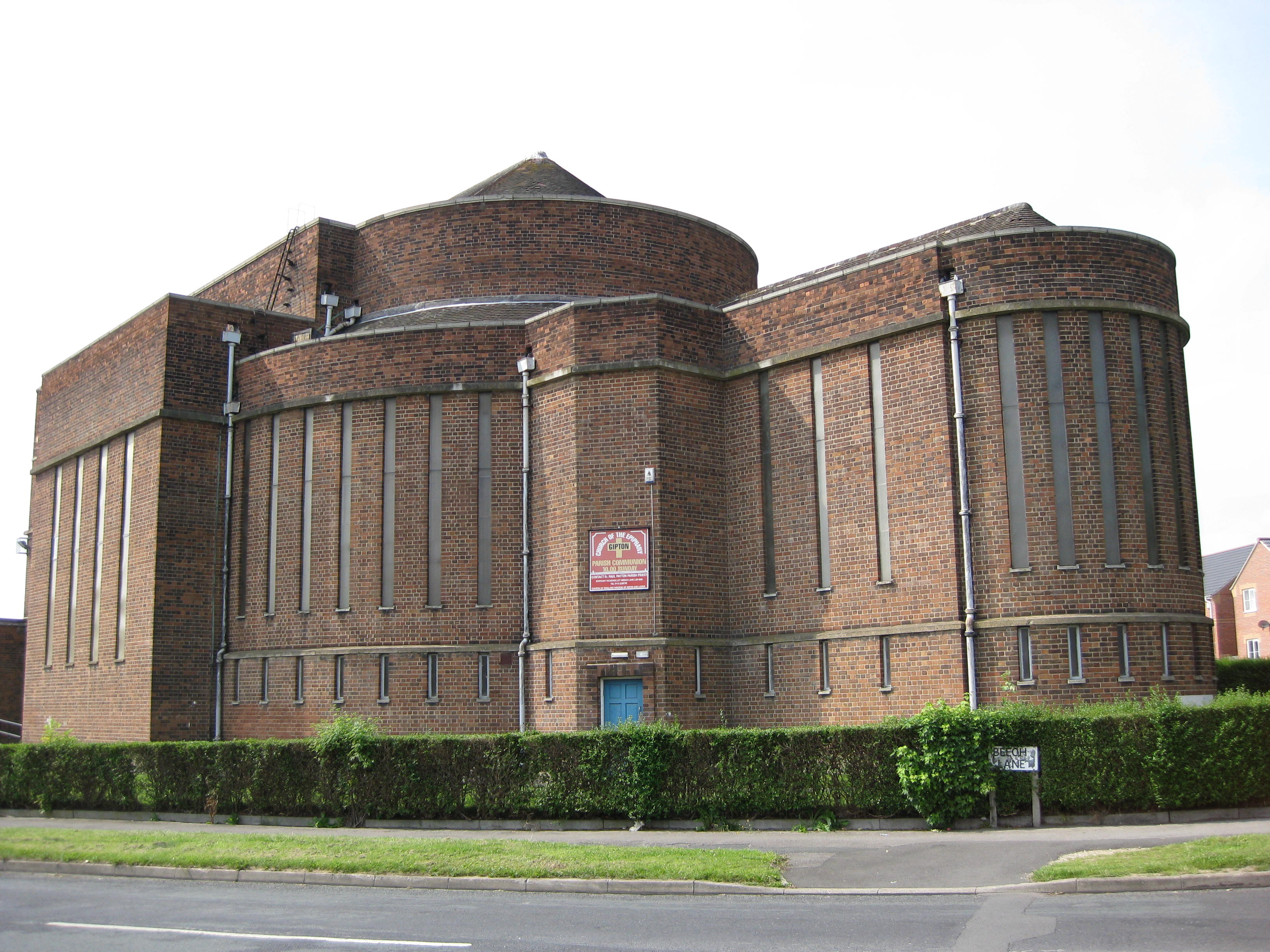
Church of the Epiphany

The Church of the Epiphany at the junction of Amberton Road and Beech Lane was constructed in 1936–38 with plans that were prepared by N.F. Cachemaille-Day, and is a Grade I listed building. The Epiphany was built by Armitage Hodgson of Leeds, with the foundation stone being laid on 12 July 1937. The church was consecrated by Geoffrey Lunt, Bishop of Ripon, on 14 May 1938 in the presence of Mary, Princess Royal and Countess of Harewood. The full title of the church is "The Bishop Burroughs (of Ripon) Memorial Church", but it is never used.

=== Church of St Nicholas ===
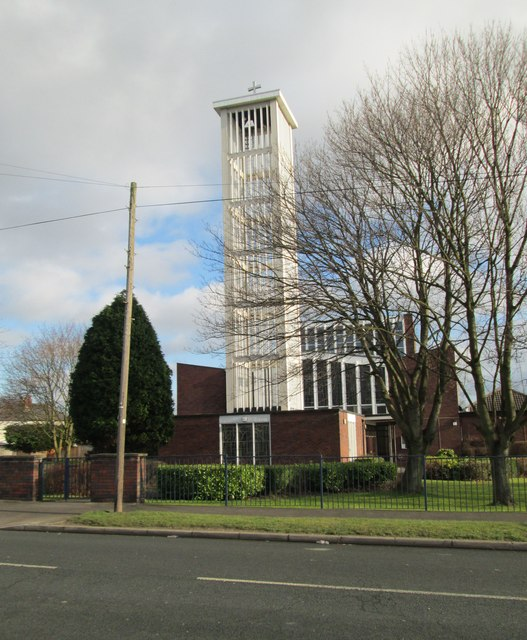
Church of St Nicholas

Work began on the Church hall in 1938 when 10 acres of land was purchased from Leeds Corporation at the cost of £6,766. 11s.7d by Holdright. The hall hosted dances, whist drives, parties, meetings and jumble sales. They were staged to raise funds to provide St Nicholas' Church and school. Holdright moved to St Stephen's, Skipton and was succeeded as parish priest by Herbert Backhouse who pursued the same course. Their efforts were realised when the third parish priest, Frank O'Driscoll, was given the "go-ahead". The £74,000 church was opened on 26 July 1961 by George Dwyer, Bishop of Leeds. The church seats 550 and the opening was marked by the celebration of Pontifical High Mass. The fabric cost £58,000 and the furnishings £16,000. There is a 70 feet (21 m) high campanile over the baptistery. On top is an illuminated cross which can be seen from the surrounding hillsides. The church is part of Blessed Edmund Sykes parish.

=== Gipton Methodist Church ===
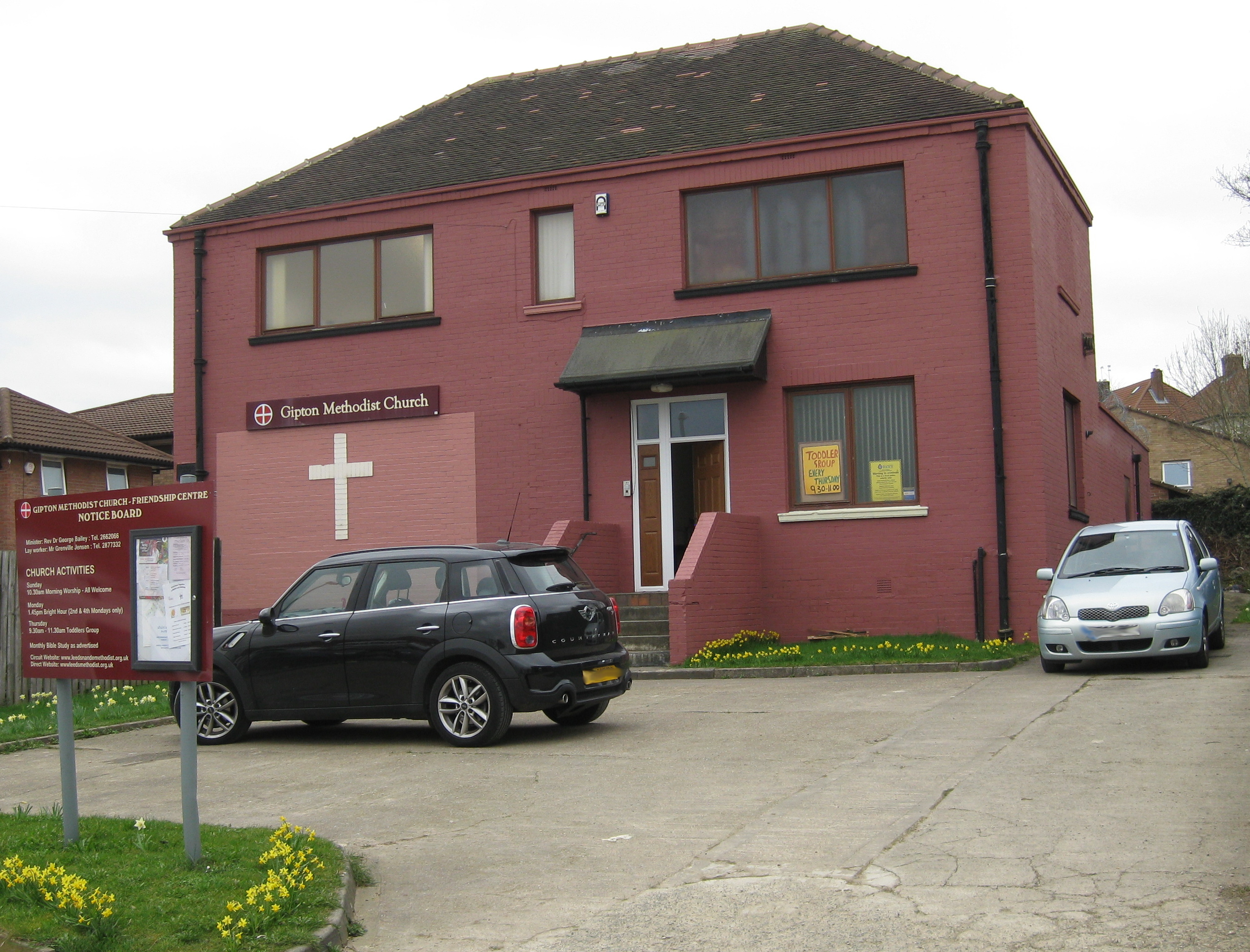
Gipton Methodist Church

Gipton Methodist Church was a small urban church on the edge of housing estates, which has now closed: its final service took place on 27 March 2022. An earlier church had been opened in May 1936: members of the church had transferred from the former Lady Lane Church in central Leeds and retained the name of "Lady Lane Methodist Church".

Gipton Methodist Church was part of a local Anglican-Methodist Covenant arrangement with the Church of the Epiphany, which held shared joint Lent and Advent groups and services and Songs of Praise services, together with parishioners from St Nicholas RC Church.

== Education ==
=== Primary ===
The primary schools located in Gipton are:

- Wykebeck Primary School, Brander Street
- St Augustine's RC Primary School, St Wilfrids Circus
- St Nicholas RC Primary School, Oakwood Lane
- Oakwood Primary Academy, North Farm Road

== Amenities ==
=== Henry Barran Centre ===
Henry Barran Community Centre is situated on Amberton Road, within Gipton. The original building was constructed circa 1920 and has undergone various changes to the space and additional extension built, the latest of which was completed in 1994. The centre is used as a multi-use community facility providing office/administration facilities, workshops, canteen, nursery and youth club. The community group Gipton Together are also based at Henry Barran Centre with the aim of providing the young residents of Gipton and Harehills with a safe space to go in the evenings and use arts and sports projects to act as crime prevention and crime diversionary alternatives.

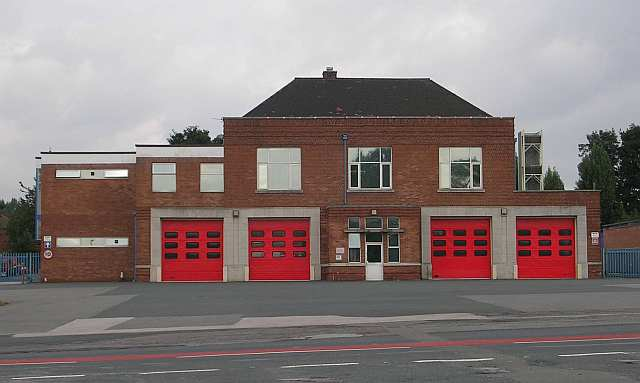
Gipton Fire Station 1937 - 2015. Reopened as The Old Fire Station community hub after renovation in 2017

=== The Old Fire Station ===
Community centre situated on Gipton Approach. The centre aims to be "A space where local people can come to socialise, access support and simply relax and have fun. An opportunity for children and young people, adults and older people to maximise their potential, and improve their well being and quality of life all under one roof".

Formerly Leeds Eastern and then Gipton Fire Station, originally opened in 1937 with extensions in the 1980s and during full refurbishment to become a community hub opened in 2017. A heritage group of former fire fighters have curated a small museum that is open to the public celebrating the history of the building. Home to eight charities; Zest, Barnardo's, Space2, Healthwatch Leeds, Slate, GIPSIL, People In Action and The Old Fire Station charity. Range of activities and events including; cafe, nursery, cookery school, health & wellbeing, adult learning, art & crafts, activities for people with learning difficulties, gardening and housing support. Car boot sales last Sunday of the month April to September. Film night last Friday of the month. Rooms available for private hire.

=== Amenities ===
The main supermarket on the estate is the Lidl at the lower end of Oak Tree Drive. There is a parade of shops situated on Coldcotes Drive that include a Co-operative Food store, a Premier Store, a William Hill Bookmakers, numerous Takeaway restaurants, and Gipton Working Men's Club. There is currently a small off-licence called Gipton Convenience Store and the Gipton Housing Office on Foundry Avenue. The northern side of the estate is served by a parade of shops along Oakwood Lane. The parade currently contains a variety of shops and amenities such as a Co-operative Food store, café, Undertakers, Boots Pharmacy, Dentist, Launderette & Hair Salon. The local area is also serviced by a small Tesco Express situated on the edge of Montagu Avenue and Easterly Road. The southern side of the estate is served by the amenities on York Road which includes the newly opened convenience store Family Shopper.

=== Amenities nearby ===
The nearest large supermarkets are Asda in Killingbeck and Tesco Extra in Seacroft. Tesco Superstore in Oakwood and a Morrison's in Harehills. Cross Gates is the closest shopping area; its indoor shopping centre also provides the closest railway station to the area. The nearest bus station is the Seacroft bus station, which provides residents of Gipton with regular access to amenities throughout the city of Leeds. The estate is also only a short distance from Roundhay Park, one of the biggest city parks in Europe. providing residents with access to 700 acres of parkland, lakes, woodlands, formal gardens, several cafes, two playgrounds, a skate park and the popular visitor attraction Tropical World.

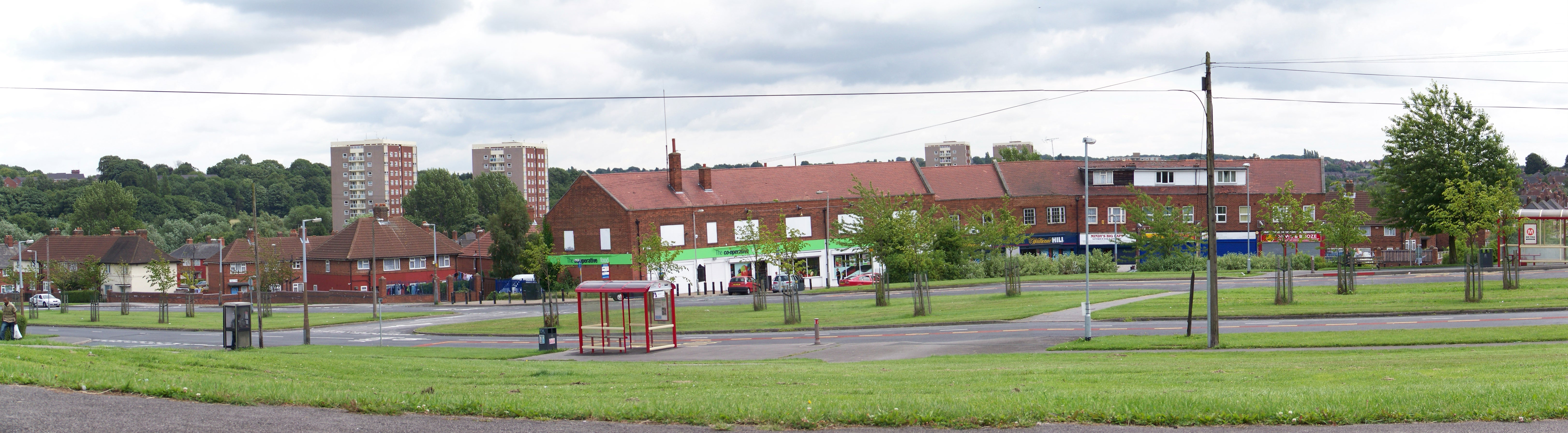
Coldcotes Circus

== Notable people ==
- Former Elmet (Wetherby, Garforth, Cross Gates) MP, Colin Burgon is from Gipton.
- Author Jack Sheffield (born 1945, writer of humorous books such as "Teacher, Teacher") grew up in Gipton.

== Cultural references ==
- Gipton is mentioned in the song "With Goth on Our Side" by the band Half Man Half Biscuit on their 2000 album Trouble over Bridgwater.
- Gipton: the Musical was written by Boff Whalley, guitarist from the band Chumbawamba. The play ran at the West Yorkshire Playhouse in Leeds in 2015.
- Gipton police station was the feature of a three-part Channel 4 documentary The Nick filmed in 1992 and 1993 and shown in 1994 depicting juvenile crime, armed robbery, delinquency, drug crime and vehicle crime in Gipton and its surrounding environs.

== See also ==
- Listed buildings in Leeds (Gipton and Harehills Ward)
