= Killingbeck =

District of Leeds, West Yorkshire, England

Coordinates: 53.80298°N 1.48220°W

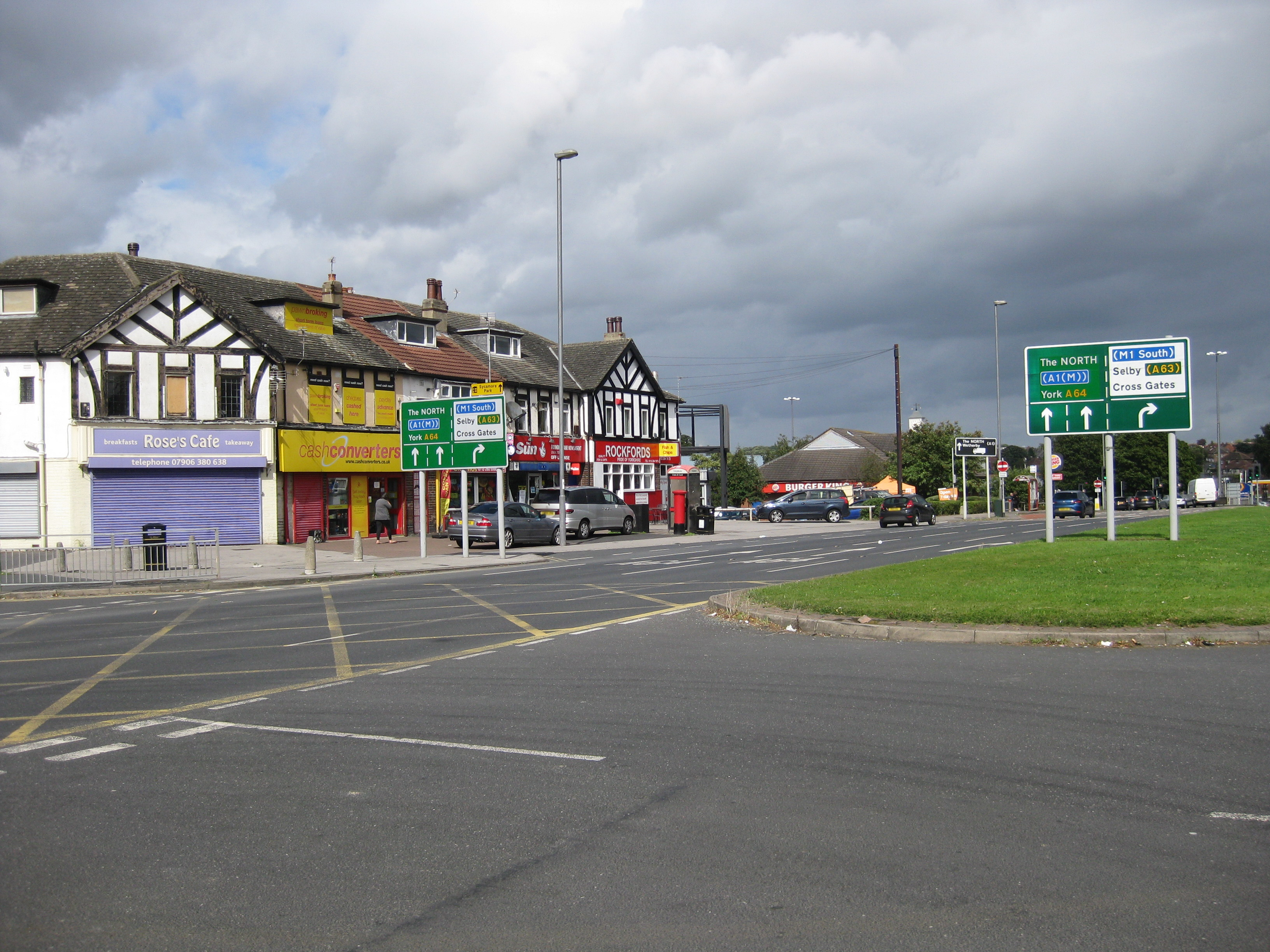
Shops on York Road crossroads with Foundry Lane and Crossgates Road

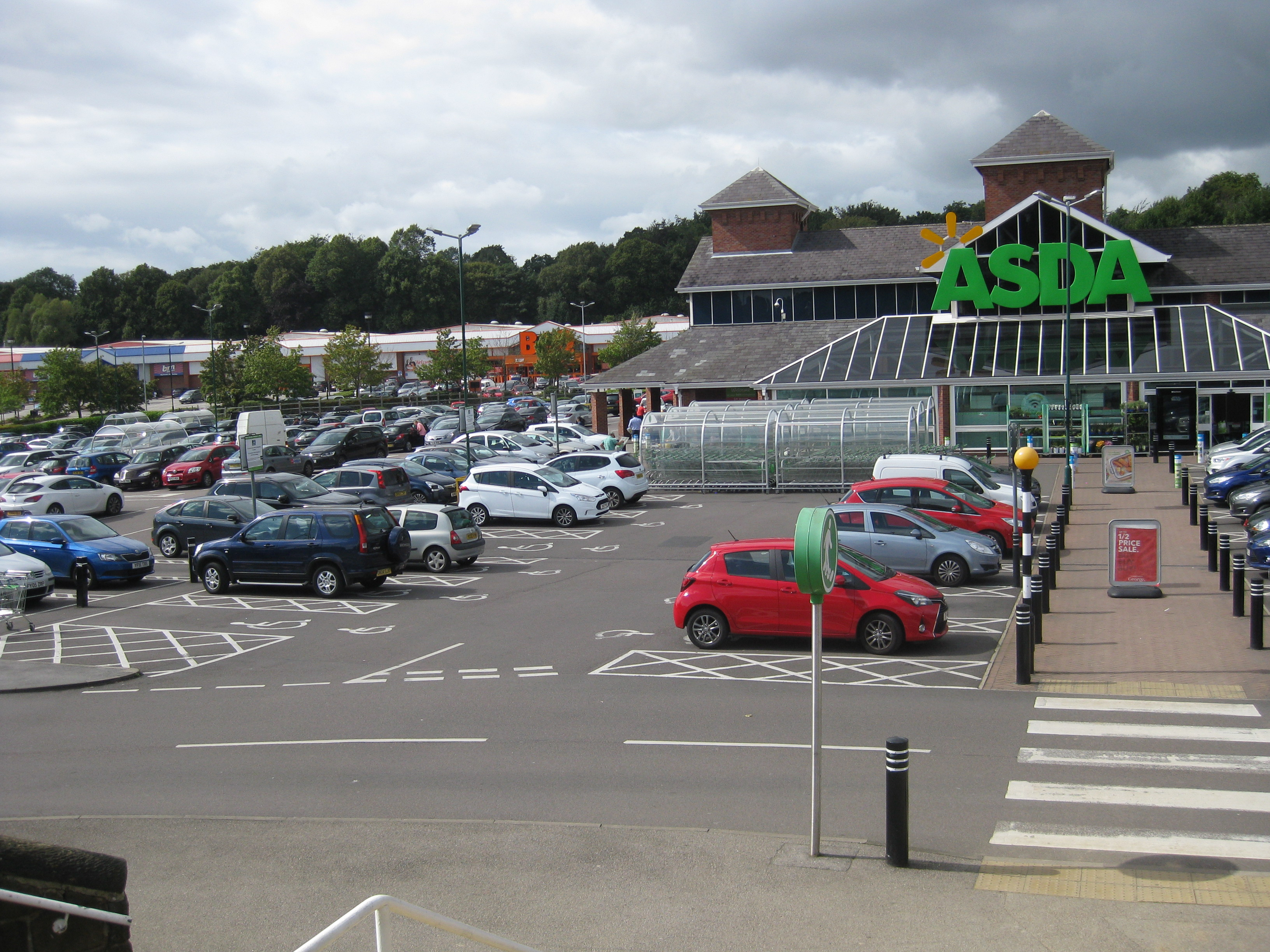
Killingbeck Retail Park

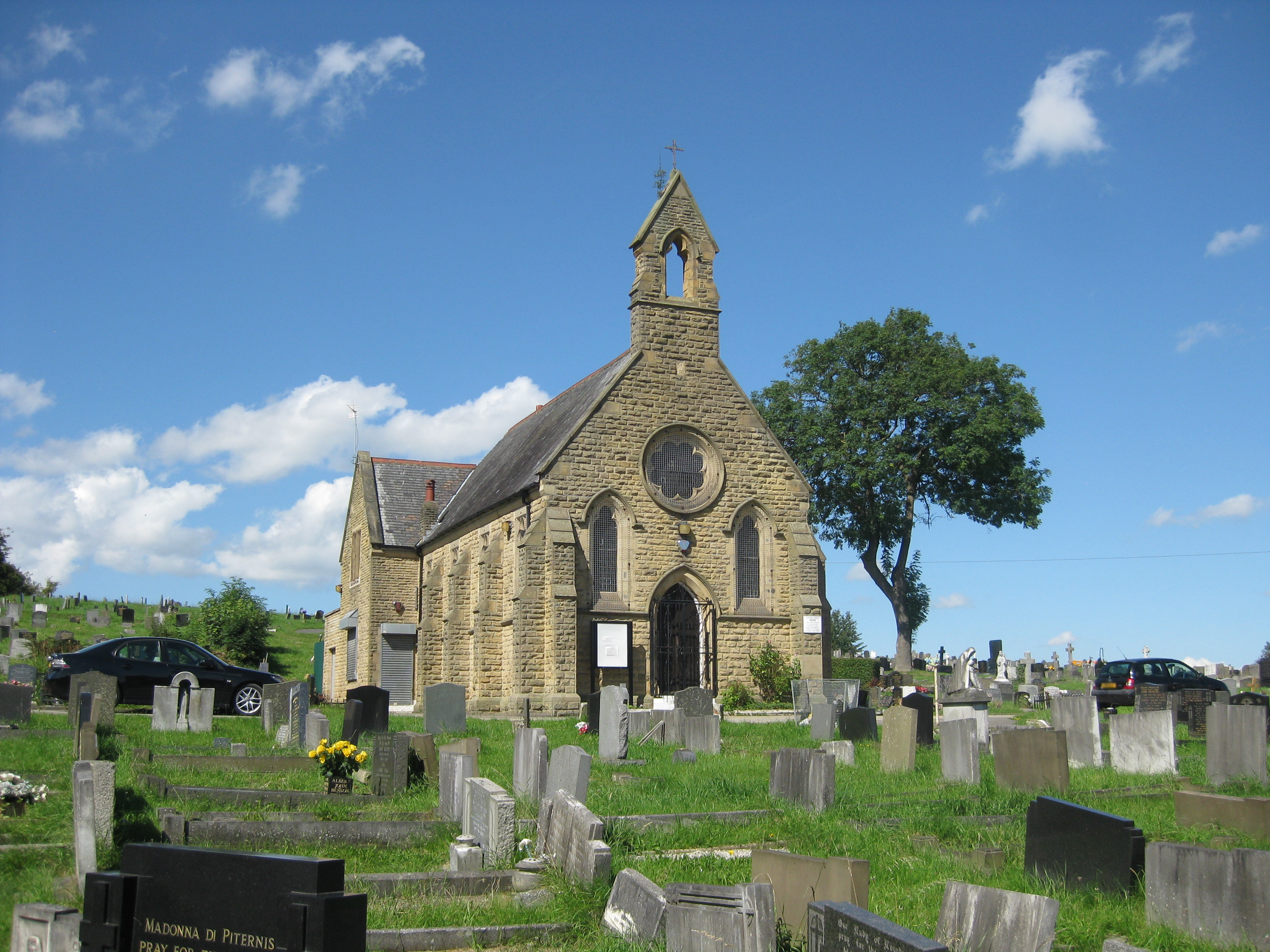
Killingbeck cemetery chapel

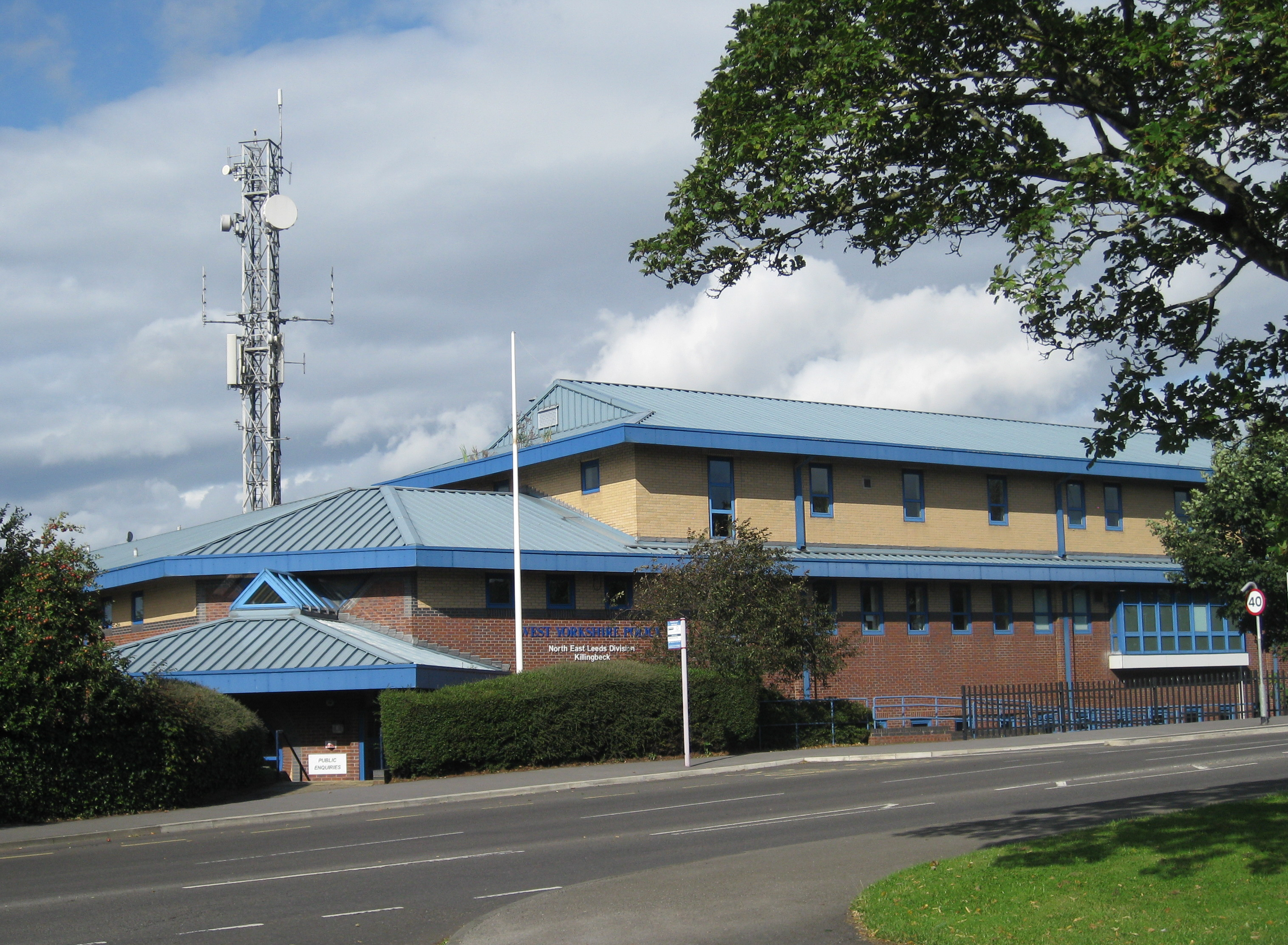
Former Killingbeck Police Station

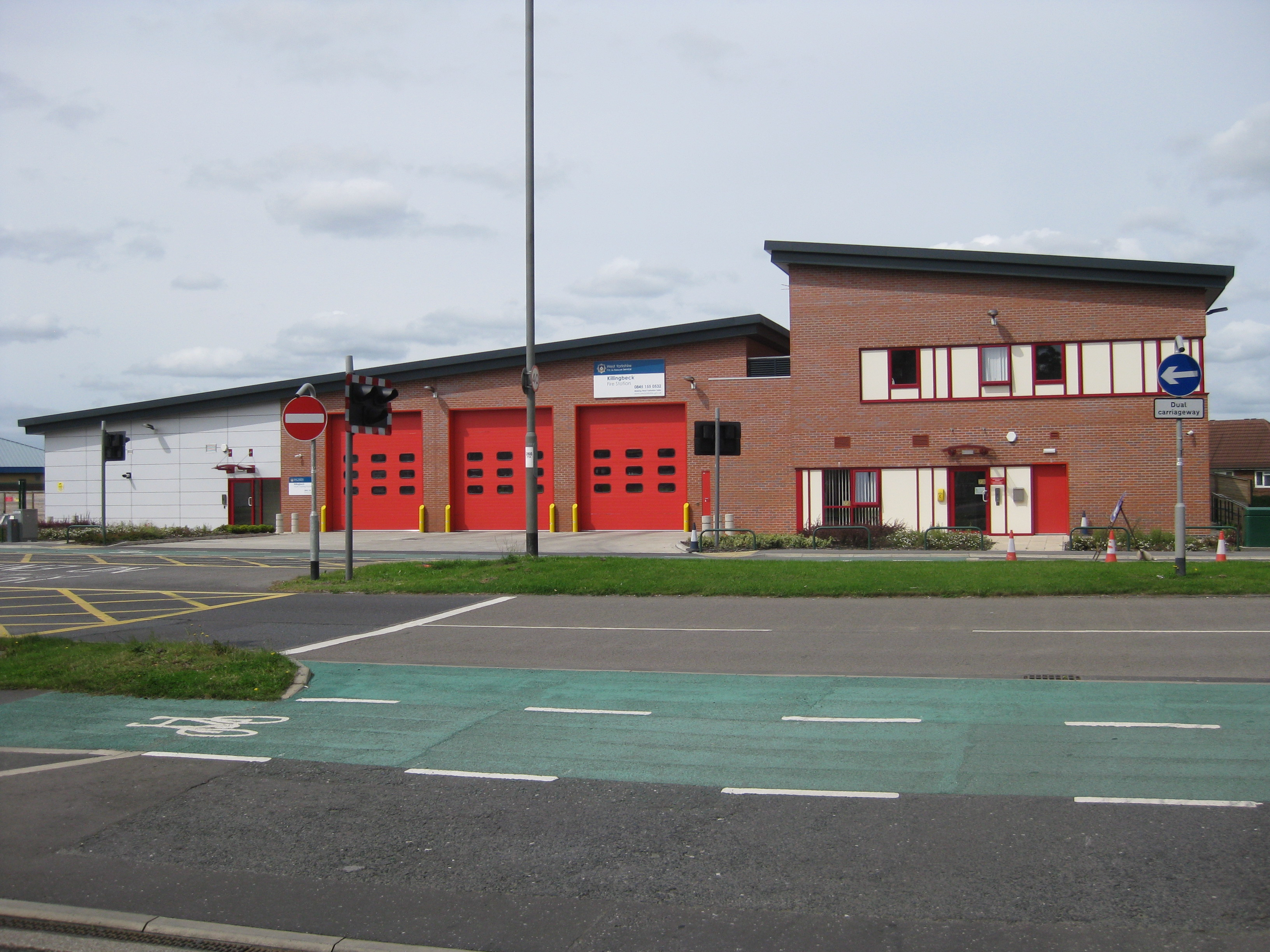
Killingbeck Fire Station

Killingbeck is a district of east Leeds, West Yorkshire, England named after the Killingbeck family, historic local landowners, and is situated between Seacroft to the north, Cross Gates and Whitkirk to the east, Gipton to the west, Halton Moor to the south, Halton to the south-east and Osmondthorpe to the south-west.

It sits in the Killingbeck & Seacroft ward of Leeds City Council and Leeds East parliamentary constituency.

== History ==
The Yorkshire Hundred Rolls for 1274 and 1275 record the area as owned by the Knights Templar of Newsam, the gift of Walter de Kelingbec. Later records show Killingbecks of Chapel Allerton were local landowners: John Killingbeck was Mayor of Leeds in 1677 and his son John was Vicar of Leeds from 1690 to 1716. The Killingbeck estate was situated north of the York Road, and east of Wyke Beck, including what is now Killingbeck Cemetery and the shopping centre. The estate also owned Manston Hall on the south side of York Road, which is now the site of Seacroft Hospital. The estate was purchased by Leeds Corporation in 1898, and the 18th century Killingbeck Hall was the starting building for Killingbeck Hospital, which was closed in 1997, the Hall itself having been demolished in 1978. Killingbeck colliery was south of the York Road and the railway line in what is now Primrose Valley Park, Halton.

== Population ==
Killingbeck had a population of 6,436 in 2011.

== General description ==
The area is small and its borders difficult to define but runs along York Road, east of Wykebeck Valley Road. From this junction north of York Road is a large area of fields and woodland, Killingbeck Fields, which is a Local Nature Reserve. Immediately east of this is Killingbeck Retail Park (including an Asda superstore)and Acorn business park. On the south side of the York Road up to this point is housing which is in the LS14 and LS15 postcode, and also in the electoral ward. To the east of the retail park is Oak Tree Lane, which leads to the newest housing development on the site of the former Killingbeck Hospital. To the east of this is Killingbeck Cemetery, which was established in 1895 for the Roman Catholic community of Leeds. To the east of this is older housing developments, on Lyme Chase, and The Oval estate, which occupy the land up to Foundry Road. There is a row of shops on the north side leading up to this junction. On the south side is Seacroft Hospital.

Beyond Foundry Lane are Killingbeck Police Station and Killingbeck Fire Station, leading to the Parklands housing estate which may be considered part of Seacroft.

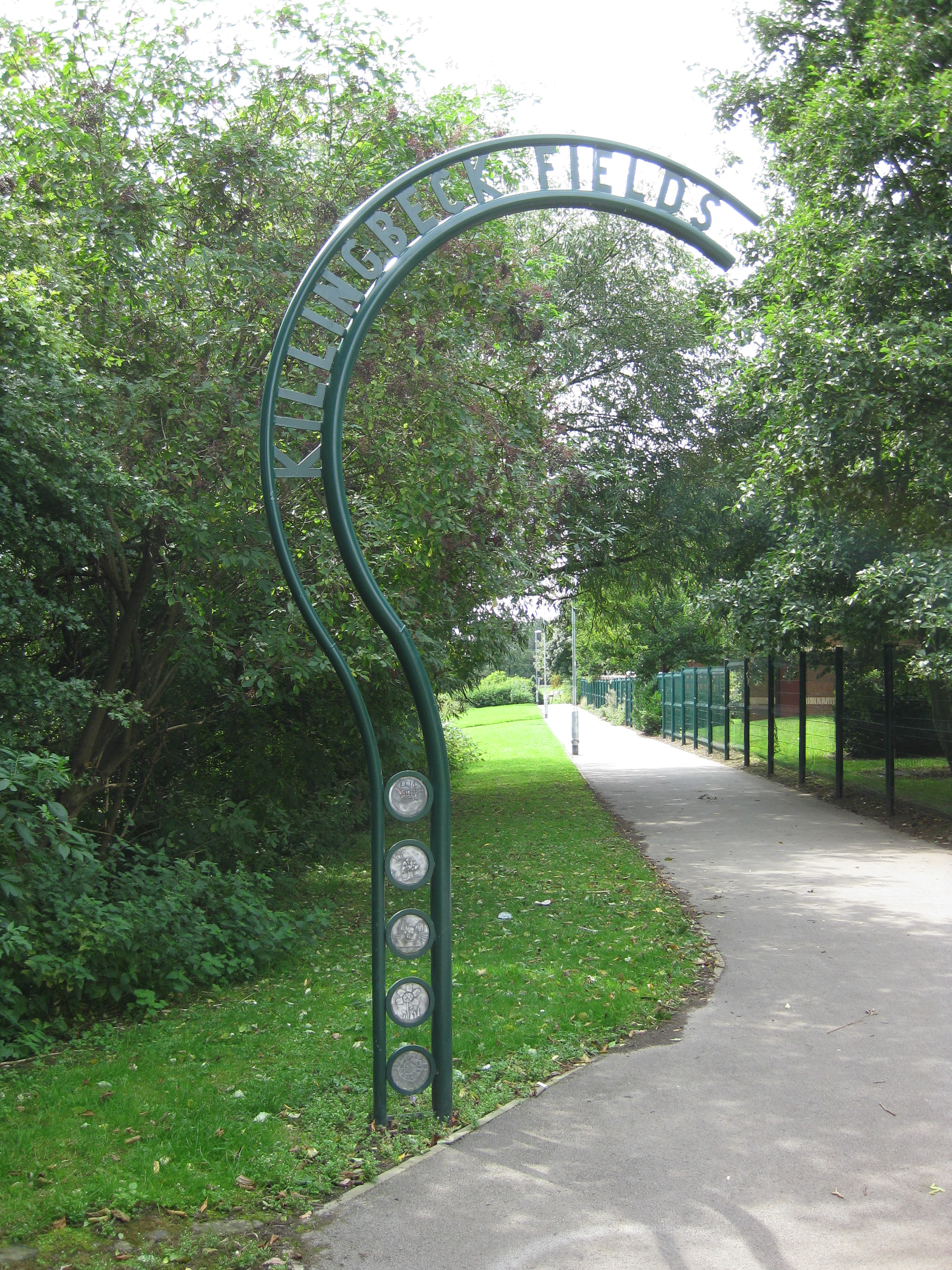
Killingbeck Fields entrance sign

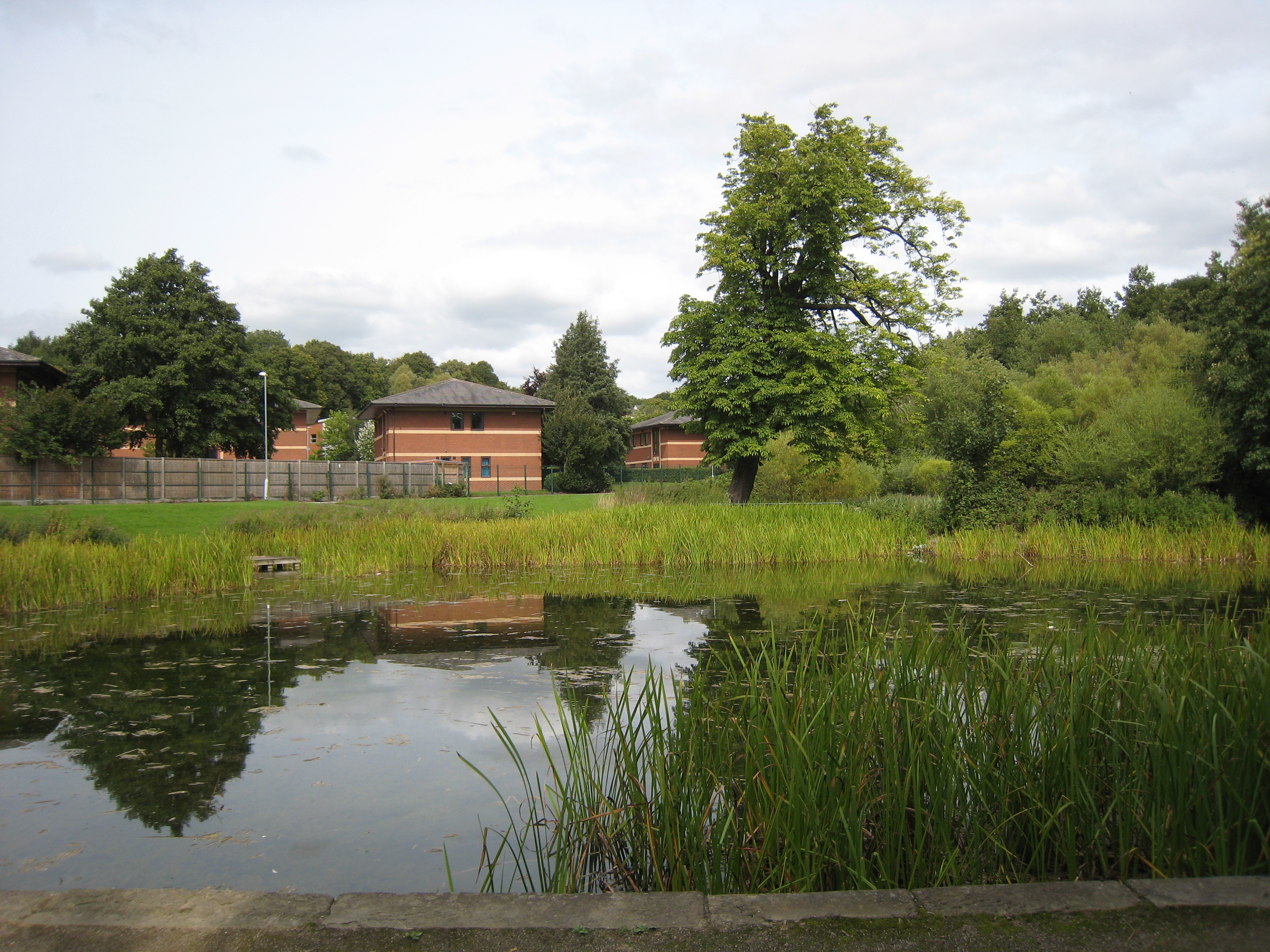
Killingbeck Pond, in Killingbeck Fields, with Acorn Business Park behind

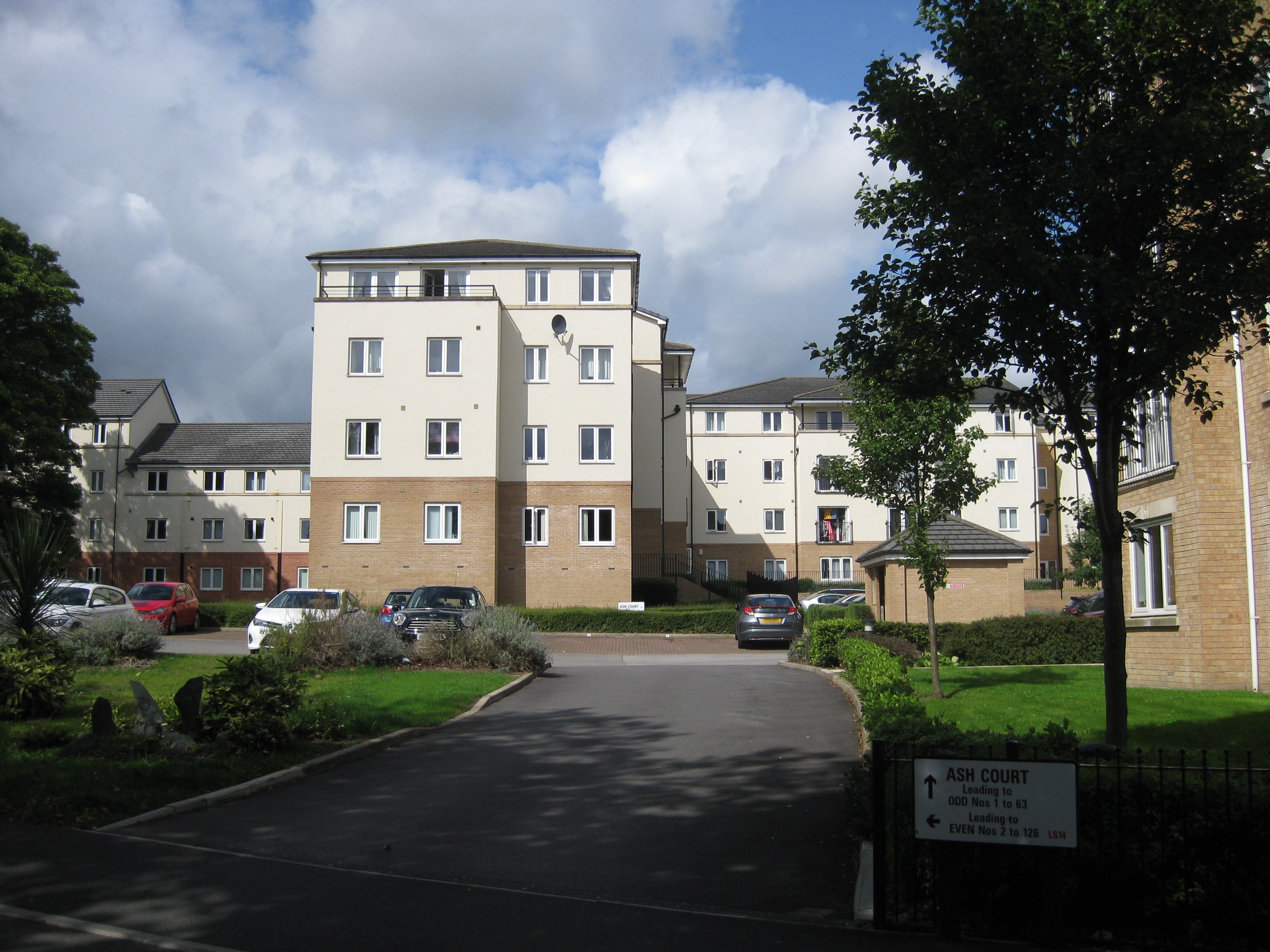
New (2017) flats on the former hospital site

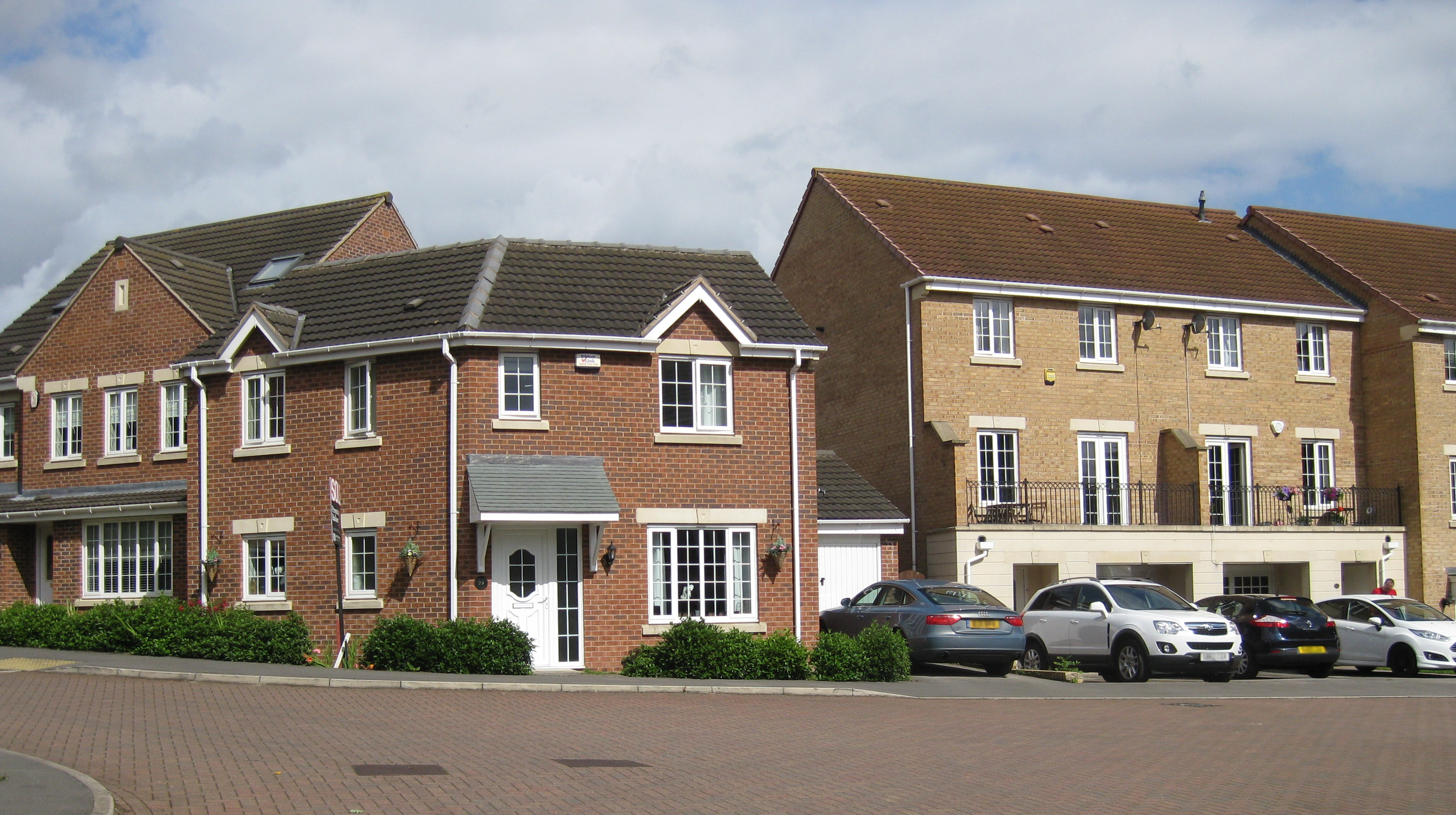
New (2017) houses on the former hospital site

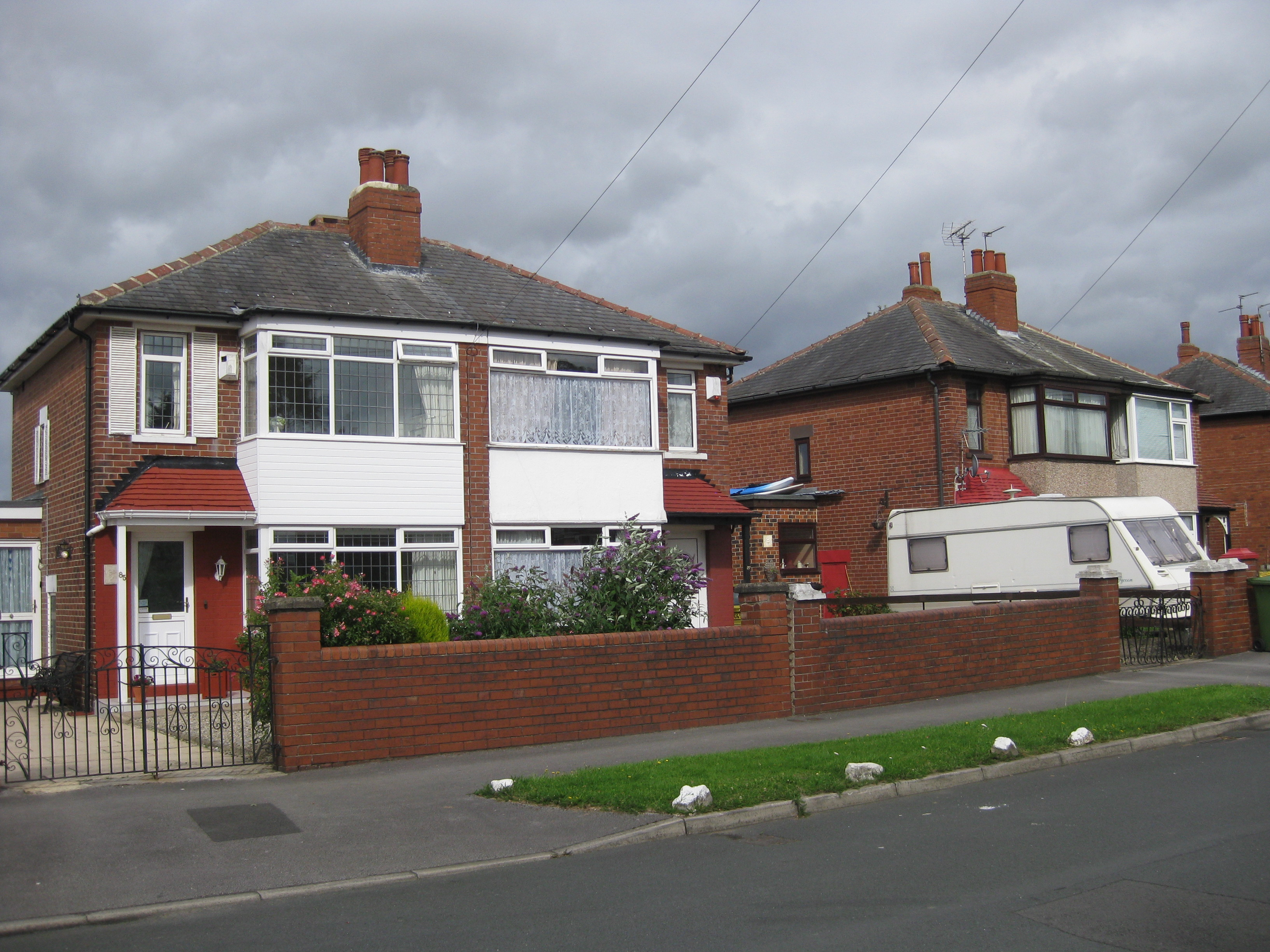
Houses on The Oval

== See also ==
- Listed buildings in Seacroft and Killingbeck
