= Seacroft Hospital =

Hospital in Leeds, West Yorkshire, England

- Leeds Teaching Hospitals NHS Trust
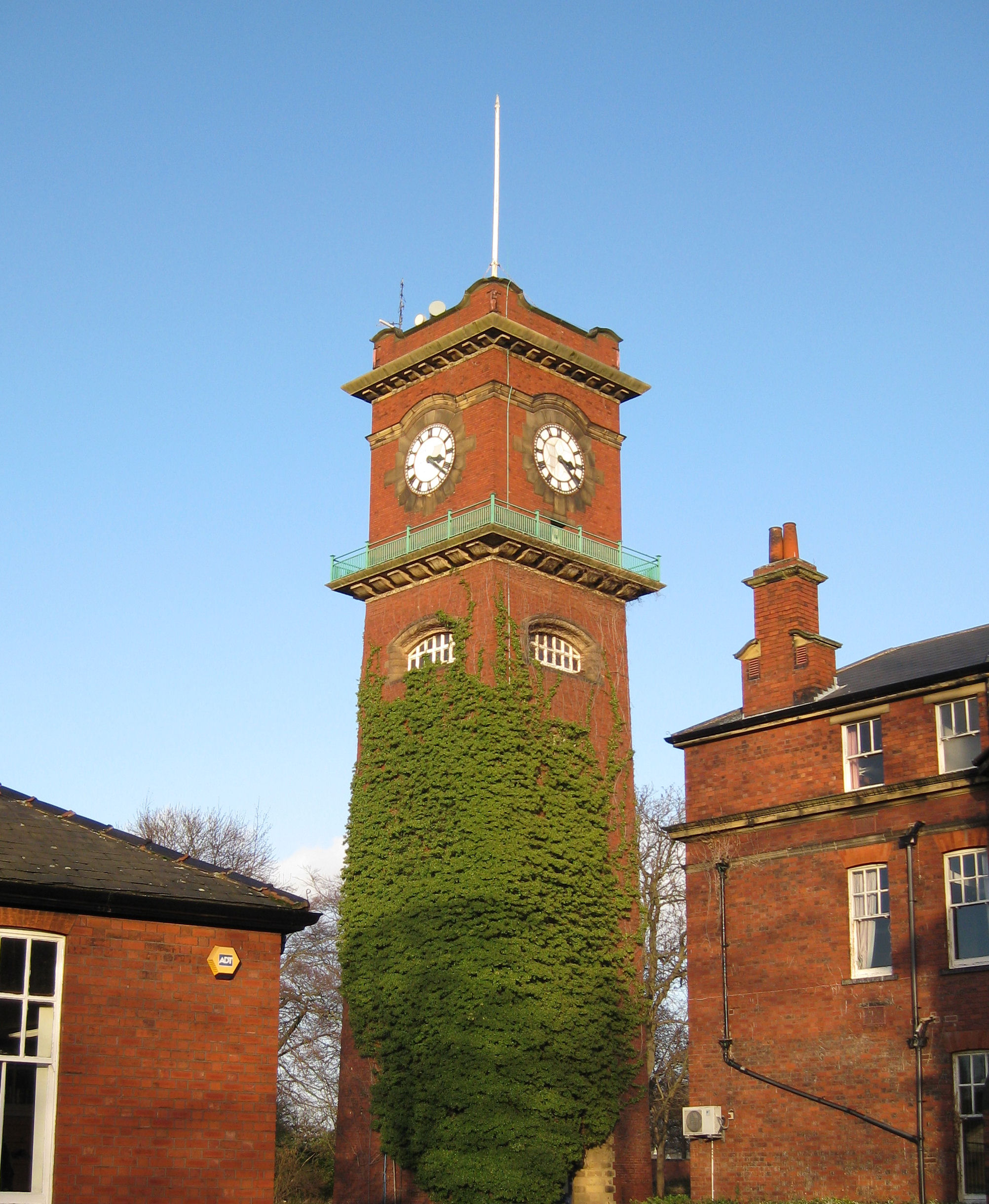
- Seacroft Hospital Tower

- Location within West Yorkshire

Geography
- Location: York Road LS14, Leeds, England
- Coordinates: 53.8056°N 1.4708°W

Organisation
- Care system: NHS
- Type: General

Services
- Emergency department: No
- Beds: 121

History
- Founded: 1904

Links
- Website: www.leedsth.nhs.uk/patients/aboutus/hospitals/seacroft.php
- Lists: Hospitals in England

Seacroft Hospital is a hospital located on York Road in the area of Seacroft, Leeds, West Yorkshire, England and is operated by the Leeds Teaching Hospitals NHS Trust. It is home to the Rob Burrow Centre for Motor Neurone Disease and acts as one of Leeds' three community diagnostic centres, designed to offer "a broad range of diagnostic tests closer to patients' homes".

== History ==
A decision was made in 1893 to establish a facility to care for people with infectious diseases. A tented hospital was created at the Seacroft Estate, which had been the location of the former Manston Hall. The present facility was built in 1904: there were beds for 482 patients when it first opened. The clock tower, which also serves as a water tower holding 28,000 gallons of water, was built at the same time; it is a Grade II listed building. The hospital joined the National Health Service in 1948.

By 2008, many of the hospital buildings were in a poor state of repair and the health authority considered selling off the older parts of the hospital for redevelopment.

The hospital was noted in 2009 for its unique and positive use of the Nintendo video game Wii Fit to assist patients with prosthetic limbs in learning how to use them effectively.

Part of the site was sold to the Homes and Communities Agency in 2014 for around £6 million. In 2015 the developers Keepmoat and Strata announced their plans to build about 700 homes there.

== Developments ==
In September 2002 a state of the art catering unit was built on the site, The Receipt And Distribution Unit, RADU. It was opened by TV Celebrity chef Brian Turner. It provides over 3,000 patients meals twice daily 365 days a year, to all the main hospitals in the Leeds area: these are supplemented by any special dietary needs plus daily bread and milk. In October 2002 Loyd Grossman and a team of leading chefs designed "leading chef" dishes for the menu.

The Seacroft Specialist Rehabilitation Centre opened in June 2006.

In June 2024, construction work on the Rob Burrow Centre for Motor Neurone Disease was initiated in the hospital grounds: rugby player Rob Burrow had a hand in its design and creation. The centre opened in November 2025.

== See also ==
- List of hospitals in England
- Listed buildings in Seacroft and Killingbeck
