= West Yorkshire Fire & Rescue Service =

County-wide, statutory emergency service

Operational area
- Country: England
- County: West Yorkshire

Agency overview
- Established: 1974
- Employees: 961 (2016 frontline staff)

Facilities and equipment
- Stations: 40
- Engines: 47

Website
- www.westyorksfire.gov.uk

The West Yorkshire Fire & Rescue Service (WYFRS) is the county-wide, statutory emergency fire and rescue service for the metropolitan county of West Yorkshire, England. It is administered by a joint authority of 22 people who are appointed annually from the five metropolitan boroughs of West Yorkshire, known as the Fire & Rescue Authority.

West Yorkshire covers an area of approximately 800 square miles (2,100 km^{2}) which includes remote moorland, rural villages, large towns, cities, busy motorways and 'A' roads, as well as Leeds Bradford Airport. The fire and rescue service's headquarters are located in Birkenshaw, Bradford. There is also a large training centre at Birkenshaw used by other authorities besides West Yorkshire.

In 2006, the service was listed as being the fourth largest in England (behind London, the West Midlands and Greater Manchester fire services) with 1,600 wholetime firefighters and 199 retained. It has 47 pumping appliances based at 40 stations, sub-divided into five districts: Bradford, Calderdale, Kirklees, Leeds and Wakefield.

== History ==
The brigade was formed in 1974 when the unitary county of West Yorkshire was created and was an amalgamation of smaller brigades across the county. These included the West Riding County Fire Service, Bradford City Fire Brigade, Dewsbury County Borough Fire Brigade, Halifax County Borough Fire Brigade, Huddersfield County Borough Fire, Leeds City Fire Brigade and Wakefield City Fire Brigade. At its inception, the WYFRS operated fifty-two stations across the five districts. Today the fire service operates out of 40 fire stations

The service's headquarters is at Oakroyd Hall in Birkenshaw; the hall is a grade II listed building that has housed the headquarters since 1964, when it was the headquarters for the West Riding Fire Service (WRFS). Previous to that, the WRFS headquarters was at Huddersfield, though its training centre had moved to Birkenshaw in 1961.

After a number of firefighter deaths at notable fires in the 1990s (Gillender street in Bow, East London [1991] and the Sun Valley poultry factory fire in Hereford [1993]), coupled with the publishing of the Fennell Report into the King's Cross fire of 1987, WYFRS developed an incident command policy that encompassed an at-incident dynamic risk assessment and an organisational structure assessment for major fires. This policy was driven forward by central government and after some refinement was adopted in 1999.

In April 2014, the service's emergency call response centre was moved from the Birkenshaw site to a location in Leeds, which also subsequently became the call centre for the South Yorkshire Fire & Rescue (SYFR), in the event of a control room failure at SYFR control in Sheffield.

== Performance ==
Every fire and rescue service in England and Wales is periodically subjected to a statutory inspection by His Majesty's Inspectorate of Constabulary and Fire & Rescue Services (HMICFRS). The inspections investigate how well the service performs in each of three areas. On a scale of outstanding, good, requires improvement and inadequate, West Yorkshire Fire & Rescue Service was rated as follows:

HMICFRS Inspection West Yorkshire
Area	Rating	Rating 2021/22	Description
Effectiveness	Good	Good	How effective is the fire and rescue service at keeping people safe and secure from fire and other risks?
Efficiency	Good	Good	How efficient is the fire and rescue service at keeping people safe and secure from fire and other risks?
People	Good	Good	How well does the fire and rescue service look after its people?

== Fire stations ==
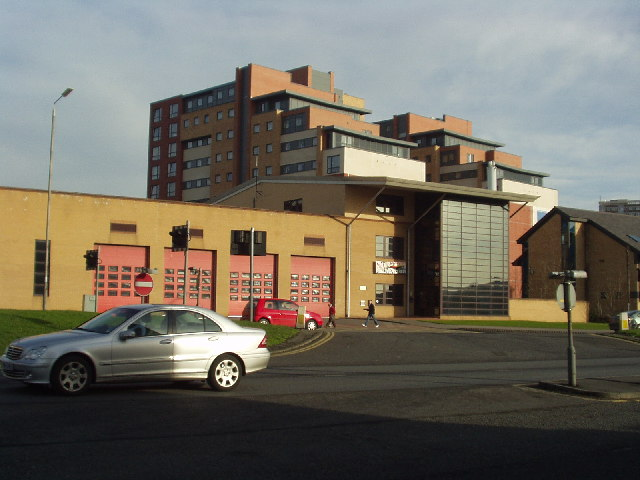
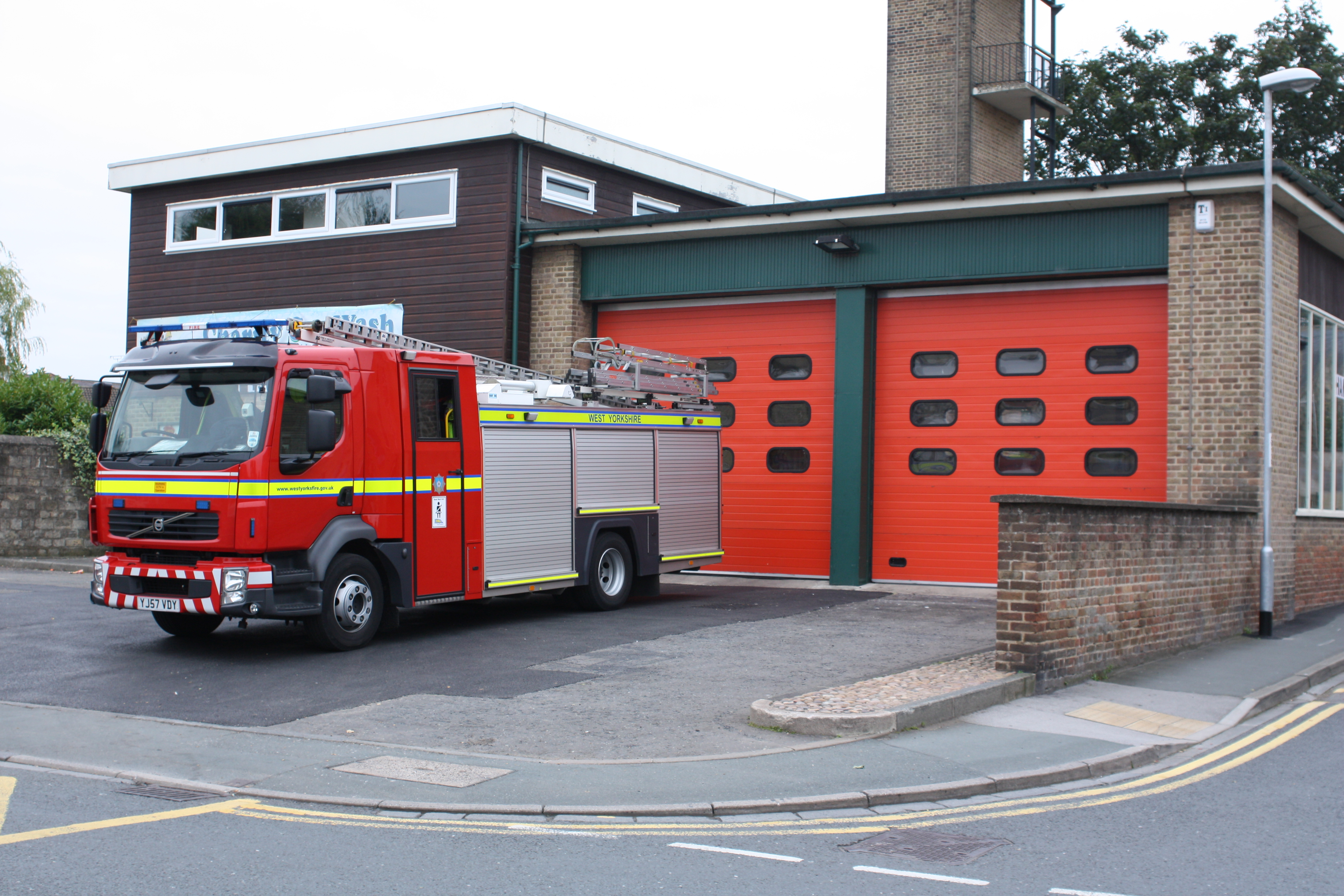
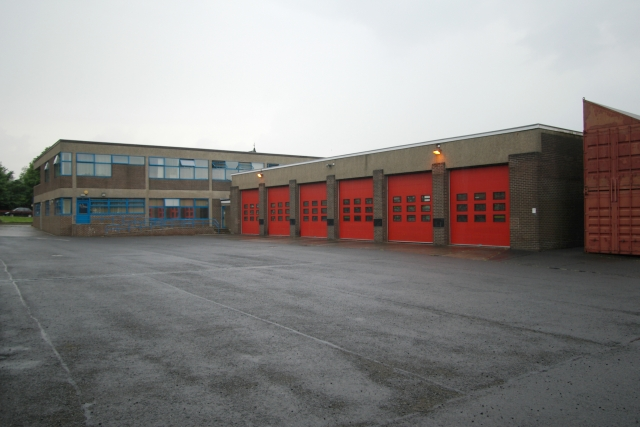
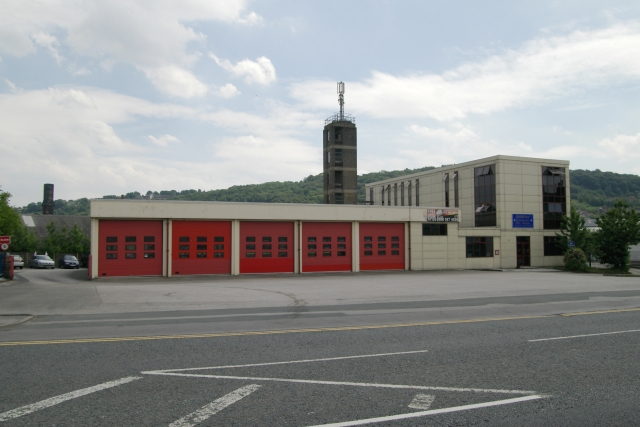
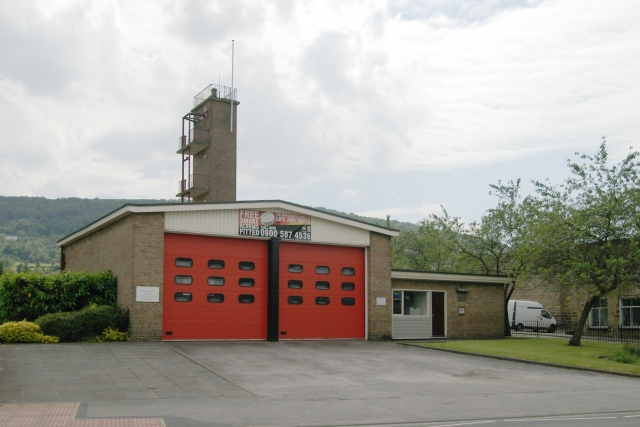
Clockwise from top left: Some of the service's fire stations in Leeds, Wetherby, Otley, Keighley and Halifax

West Yorkshire Fire & Rescue Service operates a headquarters and training centre at Birkenshaw, plus 40 fire stations grouped into five districts:

- Bradford District
- Calderdale District
- Kirklees District
- Leeds District
- Wakefield District

The number of fire stations has changed in recent years as stations are closed, merged, or new ones opened.

Stanningley fire station was opened in February 2003 to replace the two closed stations at Bramley and Pudsey.

Pontefract fire station opened in 2012 to replace the older Pontefract station with Knottingley fire station closing completely.

South Kirkby fire station replaced South Elmsall fire station (wholetime) and Hemsworth fire station (retained) in 2015.

Shipley fire station moved to a new site in May 2017 on Valley Road, closer to Bradford. The new station replaced the old Shipley fire station (located in Saltaire) and Idle fire station, which closed completely.

WYFRS planned to merge Moortown and Cookridge fire stations on one site. Outline permission to redevelop the site for housing was approved in June 2017.

Keighley fire station is due to be demolished and a completely new structure will be built on the site. £2.2 million was set aside for the project in 2019, however, the Covid pandemic halted works on the site.

Cleckheaton Fire Station which housed the Technical Rescue Unit closed in 2025. It was relocated to the new Spen Valley Community Fire Station on the grounds of the Birkenshaw Headquarters.

=== Duty crewing systems ===
The Wholetime Duty System (WDS) is when a fire station is staffed 24/7, and involves four watches of firefighters who work two day shifts from 08:00 to 19:00, two night shifts from 19:00 to 08:00, and then take the following four complete days off.

The Day Crewing System (DCS) is where firefighters respond from the fire station during the day from 08:00 to 17:00, and become on-call retained firefighters outside of these hours. Stations operate on either a four days on/then four days off, or a two days on/two days off/three days on basis.

The Day-Crewed Close-Call System (DC/CCS) is where firefighters respond from the station on a two days on/two days off/three days on basis between the hours of 08:00 and 17:00, and then respond from on-site accommodation out of hours. The close call system is where the firefighters work a set number of hours annually, so the shift patterns are managed locally. Ranks of station manager and above can work a Flexible Duty System, with the remainder of the staff being on a retained basis.

The Retained Duty System (RDS) is where all firefighters respond from home or from their usual jobs on a retained "on-call" basis, and are therefore required to live within five minutes of the fire station, or work within five minutes of the fire station if they are able and willing to respond from work Firefighters are alerted by electronic pager.

=== Station closures ===
In recent years the service has sought to rationalise its stations. In 2013, Marsden fire station was closed, while in 2015 Gipton and Stanks fire stations in East Leeds were replaced with a single fire station between the two sites at Killingbeck. Of the eight firefighters based at Marsden, three left the service, whilst five transferred to the retained station at Slaithwaite. The fire appliance from Marsden was moved as a cover fire engine at Huddersfield. Haworth fire station, which was staffed by retained firefighters, was closed permanently in 2014.

In the same year, Batley and Dewsbury's fire stations were merged into a single site in Dewsbury and Brighouse and Elland fire stations were also amalgamated into one fire station in Rastrick that is nearer to the M62 motorway. the stations at Otley and Rawdon were due to be closed and replaced with a combined site located in the Menston area, but these plans were abandoned after a suitable site could not be found. Cleckheaton Fire Station which housed the Technical Rescue Unit closed in 2025 after decades in operation, due to a newer and better facility being opened on the grounds of the new Birkenshaw Fire Headquarters, Spen Valley Community Fire Station. The new station will continue to house the Technical Rescue Unit.

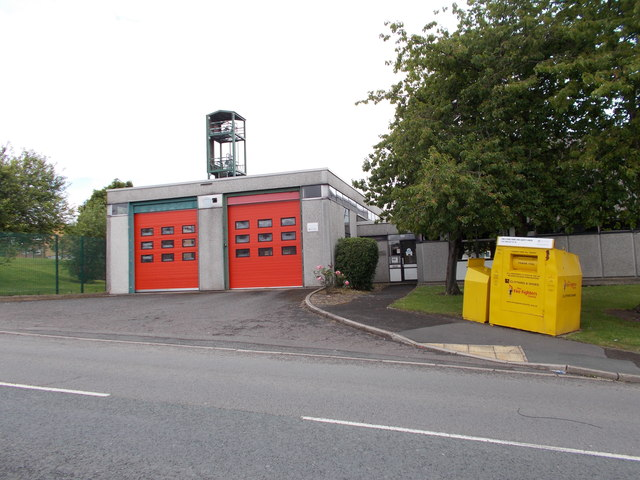
Stanks fire station at Swarcliffe (closed 2015)

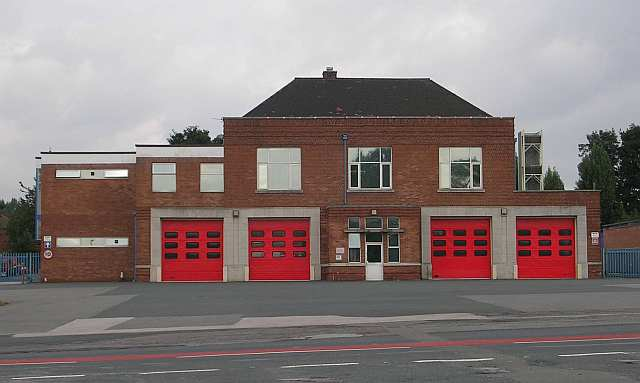
Gipton fire station (closed 2015)

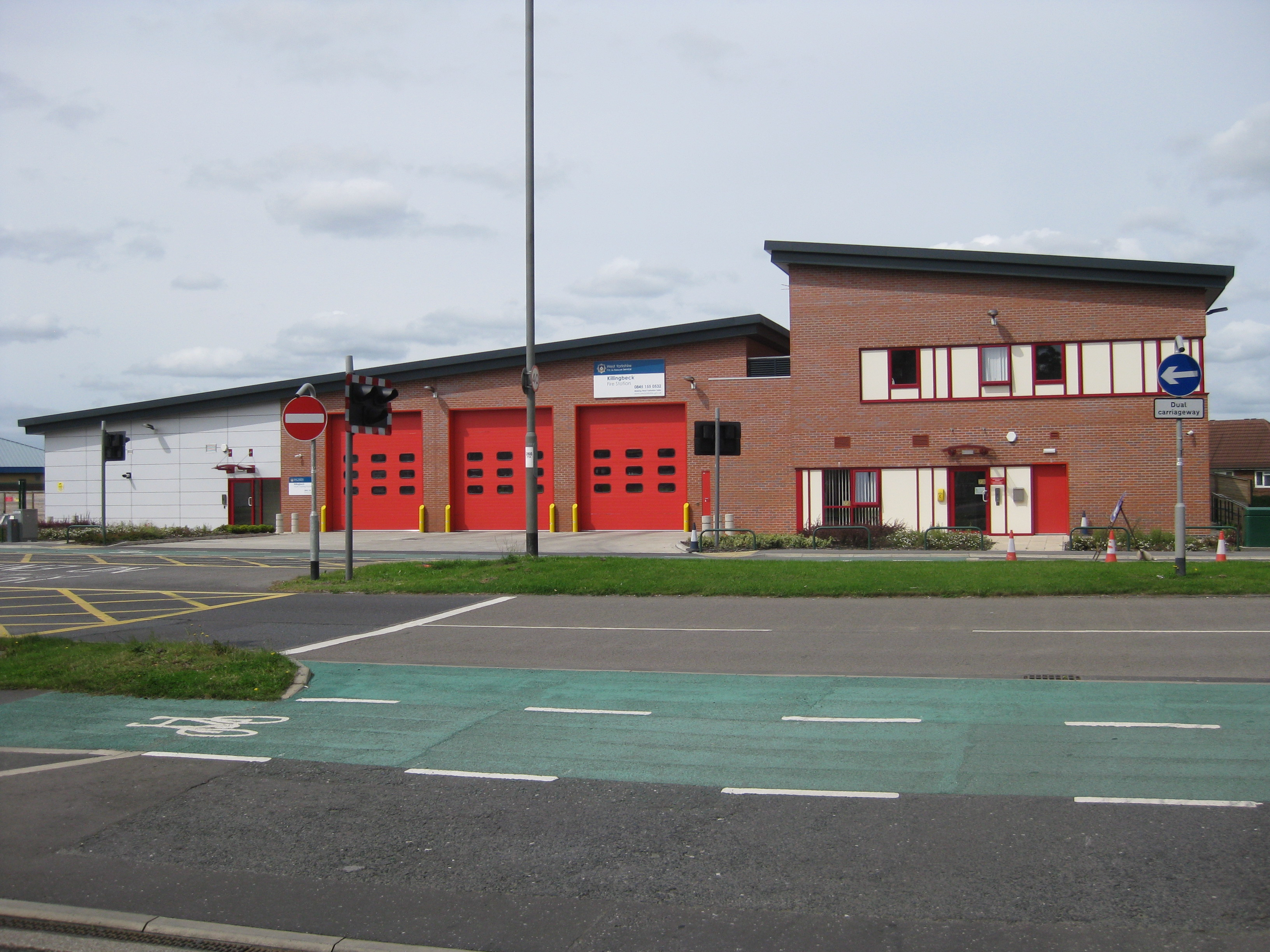
The new Killingbeck fire station pictured in 2017

== Notable incidents ==
- Bradford City stadium fire – 11 May 1985; a fire at valley Parade, the home of ground of Bradford City Football Club which killed 56 people.
- Allied Colloids plant in Low Moor – 21 July 1992; a large fire at the chemical plant involved over 150 firefighters and precipitated the closure of the adjacent M62 motorway.
- Hickson & Welsh plant, Castleford – 21 September 1992; more than 100 firefighters and 17 engines were required to tackle the fire.
- Speedibake Bakery, Wakefield – 1 February 2020; more than 20 pumps and two aerials with specialist vehicles across the county required to tackle a fire that broke out at the bakery causing significant closures nearby, at its height around 140 firefighters in attendance.
- Spring Mill Street tyre storage, Bradford – 16–23 November 2020; at its height, 90 firefighters and 15 appliances were involved at a major tyre fire on the site of a former go-karting facility in central Bradford, where over 600,000 tyres were stored. Twenty schools in the area were closed due to air pollution concerns, while train services to Bradford Interchange were suspended. The fire was declared out on 23 November, however some crews remained to tackle smouldering remains. The WYFRS response to the fire was featured in a July 2021 episode of BBC documentary Yorkshire Firefighters.

== See also ==
- Fire services in the United Kingdom
- List of British firefighters killed in the line of duty
