= Swarcliffe =

Area of the City of Leeds, West Yorkshire, England

Coordinates: 53.820°N 1.448°W

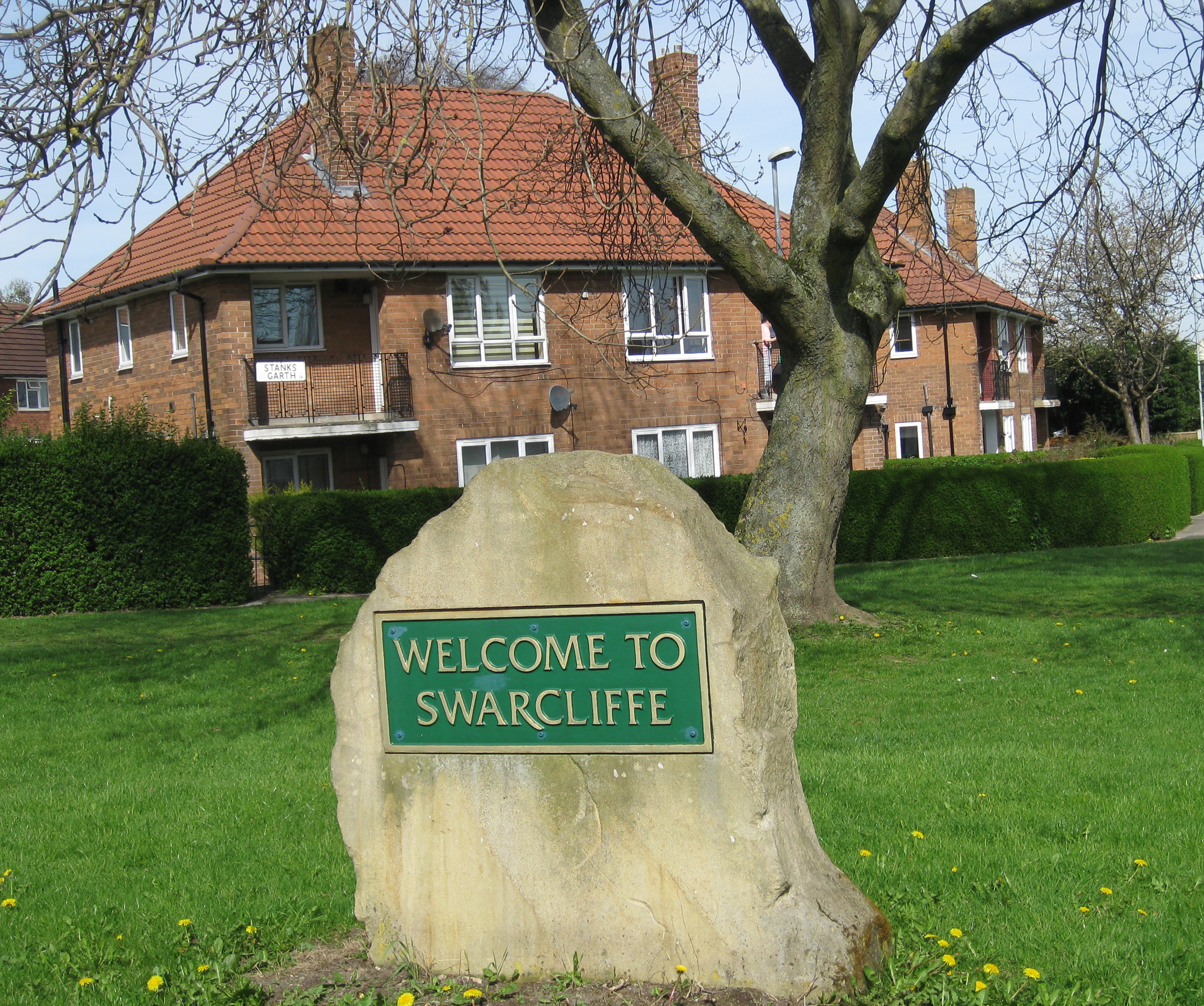
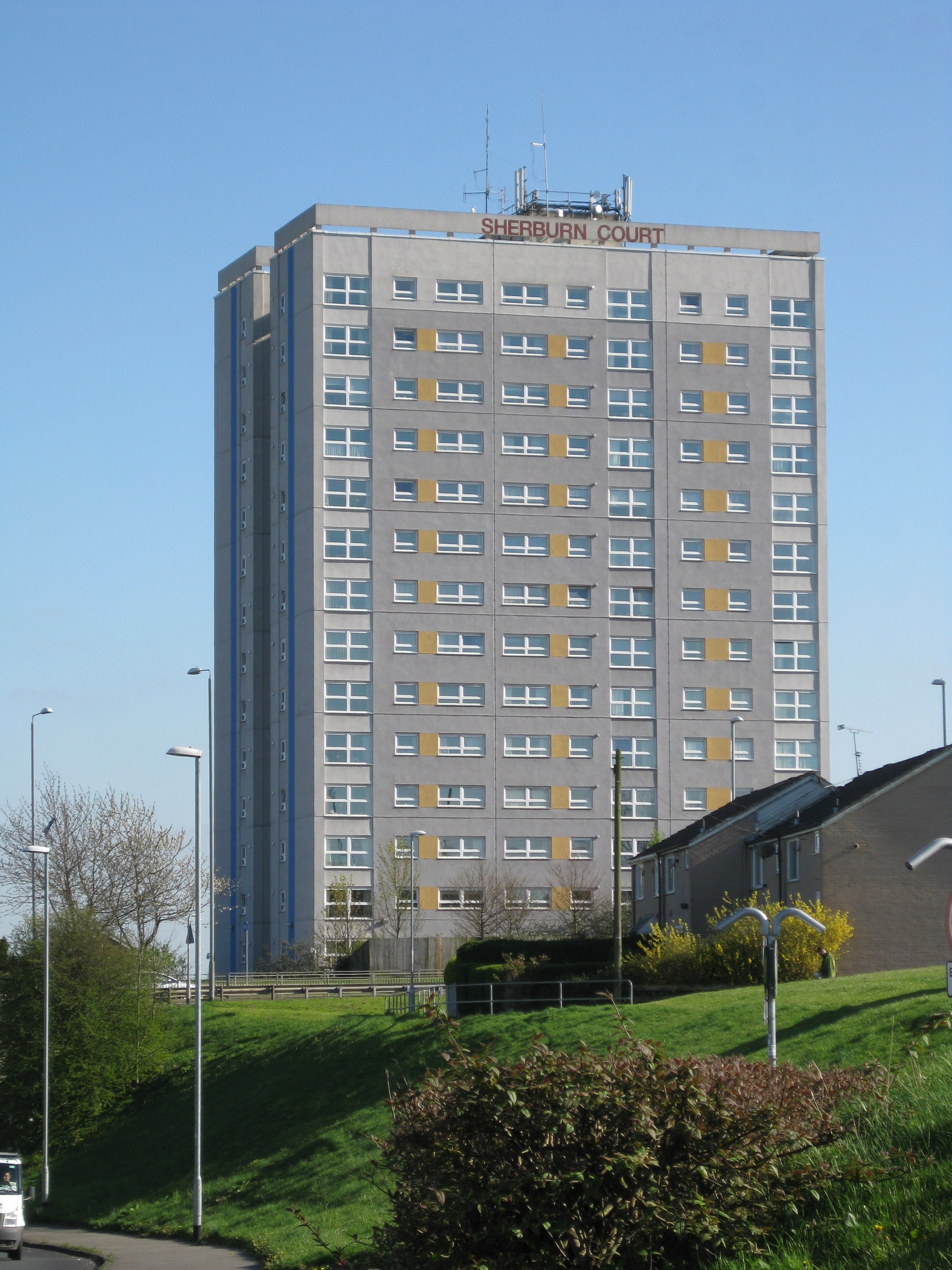
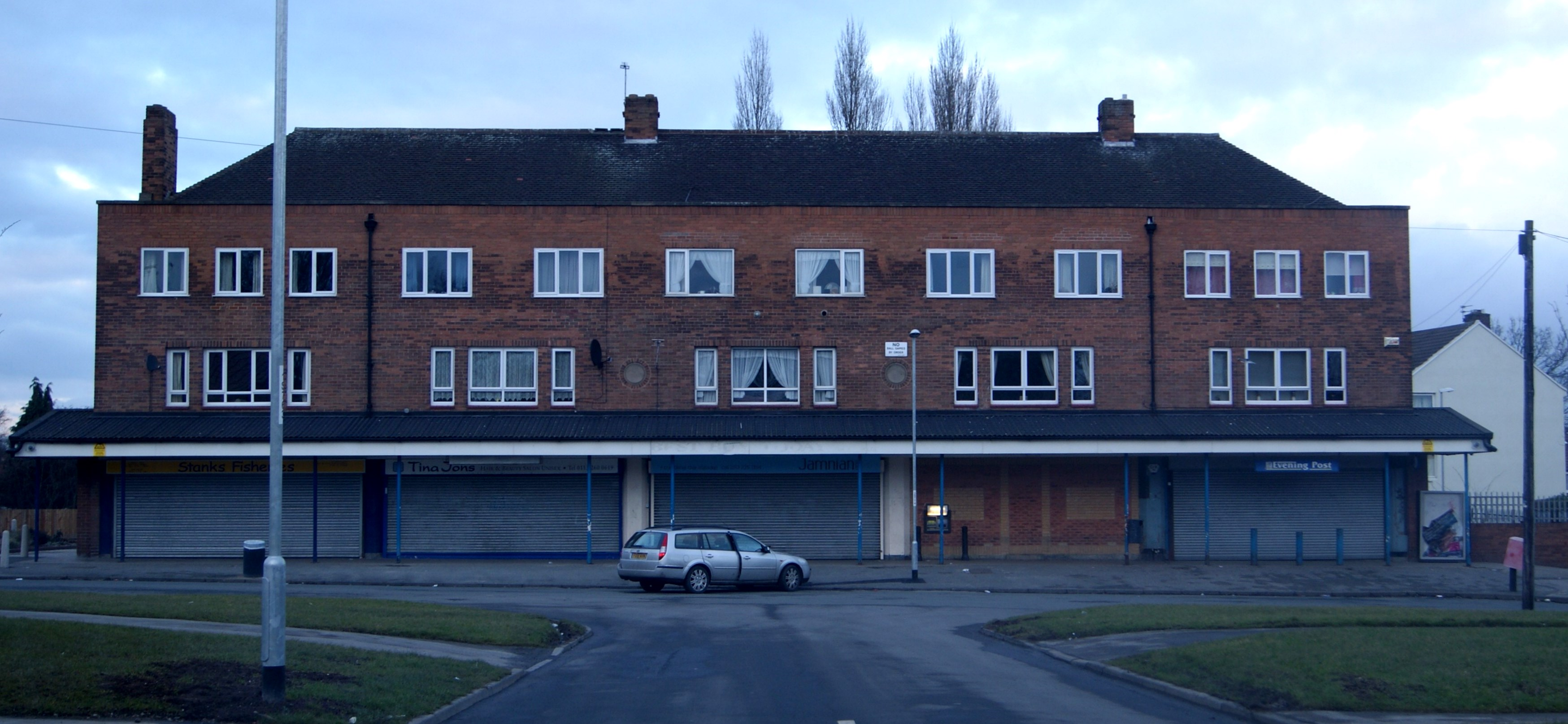
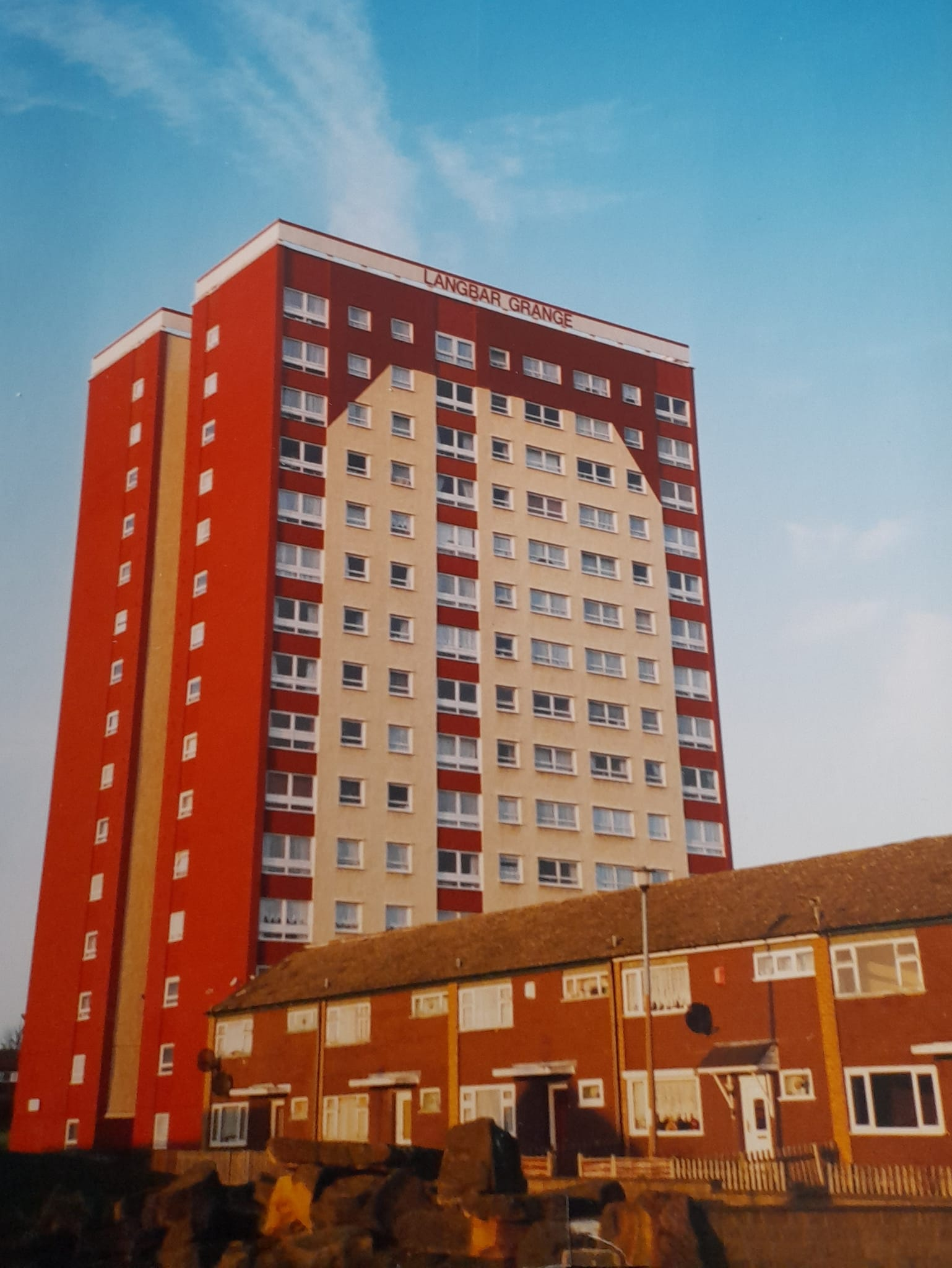
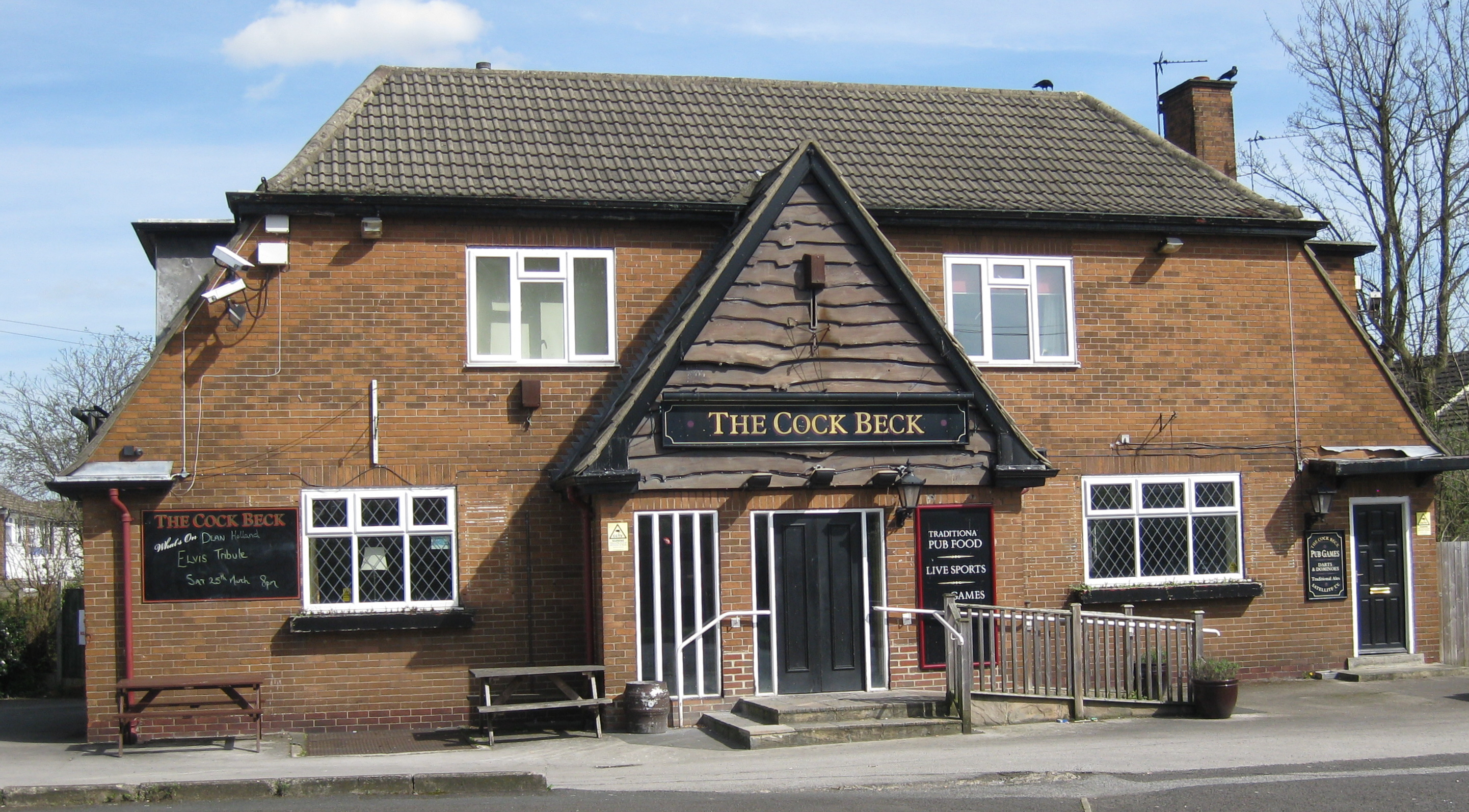
- Entrance Sign Sherburn Court Stanks Parade Langbar Grange The Cock Beck Inn

- Location within West Yorkshire
- Population: 6,751
- OS grid reference: SE36543620
- Metropolitan borough: City of Leeds
- Metropolitan county: West Yorkshire
- Region: Yorkshire and the Humber
- Country: England
- Sovereign state: United Kingdom
- Post town: Leeds
- Postcode district: LS14, LS15
- Dialling code: 0113
- Police: West Yorkshire
- Fire: West Yorkshire
- Ambulance: Yorkshire
- UK Parliament: Leeds East

Swarcliffe, originally the Swarcliffe Estate, is a district of Leeds, West Yorkshire, England. It is 4.9 miles (8 km) east of Leeds city centre, and within the LS14 and LS15 Leeds postcode area. The district falls within the Cross Gates and Whinmoor ward of the Leeds Metropolitan Council.

In the 1950s, the Swarcliffe housing estate was developed, by the County Borough of Leeds, including semi detached council houses, three-storey blocks containing flats, and three brick-built, nine-storey blocks of flats. Two of these were demolished in the 1990s, and the third in 2007. A private finance initiative redevelopment of Swarcliffe began in 2006.

From 1955 to 1992, the MP for Leeds East constituency, including Swarcliffe, was Denis Healey.

In 2009, over 91% of the population in Swarcliffe were "hard-pressed".

== History ==
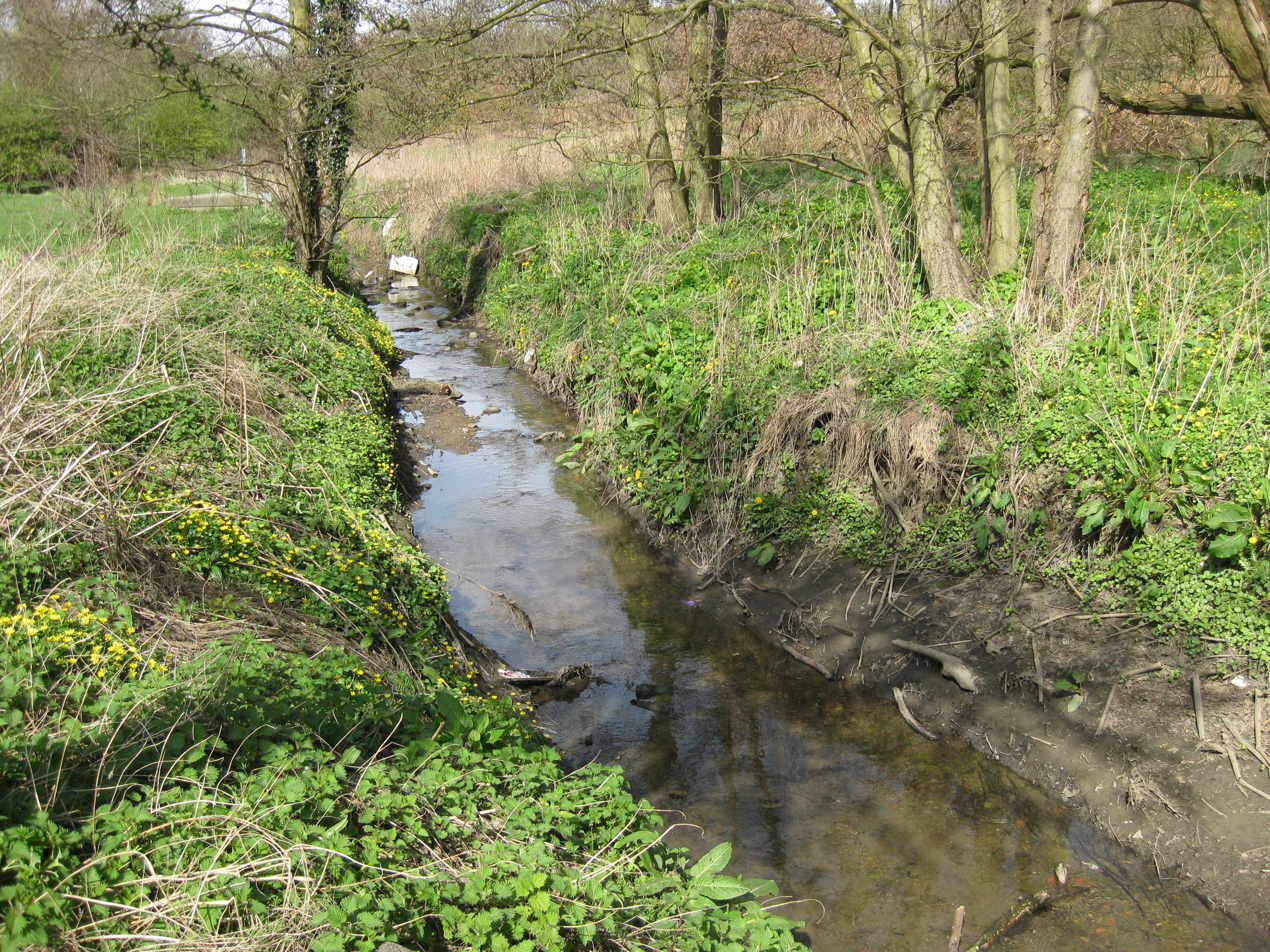
Cock Beck going north from Barwick Road

The Battle of the Winwaed, between the army of the Christian king Oswiu of Bernicia and the pagan army of King Penda of Mercia, took place in 655 AD, according to Bede, although some historians favour 654 or 656. The actual site of the battle is disputed, but one possibility is that the River Winwaed is now the Cock Beck, to the east of Swarcliffe. The battle is remembered in the names of Pendas Way, a street south of Swarcliffe, and the nearby Pendas Fields estate.

After the Norman Conquest in 1066, William the Conqueror granted the parish of Whitkirk, which included Seacroft, to Ilbert de Lacy of Pontefract, whose descendants held the title of Earl of Lincoln. The parish was subsequently leased by the de Lacys to the Somerville family. During the English Civil War in 1643, Lord Goring's Royalist army defeated the Parliamentarians under Sir Thomas Fairfax at the Battle of Seacroft Moor.

In the 1820s, Swarcliffe and Stanks were part of the Barwick-in-Elmet parish. The name "Stanks" derives from a French word meaning ponds or pools of putrid water. Before the Swarcliffe Estate was built, the area contained Winmore Lodge (renamed Winn Moor Lodge in 1893), Penwell House, Hill Top, Spikeland Nook, Swarcliffe Farm, (Note: In 1997, Alan Noble, the church warden of St James' Church, Seacroft, remembered moving to a tied cottage in Taylors Yard in 1926, when his father was employed by Mr. Presious; the owner of Swarcliffe Farm. From: Memories of Seacroft as a Village 1926 to 1947, a pamphlet by Alan Noble. Published by Seacroft St James' PCC. 1998) and a parochial school on Stanks Lane South/Barwick Road, which was replaced by Windsor Terrace before 1892.

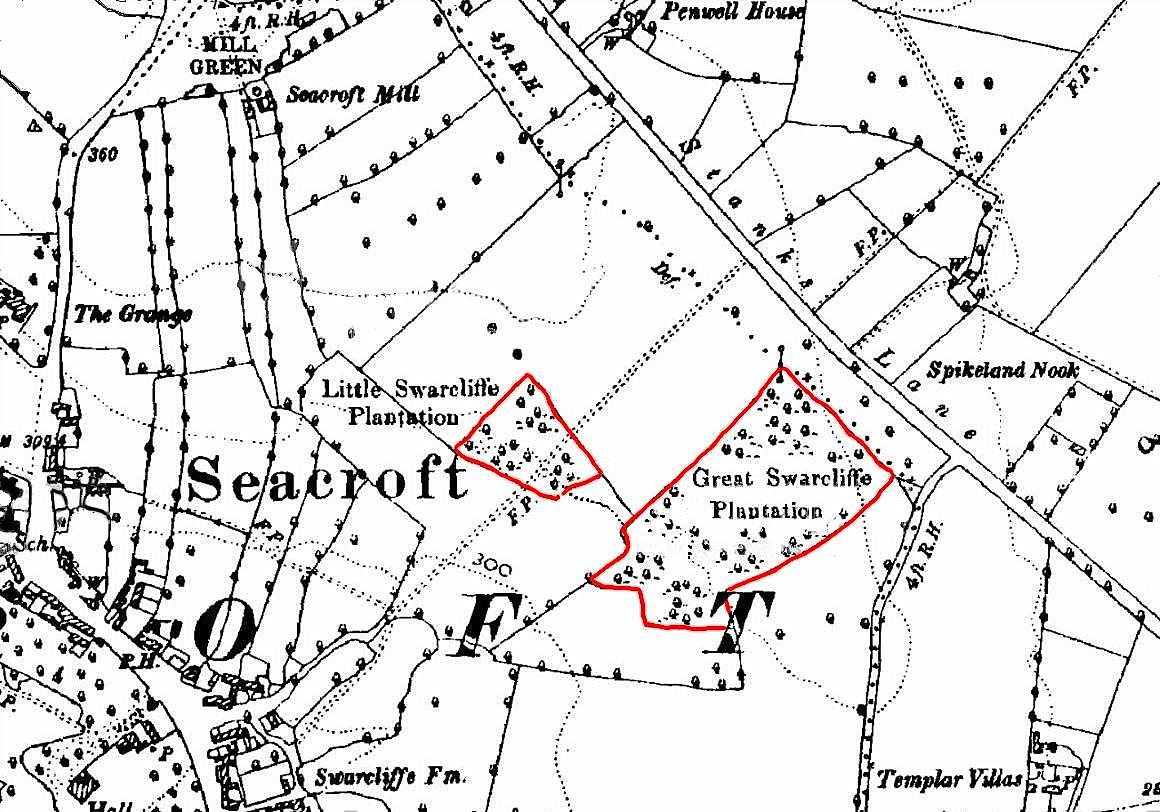
An 1893–1894 Ordnance Survey map of Seacroft, showing Swarcliffe's woods/plantations (marked in red)

The Leeds to Halton Dial road was turnpiked in 1751. Tolls were collected at the Penny Toll, a toll house on York Road, at the north-eastern border of the area. This road is the A64 Leeds to York road The toll house was owned by Sir Thomas Gascoigne, whose agents charged one penny per pair of wheels, which was "a considerable sum", according to the historian, Ralph Thoresby, who visited the area in 1702. In 1886, the property was owned by Colonel Frederick Trench-Gascoigne, of Parlington Hall, Aberford, who rented it out for three pounds, fourteen shillings and sixpence a year. Gascoigne owned and rented out a number of houses, coal mines, woodland and farm land in Seacroft, Whinmoor, Barnbow, Garforth, Barwick-in-Elmet, Cross Gates, and Scholes. The toll house was situated north of a cottage and a 19th-century granite-built windmill, which is now part of the Britannia Hotels Leeds hotel. In the mid-1800s, Isaac Chippindale, who lived at Windmill Farm, started the Scholes Brick and Tile Works on Wood Lane, on the border with Scholes. The company's quarry produced high-quality bricks, which were used to build many houses in the surrounding area. Its kilns and house were demolished in the early 1980s, leaving two small fishing lakes, but the site is still known as "Chippy's Quarry".

The Leeds to Wetherby Railway had a station at Scholes and passed under the turnpike to the northeast. The line was built by the North Eastern Railway and ran past the eastern border of Swarcliffe and Stanks. It opened on 1 May 1876 and closed in 1964. Services were withdrawn as part of the Beeching Axe, an informal name for the British Government's attempt to reduce the cost of running British Railways in the 1960s.

In 1874, the Ecclesiastical Commissioners published a report that noted that two new parishes would be delineated by "an imaginary line commencing at the point where the boundary dividing the said new parish of Seacroft from the new parish of Manston aforesaid crosses the footpath leading from Seacroft through Little Swarcliffe Plantation to Wood Laith Lane"—leading from the Cock Beck to Scholes; now called Wood Lane.

In 1812, the title Squire of Seacroft was held by the Wilson family, the last member of which was Squire Darcy Bruce Wilson. According to the 1891 census, he lived at Seacroft Hall with his sister, Louisa, and five servants - a footman, cook, kitchen maid and two housemaids. He was a Master of Arts, barrister at law, justice of the peace, and captain in the Yorkshire Hussars. After his death at Seacroft Hall in 1936, his nephew sold the family estate to Leeds Corporation one year later. The hall was demolished in 1953, and its ornamental lake was filled in to make way for Parklands Girls' High School. Templar Villas, a cluster of semidetached Victorian houses, was built on Templar Lane/Barwick Road before 1893, and a row of large houses was built on Templar Lane before 1908. Between 1938 and 1952, private houses were built on the north side of Barwick Road, between Stanks Lane South and the Cock Beck.

=== Development ===
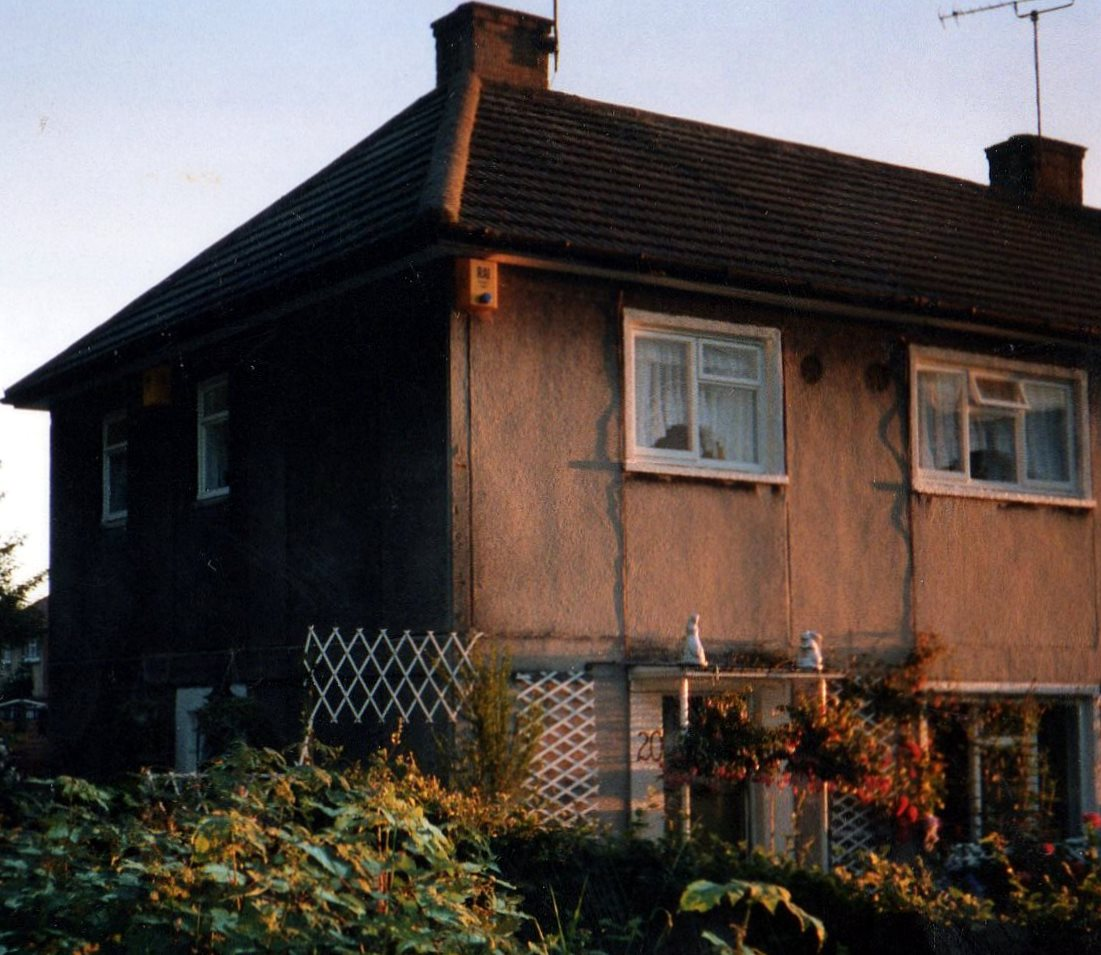
A three-bedroomed Swarcliffe house built with prefabricated panels in the 1950s, before refurbishment in the late 2000s

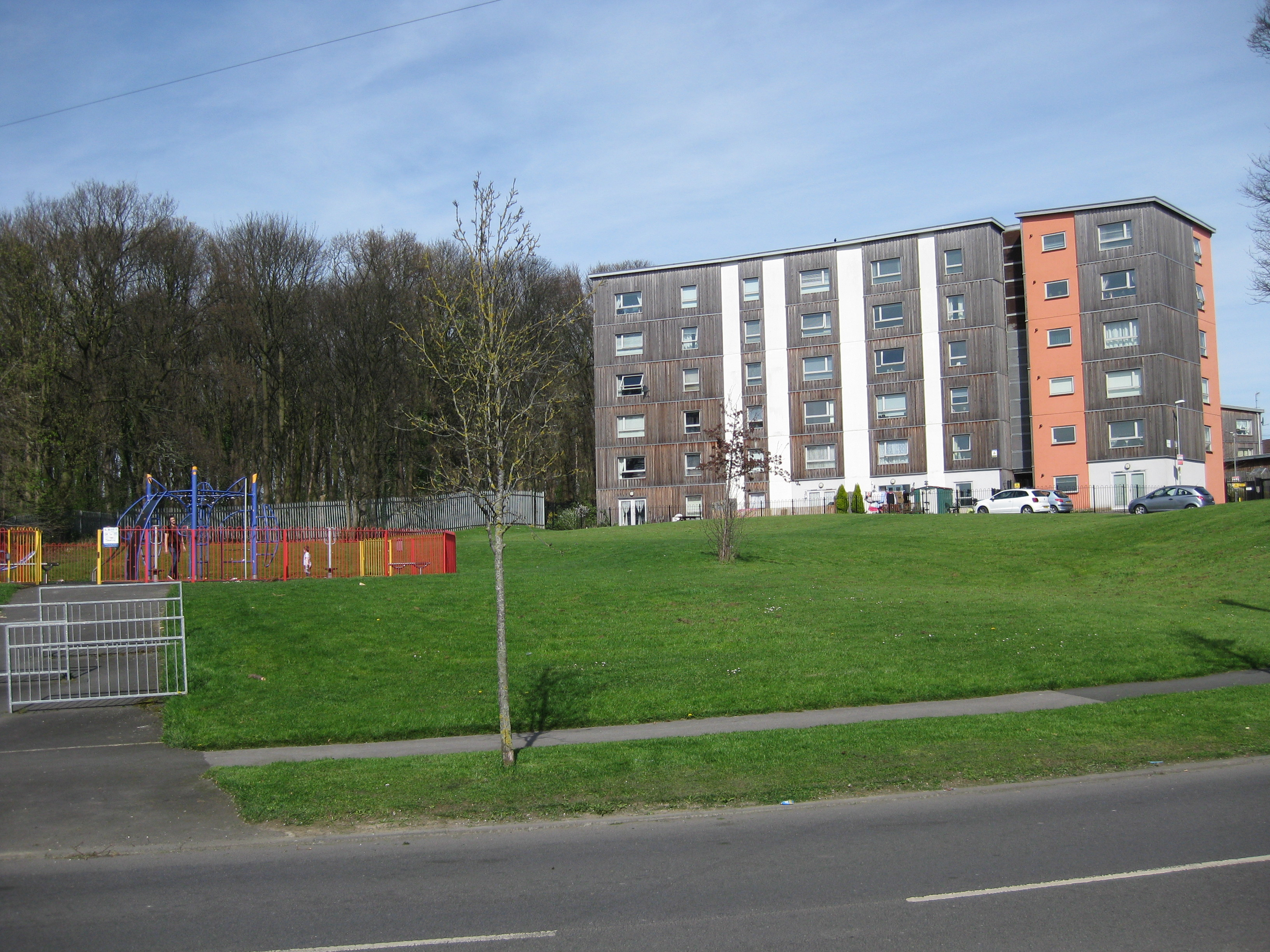
Modern flats in place of Elmet Towers: To the left is Great Swarcliffe Woods.

In a boundary change on 1 April 1937, Whinmoor was added to the Leeds County Borough from the Tadcaster Rural District. In 1953, The Civil Engineer reported that Myton Ltd, from Kingston upon Hull, were paid £227,232 "for the erection of 172 dwellings on the Swarcliffe (Seacroft) Estate". In 1955, The Civil Engineer reported a further payment of £2,867 for "Electrical installations in 130 dwellings at the Swarcliffe (Seacroft) estate". The estate was built between the Seacroft and Manston estates, bordered by the A6120 Leeds Outer Ring Road to the west, the A64 York Road to the north, and Barwick Road to the south, with Cock Beck and Scholes to the east. The adjacent Whinmoor estate was built in the 1960s, to the east and north. Swarcliffe measures 0.84 miles (1.35 km), from north-west to south-east, and 0.83 miles (1.34 km), from east to west. It is 4.9 miles (7.9 km), east of the Leeds city centre, and within the LS14 Leeds postcode area, which encompasses Swarcliffe, Seacroft, Whinmoor, Killingbeck, Scarcroft, and Thorner.

The housing estate consisted of two and three-bedroomed semi-detached houses, and a number of three-storey blocks containing 12 flats or more, but some have been demolished. Most houses were built of brick, but a number were constructed of prefabricated cinder and concrete panels.

The 1980 right to buy scheme enabled tenants to buy their homes and in 2008, the average price for a house in Swarcliffe was £109,810. In 2010, 1,025 homes were privately owned, and 1,394 rented.

The three brick ten-storey flats were built to a T-plan with access from balconies. Each block contained 60 dwellings. The Leeds Planning Committee approved the application in 1959 and the contract to build was won by W J Simms Sons & Cooke Ltd. In 1998, Swarcliffe Towers and Manston Towers were demolished. In 2007, Elmet Towers was also demolished. An old people's home, Woodview Court, was built on the site of Swarcliffe Towers and Manston Towers, and new housing was built on the Elmet Towers site. The West Yorkshire Archaeological Service believes that the Elmet Towers site may contain the remains of medieval pottery, which was once manufactured there.

=== Boundary change, demolitions and redevelopment ===
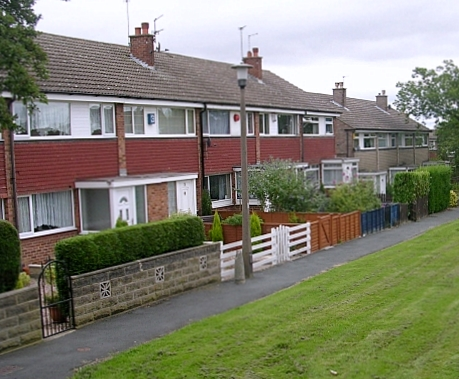
1960s, terraced, partly prefabricated housing in Whinmoor on the Swarcliffe estate

Since Swarcliffe estate was built in the 1950s, and Whinmoor estate in the 1960s, the southern part of Whinmoor is now within the Swarcliffe boundary. (Note: A small part of the Swarcliffe estate in the north-east is now within Seacroft) Houses built in the Whinmoor area were mostly prefabricated terraces, along with seven partly prefabricated high-rise blocks: 44 metres high, with fifteen floors. The Leeds Neighbourhood Index, provided by Leeds City Council, states that the new boundary contains 38 per cent terraced housing, 37 per cent semi-detached and 22 per cent purpose-built flats: 1,187 semi-detached homes, 873 terraced, 488 flats, 108 detached, 46 bungalows, and 28 maisonettes.

Langbar Towers, next to a shopping parade, was the first of five 15-storey H-plan tower blocks to be completed at Whinmoor. The high rise blocks had reinforced concrete frames with no-fines concrete infill panels. The planning application was approved in 1964 and the first block, Langbar Towers, completed on 24 January 1966 was officially opened on 19 February 1966 by Denis Healey. Ash Tree Court, Brayton Grange, Farndale Court, Langbar Grange, Langbar Towers and Pennwell Croft, six of seven high-rise blocks of flats built in 1966, were demolished in 2006. Sherburn Court, the remaining high-rise block, was refurbished and given a new roof, windows and lifts.

Yorkshire Transformations began a £100 million scheme to refurbish the area's housing began in 2006. This Private finance initiative is a partnership between Leeds City Council, Carillion and the Bank of Scotland. In the late 2000s, Persimmon Homes built St Gregory's, seventy-three private houses east of Stanks Drive.

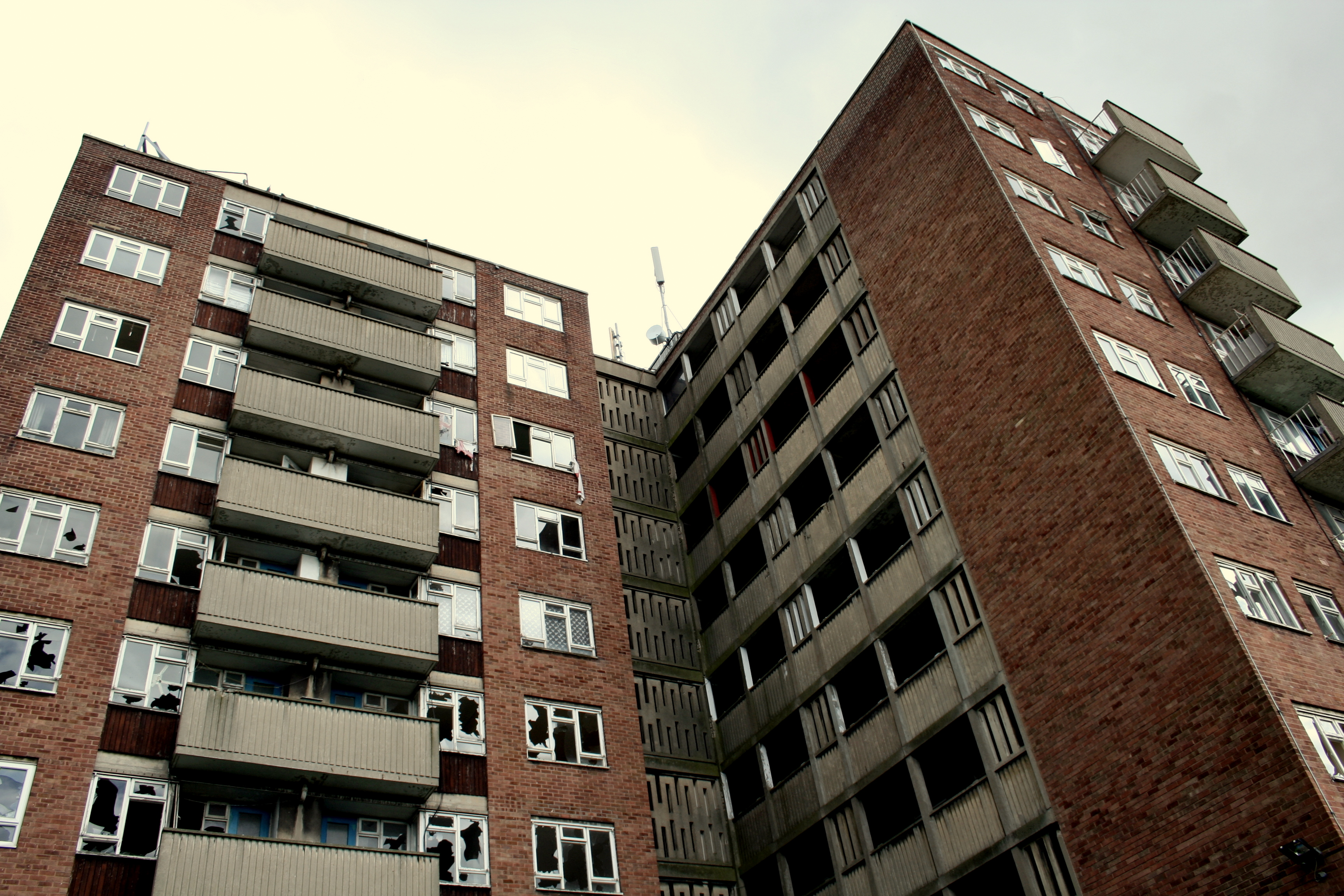
Elmet Towers in 2007, shortly before demolition

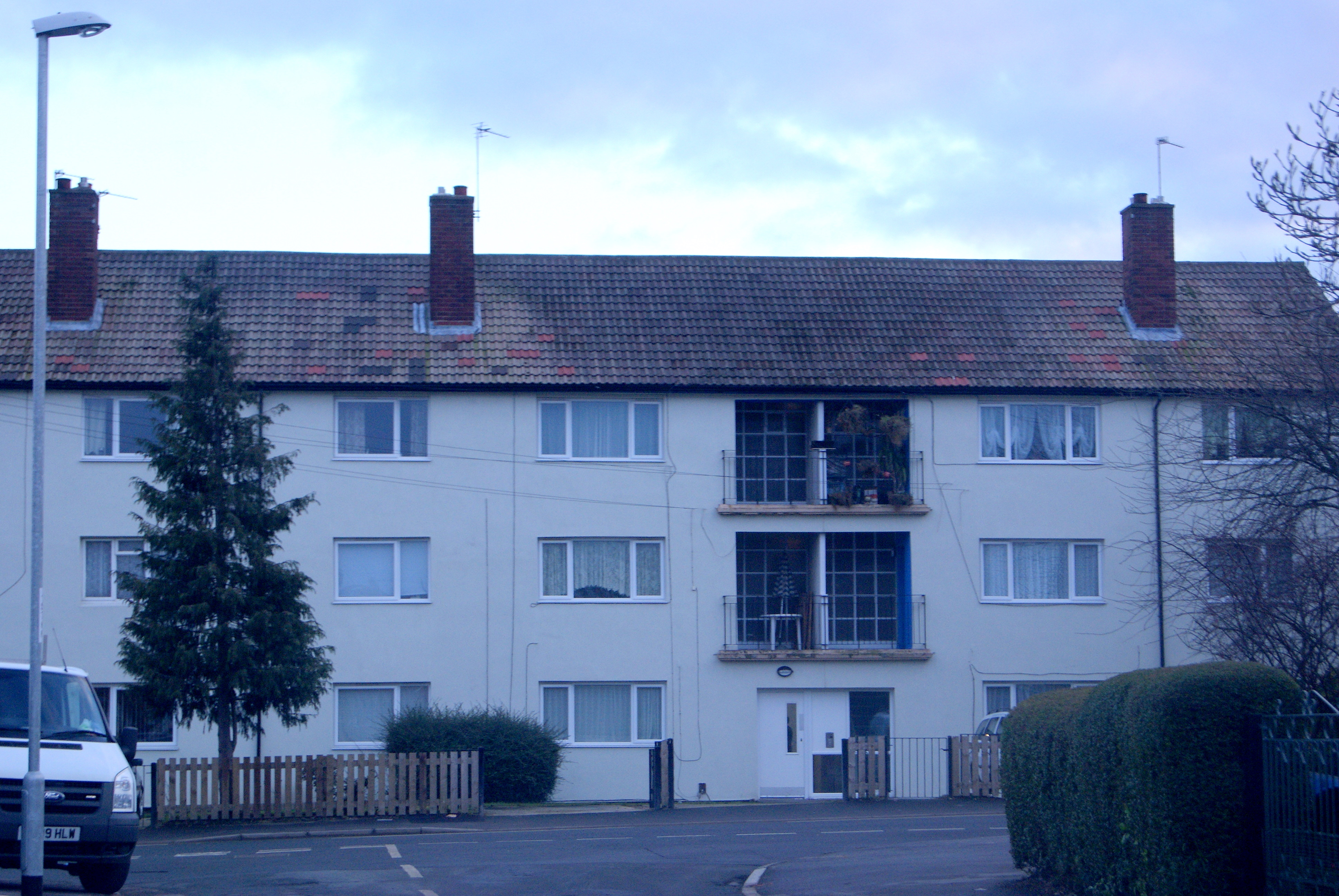
Three-storey flats on Stanks Drive

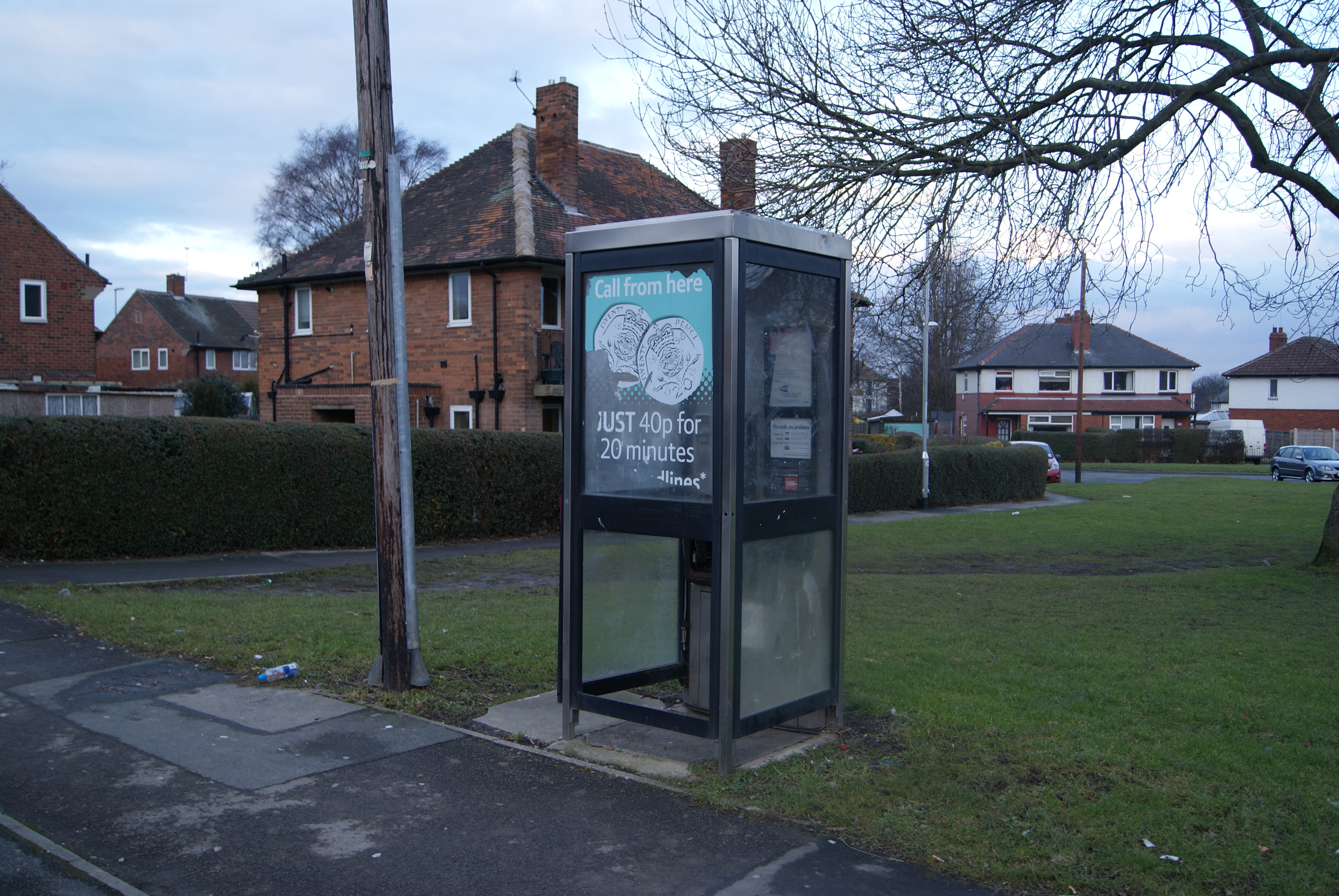
Stanks Lane South

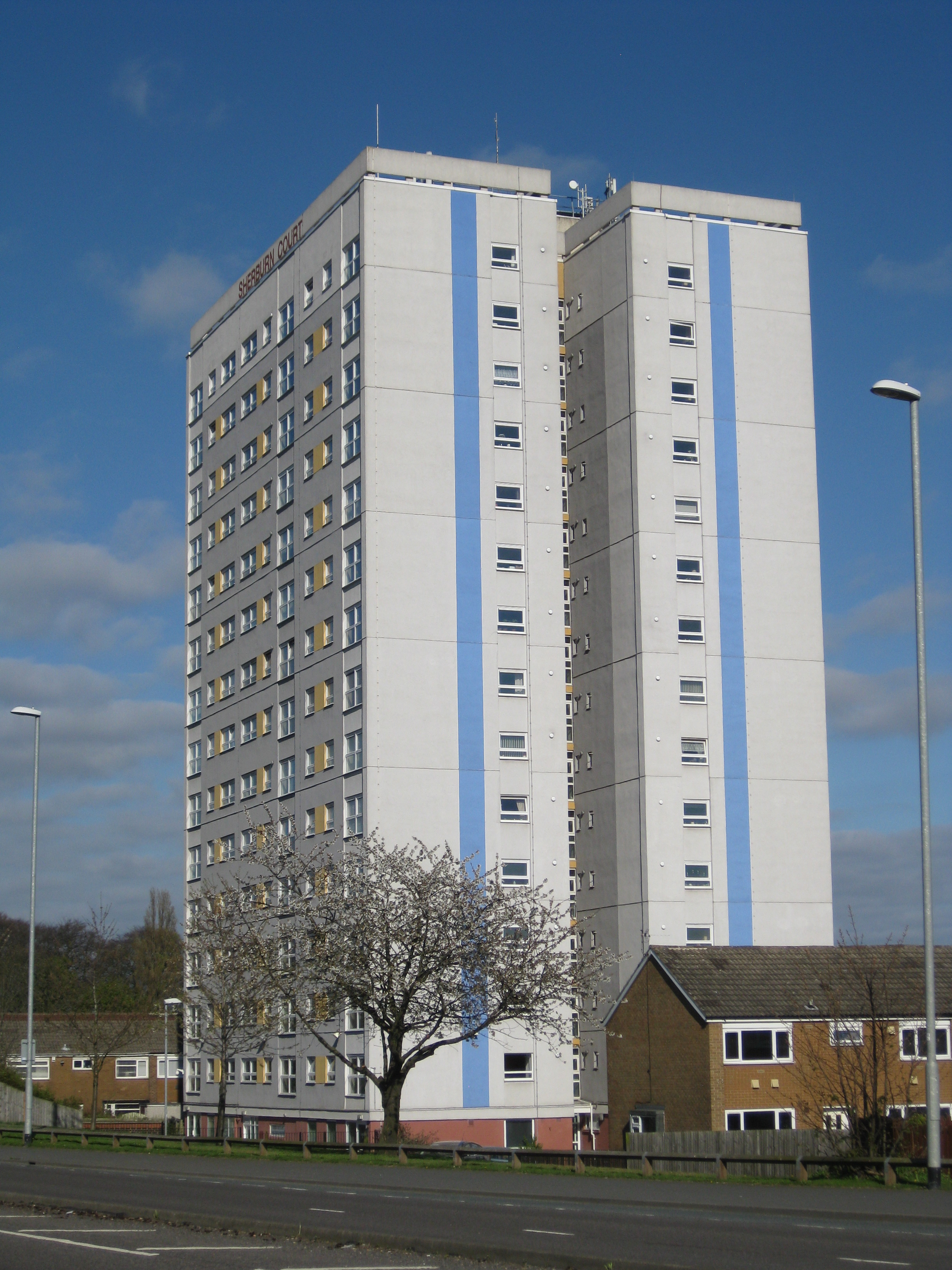
Sherburn Court, the last of seven fifteen-storey high-rise blocks built in the 1960s

== Governance ==
Swarcliffe is in the Cross Gates and Whinmoor ward of the City of Leeds.

Denis Healey was the Labour Party MP for Leeds East, including Swarcliffe, from 1955 to 1992, when he was succeeded by George Mudie.

== Geography ==
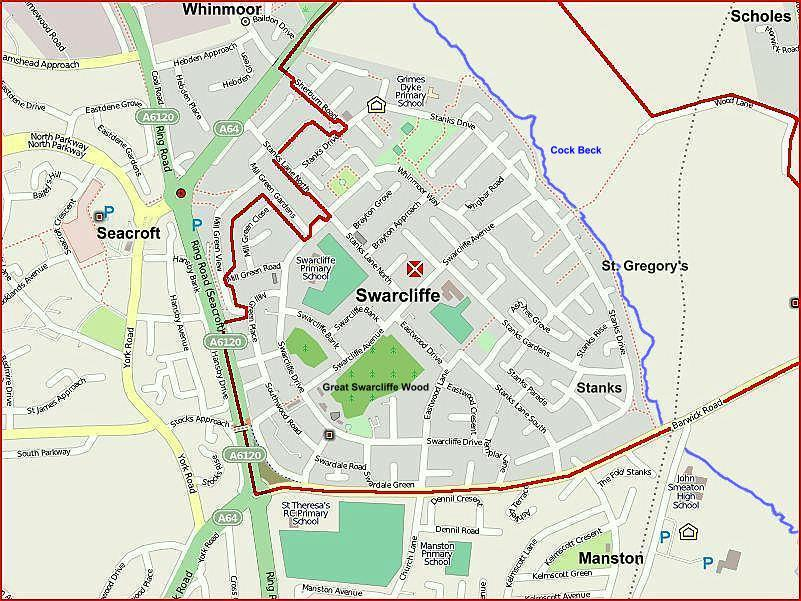
Boundary Map of Swarcliffe

The Swarcliffe housing estate is situated between the Seacroft, Whinmoor and Manston estates, and is bordered by the A64/York Road to the north, Barwick Road to the south, Cock Beck and Scholes to the east, and the A6120, Leeds Outer Ring Road to the west. The smaller Stanks estate is included in the Swarcliffe area. After the western part of the estate was built in the 1950s, Whinmoor estate was built to the east and north in the 1960s. After a boundary change, the southern part of Whinmoor (to the east of the original Swarcliffe estate) is now part of Swarcliffe.

The underlying rocks are coal measures towards the northern extremity of the Yorkshire coalfield containing shales, mudstones, sandstones and coal seams laid down in the Carboniferous period. The rock strata have a general dip towards the south and south-east.

Great Swarcliffe Wood, formerly Great Swarcliffe Plantation, which borders Swarcliffe Avenue, Eastwood Gardens, Swarcliffe Drive and Eastwood Drive, contains sycamore, oak and rowan trees, being approximately 260 yards (240 m) long, and 170 yards (160 m) wide. The Little Swarcliffe Wood, formerly Little Swarcliffe Plantation, borders Swarcliffe Drive, but can be accessed via Swarcliffe Bank. It has a collection of European trees, including sycamore, oak, ash, elm and lime. It is approximately 138 yards (126 m) long, and 97 yards (89 m) wide. Although the woods can be crossed along desire pathways, there are no official public rights of way. Fed by the Grimes Dike from the north of York Road, the Cock Beck runs in a southerly direction past Swarcliffe and Stanks' eastern borders, and joins the River Wharfe to the south of Tadcaster.

=== Climate ===
Although the climate in Swarcliffe is generally relatively moderate, in 2011 it was reported that extreme winds had damaged the roofs of several flats in the Lombardy House block on Southwood Close. Structural engineers were called to inspect the damage.

Climate data for Swarcliffe/Seacroft (2011)
| Month | Jan | Feb | Mar | Apr | May | Jun | Jul | Aug | Sep | Oct | Nov | Dec | Year |
|---|---|---|---|---|---|---|---|---|---|---|---|---|---|
| Mean daily maximum °C (°F) | 8 (46) | 9 (48) | 11 (52) | 13 (55) | 17 (63) | 19 (66) | 22 (72) | 22 (72) | 18 (64) | 14 (57) | 10 (50) | 7 (45) | 14 (58) |
| Mean daily minimum °C (°F) | 2.0 (35.6) | 3.0 (37.4) | 4.0 (39.2) | 5.0 (41.0) | 7.0 (44.6) | 10.0 (50.0) | 13.0 (55.4) | 13.0 (55.4) | 10.0 (50.0) | 7.0 (44.6) | 4.0 (39.2) | 2.0 (35.6) | 6.7 (44.0) |
| Average precipitation mm (inches) | 41 (1.6) | 46 (1.8) | 40 (1.6) | 55 (2.2) | 43 (1.7) | 61 (2.4) | 46 (1.8) | 44 (1.7) | 55 (2.2) | 65 (2.6) | 62 (2.4) | 69 (2.7) | 627 (24.7) |
Source: World Weather

== Demography ==
In 2009, the population of Swarcliffe was 6,751, of which 6,163 were considered to be "hard-pressed".

In the 2001 census Swarcliffe was recorded as having 4,819 Christians, 18 Sikhs, 17 Muslims, nine Buddhists, six Hindus and six Jews. The census recorded the ethnicity of the inhabitants: 6,303 White British, forty-seven Irish, thirty-two mixed race Black Caribbean and White, three mixed race Black African and White, thirteen mixed race Asian and White, twelve Indian, eleven Pakistani, three Black Caribbean, eleven Black African, and seven Chinese.

== Education ==
Swarcliffe School, on Swarcliffe Drive, was an infant (5 to 8-years-old) and junior school (8 to 11-years-old), but the junior section was demolished in the 2000s, and the school renamed Swarcliffe Primary School and Nursery. In the early 1960s, Oxfam made a colour film for its 21st anniversary about the pupils of Swarcliffe School, called Swarcliffe Junior School Presents Our Daily Bread, which featured pupils creating a stand for Leeds' Freedom From Hunger exhibition.

In September 1964, St. Gregory's Catholic Primary School opened on Stanks Gardens to accommodate the overflow of children from St Theresa's Primary School in Cross Gates, which is 0.9 miles (1 km), to the south. In 1989, the school moved to the former St. Kevin's Secondary modern school premises on Barwick Road. The school closed in 2008 and was demolished in late 2009. The old school became St Gregory's Youth & Adult Centre, offering adult education classes, older people's services, child care, a Youth Service, and the Swarcliffe Good Neighbours Scheme which was established in 1994. (Note: In 2010, 600 people signed a petition to prevent the closure of the centre.) Grimes Dyke Primary School was built in the late 1960s in the north eastern part of Swarcliffe. In a 2008 census, it was reported that 1,419 children lived in the Swarcliffe area.

Swarcliffe Children's Centre is a privately owned day nursery, on Langbar Road (behind The Staging Post public house), and the Tykes Pre-School Playgroup is situated in the St Gregory's Y & A Centre, Stank Gardens.

== Churches ==
St Luke's Church is in the parish of Seacroft and part of the Seacroft Team Ministry, a group of Anglican churches in Seacroft, Whinmoor and Swarcliffe. The parish is in the Diocese of Ripon and Leeds. Funds to build the church were provided by the Lilley family, who were connected with the Samuel Smith Old Brewery in Tadcaster. The church was designed by M. J. Farmer and built in 1963, with stone taken from Ripon Cathedral being used to support the altar. Swarcliffe Baptist Church, opposite Swarcliffe Primary School and Nursery, was used as a classroom when the school suffered from overcrowding. Stanks Methodist Church on Barwick Road was opened on 23 February 1869 by Primitive Methodists, but the building was closed and the congregation disbanded in 2007.

St Gregory's Catholic Church (Swarcliffe Drive, opposite Southwood Gate), formally called St Gregory the Great Church, is in the Catholic Diocese of Leeds. The land on which it stands was bought in 1954, but before building work started, Mass was held in the priest's council house, with confessions taken through the dining hatch of the kitchen. The first church on the site, a red brick hall opened on 11 October 1956, is now occupied by St Gregory's Social Club. On 12 March 1970, an octagonal church of modern design, by A. G. Pritchard Son & Partners, was opened next to the original church. It has simple bench seating for 335 worshippers, and stained glass windows designed by Jerzy Faczynski and a ceramic relief by Adam Kossowski. St Gregory's Social Club hosts meetings of the Swarcliffe and Stanks' Residents and Tenants' Association.

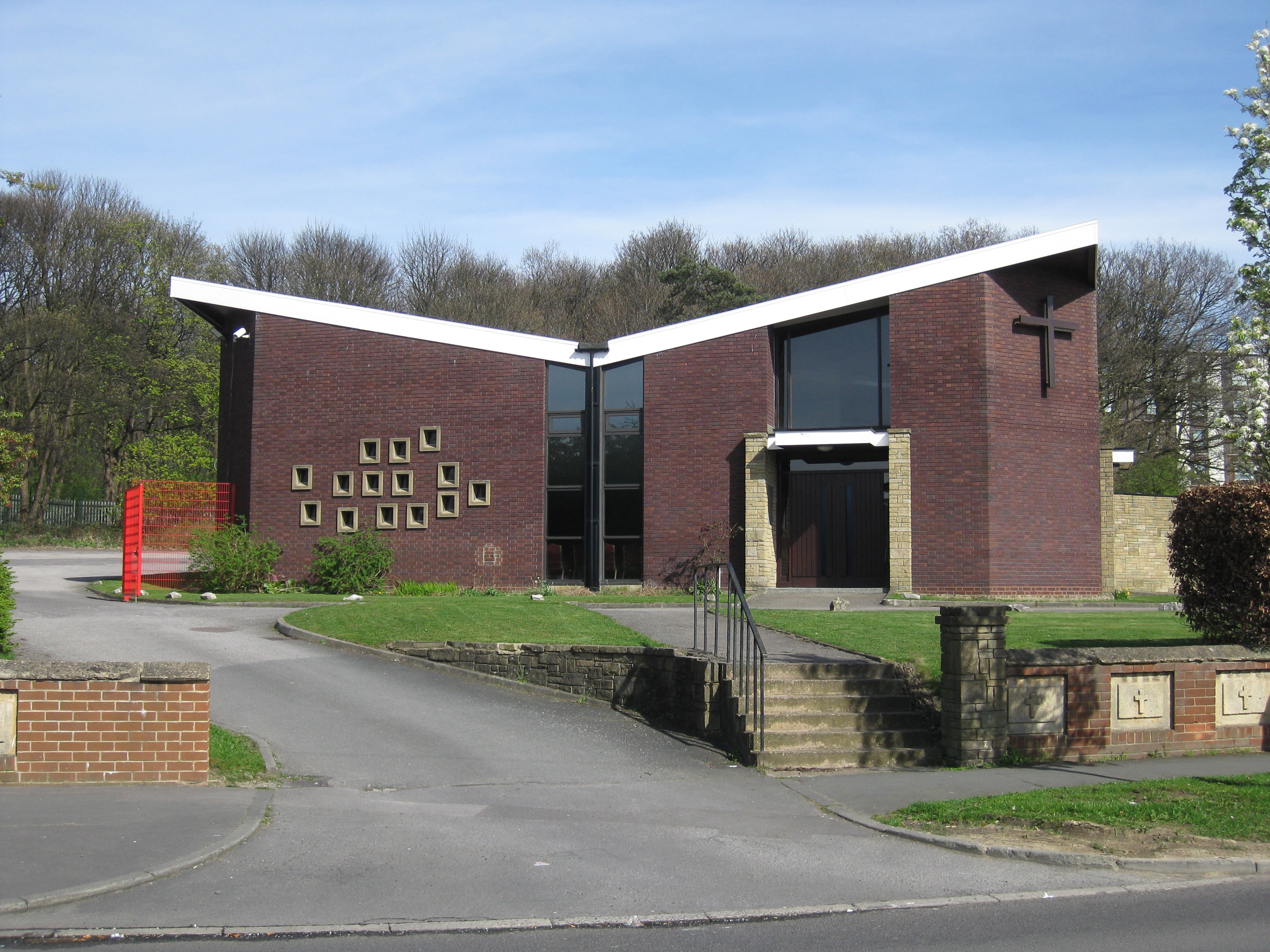
St Gregory's Church

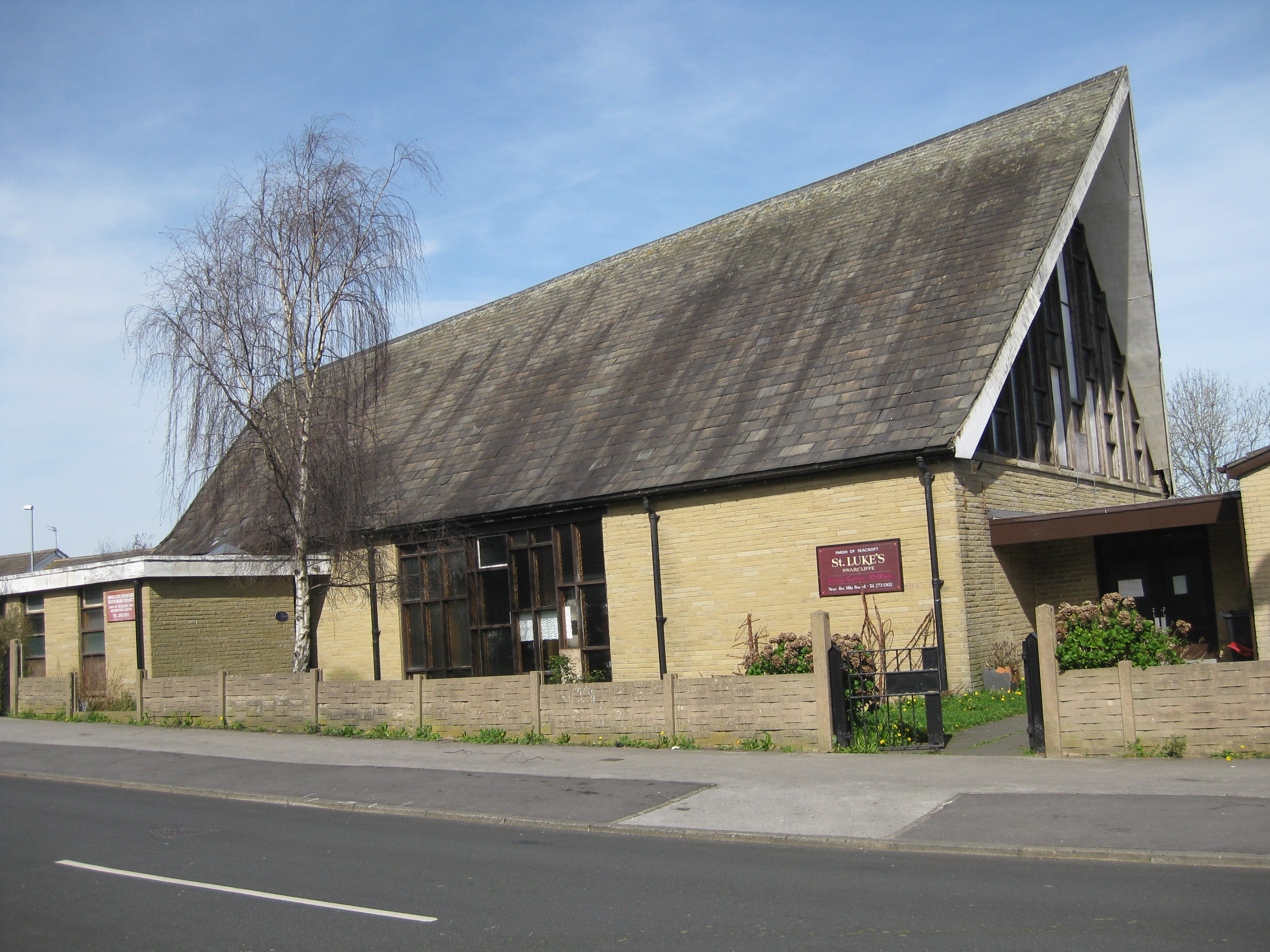
St Luke's Church (closed 2012)

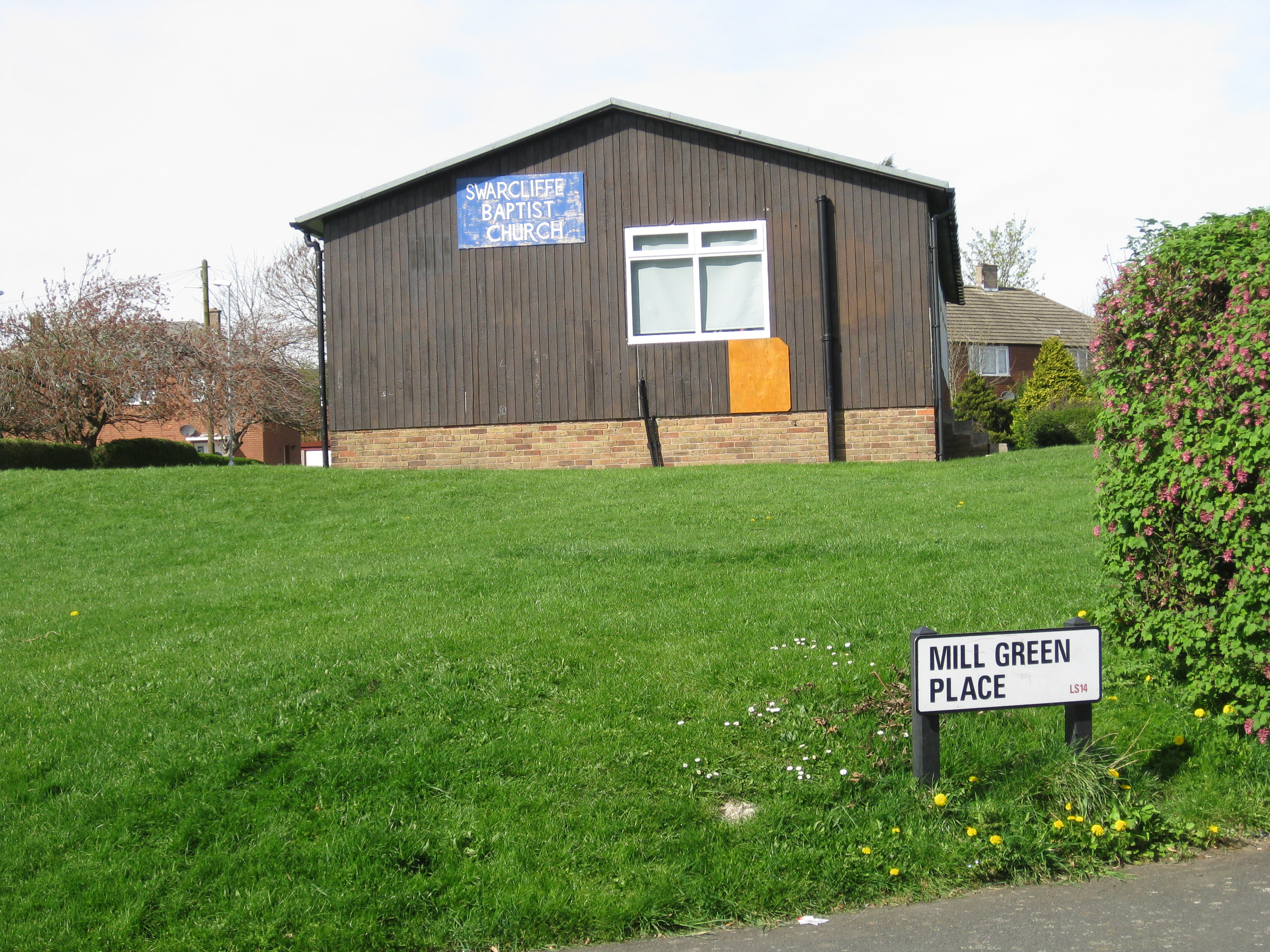
Swarcliffe Baptist Church

== Shops and public houses ==
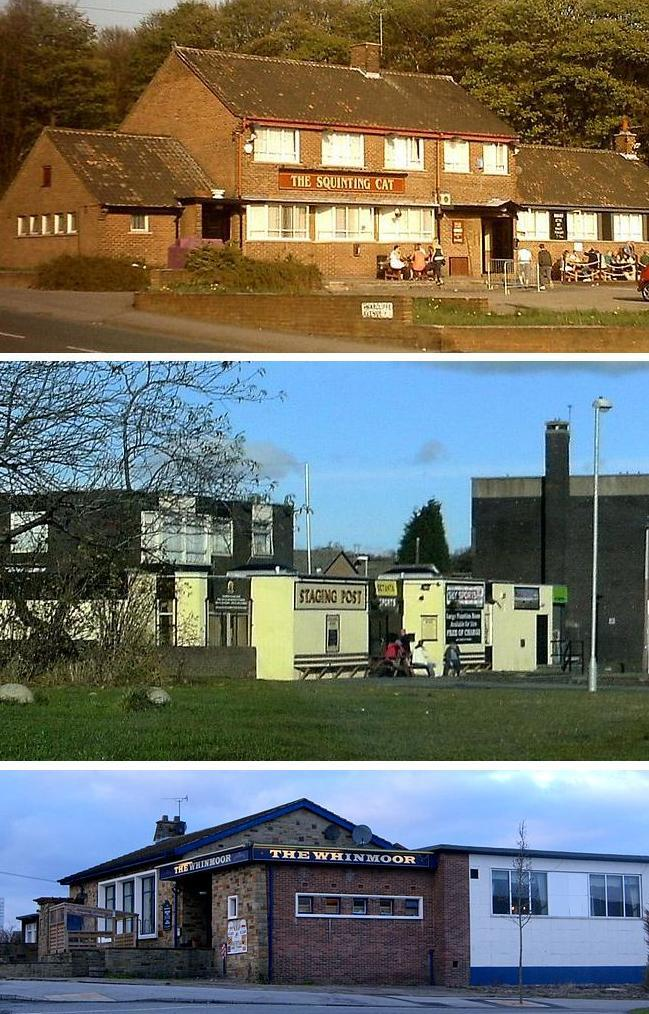
The Squinting Cat, Staging Post and The Whinmoor public houses

Unil 2002, when the north row was demolished, Swarcliffe Parade had two rows of shops. As of 2011, the remaining parade consists of a Chinese takeaway, a newsagent and off-licence, a minimarket, a bakery, and a betting shop. As of 2011, Stanks Parade has a newsagent, a fish-and-chip shop and a unisex hairdresser. A parade of shops and a post office on Langbar Gardens was closed in 2004.

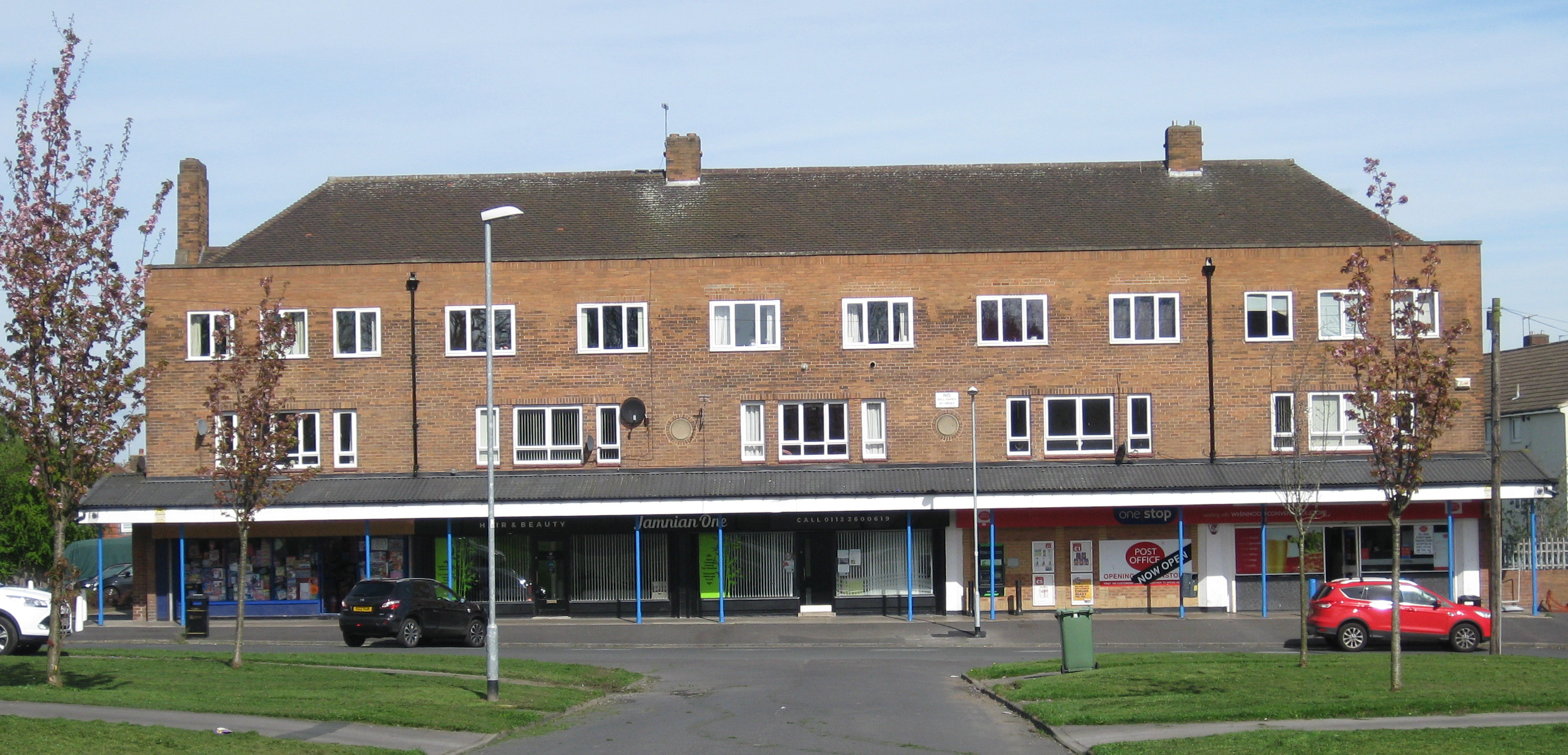
Stanks Parade shops

The Squinting Cat public house, once known as the John Smeaton after the 18th-century civil engineer from nearby Austhorpe. The Whinmoor public house was closed in December 2010, and re-opened three years (2012) later as a pub, but also offers self-defence classes for ages of all which is placed on the left hand side of the building. Swarcliffe Working Men's Club, a members only club, was built in the 1960s, in 2011 it had 1,700 members. St. Gregory's Social Club was next to St. Gregory's Roman Catholic Church and was closed in 2011. The Staging Post public house is on Swarcliffe Avenue/Whinmoor Way.

== Transport and infrastructure ==
The nearest rail station is Cross Gates station. Buses in Swarcliffe are provided by First Leeds. The nearest international airport is Leeds Bradford Airport, which is 12.4 miles (20 km) away.

Built in 1973, Stanks Fire Station on Sherburn Road is manned by 24 West Yorkshire Fire and Rescue Service firefighters.

Policing is provided by West Yorkshire Police, operating from Killingbeck police station.

There are currently no dentists' practices or doctors' surgeries in the Swarcliffe area, although the Windmill Health Centre is just outside the north-west boundary, on Mill Green View.

Leeds City Council provides all local authority services in the area. It decided to close Swarcliffe library in 2011 and replace it with a mobile service.

== Local Media ==
East Leeds FM was started in 2003, by students from John Smeaton Community College in neighbouring Manston.

== People ==
- Norman Harding (1929-2013), trade unionist, socialist and author

== Crime ==
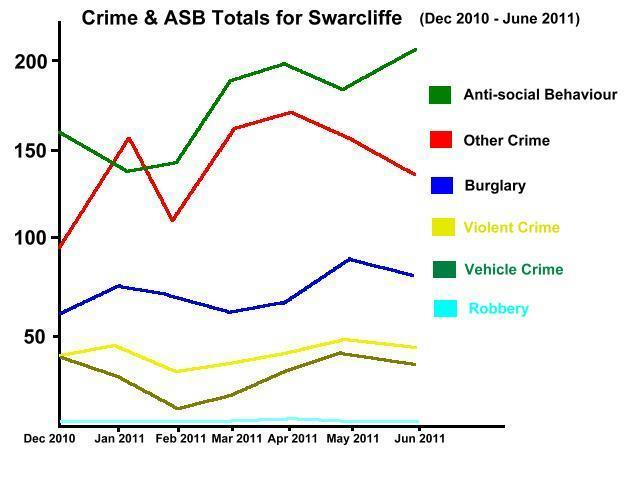
Crime rates in Swarcliffe from December 2010 to June 2011

In 2008, a Swarcliffe man posted more than eighty videos of his anti-social behaviour on YouTube, including high-speed road races, verbal abuse, trespassing, apparent theft and also illegal use of class A drugs. He was described as "Leeds' dumbest criminal".

In 2010, a Swarcliffe smuggler was jailed for avoiding £1.5 million duty on cigarettes hidden in shipments of plastic bags and storage shelves.

In 2011, a Swarcliffe drug dealer was jailed for bribing others to confess to her own crimes.

== Bibliography ==
- The Municipal Journal, Volume 70, Issues 3594–3606. Great Britain, Ministry of Housing and Local Government. 1962.
- Smith, Albert Hugh (1961). The Place-names of the West Riding of Yorkshire: Lower & Upper Strafforth and Staincross wapentakes. The University Press.
