= Cock Beck =

Stream in West Yorkshire, England

Cock Beck River Cock
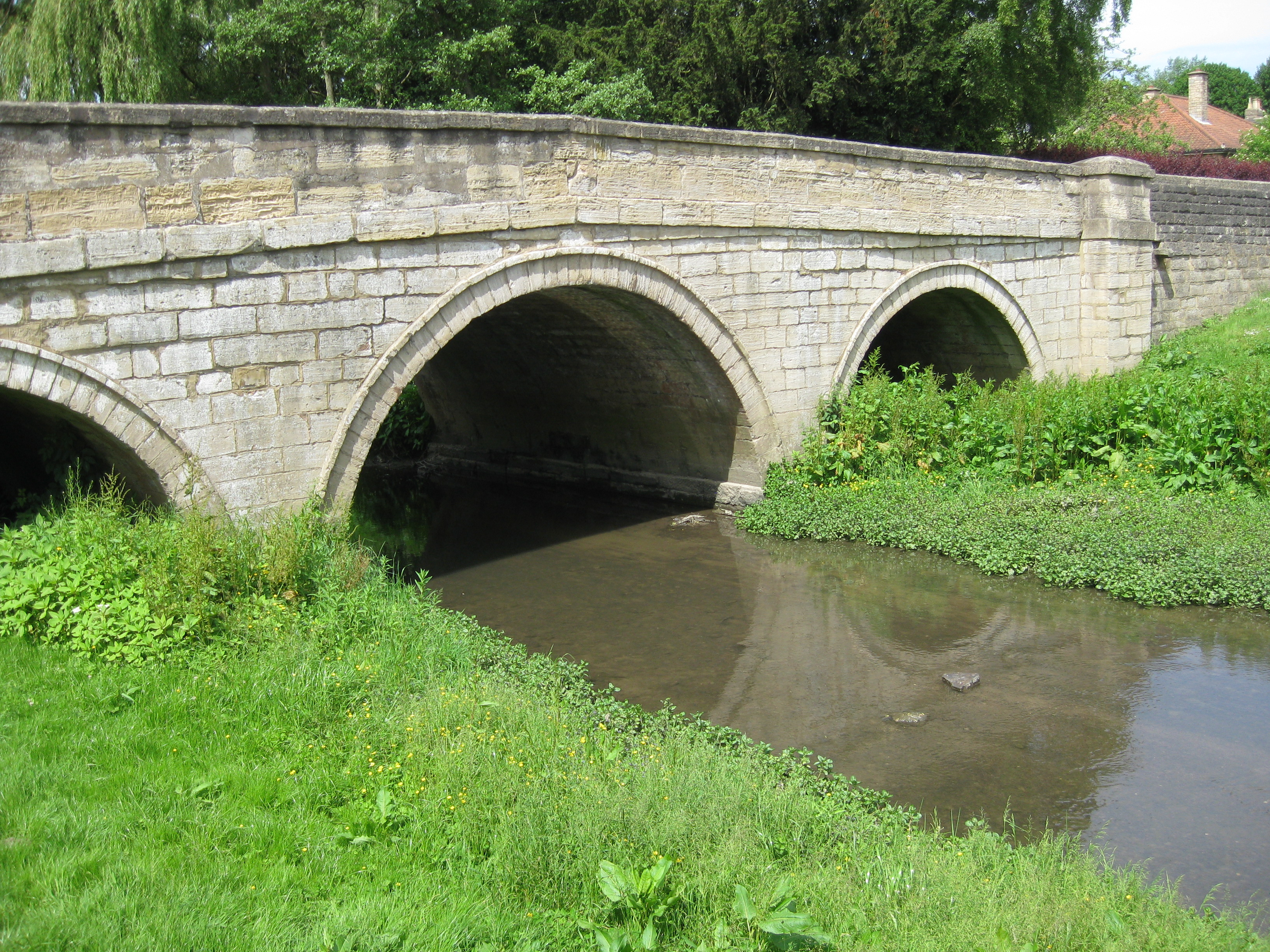
- Bridge over the Cock Beck, Aberford

- Position of river mouth

Physical characteristics
- Source
  - coordinates: 53.834°N 1.450°W
- Mouth
  - coordinates: 53.874°N 1.252°W
- Length: 25 miles (41 km)
- Basin size: 27 square miles (71 km^{2})

Basin features
- EA waterbody ID: GB104027063940

Cock Beck is a stream in the outlying areas of eastern Leeds, West Yorkshire, England, which runs from its source due to a runoff north-west of Whinmoor, skirting east of Swarcliffe and Manston (where a public house has been named 'The Cock Beck'), past Pendas Fields, Scholes, Barwick-in-Elmet, Aberford, Towton, Stutton, and Tadcaster, where it flows into the River Wharfe.

It is a tributary of the River Wharfe, formerly known as the River Cock or Cock River, having a much larger flow in the past than it does today. The name 'cock' may refer to a mature salmon, as it was a spawning ground for salmon and trout. Industrial pollution reduced the fish stock, but it has been recovering in the 21st century, aided by work from the Environment Agency. In places the beck was relatively narrow, but too deep to cross unaided; a feature which can still be seen today at many points.

== History ==
The Great North Road crossing at Aberford was first a Celtic trackway and later a Roman road. It is defended on the north side by 4.5 miles of Iron Age fortifications known as the Aberford Dykes which run from a hill fort at Barwick-in-Elmet, through Aberford and a mile east, consisting of a ditch and ridge. It is believed that this was a defensive construction of the Brigantes against southern tribes and the Romans. The river may have been engineered to increase the barrier.

Cock Beck is identified as a likely site of the Battle of the Winwaed on 15 November 655, a decisive victory of Oswiu of Bernicia over King Penda of Mercia.

The beck is thought to be the one after which Becca Hall, whose name is first attested, as Becca, in 1189, is named.

In the aftermath of the 1461 Battle of Towton remnants of the Lancastrian forces fleeing the victorious Yorkists were forced to try to cross the Cock Beck, having already disposed of most of their arms. Many drowned in the Beck, and soon the survivors were reported to be crossing the Cock Beck on bridges of their fallen comrades. The Cock Beck is now the limit of the heritage protected battlefield site in the Saxton and Towton areas.

During the English Civil War, the Royalists defeated the Parliamentarians under Sir Thomas Fairfax at the Battle of Seacroft Moor in 1643. The ensuing massacre of the Parliamentarians is said to have been of such magnitude that the beck ran crimson with blood.

John Ogilby's 1675 map indicates the major crossing for the Cock was sited along the Tadcaster-Ferrybridge road, however this crossing has no bridge and the steep descent and ascent on either side led to it being abandoned for a new cut, which crosses the Cock Beck further east near its mouth with the River Wharfe.

== Hydrology ==
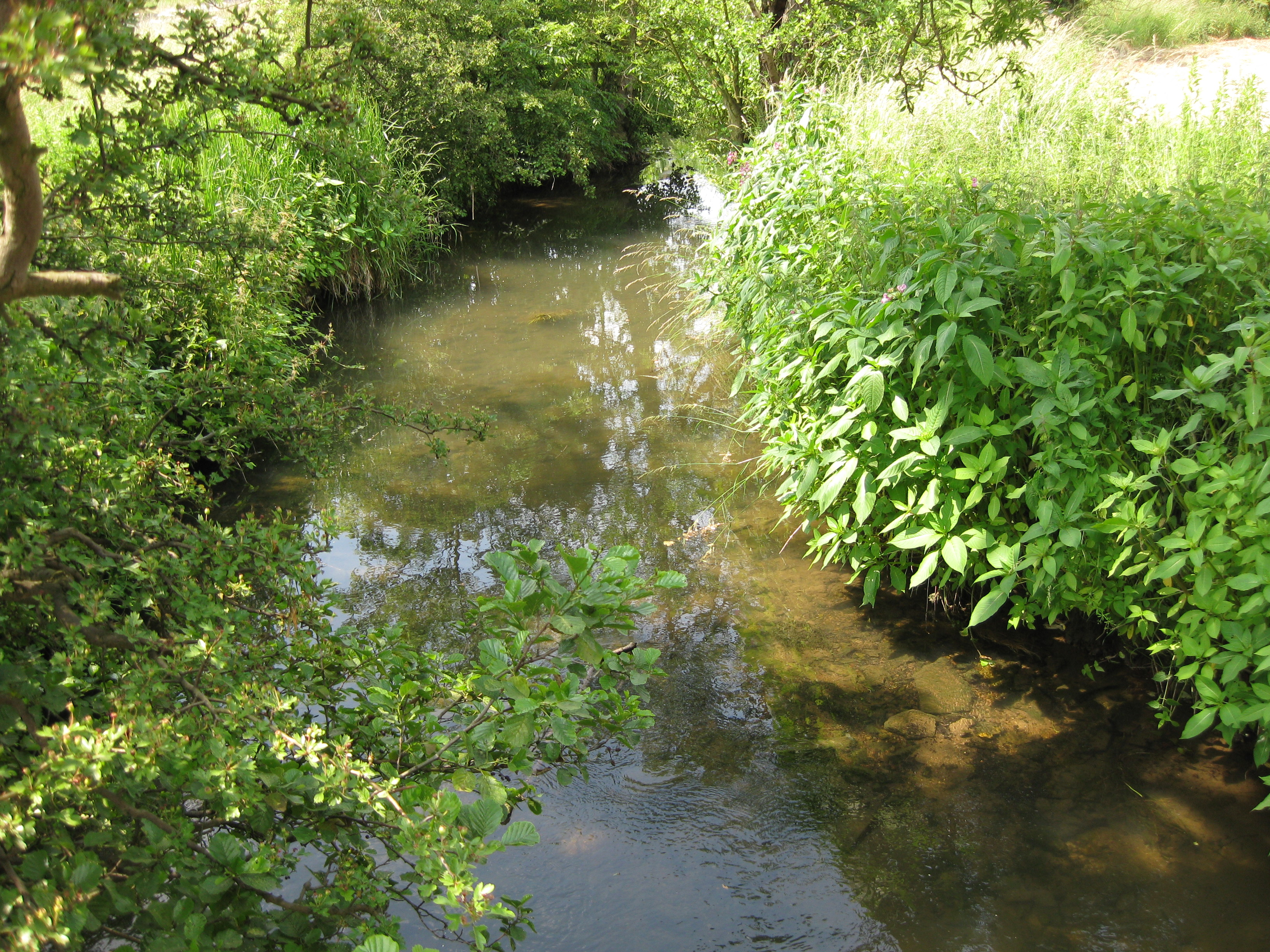
Cock Beck from the bridge at Towton

The beck flows from west to east across West and North Yorkshire for 25 miles (41 km), draining an area of 71 square kilometres (27 sq mi). It is one of the major tributaries of the River Wharfe, and is one of the last major watercourses to enter the Wharfe before it itself enters the Ouse. The Cock Beck Sluices control the flow of water upstream from the Wharfe into Cock Beck when the Wharfe is in flood. When the water reaches a flooding mark or more than 28 feet (8.4 m), then the beck backflows upstream to Stutton.
