= Pendas Fields =

Coordinates: 53.811°N 1.430°W

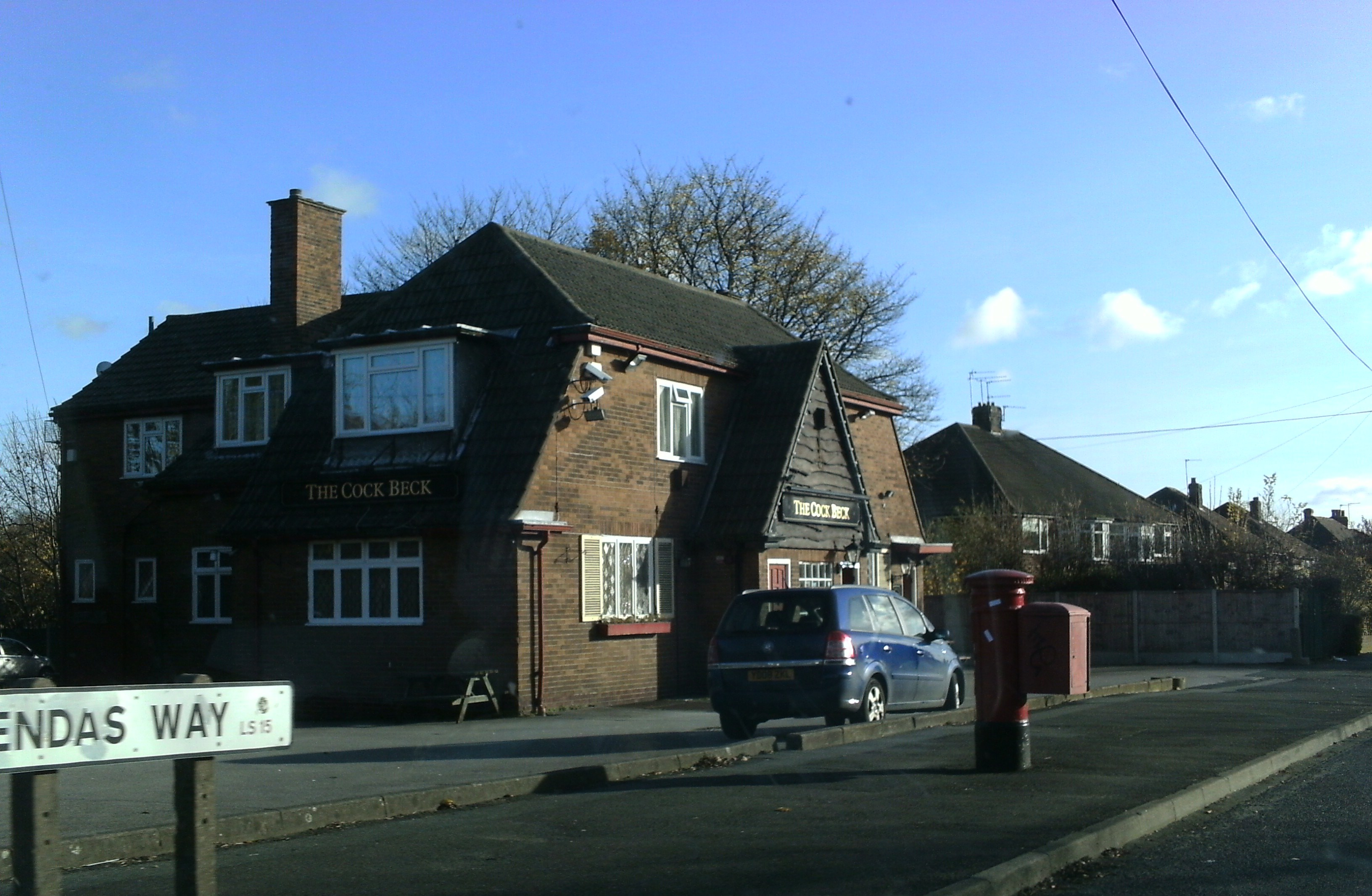
The Cock Beck public house

Pendas Fields, or Penda's Fields is a private, suburban housing estate in Leeds, West Yorkshire, England. It is considered part of Cross Gates, as is Manston. Swarcliffe is close, and Cock Beck runs nearby. The area falls within the Cross Gates and Whinmoor wards of the Leeds Metropolitan Council.

Pendas Fields and Barnbow Wood are associated with the Battle of the Winwaed in 655 AD (with "Pendas Fields" named for Penda of Mercia, the king who died at the battle).

It has its own sports centre and secondary school – John Smeaton Academy, named after 18th-century civil engineer John Smeaton.

Penda's Way railway station (opened in 1939) on the Cross Gates to Wetherby Line was in the area but closed in 1964 before the Pendas Fields estate was built in the 1980s.
