= Norman Harding =

English trade unionist (1929–2013)

- Born: 25 June 1929; Leeds
- Died: 9 December 2013 (aged 84); Leeds
- Education: York Road School, Cross Gates School
- Spouse: Pauline Harding
- Relatives: Herbert Johnstone Benjamin Harding, and Emma Harding (née King) Keith Harding (younger brother)
- Writing career
- Notable work: Staying Red: Why I Remain a Socialist

Norman Harding (25 June 1929 – 9 December 2013) was an English trade unionist and tenants' leader who worked for the Workers Revolutionary Party whilst living in London. He published the book, Staying Red: Why I Remain a Socialist, in 2005, which detailed his political activities from 1954 to 1985.

== Early years ==
Born on 25 June 1929, Harding grew up in Shakespeare Street, Leeds, across from St. James's Hospital. His father was an engineer, but during the 1930s recession, had to take part-time work on the railways. His mother worked in a mill, and Harding remembered that she secured a wage rise for the mill workers by taking the advice of her father, which was to kick the belt off the pulley which powered the looms. His father played piano, singing in public houses to supplement the family's income, but also sang at Leeds Town Hall in a production of Handel's Messiah, and with the Huddersfield Choral Society.

In 1935, the Harding family moved to 4 Accommodation Road, Leeds, with the young Harding attending York Road School. After the outbreak of World War II, the family were moved to 93 Poole Crescent, Cross Gates, where his mother obtained the position of managing the small Pendas Way railway station, at Manston, Leeds, which was part of the Leeds/Wetherby Railway route. Her duties included loading and unloading heavy parcels, and releasing homing pigeons from baskets. In 1943, at fourteen years of age, Harding left Cross Gates school, and after various jobs started work as a trimmer at John Barran's clothing factory.

== National service and politics ==
Harding was called up for National Service after the war, completing his basic training at RAF Padgate, RAF Honiley, Castle Bromwich, and Hereford. He was then sent to Hamburg to serve in the RAF's 5352 Wing at Hamburg's Fuhlsbüttel airport, which was involved with the Berlin Airlift. He made friends with German families in the area, even though fraternisation was forbidden.

After being demobbed, he became a delegate for the Leeds No. 2 branch of the National Union of Tailors and Garment Workers, and then a delegate for the Leeds City Labour Party. (Harding's great-uncle became a member of IWW (Industrial Workers of the World) when he was working in Canada). In 1957, already being a member of the Cross Gates Ward Labour Party, Harding joined the Cross gates Tenants' and Householders' Association, and edited a community newspaper, the '’Miner'’. In the 1970s, he moved to London, and would live there for twenty years, working for the Socialist Labour League (later called the Workers Revolutionary Party). His opposition to corruption in the Party led him to participate in the expulsion of leader Gerry Healy, in 1985. Initially accused of "non-communist relations", it was later reported that Healy had sexually assaulted over twenty-six female comrades.

== Marriage and authorship ==
After time spent in Australia during 1986, he returned to Leeds, staying at the house of his brother's ex-wife and her four children, at 40 Eastwood Crescent, Swarcliffe. During a holiday in Sliema, Malta, he proposed marriage to her on 3 June 1988, and were married on 5 August of the same year, when Harding was 58 years old. In 1994, Harding was diagnosed with a psychological medical condition, so he and his wife moved from Swarcliffe to Garforth, before moving to a bungalow in Micklefield. He published the book, Staying Red: Why I Remain a Socialist, in 2005. It has been called "the only serious, autobiographical-historical, sustained approach to the story of the Socialist Labour League/Workers Revolutionary Party so far".

In 2007, the Leeds Tenants' Federation awarded Harding a glass plaque for "outstanding contributions to the community". In 2008, it was reported that Harding was working on a book about the Leeds-born Doris Storey; the winner of two Olympic swimming gold medals at the 1938 British Empire Games in Sydney, Australia. Harding lived at Woodview Court, Swarcliffe, with his wife, until his death in December 2013.
