= John Smeaton Academy =

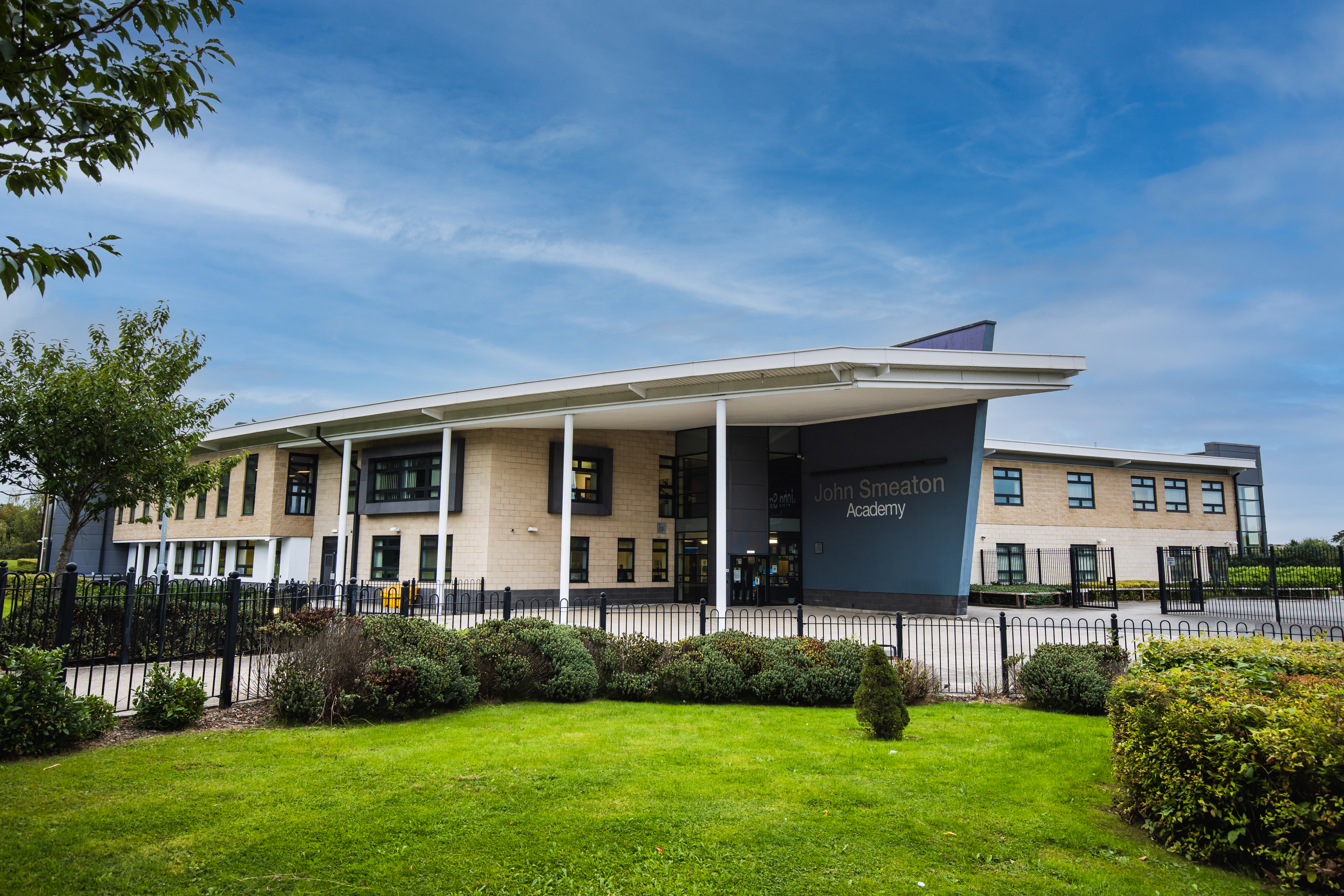
- The school in 2021

Location
- Smeaton Approach; Barwick Road; Leeds, West Yorkshire, LS15 8TA; England; 53.8142°N 1.4346°W

Information
- Type: Academy
- Local authority: Leeds City Council
- Trust: The Gorse Academies Trust
- Department for Education URN: 139282 Tables
- Ofsted: Reports
- Head teacher: Sir John Townsley (Temporary)
- Gender: Co-educational
- Age: 11 to 16
- Houses: Hawking, Dammond, Earhart, Shilling
- Colours: Hawking: yellow, Dammond: purple, Shilling: red, Earhart: blue
- Website: http://www.johnsmeatonacademy.org.uk/

John Smeaton Academy is a co-educational secondary school located in Leeds, West Yorkshire, England.

The school educates children aged 11–16 from across Leeds and its surrounding villages including Scholes, Cross Gates, Barwick-in-Elmet, Pendas Fields and Swarcliffe.

The school is part of the Gorse Academies Trust.

== History ==
The school was previously called John Smeaton Community High School, named after 18th-century civil engineer John Smeaton of Austhorpe, and its buildings occupied the site of the current school playing fields.

Until August 1992, a middle school occupied one of the buildings on the school site.

The original school buildings were demolished in 2007 to make way for a new school, built by Carillion, at cost of £100 million.

The school was called John Smeaton Community College in 2009. At that time, a report to the Chief Executive of Education Leeds said that schools like "John Smeaton Community College and the David Young Community Academy have transformed standards and outcomes in areas of Leeds where in the past poor standards and poor outcomes were simply accepted as the norm".

The school became an academy in 2014 and joined multi-academy trust United Learning. In 2021 the school became part of the Gorse Academies Trust.

In October 2021, the school introduced the '100% attendance club' as an incentive to promote good student attendance.

== Academic performance ==
Prior to joining United Learning and converting to an academy, the school was rated 'Inadequate' by Ofsted and placed in Special Measures.

In December 2016, Ofsted inspectors concluded that the school 'Requires Improvement', praising the capacity of leaders to improve further.

In August 2017, 46% of students achieved five or more A*-C grades including 4 or above in English and maths – an increase from the previous year. There were also improvements in the number of students achieving at least a grade 4 – equivalent to the old 'C' grade – in English and maths respectively.

== Notable former pupils and staff ==
- Phil, Lord Willis - Head Teacher at the school from 1983 to 1997 and then Liberal Democrat politician.
- Josh Warrington - English professional Featherweight boxer.
