= Aberford Dykes =

Series of archaeological earthworks

Coordinates: 53°50′12″N 1°22′03.6″W

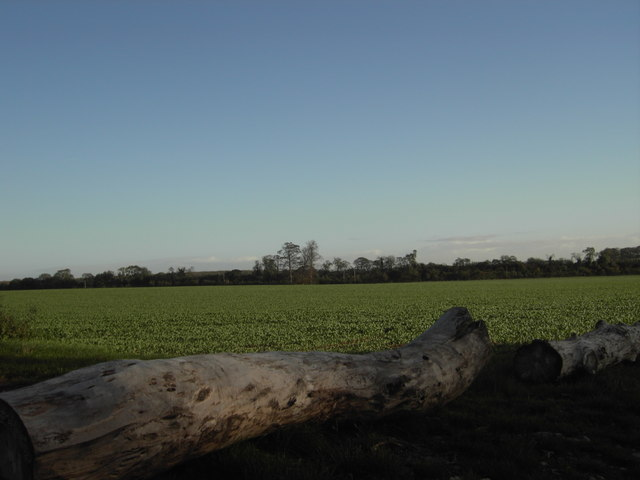
Woodhouse Moor Rein

The Aberford Dykes are a series of archaeological monuments located around the valley of the Cock Beck, where it runs just north of the village of Aberford on the border between North and West Yorkshire, England.

The complex consists of three individual earthworks: Becca Banks/the Ridge, the South Dyke, and Woodhouse Moor Rein.

== History ==
The date and function of the Aberford Dykes are not known for sure. It seems likely that the monuments were built at different times, and possibly for different purposes. Becca Banks/the Ridge has a strongly defensive nature, and may have been built to control a ford over the Cock Beck. Becca Banks/the Ridge runs across the Roman road between Castleford and Tadcaster. However the sequential relationship between the earthwork and the Roman road is not known. Some suggest the monument was built to defend against a Roman invasion and the road was later built right through it. Earlier writers thought the monument was built to protect the road, possibly in the 'Dark Ages' by the Kingdom of Elmet. Where subjected to archaeological excavation, the monuments have been found to date from the late Iron Age (104 BCE to 12 CE in the case of the South Dyke) and it would seem the ditches were silting up during the Roman period.

Becca Banks/the Ridge is the principal monument in the group. This runs for nearly 3 miles (5 km) on a mostly east–west course along the north side of the Cock Beck valley. It consists of a bank with a ditch situated on its southern (downslope) side. A slight natural scarp slope is exploited in the positioning of the bank above the ditch, and the top of the bank would have stood up to 25 feet (7.6 m) above the base of the ditch.

The other two monuments are located on the south side of the Cock Beck valley, and do not share the strong defensive characteristics of Becca Banks/the Ridge. For instance, the ditch of the South Dyke lies on the upslope side of its bank.

== The Aberford Dykes today ==
As scheduled monuments, the Aberford Dykes are legally protected. They still have a role in the modern landscape, serving as field boundaries and marking county and parish boundaries. Much of the length of the Aberford Dykes can be walked via the public footpaths that run along them.
