= Manston, Leeds =

Suburb of Leeds, England

Coordinates: 53.80758°N 1.445395°W

Manston
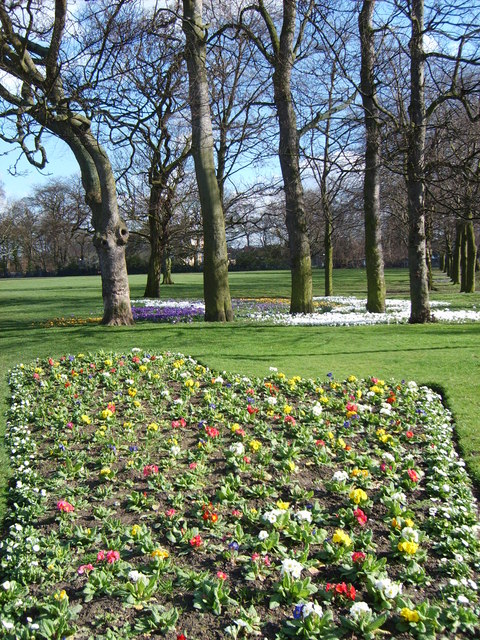
- Manston Park

- Location within West Yorkshire
- Metropolitan borough: City of Leeds
- Metropolitan county: West Yorkshire
- Region: Yorkshire and the Humber
- Country: England
- Sovereign state: United Kingdom
- Post town: Leeds
- Postcode district: LS15
- Dialling code: 0113
- Police: West Yorkshire
- Fire: West Yorkshire
- Ambulance: Yorkshire
- UK Parliament: Leeds East

Manston is a suburb and former village to the east of Cross Gates, Leeds, England, situated 4 miles (6 km) east of Leeds city centre.

== Geography ==
Situated in the Cross Gates & Whinmoor ward of Leeds City Council and Leeds East parliamentary constituency, the area is east of the A6120 Outer Ring Road, and sits between Barwick Road to the north and Austhorpe Road to the south.

It is named after the former Manston Hall on Manston Lane and the surrounding estate, owned by the Gascoigne family. Many streets in the area are named after the estate, including Manston Crescent and Manston Grove.

Manston is also home to Manston Park, a public park, and a pub named after the area, The Barnbow (formerly The Manston Hotel) to the east of the park.

The local Parish Church and a local primary school, Manston St James Primary Academy, are named after St James the Great. There are also two other primary schools in Manston Primary and St Theresa's Catholic Primary Schools.

The area also contains Barnbow, the site of a munitions factory in both First World War, the interwar period and Second World War. Now a scheduled monument, a memorial to those killed in a 5 December 1916 explosion at the munitions factory is situated in Manston Park.

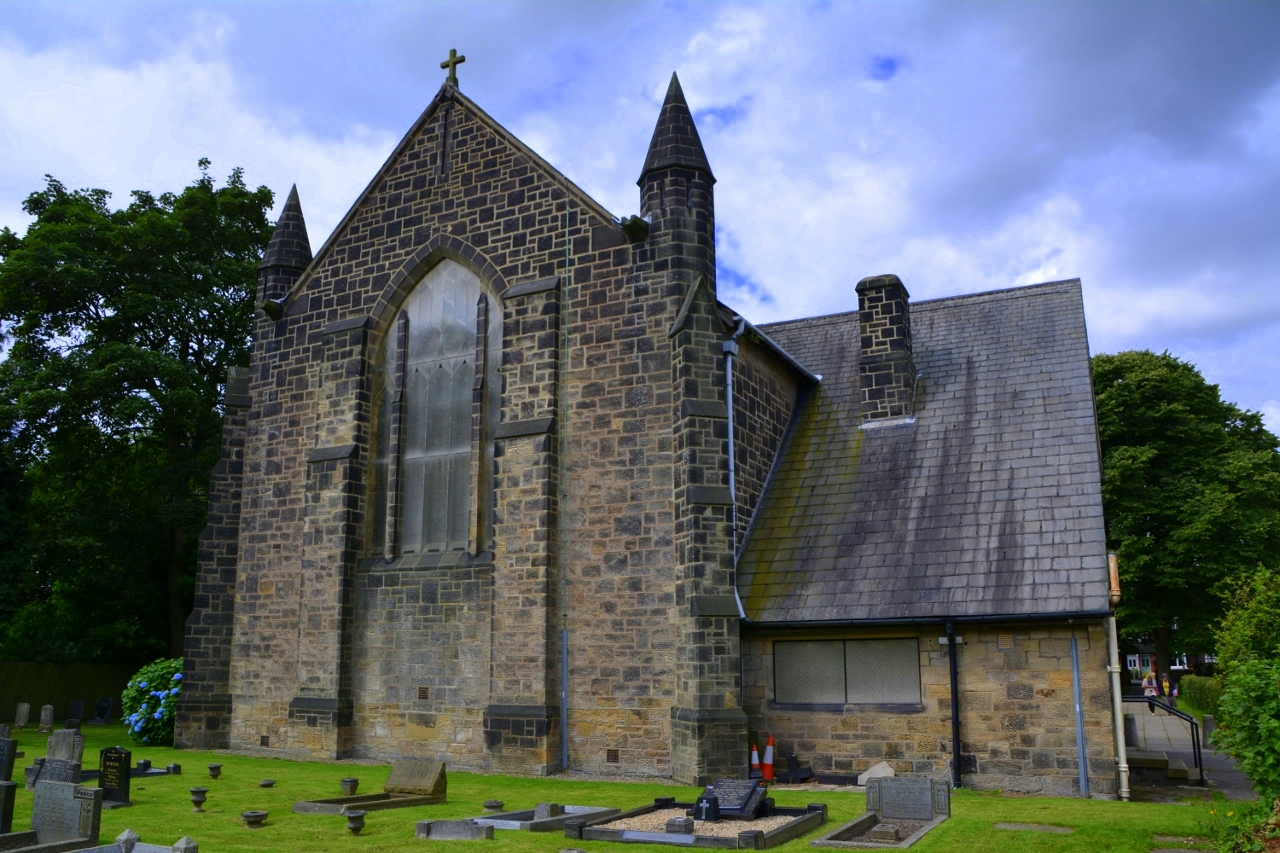
St James Church

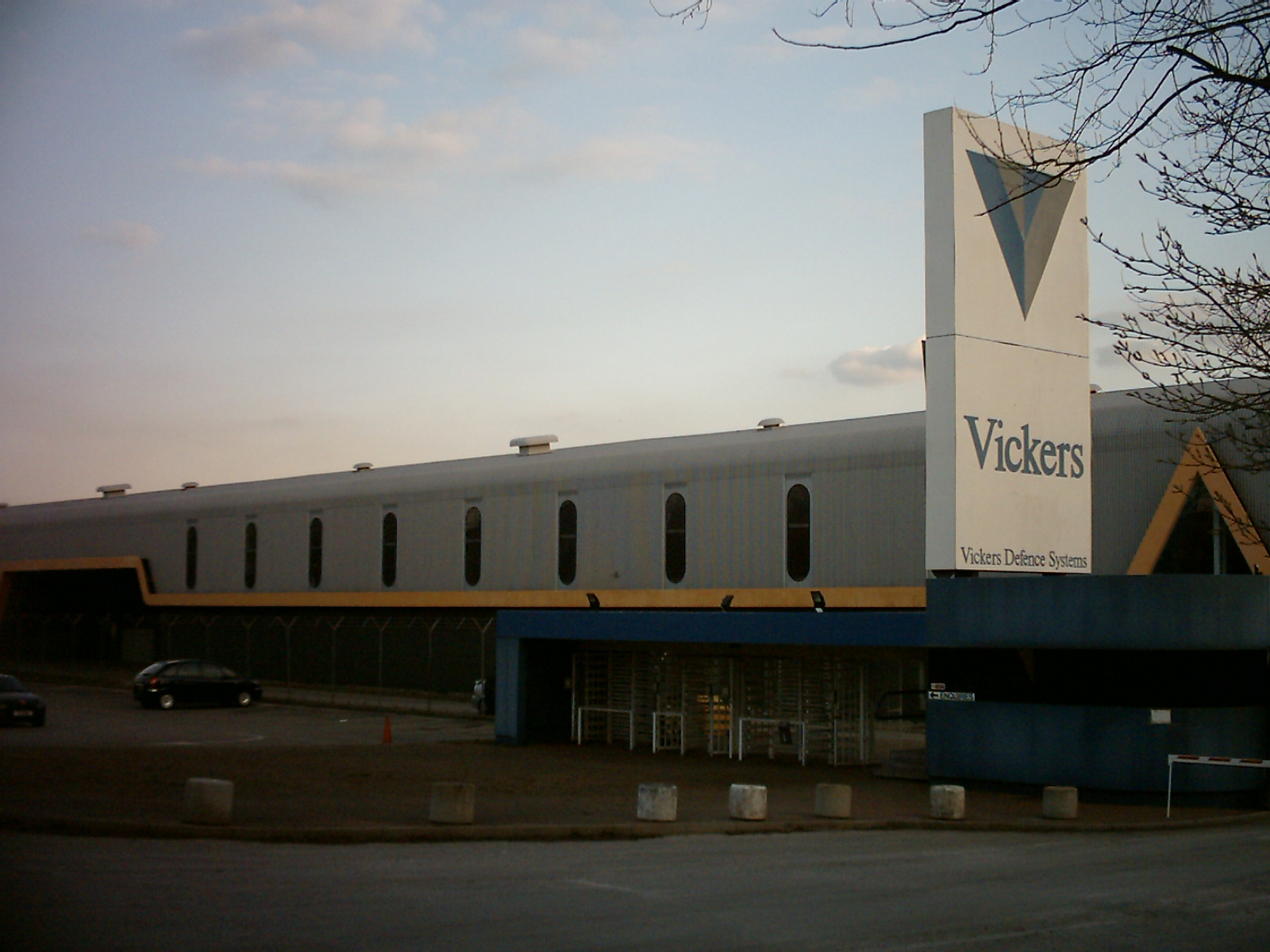
The Vickers works, formerly Barnbow Royal Ordnance Factory

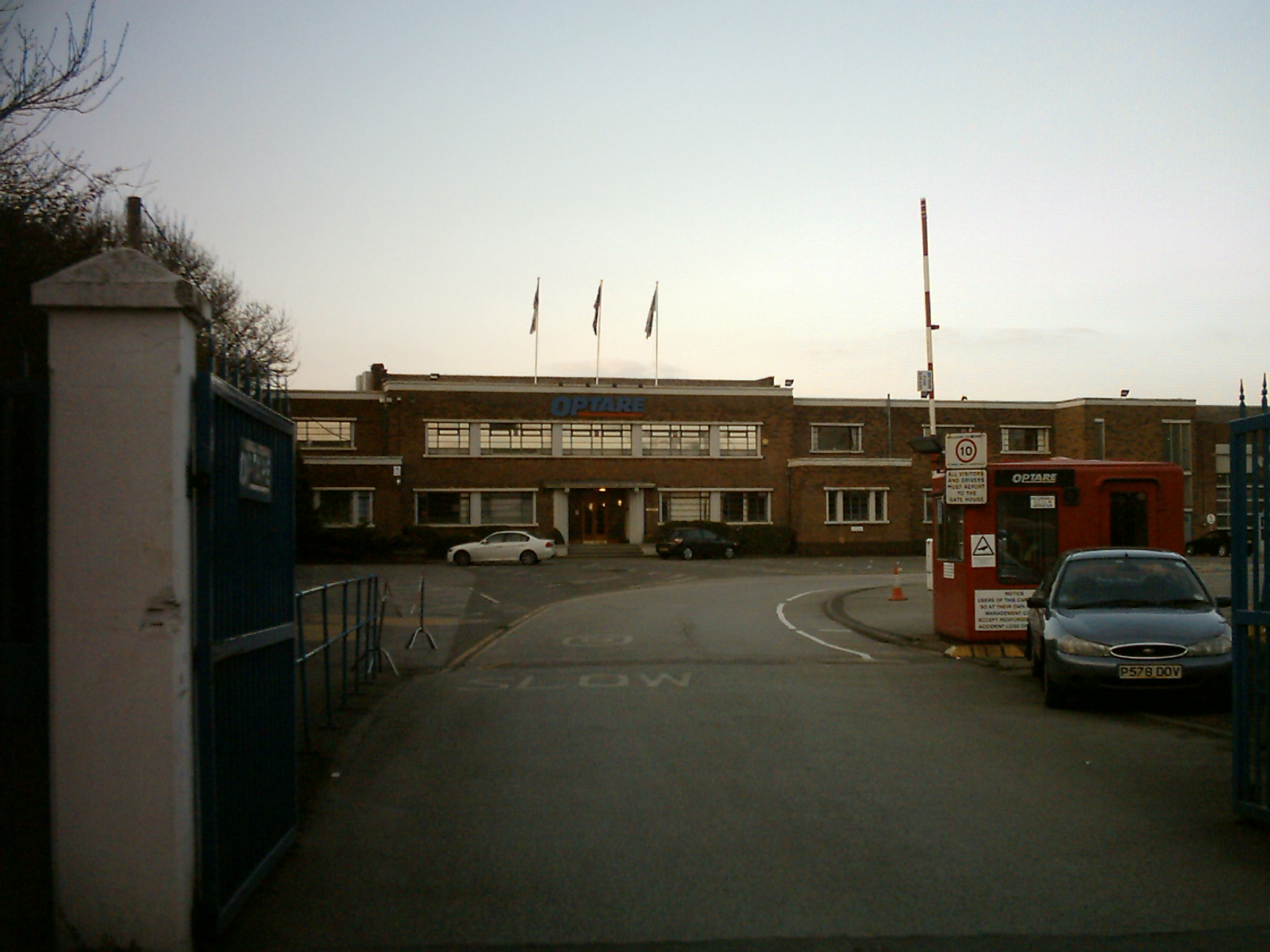
The old Optare bus factory in Manston

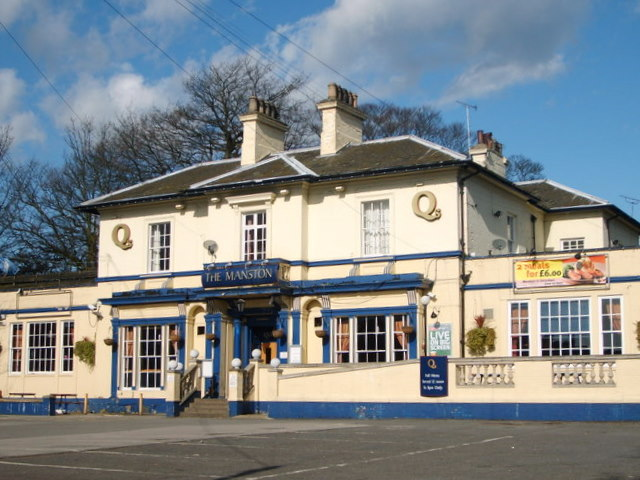
The Manston public house, now called The Barnbow
