= John Kelly =

John or Jack Kelly may refer to:

== People ==
=== Academics and scientists ===
- John Kelly (engineer) (1935–2022), Irish professor, registrar of University College Dublin
- John Kelly (scholar) (1750–1809), at Douglas, Isle of Man
- John E. Kelly III (born 1954), American executive at IBM
- John F. Kelly (professor), professor of addiction medicine
- John Forrest Kelly (1859–1922), scientist
- John Larry Kelly Jr. (1923–1965), scientist at Bell Labs
- John Norman Davidson Kelly (1909–1997), British theologian and academic

=== Arts and entertainment ===
- Jack Kelly (actor) (1927–1992), American film and TV actor, in American TV series Maverick
- John Kelly (actor) (1901–1947), American film actor whose credits include Meet Dr. Christian
- John Kelly (Australian artist) (born 1965)
- John Kelly (Irish artist) (1932–2006)
- John Kelly (author) (born 1964), British author and illustrator
- John Kelly (born 1978), member of the Doctor Who Restoration Team
- John Kelly (Irish broadcaster) (born 1965), Irish radio broadcaster and presenter of The View
- John Liddell Kelly (1850–1925), British journalist and poet
- John Melville Kelly (1879–1962), American/Hawaiian artist
- John Kelly (performance artist) (born 1959), American performance artist, visual artist and writer
- Johnny Kelly (born 1968), American drummer
- John Kelly (born 1980), director of Academy Award-nominated animated short Retirement Plan
- John David Kelly (artist) (1862–1958), Canadian painter, printmaker and artist-illustrator
- John Kelly (journalist) (1943–2022), Irish journalist and author

=== Politicians ===
==== United Kingdom ====
- John Kelly (Sinn Féin politician) (1936–2007), Northern Irish republican leader
- John Richards Kelly (1844–1922), British member of parliament for Camberwell North, 1886–1892
- Basil Kelly (John William Basil Kelly, 1920–2008), Northern Irish Unionist politician

==== United States ====
- Jack Kelly (politician) (born c. 1939), former Philadelphia Republican councilman-at-large
- John Kelly (New York politician) (1822–1886), politician in Tammany Hall, U.S. representative from New York (1855–1858)
- John B. Kelly (Boston politician) (1904–1969), Boston City councilor
- John David Kelly (judge) (1934–1998), American judge
- John F. Kelly (born 1950), White House chief of staff, United States Marine Corps general, and secretary of homeland security
- John F. Kelly (Michigan politician) (1949–2018), judge advocate general and state senator for Michigan
- John R. Kelly (born 1946), Republican member of the West Virginia House of Delegates
- John V. Kelly (1926–2009), American Republican Party politician in New Jersey
- John Kelly (Brooklyn politician) (1855–1900), American politician from New York

==== Other countries ====
- John Kelly (bailiff) (c. 1793–1854), member of the House of Keys and high bailiff of Castletown, Isle of Man
- John Kelly (Canadian politician) (1852–1934), municipal councillor in Edmonton, Alberta, Canada
- John Kelly (New South Wales politician) (1840–1896), Australian politician
- John Kelly (Roscommon politician) (born 1960), Irish Labour Party Senator
- John M. Kelly (politician) (1931–1991), Irish Fine Gael politician, cabinet member, legal scholar, and novelist
- John Robert Kelly (1849–1919), farmer and politician in colonial South Australia

=== Military personnel ===
- John Kelly of Killanne (died 1798), leader of the Irish Rebellion of 1798 in Wexford
- John Sherwood-Kelly (1880–1931), adventurer and soldier awarded the Victoria Cross
- John Kelly (Royal Navy officer) (1871–1936), British admiral of the fleet
- John D. Kelly (Korean War soldier) (1928–1952), USMC, Korean War Medal of Honor recipient
- John D. Kelly (World War II soldier) (1923–1944), American soldier, World War II Medal of Honor recipient
- John F. Kelly (born 1950), White House chief of staff, United States Marine Corps general, and secretary of homeland security
- John H. Kelly (1840–1864), Confederate brigadier general
- John J. Kelly (1898–1957), USMC, World War I, Army Medal of Honor and Navy Medal of Honor recipient

=== Sportspeople ===
==== Association football ====
- Jack Kelly (English footballer) (1913–2000), with clubs including Burnley and Leeds United
- John Kelly (footballer, born 1909) (1909–?), English footballer for York City
- John Kelly (footballer, born 1913) (1913–?), English footballer for Bradford City
- John Kelly (footballer, born 1921) (1921–2001), Scottish international football player (Barnsley)
- John Kelly (footballer, born 1935) (1935–2012), Scottish footballer for Crewe Alexandra
- John Kelly (footballer, born 1960), Anglo-Irish soccer player whose clubs included Tranmere Rovers, Preston
- John Paul Kelly (footballer) (born 1987), Irish footballer

==== American football ====
- John Kelly (offensive lineman) (1944–2015)
- John Kelly (running back) (born 1996)
- Shipwreck Kelly (American football) (John Simms Kelly, 1910–1986)
- Jack Kelly (American football) (born 2003)

==== Rugby football ====
- John Kelly (rugby, born 1917) (1917–?), English rugby union and professional rugby league footballer
- John Kelly (rugby union, born 1974), Irish rugby union player
- John Kelly (rugby union, born 1995), English rugby union player
- Jack Kelly (rugby union, born 1926) (1926–2002), New Zealand rugby union player
- Jack Kelly (rugby union, born 1997), Irish rugby union player

==== Other sports ====
- Kick Kelly (John O. Kelly, 1856–1926), American baseball player and umpire, boxing referee and gambling operator
- Jack Kelly (swimmer) (born 2003), American and Irish professional swimmer
- Jack Kelly (Australian footballer) (1916–1971), Australian rules footballer for St Kilda
- John Kelly (boxer) (1932–2016), Northern Irish boxer
- Nonpareil Jack Dempsey (John Edward Kelly, 1862–1895), Irish-born middleweight boxer
- John Kelly (catcher) (1859–1908), 1879–1884 baseball player
- John Kelly (equestrian) (1925–2004), Australian Olympic equestrian
- John Kelly (golfer) (born 1984), American amateur golfer
- John Kelly (Lancashire and Derbyshire cricketer) (1922–1979), English cricketer
- John Kelly (Nottinghamshire cricketer) (1930–2008), English cricketer
- John Kelly (outfielder) (1879–1944), 1907 baseball player
- John Kelly (race walker) (1929–2012), Irish Olympic athlete
- John Kelly (triple jumper) (born c. 1938), American triple and long jumper, 1959 NCAA runner-up for the Stanford Cardinal track and field team
- John Kelly (sportscaster) (born 1960), ice hockey sportscaster
- John Kelly (Tipperary hurler) (1948–2023), Irish sportsperson
- Jack Kelly Jr. (rower) (1927–1985), John B. Kelly Jr., an Olympic rower, Philadelphia councilman, head of the US Olympic Committee and brother of Grace Kelly
- Jack Kelly Sr. (rower) (1889–1960), John B. Kelly Sr. (nicknamed "Jack"), Olympic rower, father of actress, Grace Kelly and John B. Kelly Jr.
- Jack Kelly (hurler) (born 1996), Irish hurler
- John Kelly (runner) (born 1984), American endurance athlete
- John-Paul Kelly (ice hockey) (born 1959), Canadian ice hockey player
- Johnny Kelly (hurler) (born 1971), Irish hurler and hurling manager

=== Other people ===
- John Kelly (1840–1904), British architect specialising in churches; see Kelly & Birchall
- John Kelly (coal merchant) (1840–1904), Irish businessperson, philanthropist and shipowner
- John Kelly (diplomat) (born 1941), British diplomat and governor of the Turks and Caicos Islands
- John Kelly (minister) (1801–1876), Congregational minister
- John Kelly (bishop) (1915–1987), Australian bishop of the Catholic Church
- John A. Kelly (1943–1978), American investigative journalist in Boston, Massachusetts
- Gregory Kelly (bishop) (John Gregory Kelly, born 1956), American Roman Catholic bishop
- John Hall Kelly (1879–1941), Canadian high commissioner to Ireland
- John Hubert Kelly (1939–2011), U.S. diplomat
- John P. Kelly (clergyman), convening apostle of the International Coalition of Apostolic Leaders
- John Trevor Kelly (1914–1939), Australian convicted murderer
- Jack Kelly, founder of British news organization TLDR News

== Characters ==
- John Clark (Ryanverse character), born John Terence Kelly, a character in a number of Tom Clancy novels
- Jack Kelly, a character in the 1992 Disney film Newsies
- Jack Kelly, lawyer uncle in It's Always Sunny in Philadelphia
- John Kelly (NYPD Blue), a character on the TV series NYPD Blue, played by David Caruso
- John Kelly, a character on the TV series Brooklyn Nine-Nine, played by Phil Reeves

== Other ==
- John Kelly Girls' Technology College
- John Kelly Limited, shipowner, coal and oil merchant
- John P. Kelly (album), 2001, by rapper Mr. Cheeks

== See also ==
- Jon Kelly (disambiguation)
- John Kelley (disambiguation)
- John Paul Kelly (disambiguation)
