= Johnny Kelley (disambiguation) =

Johnny Kelley (1907–2004) was an American long-distance runner who won the Boston Marathon in 1935 and 1945, also known as "Kelley the Elder"

Johnny Kelley or Kelly may also refer to:

- John J. Kelley (1930–2011), American long-distance runner who won the 1957 Boston Marathon, also known as "Kelley the Younger"
- Johnny Kelly (born 1968), American drummer

== See also ==
- John Kelley (disambiguation)
- John Kelly (disambiguation)
