= Dom Kelly =

Dom Kelly may refer to:

- Dom Kelly (activist)
- Dom Kelly (footballer) (1917–1982), English footballer
- Dominic Kelly (cricketer)
- Dominick Kelly, 18th-century Irish poet
