= John Calley (disambiguation) =

John Calley was a film producer.

John Calley may also refer to:

- John Calley (engineer)
- John Calley, character in News of the World (film)

== See also ==
- John Caley, archivist
- John Callie, rower
- John Kelley (disambiguation)
