= John Kelley =

John, Jack, or Johnny Kelley may refer to:

== Sports ==
- Jack Kelley (ice hockey) (1927–2020), American ice hockey coach
- John Kelley (ice hockey) (1907–1986), American ice hockey player
- John J. Kelley (1930–2011), American runner, winner of the 1957 Boston Marathon; "Kelley the Younger"
- Johnny Kelley (1907–2004), American runner, winner of the 1935 and 1945 Boston Marathons; "Kelley the Elder"

== Other ==
- Jack Kelley (politician), New Hampshire state legislator
- John Kelley (diplomat), acting U.S. alternate representative to the United Nations
- John Kelley (criminal), reputed mobster who was an associate of the Patriarca crime family
- John C. Kelley, American television writer and producer
- John Edward Kelley (1853–1941), U.S. Representative from South Dakota
- John L. Kelley (1916–1999), American mathematician
- John William Kelley (born 1963), American serial killer
- Jack Kelley (journalist), USA Today reporter
- John Kelley (Medal of Honor), Irish-born recipient of the Medal of Honor

== See also ==
- Jon Kelley (born 1965), American sports journalist, author, producer, and television personality
- John Kelly (disambiguation)
- John Calley (1930–2011), American film studio executive and producer
- John Calley (engineer) (1663–1725), British
