= Too Long =

Too Long may refer to:

== Music ==
- Too Long, a 1983 album by Locomotiv GT
- "2 Long" (Andrzej Piaseczny song), 2001
- "Too Long", a song by Daft Punk from Discovery, 2001
- "Too Long", a song by Lokomotiv GT, 1983
- "Too Long", a song by Magnum Bonum, 1978
- "Too Long", a song by Tanya Tucker, 1983
- "Too Long", a song by Terri Gibbs, 1981

== Other ==
- "Too Long", a newspaper created by British news organization TLDR News

== See also ==
- Long (disambiguation)
