= TLDR (disambiguation) =

TL;DR is a form of internet slang frequently used to indicate a summary of a longer text.

TLDR may also refer to:

- Domain name registrar, sometimes referred to as a TLD registry, a service that manages the reservation of Internet domain names
- TLDR News, a British news outlet primarily based on YouTube and Nebula
- TLDR Pages, a collaborative software documentation project
