= John Edward Kelly =

John Edward Kelly may refer to:

- John-Edward Kelly (1958–2015), American conductor and saxophonist
- John Kelly (New South Wales politician) (John Edward Kelly, 1840–1896)
- Nonpareil Dempsey (John Edward Kelly, 1862–1895), Irish-born middleweight boxer

== See also ==
- John Kelly (disambiguation)
