= Tommy Fitzgerald (footballer) =

Irish soccer player during the 1990s

Personal information
- Full name: Tommy Fitzgerald
- Date of birth: 2 January 1970 (age 56)
- Place of birth: Dublin, Ireland
- Position: Forward

Youth career
- OLV
- Rangers Dublin
- Lourdes Celtic

Senior career*
| Years | Team | Apps | (Gls) |
| 1986–1989 | Tottenham Hotspur | 0 | (0) |
| | → FC Copenhagen (loan) | ? | (?) |
| 1989–1991 | Shelbourne | 7 | (2) |
| 1990 | → Waterford United (loan) | 9 | (3) |
| 1991 | → Limerick City (loan) | 23 | (12) |
| 1991–1992 | Limerick City | 42 | (7) |
| 1992–1994 | Bohemians | 24 | (3) |
| 1994–1995 | Monaghan United | | |

International career
| 1989 | Republic of Ireland Under-21 | 2 | (0) |
- * Club domestic league appearances and goals

Tommy Fitzgerald (born 2 January 1970) was an Irish soccer player during the 1990s.

== Career ==
Tommy was brought up in the pimlico area of South Dublin and served his time in schoolboy football with the likes of OLV and Lourdes Celtic before going cross-channel to join Tottenham Hotspur at the age of 16 as a trainee. Tommy turned pro after six months.

Tommy played in a strong youth team at Spurs alongside the likes of Guy Butters and was a regular in their reserves but couldn't make the breakthrough to the first team scoring 50 goals from 50 app and went out on loan to( Fc copenhagen) was released after 3 seasons in London.

Fitzgerald decided to return home despite an offer from fc Copenhagen in Denmark and David Webb's Southend United and he signed for Shelbourne. He made his debut for Shels on 3 September 1989. He was in and out of the starting line up during his time at Tolka Park and went on loan to Waterford United and then Limerick City in his second season at Shels.

He impressed while on loan at Limerick and signed for them in time for the 1991/92 season. He made 23 appearances in the league that season scoring 12 times as Limerick won the First Division Title under the management of Sam Allardyce. This form impressed Eamonn Gregg who signed him for Bohemians in the summer of 1992.Tommy had to retire due to injury on right knee with Longford town in 1996

== International career ==
Tommy won 2 Republic of Ireland Under-21 caps in 1989, against Senegal and France "B".
