= Stephen Rice (footballer) =

Irish footballer and coach

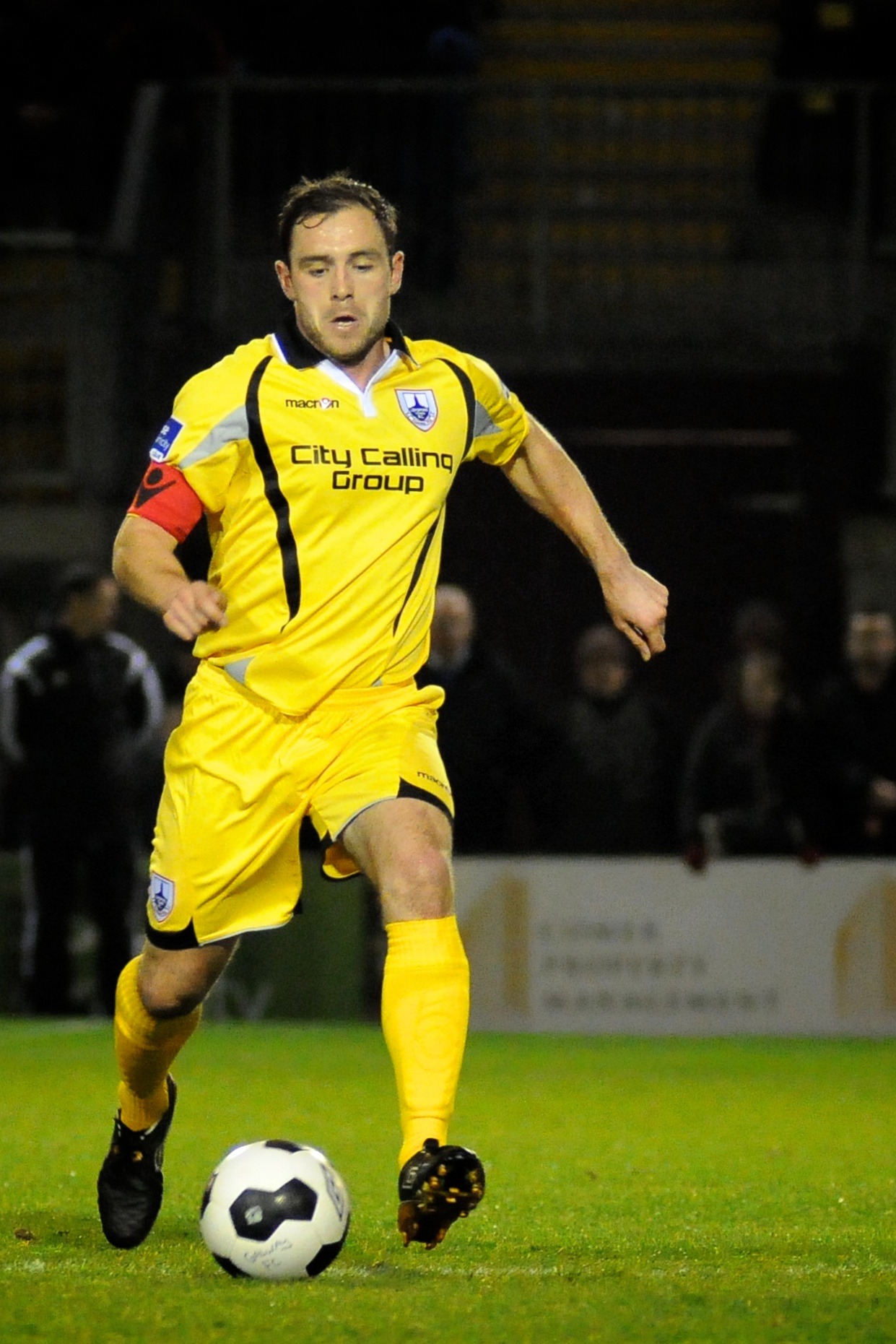
- Stephen Rice in action for Longford Town in a 1-0 win against Galway in the League of Ireland First Division in March 2014

Personal information
- Date of birth: 6 October 1984 (age 42)
- Place of birth: Dublin, Ireland
- Position: Midfielder

Team information
- Current team: Brentford (set piece coach)

Youth career
- Lourdes Celtic

Senior career*
Years	Team	Apps	(Gls)
2001–2002	Coventry City	0	(0)
2002–2003	Shelbourne	0	(0)
2003–2007	Bohemians	108	(4)
2003	→ Monaghan United (loan)	?	(0)
2008–2013	Shamrock Rovers	90	(9)
2014–2015	Longford Town	55	(5)
2016	Glentoran	4	(0)

International career
2000	Republic of Ireland U16	2	(0)
2007–2008	Republic of Ireland U23	3	(1)
- * Club domestic league appearances and goals

Stephen Rice (born 6 October 1984) is an Irish football coach and former player. During his playing career he played as a midfielder. He is currently set piece coach of Brentford.

== Career ==
Rice was signed by then Bohs manager Stephen Kenny in 2003, after spells in the youth ranks at Coventry City and Shelbourne. He went out on loan to Monaghan United for three months of the 2003 season and he made his debut the following season away to Longford Town on 20 March 2004.

Opportunities were not forthcoming, and Rice found himself playing at right-full for the senior side, a position which he retained throughout the 2004–06 seasons. He was awarded Bohemians' Player of the Year award in 2005.

In the 2007 season, under Sean Connor, Bohemians signed Owen Heary, regarded as the country's premier right-full, and Mark Rossiter, another player in that position. Rice's future at the club looked uncertain. However, due to injuries and suspensions, he was given the opportunity to play in his natural midfield position.

=== Departure from Bohemians ===
In August 2007, following an alleged contract dispute with Bohs, Sean Connor told Rice he was free to leave and would not play for the club again while he was in charge. Within days, Stockport County had made a bid to sign Rice but he turned them down. However, after two months out of the team, Rice made his return for Bohs as a substitute in a 2–0 defeat against Shamrock Rovers and featured in the first team squad for the rest of the season.

=== Shamrock Rovers ===
On 3 November 2007, Rice signed for Shamrock Rovers on a two-year deal. He made his competitive debut for Rovers in the first game of the 2008 season, scoring his first goal at Galway on 29 March. On 25 June 2008, he was placed on the transfer list at his own request. He was appointed Chairman of the PFAI in November 2009. But he stepped aside as chairman in November 2010. Rice captained the 2010 League winning side and was voted Rovers' Player of the Year for the 2010 season. On 29 September 2011, Rice scored for Rovers against Tottenham Hotspur at White Hart Lane in the UEFA Europa League.

Rice re-signed for Rovers for the 2013 League of Ireland season, but was released when the contract ended in November.

=== Longford Town ===
Rice signed for Longford on 11 January 2014. He played a pivotal role in helping 'De Town' win the League of Ireland First Division 2014 title. Following a season playing a central role in the Town finishing 6th in the Premier Division, Rice was released by the club in November 2015.

=== Glentoran ===
On 23 February 2016, Rice impressed boss Alan Kernaghan in a friendly with Derry City and was awarded a contract until the end of the season. Kernaghan said "I am delighted to have signed a player with such great experience and above all an obvious hunger to play for Glentoran and move us forward".

Rice left Glentoran on 7 April 2016 to focus on his coaching career with the Football Association of Ireland in Dublin.

== International career ==
In October 2000, Rice played for the Republic of Ireland national football team U16s in a qualifying tournament in Riga for the 2001 UEFA European Under-16 Championship where he came up against Andrés Iniesta. He also represented his country at U19 level.

He was one of four Rovers players to make their debut at U23 level in November 2007 in the 2007–09 International Challenge Trophy . Rice then scored the winner in his second appearance. He made his third and last appearance at this level in a defeat to Belgium in October 2008.

== Honours ==
=== Club ===
Shamrock Rovers

- League of Ireland Premier Division (2): 2010, 2011
- Setanta Sports Cup (2): 2011, 2013
- League of Ireland Cup (1): 2013
- Leinster Senior Cup (1): 2013

Longford Town

- League of Ireland First Division (1): 2014

=== Individual ===
- Shamrock Rovers Player of the Year (1): 2010
