= Jonathan Kelly (disambiguation) =

Jonathan Kelly (1947–2020) was an Irish folk rock singer-songwriter.

Jonathan or Jon Kelly may also refer to:

- Jonathan Kelly (oboist) (born 1969), English
- Jonathan Falconbridge Kelly (1817 – c. 1855), American journalist and humorist
- Jon Kelly, British audio engineer and record producer
- Jon Kelly (swimmer) (born 1965) Canadian butterfly swimmer

== See also ==
- Jon Kelley (born 1965), American sports journalist and television personality
- John Kelly (disambiguation)
