= Crawshaw Woods Bridge =

Listed bridge in West Yorkshire

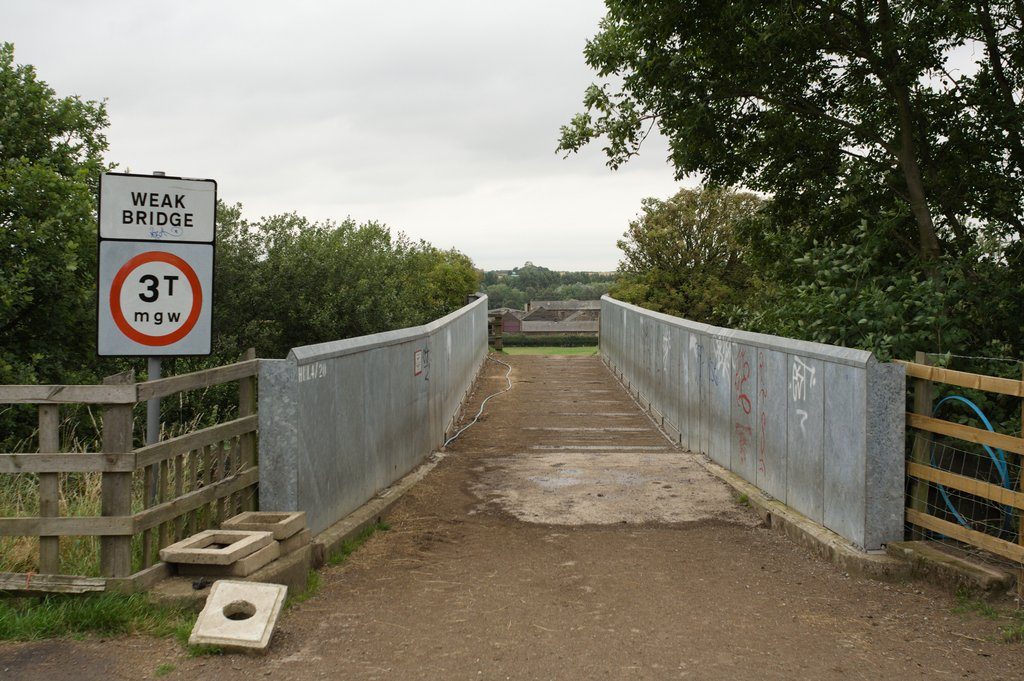
- Crawshaw Woods Bridge
- Coordinates: 53°48′10″N 1°24′48″W
- OS grid reference: SE387341
- Carries: Shippen Road
- Crosses: Leeds to Selby railway line
- Locale: Cross Gates, West Yorkshire, England
- Other name(s): Shippen Lane Bridge
- Owner: Network Rail (NR)
- Heritage status: Grade II listed
- NR number: HUL 4/20

Characteristics
- Material: Cast iron
- Total length: 50 feet (15 m)

History
- Designer: James Watson
- Engineering design by: Stanningley Ironworks
- Opened: 1834
- Rebuilt: 1943; 1999; 2006

Crawshaw Woods Bridge (also known as Shippen Lane Bridge) is a Grade II listed cast iron overbridge which spans the Leeds to Selby railway line between Cross Gates and Garforth railway stations. It is notable for being the oldest railway-associated iron bridge still in daily use on an operational railway. Due to an upgrade to the line which runs beneath it, the abutments of the bridge will be raised by 4 feet 7 inches (1.4 m), and then the iron arch re-installed at a new height to accommodate electric overhead wires underneath.

== History ==
The bridge, which is between Cross Gates and Garforth railway stations, was designed by James Walker, and engineered by Stanningley Ironworks for the Leeds and Selby Railway in 1834. Most of the other bridges on the line were constructed of stone, but Crawshaw Woods Bridge is a cast iron bridge set into stone abutments on either side of the line. (Note: The only other iron bridge over the line was at Garforth station, and this was removed in 2024 and replaced with a newer structure with lifts at either side of the upper bridge deck. The old iron bridge was donated to the Bredgar and Wormshill Light Railway in Kent.) It is thought that the ground underneath the bridge would not support the weight of an all stone structure, so a "single-span, segmental-arched bridge with wrought iron railing balustrades and curved mushroom-top stone piers" was placed there instead. The bridge was renewed by the LNER in 1943 (when a timber deck was installed above the original surface, making the structure non-loadbearing) and it was also renovated by Railtrack in 1999. It was strengthened in 2006 by Network Rail. The bridge spans a gap of 50 feet (15 m) and has three segmental ribs, each 15 inches (380 mm) deep, and is largely cast iron, but the supporting materials are sandstone, wrought iron, steel and concrete. The added deck structure has metal panelling along its length, which one report describes as "unsympathetic".

The overbridge was designed to stretch over four lines, but in the event, only two lines were built on the line and these are closer to one side of the bank with the other side being piled up with earth. As the tracks are slewed to one side, the track in the middle is 16 feet 10 inches (5.13 m) below the arch, and the other track is 15 feet 4 inches (4.67 m) below the arch. The bridge is too low to accommodate the overhead line equipment for the electrification of the line as part of the Transpennine Route Upgrade, so it will be raised by 4 feet 7 inches (1.4 m). The structure will be jacked up at a cost of £3.7 million (as opposed to an entirely new deck structure at £1.4 million), this is deemed to be a better financial alternative to the option of lowering the track, which is estimated to cost £14.6 million (2024 prices). Work will also be undertaken on the road deck of the bridge, which sits atop the iron-arch structure. This has solid-steel parapets which stand clear, and are structurally independent of, the bridge.

The bridge was grade II listed in 2015, being hailed by Historic England as a "..testament to one of the "Victorian's greatest achievements" - railways." The bridge carries a public bridleway over the railway, and is also used by agricultural traffic. During the First World War, it was used by workers to get to the Barnbow munitions factory on the north side of the line. Therefore, it is of historical interest due to its association with Barnbow, and it being the oldest cast iron bridge still in-situ over a working railway in the world. (Note: There are two known cast iron bridges of earlier construction than Crawshaw Woods Bridge: one on the Stockton and Darlington Railway (1825) which was designed by George Stephenson, and is now in the National Railway Museum in York. The other, on the Liverpool and Manchester Railway was demolished towards the end of the 19th century.)

The bridge has the numbered designation of HUL 4/20 on the British railway's engineer's line reference system, being nearly 6 miles (9.7 km) east of Leeds railway station, and 14 miles 49 chains (23.5 km) west of Selby.

== See also ==
- Listed buildings in Leeds (Cross Gates and Whinmoor Ward)
