= Tony Sheridan (footballer) =

Irish footballer (born 1974)

Personal information
- Full name: Anthony Joseph Sheridan
- Date of birth: 21 October 1974 (age 52)
- Place of birth: Dublin, Ireland
- Position: Midfielder

Youth career
- Lourdes Celtic

Senior career*
Years	Team	Apps	(Gls)
1991–1995	Coventry City	9	(0)
1995–1999	Shelbourne	119	(21)
1999–2000	Portadown	33	(4)
2000–2001	Cardiff City	0	(0)
2000–2001	Shelbourne	4	(0)
2001–2002	Dublin City	28	(4)
2002–2003	Shelbourne	4	(0)
2002–2003	→ Glenavon (loan)	3	(0)
2003	Waterford United	0	(0)
2005	Shamrock Rovers	16	(2)
Total		216	(31)

International career
1991	Republic of Ireland U17	2	(0)
1992	Republic of Ireland U19	?	(1)
1993	Republic of Ireland U21	5	(0)
- * Club domestic league appearances and goals

Tony Sheridan (born 21 October 1974) is an Irish retired footballer.

== Career ==
Sheridan signed for Coventry City in 1991 and made his Premier League debut at Elland Road on 31 October 1992. After a further 8 appearances in the 1993–94 FA Premier League season Sheridan returned home to sign for Shelbourne in August 1995.

During Sheridan's first season with Shels he helped them win both the League of Ireland Cup and the FAI Cup. In the semi-final against Sligo Rovers, he scored the only goal of the game, a majestic lob after running with the ball from box to box and he scored a late equaliser in the cup final at Lansdowne Road when Shels were down to ten men and with no regular goalkeeper. In the cup final replay at Dalymount Park he scored the equaliser and Shels went on to win 2–1 to deny St Patrick's Athletic the league and cup 'double'. Sheridan was acclaimed man of the match in both the drawn match and the replay by the media.

The following season, Sheridan again helped Shels to FAI Cup success as they defeated league champions Derry City 2–0 in the cup final. Once again, he won the man of the match award.

Disappointment followed in 1997/98 as Shels missed out on the league title on the last day of the season, and lost the FAI Cup Final to Cork City.

Damien Richardson left the managerial hotseat at Tolka Park as a result of the failure to win the championship and in came the uncompromising Dermot Keely. Despite an excellent season under Keely, Sheridan was allowed to sign for Portadown in the Irish League at the start of the 1999/2000 season. At the start of the 2000/2001 season he signed for Cardiff City but was released without playing a first team game.

Sheridan returned for a couple of brief spells with the Reds and also played for Dublin City before signing for Glenavon F.C. in 2003 . After a spell in the Leinster Senior League (association football) he briefly returned to League of Ireland football in 2005, when Roddy Collins signed him for Shamrock Rovers mid-season. Tony scored a dream goal on his debut at Bray Wanderers on Sunday 31 July and went on to record 16 league appearances scoring another goal against Bohemians with his first touch on Friday 2 September. In total he made 17 appearances for the Hoops but could not prevent Rovers from suffering relegation at the hands of Dublin City.

He played for the Republic of Ireland national under-19 football team in the qualifiers for the 1993 UEFA European Under-18 Football Championship and scored against Romania in October 1992 at the RDS Arena.
