= Austhorpe Hall =

Coordinates: 53.80216°N 1.43995°W

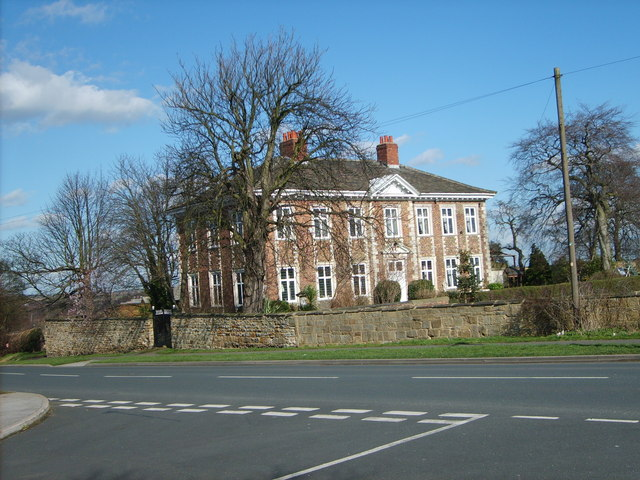
- Austhorpe Hall in 2007
- Interactive map of the Austhorpe Hall area

General information
- Type: House
- Classification: Grade II*
- Location: Austhorpe, United Kingdom
- Opened: 1694

Technical details
- Material: Red brick

Austhorpe Hall is a house built in 1694 at Austhorpe, Leeds, West Yorkshire, England. It is a grade II* listed building.

The house is of red brick with contrasting stone quoins, seven bays and three storeys, with a triangular pediment over the Baroque doorway. Pevsner describes it as "A remarkably early case of acceptance of the classical idiom". Linstrum notes that it was built in 'an unusually sophisticated design'.

== History ==
The house was built for John More (1655–1702). A coal mine on the estate was equipped in 1740 by John Calley, with an early Newcomen steam engine, only the fourth to be built. Calley, Newcomen's business partner, died at Austhorpe during maintenance work on the engine.

The house was occupied by the Pallisers from 1762 to 1769, by John Atkinson in 1722 and by Joseph Fields in 1826 (to at least 1837). The Appleyard family lived in Austhorpe Hall for over 90 years, and moved out in 1936 to a new build in Austhorpe. It was in the possession of Chapman family from 1939 to c. 2012. It was then sold for £500,000. In 2004 local archaeologists excavated in its grounds and found apparent remains of a prehistoric round barrow and indications of Roman defences on the site.

== See also ==
- Grade II* listed buildings in Leeds
- Listed buildings in Leeds (Cross Gates and Whinmoor Ward)
