= Austhorpe =

Civil parish and suburb of Leeds, West Yorkshire, England

Coordinates: 53.7985°N 1.4411°W

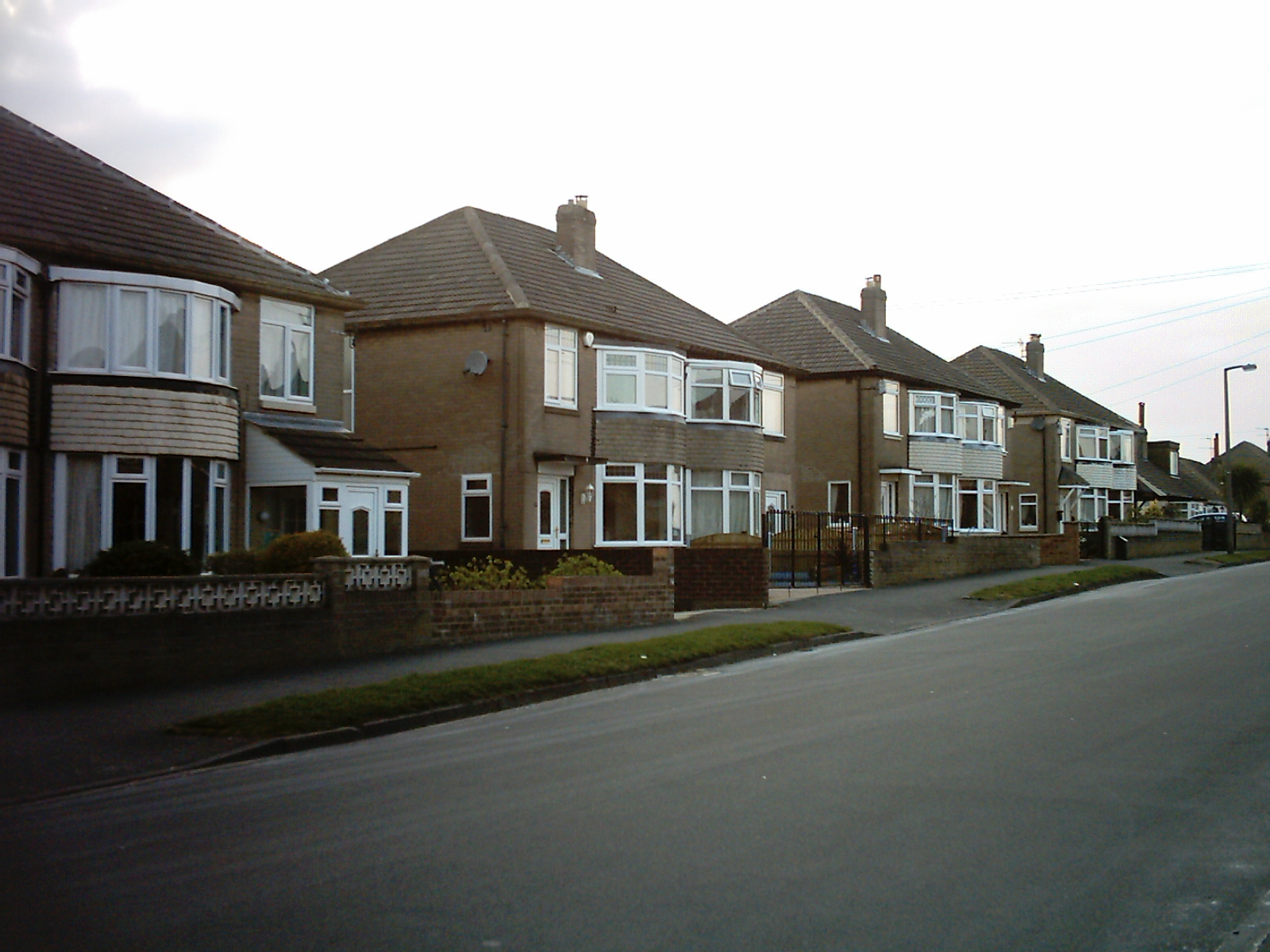
- Housing on Kingswear Crescent

- Location within West Yorkshire
- Civil parish: Austhorpe
- Metropolitan borough: City of Leeds
- Metropolitan county: West Yorkshire
- Region: Yorkshire and the Humber
- Country: England
- Sovereign state: United Kingdom
- Post town: LEEDS
- Postcode district: LS15
- Dialling code: 0113
- Police: West Yorkshire
- Fire: West Yorkshire
- Ambulance: Yorkshire
- UK Parliament: Leeds East

Austhorpe is a civil parish and residential suburb of east Leeds, West Yorkshire, England. It is 5 miles (8 km) to the east of city centre and close to the A6120 dual carriageway (Leeds Outer Ring Road) and the M1 motorway.

== Location ==
The area is situated between Pendas Fields to the north, Cross Gates to the north west, Whitkirk to the west, Colton to the south and Garforth to the east.

Officially judging by the old boundaries of the former Austhorpe township, Austhorpe also includes the areas of Cross Gates, Colton Common and Barrowby. Colton Common became officially part of Colton when the Ingram family of Temple Newsam kept it for their own after buying and then selling the rest of the Austhorpe Lodge estate. It crosses both of the Cross Gates and Whinmoor (including Austhorpe Hall) and Temple Newsam wards of Leeds City Council.

The current east half of the civil parish of Austhorpe and large Thorpe Park business park lie in the western tip of Garforth and Swillington ward. Austhorpe Parish Council declared nil balance accounts for the financial year ended 31 March 2017.

Austhorpe lies in the LS15 postcode area. At the 2011 Census, the population of Austhorpe was shown to be included in Cross Gates and Whinmoor ward.

== Etymology ==
The name Austhorpe is first attested in the Domesday Book in the form Ossetorp. Like a significant number of Yorkshire place-names, the name comes from Old Norse. The first element is from Old Norse austr ('east') and the second from Old Norse þorp ('outlying farmstead, secondary settlement'), an element found widely in the area (in names such as Osmandthorpe and Thorp Arch).

Meanwhile, the place-name Barrowby, found within the township of Austhorpe, is first attested in 1236, in the form Bergeby. The name comes from Old Norse berg ('hill') and bý ('farmstead, village').

== History ==
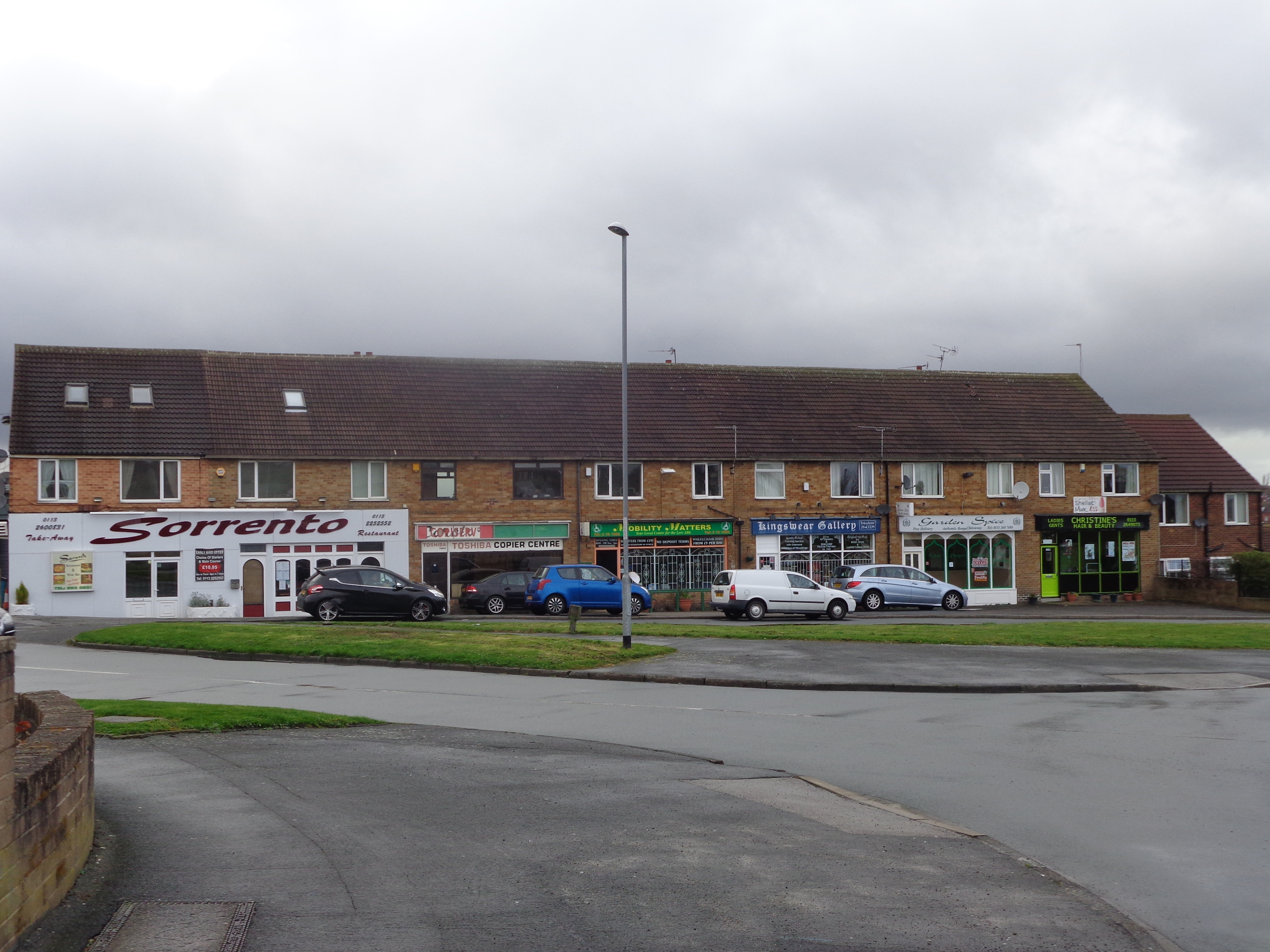
Shops, Kingswear Parade

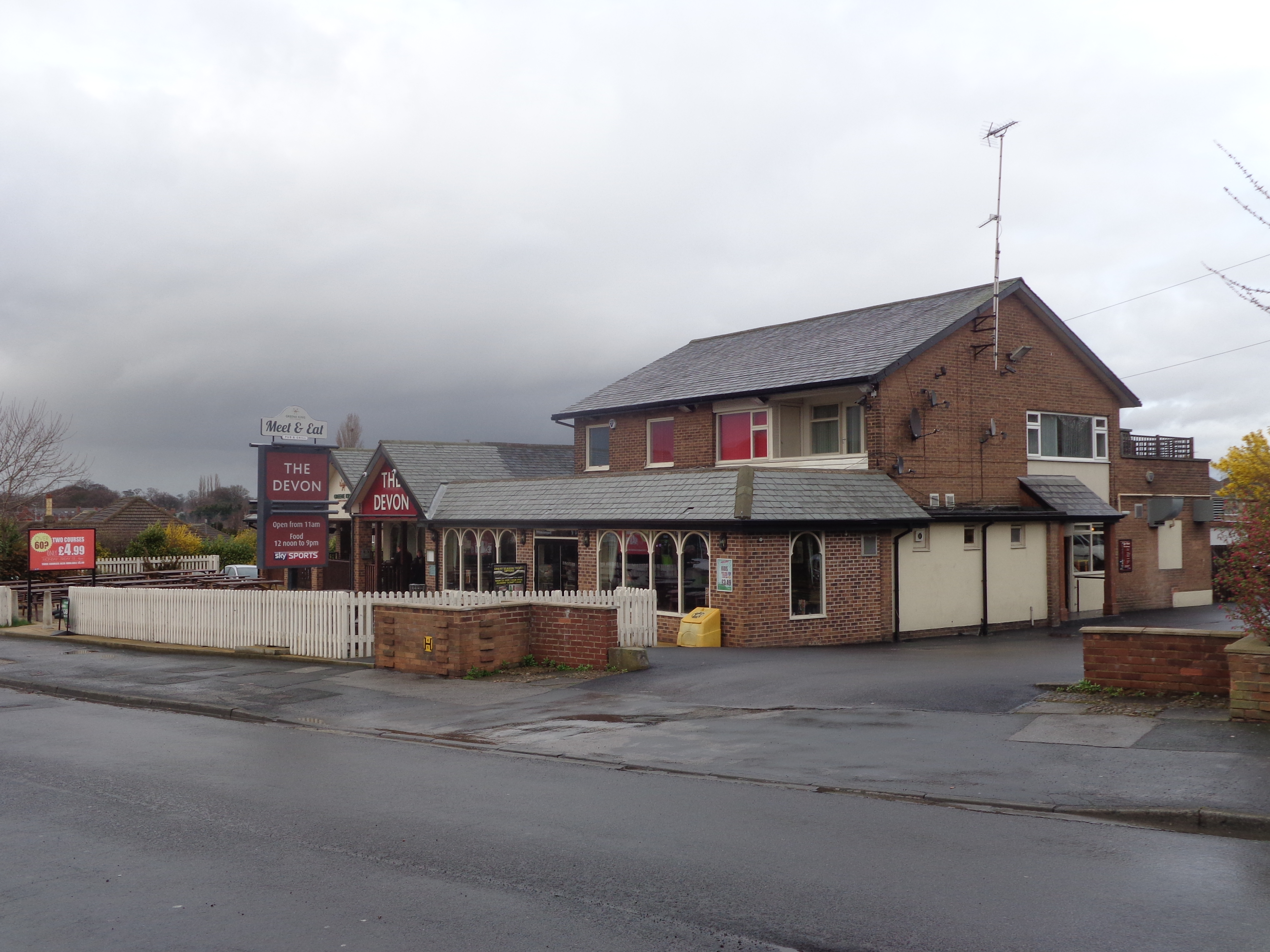
The Devon Pub

After the Township dissolved, Austhorpe stopped developing as quickly as it was doing, possibly due to the once abundant coal fields close to the surface which had been a major source of commerce for the area since Roman times becoming empty with deep shaft mining proving to be unsuccessful compared to the close by coal source at Garforth. Whereas Cross Gates and Colton quickly developed, Barrowby, if anything, did not develop.

Pioneering Civil Engineer John Smeaton, designer of the longest standing Eddystone Lighthouse, was born in Austhorpe. Leeds band the Kaiser Chiefs make a positive reference to him in their hit song "I Predict a Riot".

Austhorpe Hall is a grade II* listed building dated from 1694.

== See also ==
- Austhorpe Hall
- Cross Gates
- Colton, Leeds
- John Smeaton
