= Craig Mahon =

Irish footballer (born 1989)

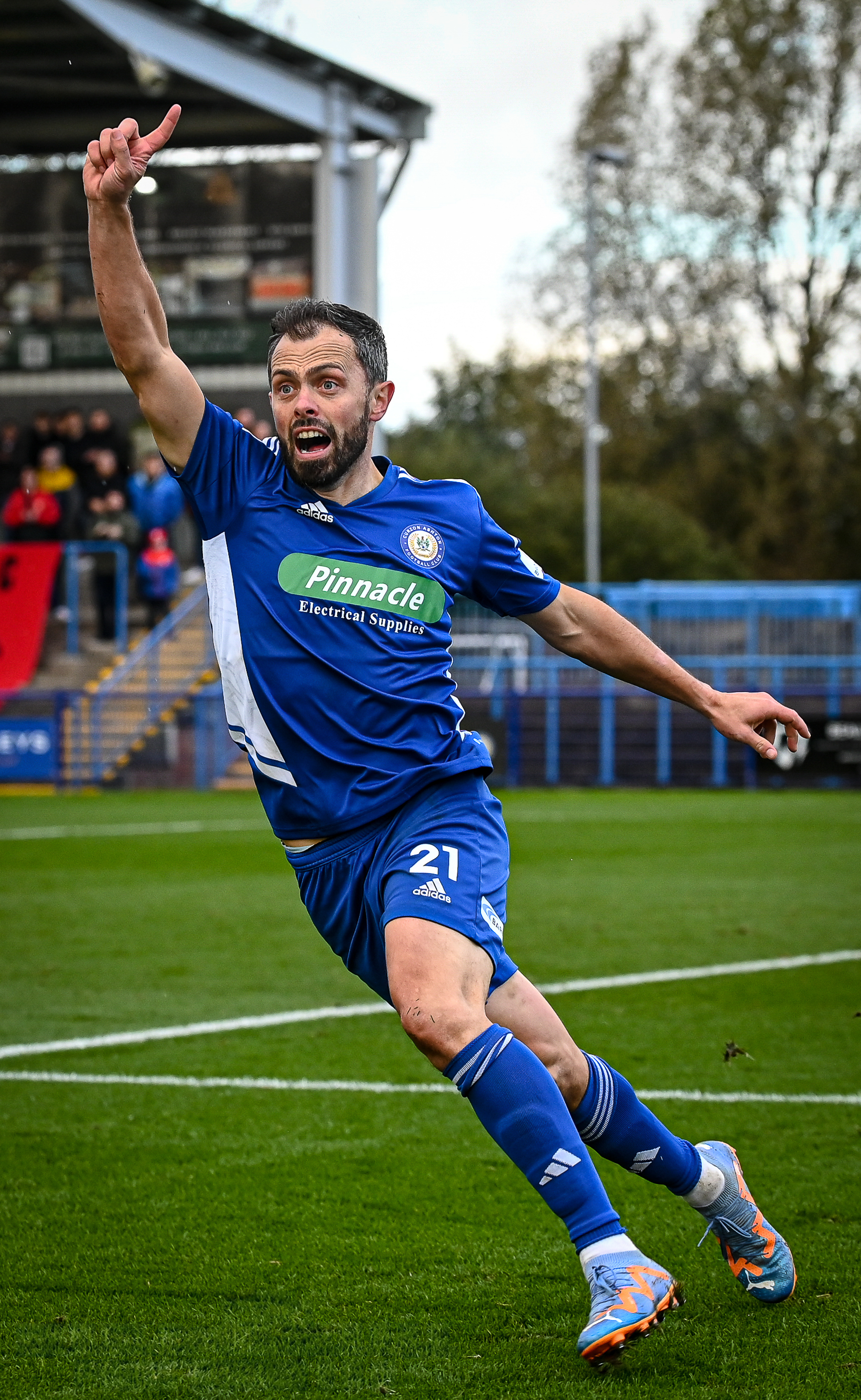
- Mahon in 2023

Personal information
- Full name: Craig Derek Mahon
- Date of birth: 21 June 1989 (age 37)
- Place of birth: Dublin, Ireland
- Height: 1.73 m (5 ft 8 in)
- Position: Winger

Team information
- Current team: AFC Fylde (manager)

Youth career
- Lourdes Celtic
- 2006–2008: Wigan Athletic

Senior career*
| Years | Team | Apps | (Gls) |
| 2008–2009 | Wigan Athletic | 0 | (0) |
| 2008 | → Accrington Stanley (loan) | 2 | (0) |
| 2009–2010 | Salford City | 15 | (5) |
| 2010 | Burscough | 19 | (9) |
| 2010–2013 | Vauxhall Motors | 117 | (7) |
| 2013–2020 | Chester | 215 | (16) |
| 2013 | → AFC Fylde (loan) | 6 | (0) |
| 2019–2020 | → Ashton United (loan) | 4 | (0) |
| 2020 | Altrincham | 8 | (0) |
| 2020–2025 | Curzon Ashton | 170 | (13) |
| Total | | 556 | (50) |

International career
| 2007 | Republic of Ireland U18 | 2 | (0) |
| 2007–2008 | Republic of Ireland U19 | 3 | (0) |

Managerial career
- 2021: Curzon Ashton (interim)
- 2023–2025: Curzon Ashton
- 2025–: AFC Fylde
- * Club domestic league appearances and goals as of 13:06, 25 May 2025 (UTC)

Craig Derek Mahon (born 21 June 1989) is an Irish former footballer who played as a winger. He currently manages National League club AFC Fylde. He has played in the Football League for Accrington Stanley.

== Early life ==
Craig Derek Mahon was born on 21 June 1989 in Dublin.

== Club career ==
=== Early career ===
Mahon's footballing education took place at the Dublin-based club Lourdes Celtic, from there he signed as trainee in the 2006–07 season at Wigan Athletic he then progressed through the ranks. He signed a one-year professional contract with Wigan in June 2008.

Mahon signed for Accrington Stanley on loan in the 2008–09 season. He made his debut on 29 November 2008 in a League Two match against Bury, which ended in a 2–1 home defeat for Accrington.

In the summer of 2009, he was released by Wigan and went on to have a short spells with Salford City and Burscough.

After trials at Football League clubs Bury and Rochdale, Mahon signed for Conference North club Vauxhall Motors on 4 September 2010. He signed a further one-year contract on 26 July 2011. The club secured the services of Mahon on a further one-year contract on 27 July 2012. He was voted the Vauxhall Motors Player of the Season for the 2012–13 season.

=== Chester ===
Mahon signed for Conference Premier club Chester on 23 May 2013. First season at Chester included time on loan at the Northern Premier League side AFC Fylde. At the end of the season he agreed new deal.

On 7 November 2014, Mahon became the father of twins. The following day Mahon was back on the pitch playing for Chester against Football League team Southend United in the FA Cup first round. Mahon had further cause for celebration by scoring the winning goal in the 51st minute, the match ending 2–1 to Chester as they pulled off a surprise victory against higher-ranked opponents. He signed a new two-year contract in April 2015 though his displays in the FA Cup drew attention from Football League scouts.

Mahon signed further two-year deal in May 2017 and stayed with Chester despite financial troubles hit the club and relegation to the National League North in April 2018.

At the end of May 2019 Mahon extended his stay at Chester to seventh year. He was loaned out to Northern Premier League side Ashton United in December, before signing for Altrincham in January 2020.

On 12 September 2017, Mahon broke the all-time appearance record for Chester and went on to make 215 league appearances during his seven-year stay with the club.

=== Later career ===
He was part of the Altrincham team that beat Chester in the play-off quarterfinals and eventually were promoted to the National League on 1 August 2020 after beating Boston United 1–0 in the final.

Mahon signed for National League North club Curzon Ashton in September 2020. He signed a further one-year contract as a player-coach in August 2021. In October, he took the role of interim manager for three games, whilst the club recruited a new manager. In September 2023, he was appointed interim manager for a second time following the departure of Adam Lakeland. On 8 February 2024, Craig was offered the Management role on permanent deal until June 2025.

== International career ==
Mahon represented the Republic of Ireland at youth level, making his debut for the under-18 team on 7 February 2007 in a 0–0 draw against the Netherlands. He appeared for the under-19 team later in the year, playing in a 2–1 defeat against Chile.

== Management career ==
On 13 June 2025, Mahon departed Curzon Ashton, joining recently relegated National League North club AFC Fylde as head coach. He led the team to an immediate return to the National League in his first season in charge, a 4–2 win over Merthyr Town on the final day of the 2025–26 season seeing the Coasters crowned Champions.

== Personal life ==
Craig Mahon is a nephew of a former Tranmere Rovers midfielder Alan Mahon. During the time with Chester he combined his playing career with work at Wigan Athletic Community Trust.

== Career statistics ==
As of match played 26 April 2025

Appearances and goals by club, season and competition
| Club | Season | League | | | FA Cup | | EFL Cup | | Other | | Total | |
| Club | Season | Division | Apps | Goals | Apps | Goals | Apps | Goals | Apps | Goals | Apps | Goals |
|---|---|---|---|---|---|---|---|---|---|---|---|---|
| Wigan Athletic | 2008–09 | Premier League | 0 | 0 | 0 | 0 | 0 | 0 | 0 | 0 | 0 | 0 |
| Accrington Stanley (loan) | 2008–09 | League Two | 2 | 0 | 0 | 0 | 0 | 0 | 0 | 0 | 2 | 0 |
| Salford City | 2009–10 | NPL Division One North | 15 | 5 | 3 | 1 | — | | 6 (Note: Four appearances and two goals in FA Trophy, one appearance in President's Cup, one appearance in Manchester Premier Cup) | 2 | 24 | 8 |
| Burscough | 2009–10 | NPL Premier Division | 9 | 3 | — | | — | | 0 | 0 | 9 | 3 |
| Burscough | 2010–11 | NPL Premier Division | 10 | 6 | — | | — | | 0 | 0 | 10 | 6 |
| Burscough | Total | | 19 | 9 | — | | — | | 0 | 0 | 19 | 9 |
| Vauxhall Motors | 2010–11 | Conference North | 35 | 3 | 6 | 0 | — | | 1 (Note: Appearance(s) in FA Trophy) | 0 | 42 | 3 |
| Vauxhall Motors | 2011–12 | Conference North | 41 | 4 | 2 | 1 | — | | 3 | 0 | 46 | 5 |
| Vauxhall Motors | 2012–13 | Conference North | 41 | 0 | 1 | 0 | — | | 1 | 0 | 43 | 0 |
| Vauxhall Motors | Total | | 117 | 7 | 9 | 1 | — | | 5 | 0 | 131 | 8 |
| Chester | 2013–14 | Conference Premier | 27 | 3 | 0 | 0 | — | | 2 (Note: One appearance in FA Trophy, one appearance in Cheshire Senior Cup) | 0 | 29 | 3 |
| Chester | 2014–15 | Conference Premier | 44 | 6 | 4 | 1 | — | | 2 | 0 | 50 | 7 |
| Chester | 2015–16 | National League | 39 | 1 | 1 | 0 | — | | 4 (Note: Three appearances in FA Trophy, one appearance in Cheshire Senior Cup) | 0 | 44 | 1 |
| Chester | 2016–17 | National League | 25 | 1 | 1 | 0 | — | | 1 | 0 | 27 | 1 |
| Chester | 2017–18 | National League | 32 | 1 | 0 | 0 | — | | 1 | 0 | 33 | 1 |
| Chester | 2018–19 | National League North | 40 | 4 | 2 | 0 | — | | 4 (Note: Two appearances in FA Trophy, Two appearances and one goal in Cheshire Senior Cup) | 1 | 46 | 5 |
| Chester | 2019–20 | National League North | 8 | 0 | 1 | 0 | — | | 1 (Note: Appearance(s) in Cheshire Senior Cup) | 0 | 10 | 0 |
| Chester | Total | | 215 | 16 | 9 | 1 | — | | 15 | 1 | 239 | 18 |
| AFC Fylde (loan) | 2013–14 | NPL Premier Division | 6 | 0 | — | | — | | 0 | 0 | 6 | 0 |
| Ashton United (loan) | 2019–20 | NPL Premier Division | 4 | 0 | — | | — | | 0 | 0 | 4 | 0 |
| Altrincham | 2019–20 | National League North | 8 | 0 | — | | — | | 3 (Note: Appearance(s) in National League North play-offs) | 0 | 11 | 0 |
| Curzon Ashton | 2020–21 | National League North | 17 | 1 | 1 | 0 | — | | 1 | 0 | 19 | 1 |
| Curzon Ashton | 2021–22 | National League North | 41 | 2 | 3 | 0 | — | | 2 | 0 | 46 | 2 |
| Curzon Ashton | 2022–23 | National League North | 46 | 3 | 6 | 0 | — | | 2 | 0 | 54 | 3 |
| Curzon Ashton | 2023–24 | National League North | 39 | 7 | 4 | 0 | — | | 6 (Note: Two appearances in FA Trophy, three appearances in Manchester Premier Cup, one appearance in National League North play-offs) | 0 | 49 | 7 |
| Curzon Ashton | 2024–25 | National League North | 27 | 0 | 4 | 0 | — | | 4 (Note: One appearance in FA Trophy, three appearances in Manchester Premier Cup) | 0 | 35 | 0 |
| Curzon Ashton | Total | | 170 | 13 | 18 | 0 | — | | 15 | 0 | 203 | 13 |
| Career total | | | 556 | 46 | 39 | 3 | 0 | 0 | 44 | 3 | 595 | 56 |

== Managerial statistics ==
As of match played 21 November 2026

Managerial record by team and tenure
| Team | From | To | Record | | | | | Ref |
| Team | From | To | P | W | D | L | Win % | Ref |
|---|---|---|---|---|---|---|---|---|
| Curzon Ashton (interim) | 19 October 2021 | 28 October 2021 | 1 | 0 | 1 | 0 | 0.0 | |
| Curzon Ashton (interim) | 28 September 2023 | 8 February 2024 | 29 | 15 | 5 | 9 | 51.7 | |
| Curzon Ashton | 8 February 2024 | 13 June 2025 | 72 | 34 | 18 | 20 | 47.2 | |
| AFC Fylde | 13 June 2025 | Present | 74 | 46 | 10 | 18 | 62.2 | |
| Total | | | 176 | 95 | 34 | 47 | 54.0 | |

== Honours ==
=== As a player ===
Altrincham

- National League North play-offs: 2020

=== As a manager ===
AFC Fylde

- National League North: 2025–26
