= Cross Gates and Whinmoor =

Electoral ward in Leeds, England

- Cross Gates and Whinmoor highlighted within Leeds
- Population: 18,287 (2023 electorate)
- Metropolitan borough: City of Leeds
- Metropolitan county: West Yorkshire
- Region: Yorkshire and the Humber
- Country: England
- Sovereign state: United Kingdom
- UK Parliament: Leeds East
- Councillors: James Gibson (Labour); Vacant; Jessica Lennox (Independent (Note: Elected as Labour))

Cross Gates and Whinmoor is an electoral ward of Leeds City Council in east Leeds, West Yorkshire, covering the outer city suburb areas of Cross Gates, Manston, Swarcliffe and Whinmoor. Austhorpe is also shared with Temple Newsam ward to the south.

== Councillors ==
Election	Councillor	Councillor	Councillor
2004	Suzi Armitage (Lab) (Note: Armitage had been a councillor for Whinmoor ward since 1988.)	Pauleen Grahame (Lab) (Note: Grahame had been a councillor for Whinmoor ward since 2002.)	Peter Gruen (Lab) (Note: Gruen had been a Conservative councillor for Roundhay ward from 1983 to 1995 and, after switching parties, became a Labour councillor for Whinmoor ward after a 1997 by-election to replace Elaine Pickard.)
2006	Suzi Armitage (Lab)	Pauleen Grahame (Lab)	Peter Gruen (Lab)
2007	Suzi Armitage (Lab)	Pauleen Grahame (Lab)	Peter Gruen (Lab)
2008	Suzi Armitage (Lab)	Pauleen Grahame (Lab)	Peter Gruen (Lab)
2010	Suzi Armitage (Lab)	Pauleen Grahame (Lab)	Peter Gruen (Lab)
2011	Suzi Armitage (Lab)	Pauleen Grahame (Lab)	Peter Gruen (Lab)
2012	Suzi Armitage (Lab)	Pauleen Grahame (Lab)	Peter Gruen (Lab)
2013 by-election	Debra Coupar (Lab) (Note: The by-election was called following the death of Suzi Armitage in February 2013. Coupar, a former councillor for Middleton Park and Morley South wards, replaced Armitage as the Labour candidate.)	Pauleen Grahame (Lab)	Peter Gruen (Lab)
2014	Debra Coupar (Lab)	Pauleen Grahame (Lab)	Peter Gruen (Lab)
2015	Debra Coupar (Lab) (Note: For the next election in 2016, Coupar did not seek re-selection as the Labour candidate for the ward, standing successfully as their candidate for Temple Newsam ward.)	Pauleen Grahame (Lab)	Peter Gruen (Lab)
2016	Janette Walker (Lab) (Note: Walker had been a councillor for Headingley ward since 2012.)	Pauleen Grahame (Lab)	Peter Gruen (Lab)
February 2017	Janette Walker (ELI) (Note: Walker resigned the Labour whip to run under a new East Leeds Independents banner at the upcoming 2018 election. The Yorkshire Evening Post quoted Walker saying, "there is a toxic atmosphere of mistrust, bullying, cronyism, whispers and unfairness endemic within the controlling elite of the Leeds Labour Group" and it had forced her decision. At the time, she was subject to an internal group disciplinary investigation "over inappropriate social media postings" and her claims were dismissed by the group as “completely fanciful”. Walker stated "she was facing “sanctions” for publicly criticising fellow councillors who had failed to pay their council tax”.)	Pauleen Grahame (Lab)	Peter Gruen (Lab)
2018	Jessica Lennox (Lab)	Pauleen Grahame (Lab)	Peter Gruen (Lab)
2019	Jessica Lennox (Lab)	Pauleen Grahame (Lab)	Peter Gruen (Lab)
2021	Jessica Lennox (Lab)	Pauleen Grahame (Lab)	James Gibson (Lab) (Note: Gibson was previously a councillor for Weetwood ward from 2018 to 2019.)
2022	Jessica Lennox (Lab)	Pauleen Grahame (Lab)	James Gibson (Lab)
2023	Jessica Lennox (Lab)	Pauleen Grahame (Lab)	James Gibson (Lab)
2024	Jessica Lennox (Lab)	Pauleen Grahame (Lab)	James Gibson (Lab)
2026	Jessica Lennox (Ind) (Note: Shortly after the 2026 local elections, Cllr Lennox resigned the Labour whip and subsequently sat as an independent.)	Paula Jane-Thackray (RUK)	James Gibson (Lab)
October 2026	Jessica Lennox (Ind)	Paula Jane-Thackray (LFI) (Note: In October 2026, Cllr Thackray sat as part of the Leeds First Independents group prior to her resignation from the council later that month.)	James Gibson (Lab)
October 2026	Jessica Lennox* (Ind)	Vacant	James Gibson* (Lab)

indicates seat up for re-election. indicates seat up for election following resignation or death of sitting councillor. indicates councillor defection. * indicates incumbent councillor.

== Elections since 2010 ==
=== December 2026 by-election ===
10 December 2026 Resignation of Paula-Jane Thackray (Independent)
Party	Candidate	Votes	%	±%
Liberal Democrats	Noah Allerton			
Restore	Victoria Bowen			
Yorkshire	Howard Dews			
Conservative	Rosemary Gaskell			
SDP	Michael Hunter			
Reform	James Kendall			
Labour	Luke Murrow			
Independent	Mark Nicholson			
Green	Colin Noble			
Majority				
Turnout				
		Swing		

=== May 2026 ===
2026
Party	Candidate	Votes	%	±%
Reform	Paula-Jane Thackray	3,013	41.0	▲32.4
Labour	Luke Murrow	2,051	27.9	▼25.3
Conservative	John Kennedy	902	12.3	▼9.3
Green	Martin Francis Hemingway	706	9.6	▲4.1
Liberal Democrats	Joshua Patrick Lowthion	260	3.5	▼1.8
Independent	Mark Nicholson	223	3.0	New
Yorkshire	Howard Graham Dews	157	2.1	▼3.7
SDP	Paul Anthony Whetstone	14	0.2	New
TUSC	Ali Mansfield	11	0.1	New
Majority		962	13.1	▼18.5
Turnout		7,352	40.6	▲10.6
Rejected ballots		5	0.1	
Registered electors		18,116		
Reform gain from Labour		Swing	▲28.9	

=== May 2024 ===
2024
Party	Candidate	Votes	%	±%
Labour	James Gibson*	2,865	53.2	−0.4
Conservative	Max Holley	1,164	21.6	−7.9
Reform	Graham Sunley	461	8.6	New
Yorkshire	Howard Dews	314	5.8	New
Green	Martin Hemingway	296	5.5	−0.2
Liberal Democrats	Noah Allerton	288	5.3	+0.9
Majority		1,701	31.6	+2.8
Turnout		5,418	30.0	+1.2
Labour hold		Swing	+3.8	

=== May 2023 ===
2023
Party	Candidate	Votes	%	±%
Labour	Jess Lennox*	2,823	53.6	+2.4
Conservative	John Kennedy	1,557	29.5	−4.4
Independent	Mark Nicholson	339	6.4	N/A
Green	Martin Hemingway	302	5.7	−1.3
Liberal Democrats	Patricia Cooper	233	4.4	−3.0
Majority		1,266	24.0	+6.7
Turnout		5,271	28.8	−2.0
Labour hold		Swing		

=== May 2022 ===
2022
Party	Candidate	Votes	%	±%
Labour	Pauleen Grahame*	2,915	51.2	+7.9
Conservative	John Kennedy	1,929	33.9	−7.3
Liberal Democrats	Benjamin Wood	421	7.4	+5.2
Green	Martin Hemingway	401	7.0	+1.2
Majority		986	17.3	+15.2
Turnout		5,688	30.8	−4.4
Labour hold		Swing		

=== May 2021 ===
2021
Party	Candidate	Votes	%	±%
Labour	James Gibson	2,826	43.3	−0.5
Conservative	Philip Moore	2,687	41.2	+20.4
Green	Keith Hale	378	5.8	−2.4
Independent	Mark Nicholson	286	4.4	N/A
UKIP	Harvey Alexander	157	2.4	−17.7
Liberal Democrats	Aqila Choudhry	145	2.2	−3.8
SDP	Jack Newcombe	21	0.0	−1.2
Majority		139	2.1	−20.9
Turnout		6,530	35.2	+8.8
Labour hold		Swing		

=== May 2019 ===
2019
Party	Candidate	Votes	%	±%
Labour	Jessica Lennox*	2,095	43.8	+7.4
Conservative	Paula Hayes	995	20.8	+1.6
UKIP	Harvey Alexander	960	20.1	+12.9
Green	Ben Goldthorp	391	8.2	+1.6
Liberal Democrats	Roderic Parker	286	6.0	+1.6
SDP	David Creasser	58	1.2	+1.2
Majority		1,100	23.0	+6.3
Turnout		4,823	26.4	−5.4
Labour hold		Swing	+2.9	

=== May 2018 ===
2018
Party	Candidate	Votes	%	±%
Labour	Pauline Grahame*	2,815	36.4	−12.2
Labour	Peter Gruen*	2,501		
Labour	Jessica Lennox	2,175		
East Leeds Independents	Janette Walker*	1,525	19.7	N/A
Conservative	Dorothy Schofield	1,485	19.2	+1.6
Conservative	Paula Hayes	1,340		
Conservative	Andrew Martin	1,142		
Green	Elizabeth Fellows	557		
UKIP	Harvey Alexander	519	7.2	−18.0
UKIP	Peter Morgan	414		
Liberal Democrats	Thomas Shakespeare	340	4.4	+0
Democrats and Veterans	Mark Maniatt	261	3.4	N/A
For Britain	Stuart Nicholson	238	3.1	N/A
Majority		1,290	16.7	−6.7
Turnout		18,247	31.8	−0.6
Labour hold		Swing		
Labour hold		Swing		
Labour hold		Swing		

=== May 2016 ===
2016
Party	Candidate	Votes	%	±%
Labour	Janette Walker	2,789	48.6	+2.8
UKIP	Mark Maniatt	1,446	25.2	+3.6
Conservative	Matthew Gale	1,088	18.8	−5.6
Liberal Democrats	Kate Langwick	245	4.3	+0.6
Green	Florence Scott	165	3.1	−1.4
Majority		1,343	23.4	+2.0
Turnout		5,733	32.4	
Labour hold		Swing		

=== May 2015 ===
2015
Party	Candidate	Votes	%	±%
Labour	Pauleen Grahame*	5,012	45.8	−11.1
Conservative	David Schofield	2,669	24.4	+1.5
UKIP	Darren Oddy	2,363	21.6	+13.7
Green	Ben Goldthorpe	489	4.5	+0.6
Liberal Democrats	Kate Langwick	400	3.7	−0.5
Majority		2,343	21.4	−12.6
Turnout		10,933	61.5	
Labour hold		Swing	-6.3	

=== May 2014 ===
2014
Party	Candidate	Votes	%	±%
Labour	Peter Gruen*	2,555	44.6	
UKIP	Darren Oddy	1,808	31.6	
Conservative	Elizabeth Hayes	907	15.8	
Green	Ben Goldthorp	319	5.6	
Liberal Democrats	Richard Morris	136	2.4	
Majority		747		
Turnout		5725	33.11	
Labour hold		Swing		

=== May 2013 by-election ===
2 May 2013 replacing Suzi Armitage (deceased)
Party	Candidate	Votes	%	±%
Labour	Debra Coupar	2,481	49.4	−20.4
UKIP	Darren Oddy	1,582	31.5	+19.5
Conservative	William Flynn	587	11.7	+5.4
Green	Martin Hemingway	229	4.6	−0.1
Liberal Democrats	Keith Norman	145	2.9	−0.9
Majority		899	17.9	−39.9
Turnout		5,024		
Labour hold		Swing		

=== May 2012 ===
2012
Party	Candidate	Votes	%	±%
Labour	Suzi Armitage*	3,597	69.8	+12.9
UKIP	Darren Oddy	619	12.0	+4.1
Conservative	Dorothy Flynn	323	6.3	−16.7
Green	Ben Goldthorp	243	4.7	+0.8
Liberal Democrats	Keith Norman	195	3.8	−0.4
English Democrat	John Ashton	176	3.4	+3.4
Majority		2,978	57.8	+23.8
Turnout		5,153		
Labour hold		Swing	+4.4	

=== May 2011 ===
2011
Party	Candidate	Votes	%	±%
Labour	Pauleen Grahame*	3,653	56.9	+10.9
Conservative	Patrick Hennigan	1,472	22.9	−4.7
UKIP	Darren Oddy	510	7.9	+7.9
Liberal Democrats	Keith Norman	271	4.2	−13.7
Independent	David Hudson	257	4.0	+4.0
Green	Ben Goldthorp	253	3.9	+3.9
Majority		2,181	34.0	+15.6
Turnout		6,416	37	
Labour hold		Swing	+7.8	

=== May 2010 ===
2010
Party	Candidate	Votes	%	±%
Labour	Peter Gruen*	4,921	46.1	+9.2
Conservative	Caroline Anderson	2,955	27.7	−7.1
Liberal Democrats	Keith Norman	1,915	17.9	+9.0
BNP	Michael Mee	895	8.4	−6.8
Majority		1,966	18.4	+16.3
Turnout		10,686	62.1	+24.1
Labour hold		Swing	+8.1	

== See also ==
- Listed buildings in Leeds (Cross Gates and Whinmoor Ward)
