= John Paul Kelly =

John Paul Kelly may refer to:

- John Paul Kelly (football) (born 1987), Irish footballer
- John-Paul Kelly (ice hockey) (born 1959), Canadian ice hockey player
- J. P. Kelly, English professional poker player
