= Maurice Price (football coach) =

Irish footballer and coach (1938–2021)

Personal information
- Full name: Maurice Price
- Date of birth: 1938
- Place of birth: Dublin, Ireland
- Date of death: 1 November 2021 (aged 83)
- Place of death: Dublin, Ireland

Youth career
- Lourdes Celtic
- Shamrock Rovers

Senior career*
Years	Team	Apps	(Gls)
- Shamrock Rovers
	Coventry City	0	(0)
- * Club domestic league appearances and goals

Maurice Price (1938 – 1 November 2021) was an Irish footballer and coach. During a lengthy career he held coaching jobs at Bohemians, St Patrick's Athletic and Dundalk, and was part of the Republic of Ireland coaching team at two FIFA World Cups.

== Career ==
Born in Crumlin, Price began his playing career at youth level with Shamrock Rovers and earned a move to Coventry City but left without a first-team appearance. He had subsequent spells as a player in England with non-league sides VS Rugby, Rugby Town and Leamington. Upon his return to Ireland in 1974 he began his coaching career in Dublin's schoolboy scene and was first hired to work at international level, with the youths side, in 1979. Brian Kerr brought Price to St Patrick's Athletic, as his assistant, in 1986. He then established a successful working relationship with Eamonn Gregg with Kilkenny City and Bohemians, winning the FAI Cup with the latter in 1992. By then, Price had become part of Jack Charlton's coaching staff with the national team and was part of the coaching team for the FIFA World Cups in 1990 and 2002 under manager Mick McCarthy. He also managed the Republic of Ireland youth teams for a period of time after the departure of Maurice Setters.

== Death ==
Price died at St. James's Hospital in Dublin on 1 November 2021, aged 83. He was predeceased by his wife and is survived by his four children.
