= Lourdes Celtic F.C. =

Lourdes Celtic
- Full name: Lourdes Celtic Football Club
- Founded: 1957
- Ground: Eamonn Ceannt Park
- League: Dublin District Schools League (DDSL)
- Website: https://www.lourdesceltic.ie/home
Home colours	Away colours

Lourdes Celtic Football Club is an association football club based in Crumlin, Dublin. They are a predominantly a schoolboys/Schoolgirls club but also have the longest running and largest Football For All section (FFA) in Ireland. They also have a Walking football section established in 2026. Lourdes Celtic Schools teams play in the Dublin and District Schoolboys/Girls League (DDSL). A number of players, who progressed through the Lourdes Celtic youth system, have gone onto play for professional clubs in Ireland and the United Kingdom. Several have also represented the Republic of Ireland national team at international level. Lourdes Celtic also offers a pathway for our players to Leinster Senior League football through their partnership with St. James's Gate FC.

== History ==
Lourdes Celtic Football Club was established in 1957 by John 'Bower' Bradley, Liam 'Sunboy' O'Connor, Jimmy Nolan, Jimmy Addie, and later aided in their efforts by Eddie Roche. The name originates from the Lourdes Road – a local focal point in the Maryland area of Dubin 8, and a time when most football was played and organised on the streets.

The five founders, who were only just out of school themselves, recognised that football offered children in the area a sense of freedom and maybe for some an opportunity for a better life. But with only 8-9 schoolboy clubs in Dublin at the time, those opportunities were limited and particularly in the 1950s inner city. And so, out of passion for game and belief in community – Lourdes Celtic Football Club was born. Little did these men know, from humble beginnings, how famous they would make Lourdes Road in Irish football circles.

Lourdes Celtic Football Club's inaugural game was played against Annamo Rangers in the Phoenix Park – the club's first home ground. And no sign of the green and yellow just yet – instead kicking off in black and white stripes. The captain of this first Lourdes Celtic team was a boy called Tommy Doolin, who many years later became a coach at the club himself – as did two other players, Sean Gilligan and George Larkin (an occurrence that is repeated to this day). Tommy also later managed the club's first girls team.

It has to be said that Lourdes Celtic did not arrive in the park too well equipped that day, in fact they had not even got a ball. But a man that was to become a longtime member of the club came to the rescue – Sean Murphy, who again, went on later in life to manage teams at the club.

=== Community Spirit ===
From this very small beginning the club began to grow (in no small part to the diligent scouting efforts of Sunboy) and now with two teams moved to nearby Dublin 12 and Éamonn Ceannt Park, known locally as Sundrive Park. This was to become their permanent home to this day. In the 1960s, the club grew to four teams and the founders now had support in running the club from people such as Joe Smith, Sean Freeman, Harry Rogers, Johnny Garnett, Blondie O'Connor, Sean Courtney, Brian Birmingham, Joe Conroy, Jackie Jameson, and the Timmins family – who among other things carried many a football team on the back of their coal trucks.

The spirit of volunteerism was a solid foundation for the club and help was always welcome. On occasion, Manchester United player Billy Behan would lend a hand with pre-game pep talks. Lourdes Celtic was growing into a force to be reckoned with, and began to move up the Dublin & District Schoolboy League (DDSL) – a fact recognised by the great Don Revie of Leeds United who sent over some kit for the boys in return for a bit of scouting.

=== Planning for the future ===
In the 1970s Fr. Dave 'Rocker' Roughneen came to the Crumlin area. A determined community activist, he became involved in Lourdes Celtic and through his efforts, plans began for a clubhouse on Old County Road. He was not alone in his vision for the club – he had a lot of help from people such as Brian Farrell, Tommy Ronan, Tony Sheridan, and Maurice Price (who would later go on to be part of Jack Charlton's and Mick McCarthy's Republic of Ireland coaching set-up).

It was in this decade that Lourdes Celtic joined forces with Cashelvilla and this union brought John Dwyer and Pat Connelly came to the club. Both were to make a very important contributions over the next two decades.

As the club grew, so did the people needed to run it – and Lourdes Celtic required a place to hold meetings. Jimmy Graham was to come to the rescue, turning a shed in his back garden into a meeting place for Lourdes Celtic committees. Another popular place was Eddie and Pauline Roche's kitchen – one of the many contributions that Pauline and Eddie made over the years.

Others worked tirelessly on the periphery – people such as Maureen Farrell, Irene Price, Marie Courtney, Billy Walton, Ciaran and Doreen Collins, John Breen, and all the partners who had to take second place every weekend while their husbands and wives were out with Lourdes Celtic.

=== Success; On and Off the pitch ===
Meanwhile the football end of things was prospering. Now with about 14 teams, Lourdes Celtic was definitely getting things right on and off the pitch. One of the best teams that ever graced the Hill (Sundrive Park) was to come along, managed by John Bradley and Maurice Price. In 1978 they won the Triple – League, DDSL Cup, and All Ireland Cup. They also won Team of the Year as nominated by the Evening Press. Most of this team was to eventually play football professionally in either England or Ireland.

The 80s saw Lourdes Celtic open their newly built club house on Old County Road, in Crumlin. Years of hard work had finally paid off and the facility was the envy of every sports club in Dublin.

Lourdes Celtic players were also getting the recognition they deserved with Niall Quinn and Pat Scully on trial with Arsenal and Aarron Callaghan with Stoke City. It was also around this time that Dave Roughneen was to move from the area, but as in all clubs, as people move on, new people come in, including Jim Waldron, Bill Darby, Ray Jones and Tony McNally. With these new committee members, came new players too. Among them was Tony Sheridan, son of Lourdes Celtic coach Tony Sheridan Senior. 'Shero' would go on to be voted Under 18 Player of the Year and League of Ireland player of the year by the FAI. He later played top-flight football for Coventry in the UK and won League of Ireland titles for Shelbourne.

=== The Nineties: An exciting decade for football and Lourdes Celtic ===
The 1990s brought Lourdes Celtic into a new era, and a very professional attitude towards football. Committee members Paul Duffy, Bernard Keegan, Tony Merriman, Jim Waldron, Eddie Roche, and Shay L'Estrange saw the club go from strength to strength with 22 teams and a staff of full-time and part-time employees under the stewardship of another longtime member, Stephen Condron (whose father played in the very first Lourdes Celtic team). The partnership of two men in particular, Merriman and L'Estrange, would go on to see the club through the next 20 years.

The success of the Irish International team during World Cup Italia '90 and USA '94 brought a new energy to soccer in the country and Lourdes Celtic were well placed to capitalise on it. On the pitch, the 90s saw Lourdes Celtic help produce outstanding talents such as Damien Duff, Andy Reid, Niall Byrne, John Paul Kelly, and Joey O'Brien – all going on to represent their country at international level.

In the second half of the decade, the club established their academy to help develop the next generation of footballers and introduce children to the game from an early age. This investment was to pay dividends in the decades to come.

=== The girls get in on the action ===
Unlike many other clubs at the time, girls' football was now being given serious attention at Lourdes Celtic. Tony Sheridan (Senior) along with Tommy Doolin and Brian Jones established a new girls' team in the 1990s, recruiting some of the best female players from around the country – including those already playing in boys' leagues.

The team went on to win every domestic trophy available at the time and even travelled to the US to compete in tournaments. Unsurprisingly, several of the girls went on to further success including Irish Internationals Elaine O'Connor and Susan Byrne.

Not only did Sheridan establish girls' football in Lourdes Celtic, but he also brought a new level of professionalism to the fledgling women's game in Ireland.

=== Good things come in three's ===
The 2000s saw a major focus on the redevelopment of the facilities spearheaded by the continued leadership of Merriman, Roche, and L'Estrange. Phase 1 saw the redevelopment of Old County with a new outdoor astro and upgraded clubhouse facilities including offices and a boardroom.

Phase 2 was considerably more painful as it involved a two year closure of 'The Hill', the club's grass pitches within Éamonn Ceannt Park, for leveling and re-laying. But the result was a new playing surface that was the envy of clubs across the country.

Phase 3 was the biggest undertaking of all – a new all-weather astro playing surface at Sundrive. Its development took 8 years in total and was officially opened in May 2006. Lourdes Celtic now had facilities on par with the best, due in no small part to the persistence of Merriman.

The success of the redevelopment plans were matched by progress on the pitch, with the noughties seeing Lourdes Celtic win a raft of silver wear including a series of SFAI All-Ireland National trophies as well as various DDSL league titles and cups. In addition, a record number of Lourdes Celtic players went on to domestic and cross-channel careers in football.

2007 saw the beginnings of what would become the club's 'Football for All' section. A one-off game of football for children with dyspraxia quickly grew into a hugely important part of the fabric of Lourdes Celtic thanks to the dedication of Martin Mates and the support of Dyspraxia Ireland and the FAI. A striking example of the club's belief in serving all the young people of the local community.

Even with the growth and success, the family feel of the club remained just as strong to draw people back. John Courtney, former Lourdes Celtic player, Managing Director of Umbro Ireland and sponsor of football at all levels in Ireland, returned to the club to become its honorary president.

The end of the decade also saw the end of Phase 3 of the redevelopment of the club's facilities with the opening of a modern clubhouse called Sundrive Pavilion. A fantastic addition to the club and the local community of kids who it benefited.

=== A period of renewal ===
The 2010s saw much change for Lourdes Celtic Football Club. With a new committee came fresh ideas and perspectives. Dave Murtagh, who had served with Merriman and L'Estrange on the outgoing committee now took up the mantel as Chairperson – backed by some club veterans Carol Lacey, Alan Byrne, Paul Mulraney, and Phil Cascara.

2016 was a year to remember with the unusual occurrence of three U13 Lourdes Celtic teams competing for DDSL cup honours in the same age group. In addition the club had both U15s and U16s competing in DDSL finals with the U16s winning the Liam Brady Cup.

2019 also saw the re-establishment of a girls' football section. A welcome return given Lourdes Celtic's proud history of girls' football.

Further investment in the academy, and in the profile of the club itself, saw record numbers of young people joining – part of an extraordinary period of growth towards the end of the decade.

=== Recent History ===
The 2020s have brought success with the very talented 2007 age group under Brian Morgan reaching the All-Ireland final in 2023 at U16's followed by winning the Foyle Cup in 2024 and narrowly missing out on a historic treble by winning the U18 premier league, Ferrari Cup and just losing out on penalties in the LFA Youth Cup in a packed Richmond Park in 2025.

U16 Foyle Cup Champions

== Notable former players ==
=== Senior Internationals ===
Republic of Ireland

- Niall Quinn
- Damien Duff
- Joey O'Brien
- Pat Scully
- Alan Mahon
- Aidomo Emakhu
- Andy Reid
- Leon Best
- Stephen Gleeson

Republic of Ireland women's national football team

- Katie Taylor
- Elaine O'Connor
- Susan Byrne

==== Other Internationals ====
- Pico Lopes
- Stephan Negru

League of Ireland XI representatives

- Jackie Jameson
- Conor Kenna

Republic of Ireland B internationals

- Pat Scully
- Niall Quinn
- Pat Fenlon

Republic of Ireland U23 international

- Conor Kenna
- Pat Scully
- Niall Quinn
- Stephen Rice
- Paul Skinner
- Robert Duggan

Republic of Ireland U21 internationals

- Ian Bermingham
- Niall Quinn
- Stephen Bradley
- Aidomo Emakhu
- Joey O'Brien
- Alan Mahon
- Jonathan Afolabi
- Tony Sheridan
- Leon Best
- John Paul Kelly
- Pat Scully
- Aarron Callaghan
- Andy Reid
- Pat Fenlon
- Ian Morris
- Jake Mulraney
- Stephen Gleeson
- Tommy Fitzgerald
- Robbie Gibbons
- David Bracken

Republic of Ireland U19 internationals

- Ian Bermingham
- Pico Lopes
- Aidomo Emakhu
- Damien Duff
- Tony Sheridan
- Joey O'Brien
- Leon Best
- Jonathan Afolabi
- Stephen Rice
- John Paul Kelly
- Jake Mulraney
- Ian Morris
- Craig Mahon
- Rhys Brennan
- Mark Salmon

Republic of Ireland U18 internationals

- Ian Bermingham
- Aarron Callaghan
- Damien Duff
- Luke Turner
- James Doona
- Stephen Gleeson
- Craig Mahon
- Luke O'Brien

Republic of Ireland U17 internationals

- Tony Sheridan
- Niall Quinn
- David Freeman
- Leon Best
- Aarron Callaghan
- Jonathan Afolabi
- Luke Turner
- Jake Mulraney
- Stephen Gleeson
- Joe Carroll-Byrne
- David Bracken
- Paul Skinner
- Niall Byrne
- Luke O'Brien
- Stephen Quigley

Republic of Ireland U16 internationals

- Conor Kenna
- Andy Reid
- Stephen Bradley
- Luke Turner
- Stephen Rice
- John Paul Kelly
- Stephen Gleeson
- Robbie Gibbons
- Joe Carroll-Byrne
- David Bracken
- Niall Byrne
- Stephen Quigley

Republic of Ireland U15 international

- Stephen Gleeson
- Niall Byrne
- Luke O'Brien
- Blake Devereux Lynch

=== Players/Coaches who became Professional Managers/Coaches ===
- Maurice price
- Eileen gleeson
- Stephen bradley
- Pat Fenlon
- Pat Scully
- Alan Mahon
- Ian Morris
- Joey O'Brien
- Aarron Callaghan
- Damien Duff
- Dean Brennan
- Niall Quinn
- Craig Mahon
- Stephen Last
- Paul Skinner

=== PFAI Team of the Year ===
- Conor Kenna
- Stephen bradley
- Ian Bermingham
- Paul Skinner
- Graham Kelly
- Stephen Rice
- Pico Lopes
- Jonathan Afolabi
- Luke Turner
- Tony Sheridan

=== Players who excelled at other sports ===
- Katie Taylor
- Conor Mcgregor
- Graham Shaw
