= John Kelley (diplomat) =

American diplomat

John Kelley was the Acting Ambassador to the United Nations for the United States. He has a lengthy career in the U.S. Foreign Service, with a geographic focus in Africa.

== Early life and education ==
Kelley is from Washington, D.C. He is a graduate of Howard University. He then earned a Master's Degree in Public Policy from the Harvard Kennedy School of Government.

== Career ==
=== Foreign service ===
Kelley's first position in the U.S. Foreign Service was in Yaoundé, the capital city of Cameroon. He served as political officer. Next, Kelley spent five years as the Senior Multilateral Officer with the Africa Bureau for Deputy Secretary John Negroponte. In 2011, he was the Political Counselor in Juba, South Sudan, where he helped open the first U.S. embassy following formation of Africa's newest country.

From 2012 to 2016, Kelley worked for the U.S. State Department in Democratic Republic of Congo. He was a Deputy Director in the Africa Bureau's Economic and Regional Affairs Office. Kelley managed several units, including Strategic Planning & Democracy and Human Rights.

Kelley served as the Alternate Acting Ambassador to the UN for the United States as of the third week of the second Trump administration. In July 2025, he was appointed as the Acting Ambassador.

=== Acting UN Ambassador ===
Kelley advocated for reforms to the UN's peacekeeping activities to include well-defined performance standards and accountability for performance failures including those due to mismanagement, sexual exploitation, and other forms of abuse by uniformed as well as civilian UN personnel. Kelley also called for UN peace operations to establish timelines including "clear end states" and terminate missions if their mandates are unachievable. He emphasized the need for reforms so that "the Security Council is provided with regular, frank assessments and realistic recommendations – not just what it wants to hear”.

In a September 11, 2025 speech regarding chemical weapons, Kelley informed the UN Security Council that "indicators of nerve agents" had been found in samples taken by the OPCW during their visit to Syria, five months earlier.

Following the appointment of Mike Waltz as Ambassador, John Kelley resumed his prior role as Political Counselor to the US Mission to the UN in October 2025.

On November 10, 2025, Kelley explained the US vote against UN General Assembly Fourth Committee Resolutions A (on "combatting 'misinformation' or 'disinformation'") and B (on Agenda 2030).
