= John Kelly (footballer, born 1909) =

English footballer

Personal information
- Full name: John Kelly
- Date of birth: 1909
- Place of birth: England
- Position: Inside forward

Senior career*
Years	Team	Apps	(Gls)
- Durham City
1930–1931	York City	6	(4)
1931–1932	Yorkshire Amateur		
1932–1934	York City	0	(0)
1934–1935	Yorkshire Amateur		
Total		6	(4)
- * Club domestic league appearances and goals

John Kelly (1909 – ?) was an English professional footballer who played as an inside forward in the Football League for York City, and in non-League football for Durham City and Yorkshire Amateur.
