= John F. Kelly (professor) =

US-based researcher and professor

- Citizenship: United States; United Kingdom
- Occupations: Researcher; professor; author; speaker

John F. Kelly is an American-based researcher and professor of addiction medicine at Harvard Medical School. He is the Founder and Director of the Massachusetts General Hospital Recovery Research Institute, Associate Director of the MGH Center for Addiction Medicine, and Program Director of the MGH Addiction Recovery Management Service.

== Education ==
Kelly obtained his bachelor's degree in psychology from Tufts University and doctorate at the University of California, San Diego in clinical psychology.

== Career ==
In 2006 Kelly was named the Elizabeth R. Spallin Professor of Psychiatry in Addiction Medicine at Harvard Medical School. In 2013, he established The Recovery Research Institute, which is a part of the Massachusetts General Hospital Department of Psychiatry. This institute is credited for its creation of the Addictionary, a glossary of addiction-related terms and a system for stigmatized terminology alerts.

Kelly is a Fellow of the American Psychological Association and a Diplomat of the American Board of Professional Psychology, as well as a former President of the APA's Society of Addiction Psychology. He's worked as a consultant for federal and non-governmental agencies in the United States such as the White House Office of National Drug Control Policy, the Substance Abuse and Mental Health Services Administration, the National Institutes of Health, Hazelden Betty Ford Foundation, the Caron Foundation, as well as international governments and the United Nations.

In April 2022, Kelly was awarded the Lifetime Achievement Award from the National Council for Mental Wellbeing.

== Select publications ==
- 1998: The effect of depression on return to drinking: A prospective study
- 2000: A multivariate process model of adolescent 12-step attendance and substance use outcome following inpatient treatment
- 2002: Do adolescents affiliate with 12-step groups? A multivariate process model of effects
- 2003: Self-help for substance use disorders: History, effectiveness, knowledge gaps and research opportunities
- 2004: Relapse prevention for substance use disorders: Adapting the adult-based paradigm for youth
- 2005: The effects of age composition of 12-step groups on adolescent 12-step participation and substance use outcome
- 2006: A 3-year study of addiction mutual-help group participation following intensive outpatient treatment
- 2007: Adolescents' participation in Alcoholics Anonymous and Narcotics Anonymous: Review, implications, and future directions
- 2008: Accounting for practice-based evidence in evidence-based practice
- 2009: Twelve-step facilitation in non-specialty settings
- 2010: Does our choice of substance-related terms influence perceptions of treatment need? An empirical investigation with two commonly used terms.
- 2011: Alcoholics Anonymous and young people
- 2012: Broadening the base of addiction mutual help organizations
- 2013: Mutual-help groups for alcohol and other substance use disorders
- 2014: The new science on AA and 12-step facilitation
- 2015: Outcomes research on 12-step programs
- 2016: Twelve-step mutual-help organizations and facilitation interventions
- 2017: Are societies paying unnecessarily for an otherwise free lunch? Final musings on the research on Alcoholics Anonymous and its mechanisms of behavior change
- 2018: Mechanisms of behavior change in 12-step approaches to recovery in young adults
- 2019: How Many Recovery Attempts Does it Take to Successfully Resolve an Alcohol or Drug Problem? Estimates and Correlates From a National Study of Recovering U.S. Adults
- 2020: Alcoholics Anonymous and 12-step facilitation treatments for alcohol use disorder: A distillation of a 2020 Cochrane review for clinicians and policy makers
- 2021: Addiction Recovery Mutual-Aid Organisations
