= John Kelley (Medal of Honor) =

Irish born recipient of the Medal of Honor

John Kelley (April 10, 1841 - September 12, 1927) was an Irish born (Curan, Ireland) recipient of the Medal of Honor and a sailor in the Union Navy during the American Civil War.

== Biography ==
Kelley's grave at Mount Evergreen Cemetery

Kelley was born in Ireland. He served as Second Class Fireman aboard the USS Ceres during the American Civil War. He earned his medal in action aboard the Ceres on July 9, 1862. He died in Jackson, Michigan on September 12, 1927, and is now interred in Mount Evergreen Cemetery in Jackson. His medal is now located in the Naval Historical Center in Washington, DC.

== Medal of Honor Citation ==
For extraordinary heroism in action as Second Class Fireman on board the USS Ceres in the fight near Hamilton, Roanoke River, North Carolina, 9 July 1862. When his ship was fired on by the enemy with small arms, Second Class Fireman Kelley returned the raking fire, courageously carrying out his duties through the engagement and was spoken of for good conduct and cool bravery under enemy fires, by the commanding officer.
