= Dominick Kelly =

Irish poet

- Known for: The Battle of the Chanters

Dominick Kelly was an 18th-century Irish poet. His poems include The Battle of the Chanters, The Grave of Love, and Molly White; or the Bride Bewitched. He was from Roscommon or Ballyglass and died around 1806. He used the courtesy titles Esquire and M.D.
