= John Kelly (rugby union, born 1995) =

English rugby union player

- Born: John Kelly; 11 October 1995 (age 31) Hereford, England
- Height: 1.93 m (6 ft 4 in)
- Weight: 120 kg (18 st 13 lb)
- School: Lucton School
- University: University of Plymouth

Rugby union career
- Position: Lock/Flanker
Senior career
Years	Team	Apps	(Points)
2014–2019	Luctonians	50	(0)
2015	North Otago		
2019–2021	Plymouth Albion	30	(0)
2021–2023	Doncaster Knights	19	(0)
2023–	Newcastle Falcons	10	(0)
- Correct as of 22 September 2024
International career
Years	Team	Apps	(Points)
2019	England Counties		

John Kelly (born 11 October 1995) is an English rugby union player who plays for Newcastle Falcons in the Gallagher Premiership competition.

Kelly originally played for his hometown club Luctonians where he has made over 50 appearances for the team in National League 2 West. He also did a stint in New Zealand playing for North Otago in the Heartland Championship for the 2015 season.

Kelly moved up to National League 1 as he signs for Plymouth Albion from the 2019–20 season. During his time at Plymouth, he was selected for the England Counties team in a two match series against Georgia XV in June 2019.

On 14 July 2020, Kelly moves up to the RFU Championship as he signs for Doncaster Knights from the 2021–22 season. On 13 April 2023, Kelly would leave Doncaster to sign for Gallagher Premiership side Newcastle Falcons on a two-year deal ahead of the 2023–24 season.
