= John Kelly (Nottinghamshire cricketer) =

English cricketer

John "Jack" Kelly (15 September 1930 at Conisbrough, Yorkshire - 11 October 2008 in Worksop, Nottinghamshire), played first-class cricket for Nottinghamshire from 1953 to 1957. He later played Minor Counties cricket for Devon, taking all ten wickets in an innings against Berkshire in 1961.

Kelly was a left-handed middle-order batsman and a slow left-arm orthodox spin bowler. In three seasons, 1953, 1954 and 1956, he played in around half of Nottinghamshire's matches.
