= Dom Kelly (footballer) =

English cricketer

Personal information
- Date of birth: 23 June 1917
- Place of birth: Sandbach, England
- Date of death: 20 October 1982 (aged 65)
- Place of death: Croydon, England
- Height: 6 ft 1 in (1.85 m)
- Position: Centre half

Youth career
- Sandbach Ramblers

Senior career*
Years	Team	Apps	(Gls)
1935–1938	Leeds United	4	(0)
1938–1946	Newcastle United	1	(0)
Total		5	(0)
- * Club domestic league appearances and goals

Dominic Kelly (23 June 1917 – 20 October 1982) was an English professional footballer who played as a centre half. His career was shortened by WW2. He was later a police officer and cricketer before being convicted of theft, embezzlement and manslaughter.

== Early and personal life ==
Kelly was born in Sandbach, the younger brother of fellow footballer John Kelly. The two played together at Leeds United.

== Career ==
Kelly played club football for Sandbach Ramblers, Leeds United and Newcastle United. His career was interrupted by World War II; he joined the Royal Corps of Signals, and played Army football. He retired after the end of World War II due to ligament damage exacerbated by his war service.

== Later life and death ==
Upon his retirement from football in 1946 he joined the Newcastle upon Tyne City Police, During this time he played cricket and represented Northumberland. He was fired by the police in 1957 after being convicted of theft, and was later jailed for embezzlement in 1960. He moved to London and was convicted of manslaughter in 1969, serving five years in prison, having set fire to the hotel where he was working as a night porter, resulting in the death of a chambermaid. Kelly died on 20 October 1982 in Croydon.
