= John Kelly (footballer, born 1913) =

English footballer

Personal information
- Date of birth: 1913
- Place of birth: Sandbach, England
- Height: 5 ft 10 in (1.78 m)
- Position: Forward

Senior career*
Years	Team	Apps	(Gls)
19??–1933	Accrington Stanley	0	(0)
1933–1935	Leeds United	4	(0)
1935	Barnsley	3	(0)
1935–1936	Bradford City	5	(0)
- Bedford Town
- * Club domestic league appearances and goals

John Kelly (1913 – after 1936) was an English professional footballer who played as a centre forward or inside forward.

== Career ==
Kelly was born in 1913 in Sandbach, Cheshire. He was on the books of Accrington Stanley before making his Football League debut for Leeds United during the 1934–35 season. He was known as Mick Kelly while at Leeds, to distinguish him from clubmate Jack Kelly. He left Leeds on 23 October 1935, and after a brief spell with Barnsley, during which he played three Second Division matches, he signed for Bradford City on 21 November, which meant he was registered with three clubs within a month. During his time with Bradford City he made five appearances in the Football League, and left in 1936 for Bedford Town.

His brother Dom also played league football.

== Sources ==
- Frost, Terry (1988). Bradford City A Complete Record 1903–1988. Breedon Books Sport. ISBN 0-907969-38-0.
- Joyce, Michael (2004). Football League Players' Records 1888 to 1939. Nottingham: Soccerdata. ISBN 978-1-899468-67-6.
