= John Paul Kelly (footballer) =

Irish footballer

John Paul (Joxer)Kelly
Personal information
- Full name: John Paul(Joxer)Kelly
- Date of birth: 16 June 1987 (age 39)
- Place of birth: Dublin, Ireland
- Position: Midfielder

Youth career
- Lourdes Celtic
- 2005: Liverpool

Senior career*
Years	Team	Apps	(Gls)
2005–2008	Bohemians		
2009	Drogheda United		

International career
2002	Republic of Ireland U16	1	(1)
- Republic of Ireland U19
2006	Republic of Ireland U21	23	(10)
- * Club domestic league appearances and goals

John Paul Kelly (born 16 June 1987) is an Irish former professional footballer, best known for his spell with Bohemians.

== Biography ==
Kelly began his career at Liverpool, playing in its academy set-up, before returning to Ireland due to homesickness. In 2005, he signed for Bohemians, and during his time there, won the Premier Division and the FAI Cup, both in 2008.

The following year, he signed for Drogheda United, but left the club after twelve games. In 2017, it was reported that he had returned to football, signing for amateur club St James's Gate but Rafa Fallon left him on the bench for 90 mins in his first game vs Pegasus and he swiftly retired
