= John Calley (engineer) =

John Calley (also spelt Cawley) (1663 – May 1725, The Hague), was a metalworker, plumber and glass-blower, who became famous for being Thomas Newcomen's partner. Like Newcomen, he was a member of a Dartmouth family.

He helped develop the Newcomen atmospheric engine. He worked with Newcomen in introducing the engine to the Midlands, operating under the patent of Thomas Savery. The engine they created was a variation on the then current technology using a combination of steam cylinders, pistons, surface condensation and the separation of parts that were usually placed together to create this new technology.

He installed an early Newcomen engine at More Hall Colliery in the grounds of Austhorpe Hall in Leeds, where he is said to have become ill and died during maintenance work. However, there is also evidence that he died in The Hague in 1725, while trying to secure a foreign patent for another device.
