= TLDR News =

British independent news outlet

YouTube information
- Channels: TLDRnewsGLOBAL; TLDRnews; TLDRnewsEU
- Years active: 2017–present
- Genres: News, Politics
- Subscribers: 1.14 million (TLDRnewsGLOBAL) 919 thousand (TLDRnews) 1.13 million (TLDRnewsEU)
- Views: 269 million (TLDRnewsGLOBAL) 222 million (TLDRnews) 302 million (TLDRnewsEU)
- Last updated: 10th July 2026
- Website: tldrnews.co.uk

TLDR News are a British independent news outlet founded in 2017 by Jack Kelly (born August 1996) and primarily hosted on channels across YouTube and Nebula. Most of their video reports focus on political issues in the United Kingdom and abroad. The abbreviation in their name stands for 'too long; didn't read' (TL;DR).

The outlet is owned by the company Three26 Ltd, of which Kelly is the CEO and sole owner.

== History ==
Jack Kelly, then a 20-year-old computer science graduate, founded TLDR News in 2017 with the aim of making news engaging to young audiences. Kelly observed multiple American outlets publishing infographic news on social media aimed towards younger demographics. At the time, there existed almost no similar content within the United Kingdom. He has credited some of their initial success to the channel being founded during the Brexit negotiations which drew attention to them, as well as lack of competition from traditional outlets online.

In March 2024, Kelly appeared in Press Gazette's podcast The Future of Media, Explained. He discussed how the organisation generate income and fund their editorial staff. That June, the Reuters Institute for the Study of Journalism observed their popularity with young consumers along with other online news channels such as Under the Desk News.

== Corporate profile ==
TLDR News are based in London. Until 2024, when the network moved to Clerkenwell, they were headquartered in South Bank (in a building near the Oxo Tower).

As of August 2025 their staff consist of twelve full-time employees. Their annual income of around £1 million largely derives from combinations of YouTube advertisement revenue, sponsorships established by their network Nebula. About 1% of their revenue stems from payments for talks and panel appearances. In addition, revenue of TLDR News has been increasing each year by 28%. Their digital magazine Too Long is one of the company's largest sources of revenue, generating £515,410 in 2025.

== Content ==
TLDR News's primary audience is under the age of 35. Their members research press releases, official documents, transcripts, and other records when finding topics to produce as videos. Averaging ten minutes in duration, they distribute videos across their TLDR News, TLDR Global, TLDR EU, and TLDR Business channels. The four respectively focus on contemporary issues in the UK, in the European Union, across the world, and in the business community. Examples include "How a US-Saudi Defence Pact Could End the War in Gaza", which has received 190,000 views and nearly a thousand comments, and "Why Putin Couldn't Invade Finland" which has received 2.3 million views. It is the most popular video of the channel.

TLDR News prints Too Long, a magazine launched in September 2023. Too Long consists of 80 pages and contains 20 to 30 news stories. As of July 2026, the magazine had 8,300 paid subscribers.

TLDR News release approximately twenty videos across their channels every week, each filmed within two days. According to Kelly, no regulatory bodies (such as Ofcom) monitor the network. He has furthermore stated that owing to this, they are potentially liable to higher rates of error than mainstream outlets. Two of TLDR News's videos have been analysed by foreign news agencies.

== Policies ==
TLDR state that they place a strong emphasis on remaining independent and free from corporate or third-party influence. As such, Kelly is the sole owner of the organisation and steps are taken to ensure that corporate sponsors have no say or influence in the selection or presentation of the news stories covered.

TLDR have been noted for their transparency regarding their finances, with annual videos featuring comprehensive breakdowns of their revenues and expenses.
