= Morley, West Yorkshire =

Market town and civil parish in West Yorkshire, England

Coordinates: 53.749166°N 1.602263°W

Morley
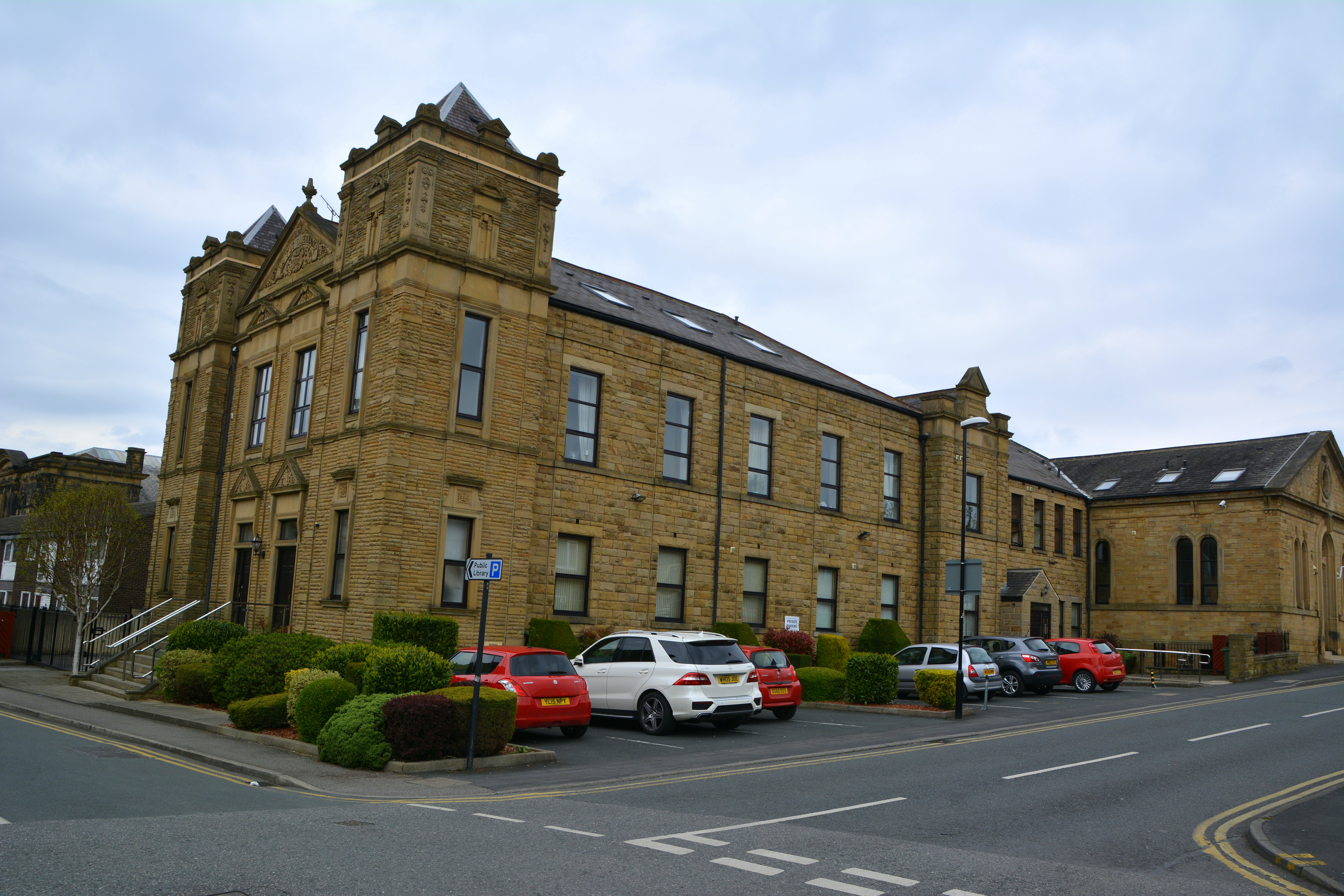
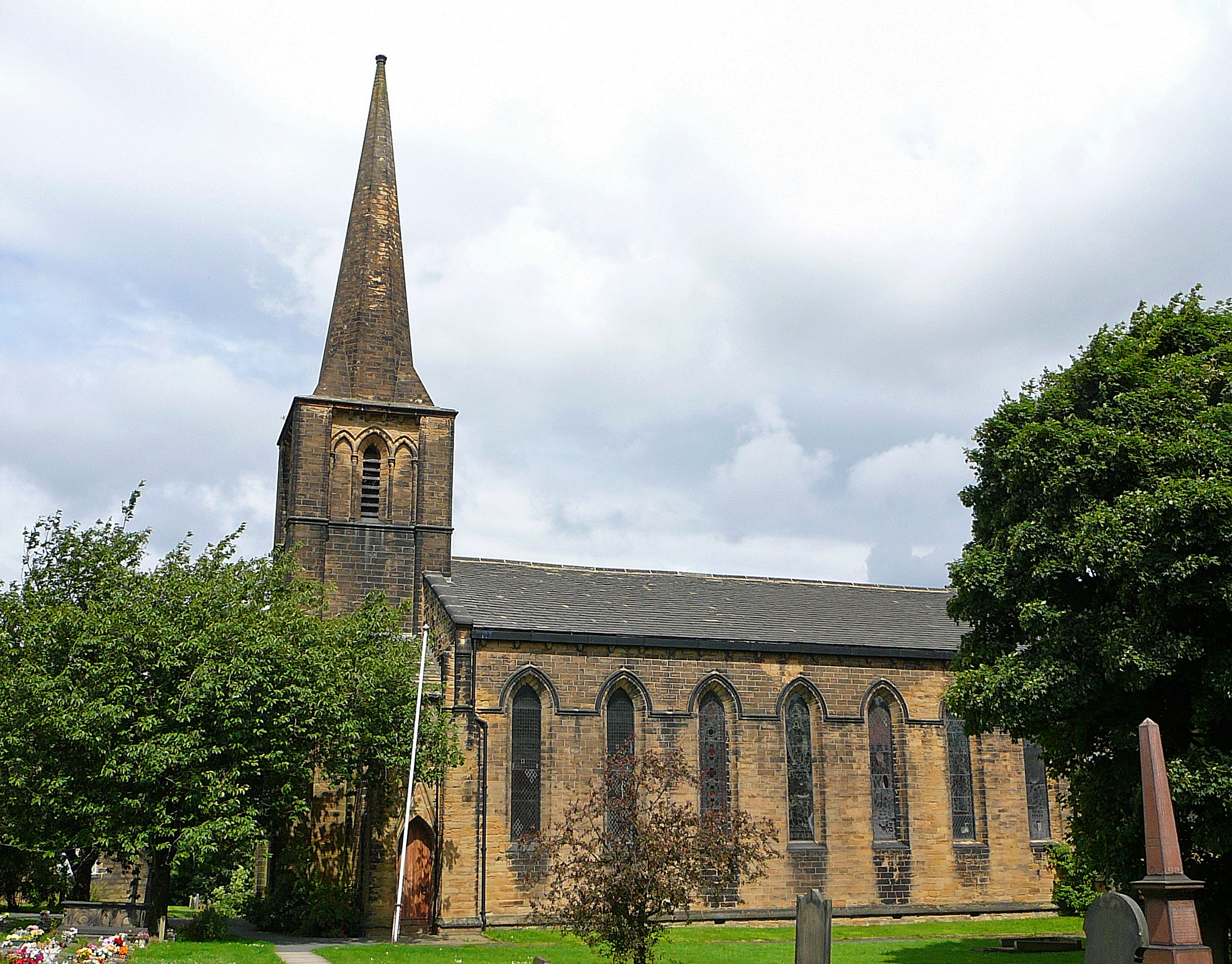
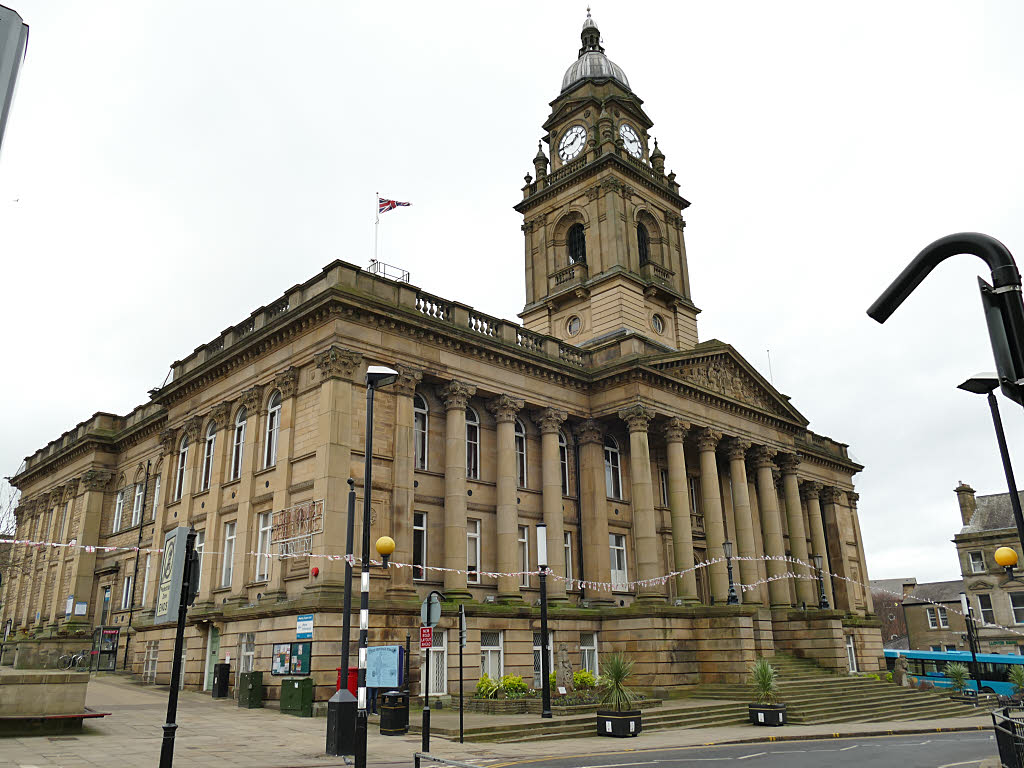
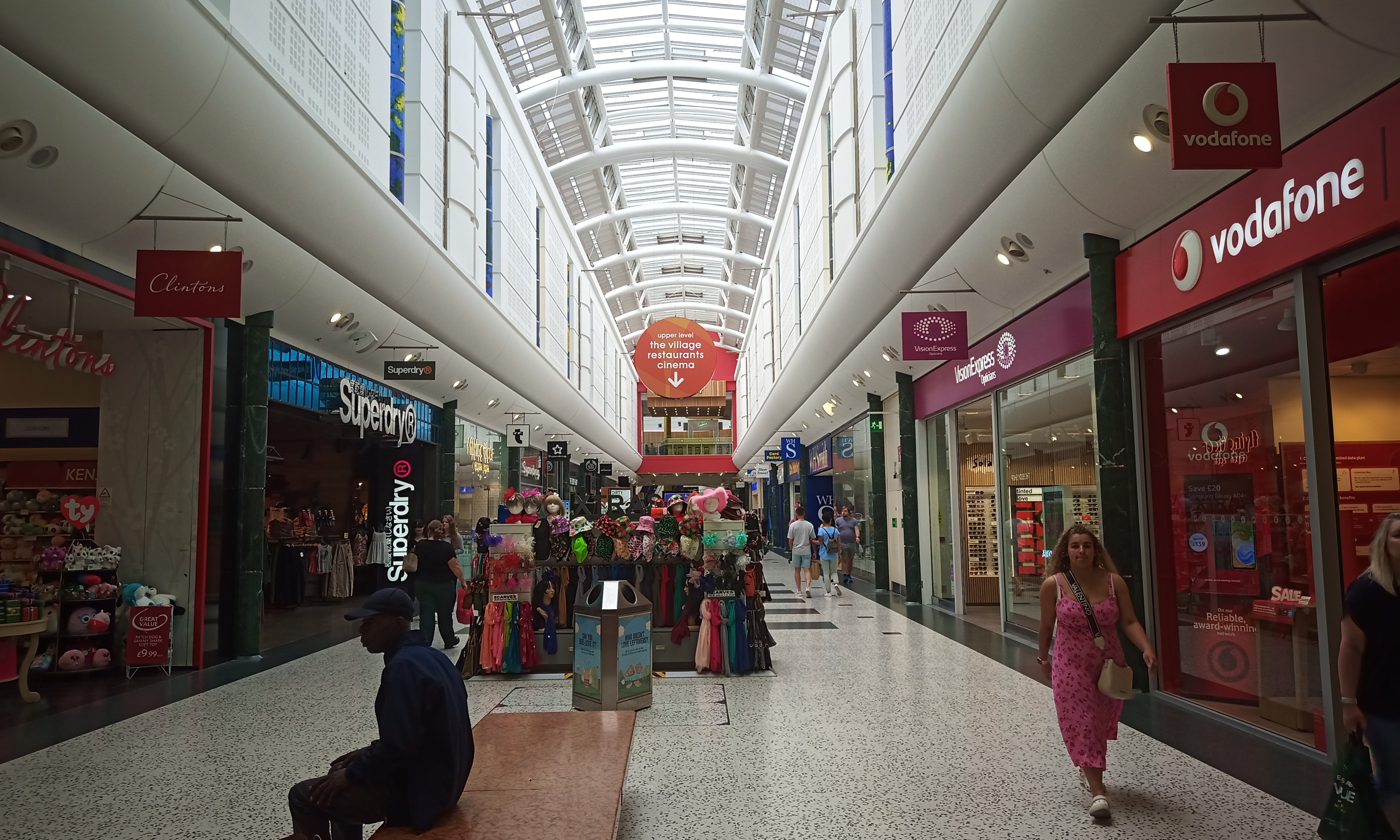
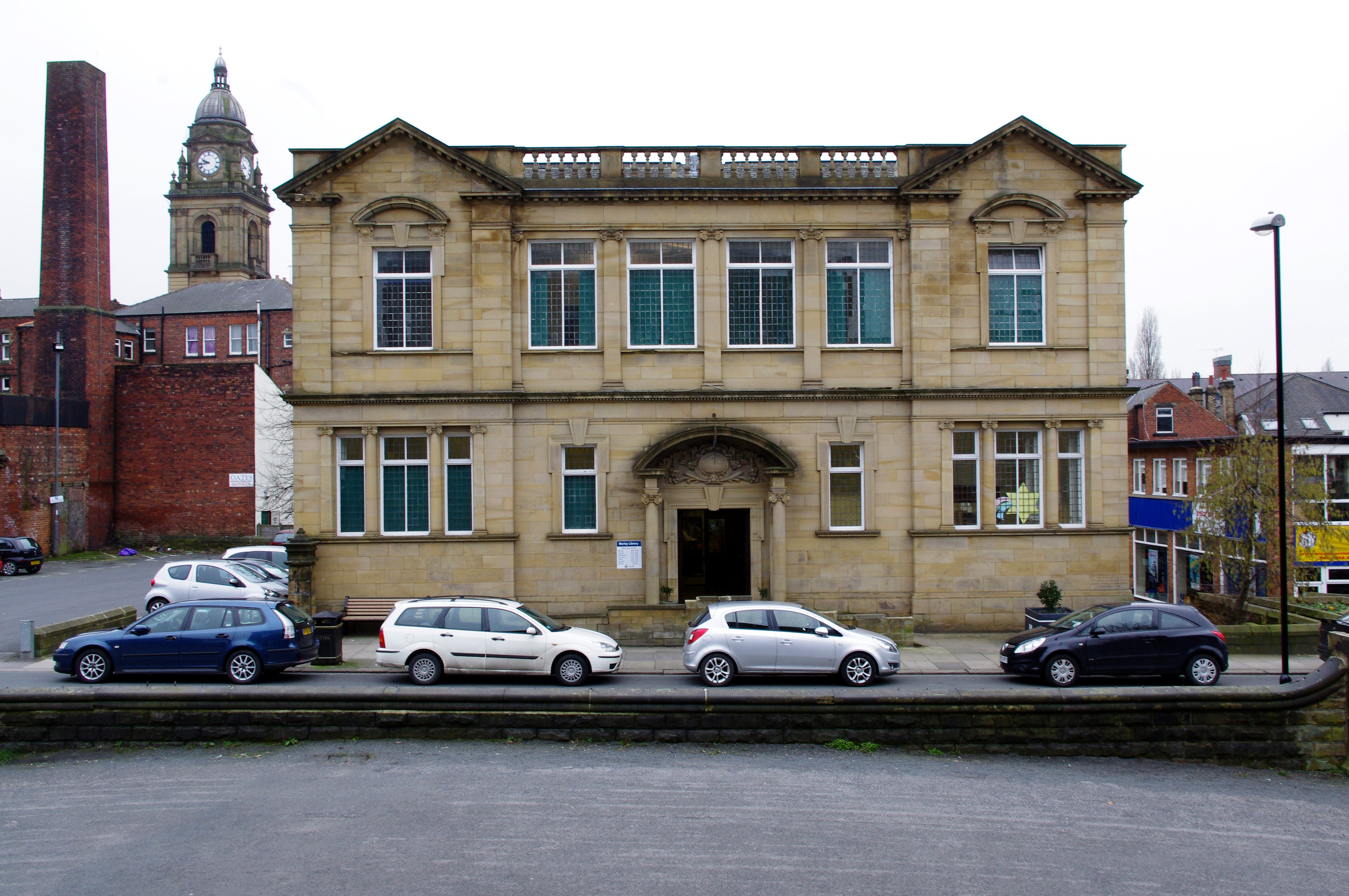
- Baptist Tabernacle St Peter’s Church Morley Town Hall White Rose Centre The Library

- Location within West Yorkshire
- Population: 44,440 (Including Adwalton. 2011)
- OS grid reference: SE265275
- Civil parish: Morley
- Metropolitan borough: City of Leeds
- Metropolitan county: West Yorkshire
- Region: Yorkshire and the Humber
- Country: England
- Sovereign state: United Kingdom
- Post town: LEEDS
- Postcode district: LS27
- Dialling code: 0113
- Police: West Yorkshire
- Fire: West Yorkshire
- Ambulance: Yorkshire
- UK Parliament: Leeds South West and Morley

Morley is a market town and a civil parish within the City of Leeds metropolitan borough, in West Yorkshire, England. Morley is the largest town in the borough after Leeds itself. Morley forms part of the Heavy Woollen District.

It lies approximately 5 miles (8 km) south-west of Leeds city centre. It was built on seven hills: Scatcherd Hill, Dawson Hill, Daisy Hill, Chapel Hill, Hunger Hill, Troy Hill and Banks Hill. In 2011, the town and civil parish had populations of 44,440 and 27,738 respectively. It includes the New Brighton area.

The town is split between the Morley North and Morley South wards (containing the town centre) of Leeds City Council, both making up part of the Leeds South West and Morley parliamentary constituency.

== History ==
Morley was mentioned in the Domesday Book in 1086 as Morelege, Morelei and Moreleia. Morley means "open ground by a moor", from Old English mōr "moor, clearing, pasture" + lēah "open ground, clearing". It gave its name to Morelei Wapentac, a wapentake which probably met at Tingley.

Howley Hall was built during the 1580s by Sir John Savile, a member of the great Yorkshire landowners, the Savile family. The house was besieged during the English Civil War in 1643 before the Battle of Adwalton Moor but appears to have sustained no serious damage. It continued to be occupied during the 17th century but fell into disrepair. The hall was demolished in 1730 but ruins exist including the cellars of its great hall.

The town became famous for its textile industry, notably the cloth, shoddy, which was worn by both sides in the American Civil War.

It was a significant coal mining area. On 7 October 1872, 34 people were killed in an explosion at the Morley Main Colliery.

== Governance ==
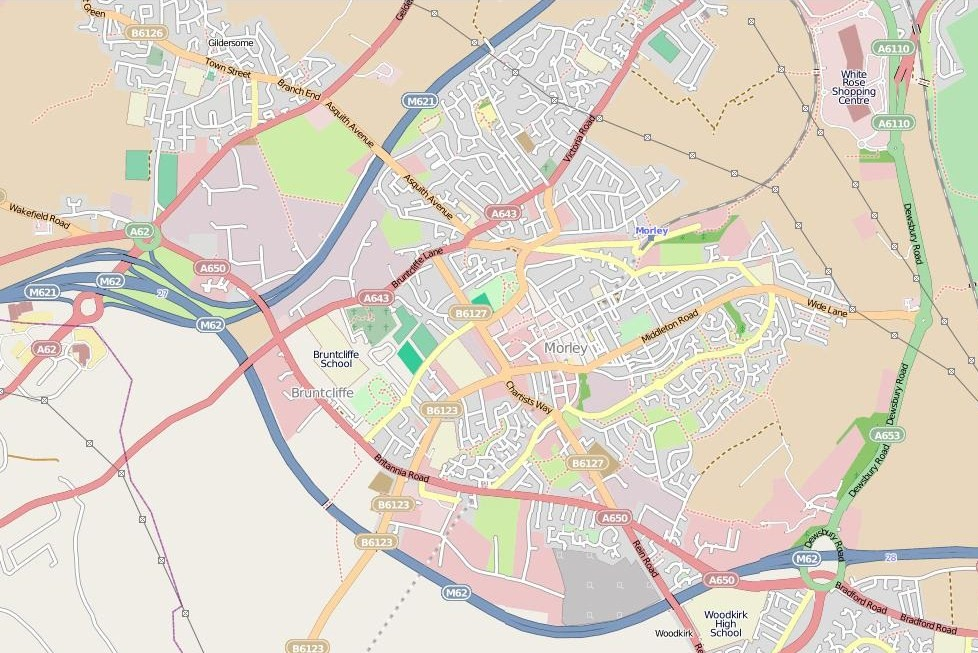
Street map of Morley

Historically, Morley was the centre of one of two divisions of the wapentake of Agbrigg and Morley. Morley became a Municipal Borough in 1889 and under the Local Government Act 1972, was incorporated into the City of Leeds Metropolitan District. Morley is represented on Leeds City Council by three wards (namely Morley North, Morley South and Ardsley and Robin Hood) each with three councillors.

Following a review of parliamentary representation in West Yorkshire, the Morley and Rothwell parliamentary constituency was abolished at the 2010 election and replaced by the Morley and Outwood constituency. At the 2010 general election, Morley and Outwood was won by Ed Balls of the Labour Party, who had been MP for Normanton since 2005, and served as Labour's Shadow Chancellor of the Exchequer from 2011 until 2015. Balls narrowly lost the seat at the 2015 general election to Conservative Andrea Jenkyns. In the 2024 General Election, Mark Sewards won a majority and ousted Andrea Jenkyns from the MP position after the constituency boundaries were redrawn to change Morley and Outwood to Leeds South West and Morley.

A town council was established in 2000. Localities which are included within the town council's area include Churwell, Elmfield, Scatcherd, Teale, Topcliffe and Woodkirk, but Drighlington, Gildersome, Tingley and East and West Ardsley, which were formerly part of the municipal borough, are outside the town council's area.

The town's coat of arms featured the symbolic principal industries of the municipal borough: textile manufacturing, coal mining and quarrying.

== Present ==
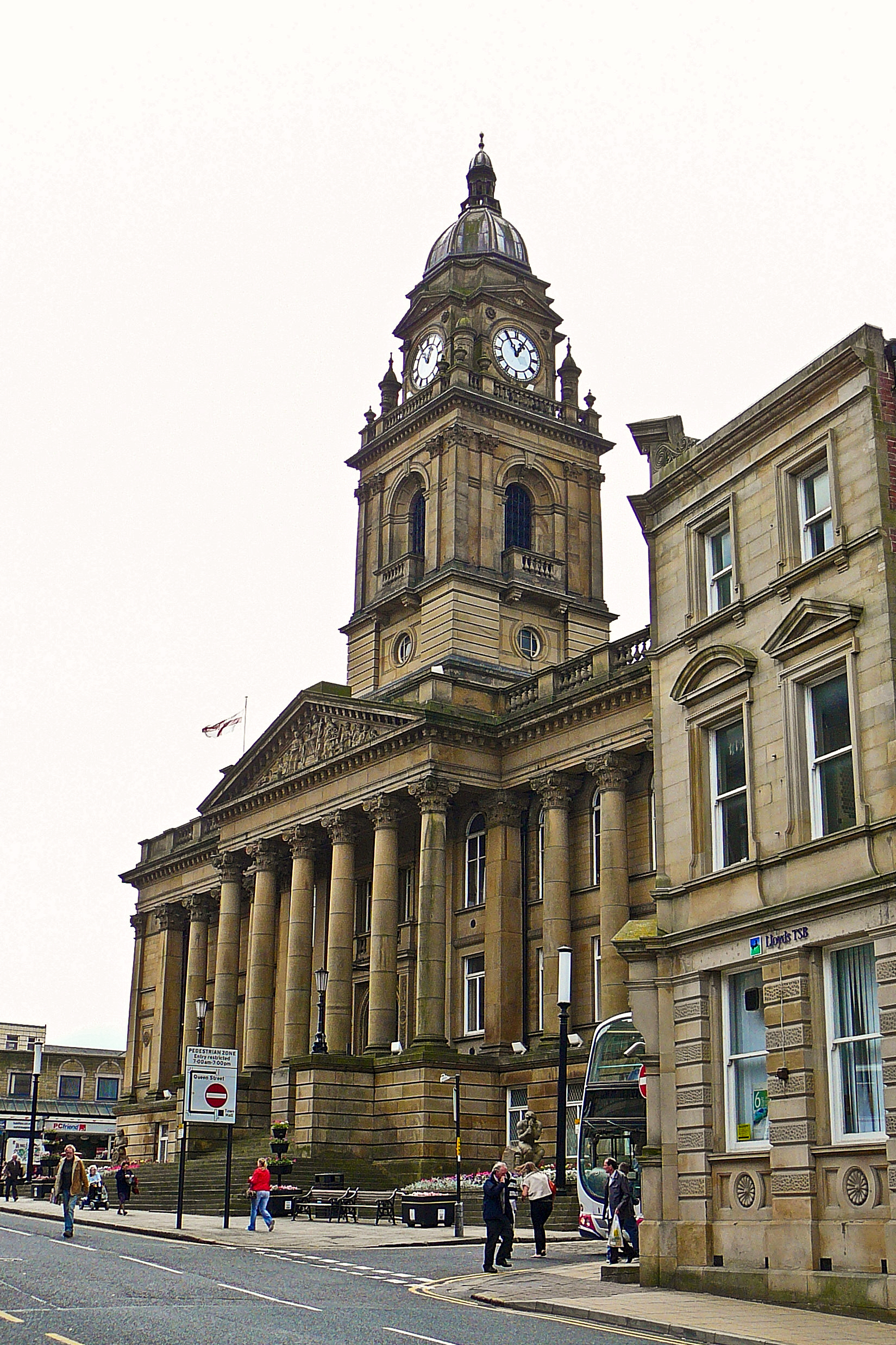
Morley Town Hall, completed in 1895

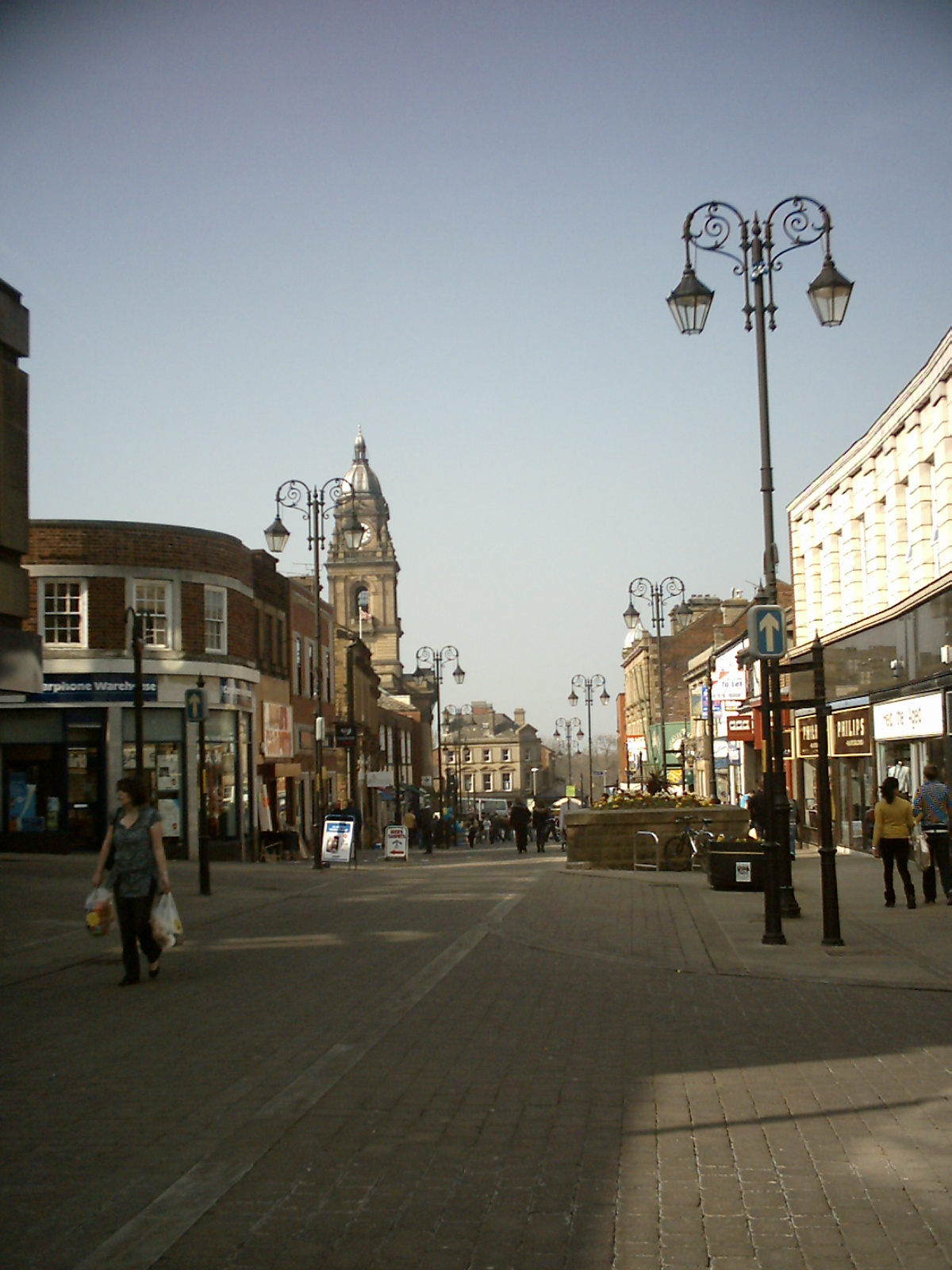
Queen Street

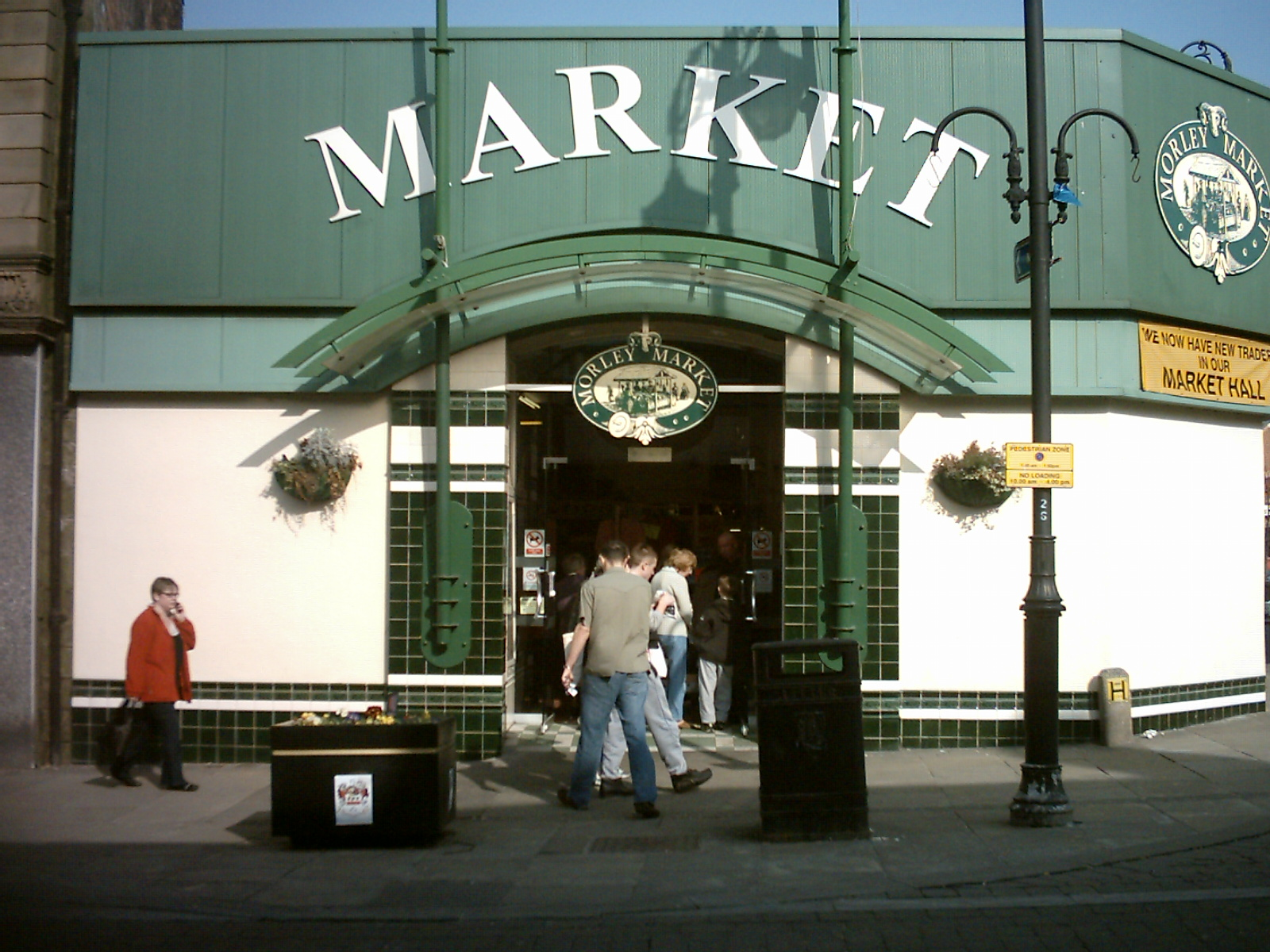
Morley Indoor Market

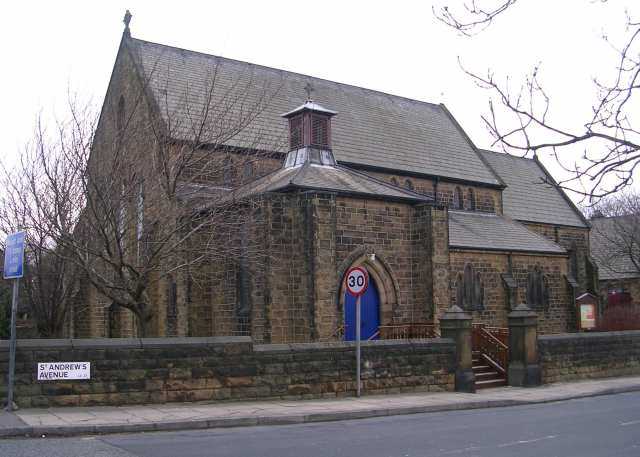
St Andrew's Church

Morley Town Hall is sometimes used for music recordings. Television programmes Heartbeat and Emmerdale have used its disused magistrates' court and a cobblestoned street to one side. It hosts concerts by local schools and performances by the Morley Amateur Operatic Society, whose pantomimes have taken place at the Alexandra Hall for many years.

St Mary in the Wood Church is located to the north of the town centre on Troy Road and Commercial Street. The church has been closed since the late 20th Century and survived until 2010. When a fire broke out and burnt the whole church interior. The site is now overgrown and abandoned although the impressive spire can be seen from the town centre. The congregation still meet at the chapel on Commercial Street.

Morley annually holds one of the largest St George's Day parades in the country and has been named "the most patriotic town in England".

Morley Market has been a feature since the town was formed. The market building has a large trading hall split up into units housing, butchers, fashion shops, supermarkets and a café.

Scatcherd Park in the centre of Morley, by the Morley Leisure Centre, has a large playing field, a skate park, children's park, bowling green and memorial gardens, including the town's war memorial. Events are held on the adjoining field in the summer months.

On 21 February 2010, a statue of Ernie Wise was erected outside Morley Post Office to divided opinion and unveiled by his widow, Doreen. Wise had performed in the old nearby cinema, just around from the Post Office, which is now a Wetherspoons.

On 25 June 2012, the Olympic Torch paused at the Morley Academy on its tour of Britain ahead of the London Olympic Games 2012.

== Transport ==
Morley railway station is half a mile (800 m) from the town centre on the Huddersfield Line. There is a service seven days a week to and from Leeds, but on Sundays, the service is less frequent.

Buses go to Leeds, Bradford, Wakefield and other West Yorkshire towns from bus stops near the Town Hall.

The M621 motorway runs to the west of the town and the M62 motorway to the south. Junctions 27 and 28 of the M62 are closest to Morley.

== Education ==
There are numerous primary schools in Morley including Morley Newlands Academy, Churwell Primary, Seven Hills Primary School, Morley Victoria Primary School, Asquith Primary, Fountain Primary and St Francis Catholic Primary School. It also has an independent preparatory school; Queenswood School.

Three secondary schools serve pupils from Morley: The Morley Academy (formerly Morley High and Morley Grammar), Bruntcliffe Academy and Woodkirk Academy (formerly Woodkirk High and technically in West Ardsley, but has a large proportion of students from Morley due to its catchment area).

A new grassroots music school and venue called Morley Live CIC (Community Interest Company) opened in 2026, in a former high-street bank building in Beryl Burton Gardens.

A new facility called the Morley Learning and Skills Centre will offer courses for adults in the Grade II listed St Mary's in the Wood Church building. The centre will be operated by Leeds City College and will be ready in late 2026.

== Media ==
Local news and television programmes are provided by BBC Yorkshire and ITV Yorkshire. Television signals are received from the Emley Moor TV transmitter. Local radio stations are BBC Radio Leeds, Heart Yorkshire, Capital Yorkshire, Hits Radio West Yorkshire and Greatest Hits Radio West Yorkshire. The town is served by the local newspaper, Morley Observer & Advertiser.

== Sport ==
Morley R.F.C. was founded in 1878. When the Northern Union clubs broke away from the RFU to form the rugby league, the Morley representatives missed the train to Huddersfield due to being in the pub. The club's heyday was in the 1970s when it won the Yorkshire Cup on five occasions. In April 2005 the club won the Powergen Intermediate Cup at Twickenham.

Morley CC cricket club plays in the Bradford League, Morley Town AFC (currently of Yorkshire FA Premier Division) and Morley Amateur FC are the towns football club and Morley Borough play rugby league.

Morley Leisure Centre is newly built after undergoing a £33 million joint project with Armley Leisure Centre completed 22 June 2010 boasting a main 25-metre swimming pool, 10-metre learner pool, 150-station Bodyline gym, numerous sports halls, a dance studio and a cafe.

Independent Wrestling company Dynamic Pro Wrestling (DPW) is based in Morley and put on shows at Ackroyd Street Working Mens Club and around West Yorkshire until its closure in 2011.

Morley was the home of seven times World Cycling Champion Beryl Burton.

Scatcherd Park Bowling club compete in 9 leagues

== Filmography ==
Morley is a setting for David Peace's Red Riding Quartet novel and 2009 television series which explore West Yorkshire police corruption during the 1970s, and 1980s. Emmerdale often use Morley for filming court and wedding scenes in the town hall.

== Twin towns ==
Morley is twinned with Siegen, Germany, since 1966 continuation of partnership with amalgamated City of Leeds as of 1974.

== Notable people ==
Natives of the town refer to themselves as Morleians. Notable Morleians include:

- H. H. Asquith, British Prime Minister
- John Barstow, pianist
- Beryl Burton, racing cyclist
- Brian Bedford, actor, nominated for 7 Tony Awards, Disney's voice of Robin Hood, veteran Shakespearian actor
- Beverley Callard, actress
- Mark Crook, professional footballer
- Tom Donaghy, professional footballer
- Helen Fielding, author of Bridget Jones's Diary
- Jonathan Howson, professional footballer
- Ben Kaye, Batley Bulldogs Rugby League Player
- Aaron Murphy, Huddersfield Giants player
- Jack Popplewell, playwright, composer
- Titus Salt, the creator of Saltaire
- Alice Cliff Scatcherd, pioneer for women's rights and philanthropist who donated Scatcherd Park to the town. Scatcherd is buried in St Mary in the Wood churchyard, Morley.
- Nick Scruton, professional rugby league player
- Joe Seddon, technology entrepreneur and founder of Zero Gravity
- Lee Smith, Leeds RLFC player
- Paul Snowdon, philosopher
- Stevie Ward, Leeds Rhinos player
- John R. Womersley, mathematician and computer scientist

== See also ==
- Listed buildings in Morley, West Yorkshire
