= Morley War Memorial, Scatcherd Park =

War memorial in Morley, West Yorkshire, England

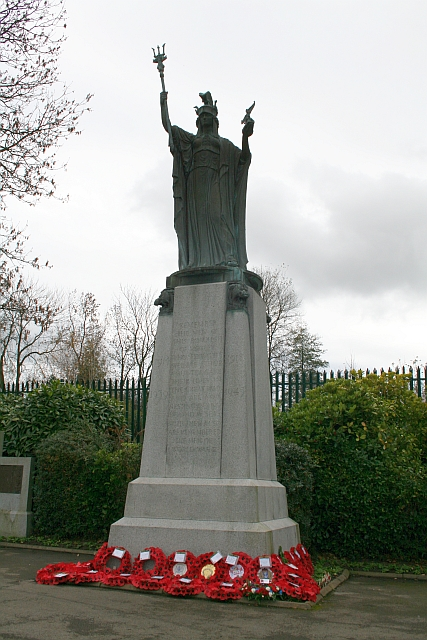
- Morley War Memorial
- Interactive map of Morley War Memorial, Scatcherd Park
- Location: Scatcherd Park, Morley, Leeds, England
- Coordinates: 53°44′52″N 1°36′12″W
- Designer: Walter Gilbert (sculptor)
- Material: Bronze, granite
- Height: 22 ft (6.7 m)

The Morley War Memorial is a British national war memorial situated in Scatcherd Park, Morley, Leeds, England. It was sculpted by Walter Henry Gilbert and cast by H.H. Martyn & Co., it was unveiled 21 May 1927 by Alderman Joseph Kirk and accepted by Mayor Alderman Thomas Marshall. The war memorial was added to the National Heritage List for England on 17 June 1986 as a Grade II listed structure.

This memorial commemorates the residents of Morley who were killed in the First World War, with 453 names, and in the Second World War, with 110 names. It was renovated in 2008 and rededicated 29 June the same year.

== Description ==
The memorial consists of a bronze statue surmounted by a granite plinth. The statue portrays Britannia in a Roman dress holding a trident aloft in her right hand and a statue of a winged man kneeling on one knee in her left hand, symbolising "victory." Located on her bodice is the royal emblem of three rampant lions, she is also wearing an elaborate plumed helmet with seahorses to either side. It is 22 feet tall, including both the statue and plinth.

Behind is a wall bearing name panels. The panels on the left give us the names of those from Morley and Churwell, while the one on the right lists those from, Gildersome, Drighlington, East Ardsley, and West Ardsley. At the base of the plinth, a small plaque entitled "Also Remembered" was added in June 2008, listing a further 11 names.

== Inscription ==
The inscription remains legible, it is located on the pedestal of the figure and reads:

Remember
the men of this
borough of Morley
who seeking the
welfare of their
country laid down their lives
in the Great War and
are now resting beyond the seas on wall:
1914–1918
at the going down of the sun and in the morning we will remember them 1939–1945

== Gallery ==
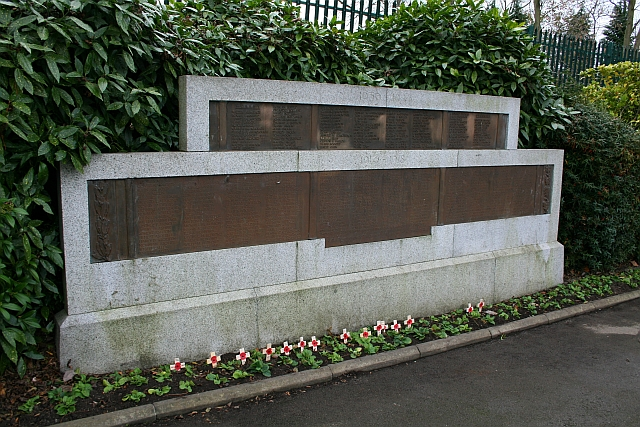

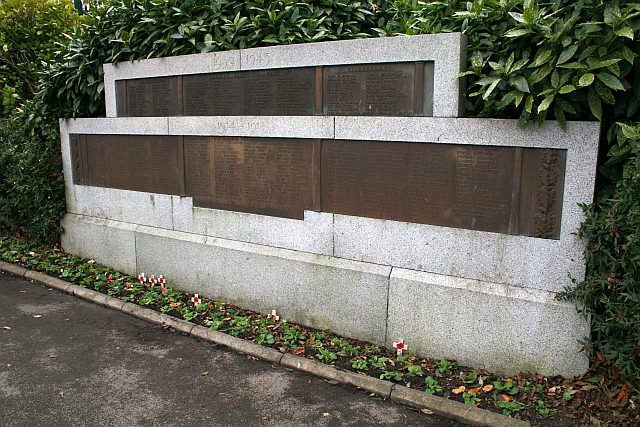

== See also ==
- Listed buildings in Morley, West Yorkshire
