= Churwell =

Suburb of Leeds, West Yorkshire, England

Coordinates: 53.761°N 1.589°W

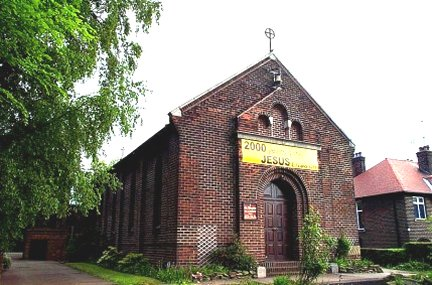
- St Brigid's R.C. Church

- Location within West Yorkshire
- Civil parish: Morley
- Metropolitan borough: City of Leeds
- Metropolitan county: West Yorkshire
- Region: Yorkshire and the Humber
- Country: England
- Sovereign state: United Kingdom
- Post town: LEEDS
- Postcode district: LS27
- Dialling code: 0113
- Police: West Yorkshire
- Fire: West Yorkshire
- Ambulance: Yorkshire
- UK Parliament: Leeds South West and Morley

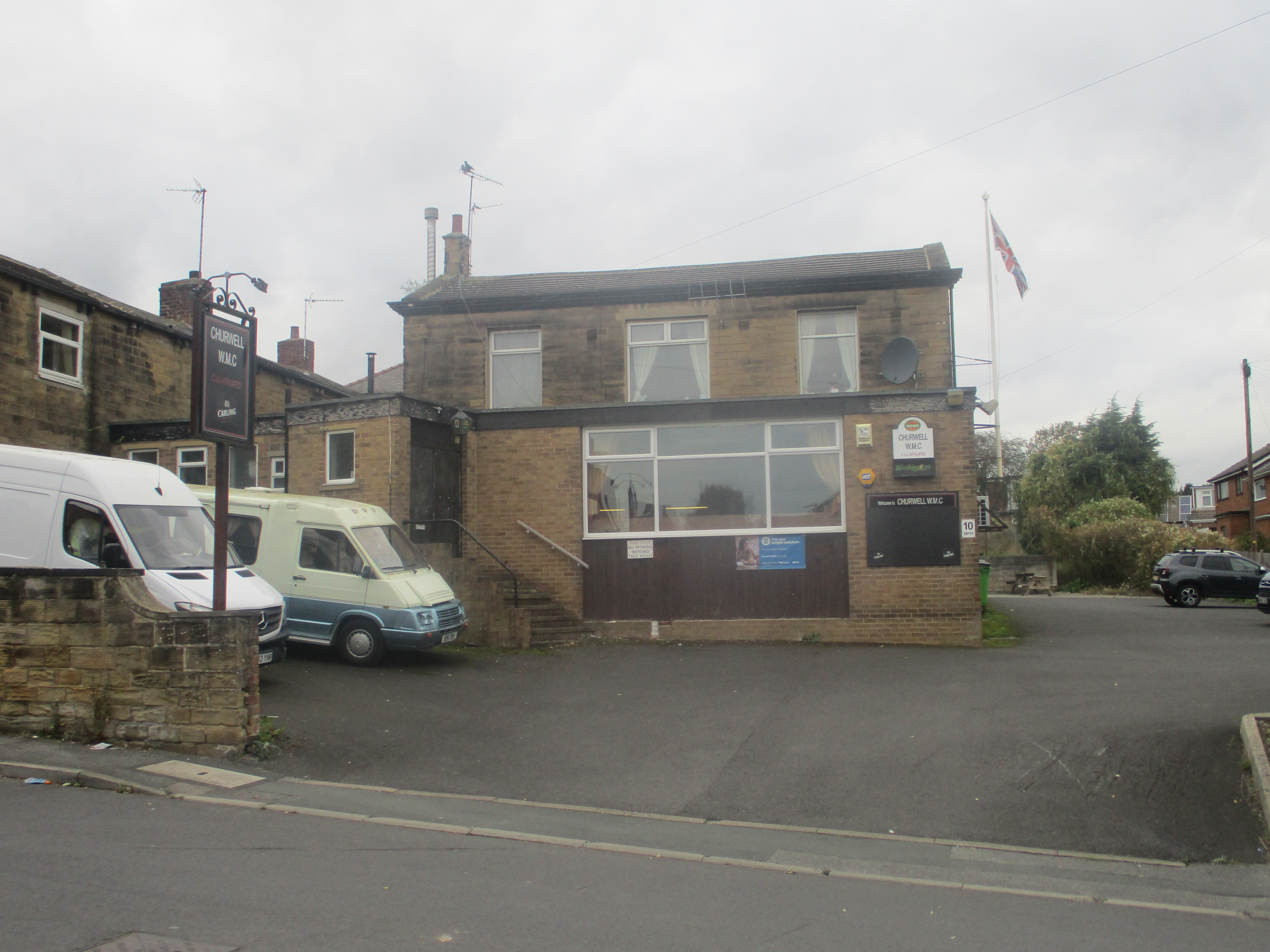
Churwell Working Men's Club

Churwell is a settlement in the civil parish of Morley, in the Leeds district, in West Yorkshire, England, between Leeds city centre and Morley. It is 3 miles (5 km) south-west of Leeds city centre and 1.5 miles (2 km) away from the Leeds United stadium Elland Road.

Churwell still retains its semi-rural feel with farms nearby cultivating, in particular, vegetables and rhubarb.

== Location ==
Churwell is in the Leeds South West and Morley constituency, and is represented by Mark Sewards (Labour) since the 2024 United Kingdom general election. Until 2024, Churwell was in the now-defunct Morley and Outwood constituency, represented by Andrea Jenkyns (Conservative). Boundary changes in 2010 saw it leave the now-defunct Morley and Rothwell constituency, in which it was represented by Colin Challen (Labour).

It is in the LS27 postcode area, and its telephone area code is 0113, the Leeds prefix. Formerly a small village, forming part of the Municipal Borough of Morley, it was expanded significantly in recent decades to become more suburban in nature. For administrative purposes, it is still classed as part of Morley in the census; sitting within the governance of Morley Town Council and the Morley North ward of Leeds City Council. It also has a primary school.

== History ==
Churwell was formerly a township in the parish of Batley, in 1866 Churwell became a separate civil parish, 1 April 1937 the parish was abolished and merged with Morley. In 1931 the parish had a population of 2,190.

=== Etymology ===
The name Churwell is first attested in 1226 in the forms Churlewell and Churlewall. The names comes from the Old English words ceorla (the genitive plural of ceorl, 'free man of the lower class, peasant') and wella ('well, spring, stream'). Thus the name once meant 'spring of the peasants'.

== Historical landmarks ==
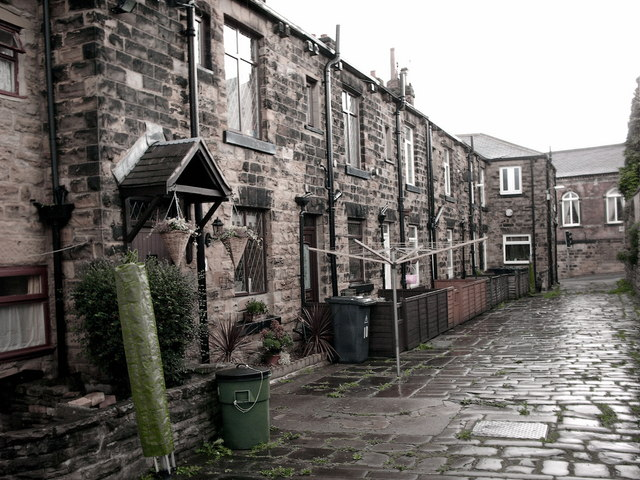
Back of Clarendon Terrace, Park Street, Churwell

Churwell is centred on "Churwell Hill" which is made up of the A643. About three-quarters of the way up Churwell Hill, the road changes name from Elland Road to Victoria Road. There have historically been three local public houses, of which two remain: The Commercial, the Golden Fleece (demolished) and the New Inn. These are known locally as top oyle, middle oyle and bottom oyle, relating to their position on the hill. The Golden Fleece was demolished in 2010 and is now occupied by a Tesco Express store which still has the Golden Fleece sign outside of it. In spring of 2017 opposite the Tesco Express on Old Road, Bar 27 opened on the premises of the old fish and chip shop. This has become known locally as the little oyle due to its size.

Churwell once had a poorhouse. The building, Grade II listed, was built in 1865. It is just off Elland Road, and was used as a community centre up until May 2011, at which point the Stanhope Memorial Hall, across the road from the Poor Hall, became the community centre.

The village expanded considerably in the early 1960s with new private and council housing developments, particularly to the north on land between School Street and the then-Leeds City boundary. In 1993, the old stone Churwell Primary School in School Street was demolished and moved to modern premises in the village. Houses now stand on the old school site.

In 1923, a runaway tram ran down Churwell Hill and ended in tragedy: six people were killed and 35 injured when the brakes failed and the tram crashed into a field wall at Cottingley.

Tragedy hit the village in 1962, when a motorcyclist ploughed into a group of girls returning from Sunday school on Churwell Hill, killing two and injuring several others.

== Churwell New Village ==
Since 2001, a considerable amount of housing development has taken place, one notable area is Churwell New Village a development with more than 350 new residencies, planners estimated 0.5 cars per household. The development was built on a green field industrial area that once had a pit, brick works and later a reclamation yard on it.

== Notable people ==
Natives of the town refer to themselves as Morleians. Notable Morleians include:

- British Prime Minister H. H. Asquith
- Sir Titus Salt, the creator of Saltaire
- Alice Scatcherd, 19th century pioneer for women's rights and philanthropist who donated Scatcherd Park to the town
- Jack Popplewell, playwright, composer of popular music
- Helen Fielding, author of Bridget Jones's Diary
- Bobby Peel, Yorkshire CCC and England Cricketer of the late 19th Century
- Ben Kaye, Harlequins RL Player
- Nick Scruton, Bradford RLFC player
- Lee Smith, Leeds RLFC player
- Jonathan Howson, Middlesbrough F.C. player
- Mark Crook, former professional footballer
- Ernie Wise, of Morecambe and Wise fame
- Daniel Cammish, Porsche Carrera Cup Great Britain 2015 and 2021 Champion
- Aaron Murphy, Huddersfield Giants Player

== Public transport ==
=== Rail ===
Churwell, ll particularly the New Village development, is very near the Cottingley railway station on the Huddersfield Line, between Leeds and Morley. There are hourly train services to Huddersfield and Leeds, with increased frequency at peak times and additional destinations including Sheffield and Manchester in the evening peak period.

=== Bus ===
Churwell is well served by local bus services to city centre and Moor Allerton.
