= Erdeslau =

Erdeslau or Ardeslawe is the old name for:

- East Ardsley, Leeds, West Yorkshire, England.
- West Ardsley, Leeds, West Yorkshire, England.
