= Woodkirk =

Village in West Yorkshire, England

Coordinates: 53.727°N 1.579°W

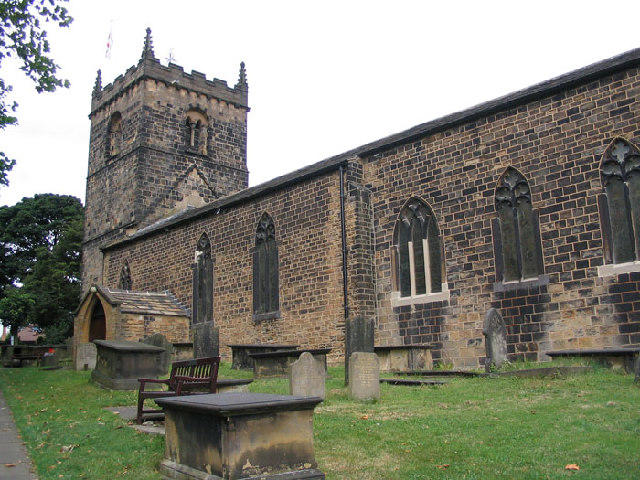
Woodkirk Church

Woodkirk is an ancient village between Leeds and Dewsbury, West Yorkshire, England. The parish church is a grade II listed building. It is traditionally the centre of the parish of West Ardsley, but Tingley is now a much larger settlement.

Woodkirk was part of the Ardsley urban district 1894–1937, which also included West Ardsley and East Ardsley and was then part of Morley municipal borough 1937–1974. The village once formed part of the former municipal borough of Morley, and is still classed as part of Morley in the census. Woodkirk is in the Leeds City Council ward, Morley South, each electing three councillors to Leeds City Council. It is in the Morley and Outwood parliamentary constituency. Since 2019 Woodkirk has been within the civil parish of Morley, governed by Morley Town Council.

Woodkirk is just within the boundaries of the City of Leeds although Woodkirk Post Office is in Kirklees.

Woodkirk contains a high school and sixth form: Woodkirk Academy. The school opened in the late 1940s and had over 1,800 students at itslast full Ofsted inspection in 2013 (in which it was rated as being Good).

The Leeds Country Way passes through the churchyard.

== Railway past ==
Woodkirk was once served by its own railway station, which closed to passengers around 1939, right at the very start of World War II, but the line, which once passed by, continued a further 25 years until its final closure, in 1964. However, the former station site, in Woodkirk itself, still stands though it is now derelict and disused, like the Soothill Tunnel.
