= Morley South (ward) =

Electoral ward in Leeds, England

- Morley South highlighted within Leeds
- Population: 18,284 (2023 electorate)
- Metropolitan borough: City of Leeds
- Metropolitan county: West Yorkshire
- Region: Yorkshire and the Humber
- Country: England
- Sovereign state: United Kingdom
- UK Parliament: Leeds South West and Morley
- Councillors: Michael Burnham (Reform UK); Jane Senior (Morley Borough Independents); Ryan Taylor (Reform UK)

Morley South is an electoral ward of Leeds City Council in south west Leeds, West Yorkshire, covering the town of Morley and west Tingley.

== Boundaries ==
The Morley South ward includes the majority of the civil parish of Morley, except for its north western section sitting in Morley North ward. The entire parish is also overseen by Morley Town Council.

== Councillors ==
Election	Councillor	Councillor	Councillor
1973	Bernard Haydn (Lab)	Ted Hewitt (Lab)	Stuart Welham (Lab)
1975	Bernard Haydn (Lab)	Ted Hewitt (Lab)	Stuart Welham (Lab)
1976	Bernard Haydn (Lab)	B. Broadbent (Con)	Stuart Welham (Lab)
1978	Bernard Haydn (Lab)	B. Broadbent (Con)	Stuart Welham (Lab)
1979	Bernard Haydn (Lab)	B. Broadbent (Con)	Bryan North (Lab)
1980	Bernard Haydn (Lab)	Keith Burnley (Lab)	Bryan North (Lab)
1982	Bernard Haydn (Lab)	Keith Burnley (Lab)	Bryan North (Lab)
1983	Ray Mitchell (Lab)	Keith Burnley (Lab)	Bryan North (Lab)
1984	Ray Mitchell (Lab)	Keith Burnley (Lab)	Bryan North (Lab)
1986	Ray Mitchell (Lab)	Keith Burnley (Lab)	Bryan North (Lab)
1987	Ray Mitchell (Lab)	Keith Burnley (Lab)	Bryan North (Lab)
1988	Ray Mitchell (Lab)	Keith Burnley (Lab)	Bryan North (Lab)
1990	Ray Mitchell (Lab)	Keith Burnley (Lab)	Bryan North (Lab)
1991	Ray Mitchell (Lab)	Keith Burnley (Lab)	Bryan North (Lab)
1992	Ray Mitchell (Lab)	Keith Burnley (Lab)	Bryan North (Lab)
1994	Ray Mitchell (Lab)	Sherry Bradley (Lab)	Bryan North (Lab)
1995	Ray Mitchell (Lab)	Sherry Bradley (Lab)	Bryan North (Lab)
1996	Ray Mitchell (Lab)	Sherry Bradley (Lab)	Bryan North (Lab)
1998	Ray Mitchell (Lab)	Sherry Bradley (Lab)	Bryan North (Lab)
1999	Ray Mitchell (Lab)	Sherry Bradley (Lab)	Bryan North (Lab)
2000	Ray Mitchell (Lab)	Sherry Bradley (Lab)	Bryan North (Lab)
2002	Ray Mitchell (Lab)	Sherry Bradley (Lab)	Bryan North (Lab)
2003	Debra Coupar (Lab) (Note: Coupar lost her seat at the next election in 2004. She was elected to council again in 2006 for Middleton Park ward, stepping down in 2010. Coupar went on to be elected as a Cross Gates and Whinmoor ward councillor in the 2013 by-election and has represented Temple Newsam ward since 2016.)	Sherry Bradley (Lab)	Bryan North (Lab)
2004	Judith Elliott (MBI)	Terry Grayshon (MBI)	Gareth Beevers (MBI)
2006	Judith Elliott (MBI)	Terry Grayshon (MBI)	Christopher Beverley (BNP)
2007	Judith Elliott (MBI)	Terry Grayshon (MBI)	Christopher Beverley (BNP)
2008	Judith Elliott (MBI)	Terry Grayshon (MBI)	Christopher Beverley (BNP)
2010	Judith Elliott (MBI)	Terry Grayshon (MBI)	Shirley Varley (MBI)
2011	Judith Elliott (MBI)	Neil Dawson (Lab)	Shirley Varley (MBI)
2012	Judith Elliott (MBI)	Neil Dawson (Lab)	Shirley Varley (MBI)
2014	Judith Elliott MBE (MBI) (Note: Elliott was awarded an MBE in the 2012 Birthday Honours.)	Neil Dawson (Lab)	Shirley Varley (MBI)
2015	Judith Elliott MBE (MBI)	Neil Dawson (Lab)	Shirley Varley (MBI)
2016	Judith Elliott MBE (MBI)	Neil Dawson (Lab)	Shirley Varley (MBI)
2018	Judith Elliott MBE (MBI)	Neil Dawson (Lab)	Wyn Kidger (MBI)
2019	Judith Elliott MBE (MBI)	Neil Dawson (Lab)	Wyn Kidger (MBI)
2021	Judith Elliott MBE (MBI)	Jane Senior (MBI)	Wyn Kidger (MBI)
2022	Oliver Newton (MBI)	Jane Senior (MBI)	Wyn Kidger (MBI)
2023	Oliver Newton (MBI)	Jane Senior (MBI)	Wyn Kidger (MBI)
2024	Oliver Newton (MBI)	Jane Senior (MBI)	Wyn Kidger (Ind) (Note: Kidger resigned from the Morley Borough Independents prior to the election. She joined fellow former MBI councillor for Morley North, Bob Gettings, and previously Conservative councillor for Pudsey, Trish Smith, to form the Local Independent Party grouping on the council in May 2024. Kidger resigned from the council in April 2025.)
2025 by-election	Oliver Newton (MBI)	Jane Senior (MBI)	Ryan Taylor (RUK)
2026	Michael Burnham* (RUK)	Jane Senior* (MBI)	Ryan Taylor* (RUK)

indicates seat up for re-election. indicates seat up for election following resignation or death of sitting councillor. * indicates incumbent councillor.

== Elections since 2010 ==
=== May 2026 ===
2026
Party	Candidate	Votes	%	±%
Reform	Michael Burnham	2,564	35.1	▲28.1
Morley Borough Independents	Darren Mark Senior	1,957	26.8	▼11.2
Liberal Democrats	Michael James Fox	992	13.6	▲12.0
Green	Matthew Ball	793	10.8	▲1.9
Labour Co-op	Adrian Blake	594	8.1	▼23.1
Conservative	John Barron	402	5.5	▼4.1
SDP	Cordelia Frances Lynan	12	0.2	▲0.1
Turnout			40.5	
Rejected ballots		14		
Registered electors		18,115		
Reform gain from Morley Borough Independents		Swing		

=== June 2025 by-election ===
12 June 2025 replacing Wyn Kidger (resigned)
Party	Candidate	Votes	%	±%
Reform	Ryan Taylor	2,119	36.7	+29.7
Morley Borough Independents	Terry Grayshon	1,450	25.1	−13.0
Liberal Democrats	Michael Fox	1,009	17.5	+15.9
Labour Co-op	Charlotte Hill	634	11.0	−20.2
Green	Chris Bell	313	5.4	−3.5
Conservative	Liam Roberts	230	4.0	−5.6
Majority		669	11.6	+4.8
Turnout		5,767	31.7	−0.7
Reform gain from Morley Borough Independent		Swing	+21.4	

=== May 2024 ===
2024
Party	Candidate	Votes	%	±%
Morley Borough Independent	Jane Senior*	2,221	38.1	−3.4
Labour Co-op	Charlotte Hill	1,824	31.2	+1.4
Conservative	Alexander Giles	560	9.6	−5.2
Green	Chris Bell	521	8.9	±0.0
Reform	James Kendall	407	7.0	New
Independent	Phil Bennett	192	3.3	New
Liberal Democrats	Mihai Barticel	93	1.6	−2.2
SDP	Nigel Perry	8	0.1	−0.7
Majority		397	6.8	−4.7
Turnout		5,878	32.4	+4.7
Morley Borough Independents hold		Swing	-2.4	

=== May 2023 ===
2023
Party	Candidate	Votes	%	±%
Morley Borough Independents	Wyn Kidger*	2,094	41.4	+1.8
Labour	Bailey Bradley	1,510	29.8	−0.4
Conservative	Charles George	749	14.8	−4.8
Green	Chris Bell	450	8.9	+0.9
Liberal Democrats	Mihai Barticel	191	3.8	+1.5
SDP	Andrew Martin	41	0.8	N/A
Majority		584	11.5	+2.1
Turnout		5,062	27.7	−4.5
Morley Borough Independents hold		Swing		

=== May 2022 ===
2022
Party	Candidate	Votes	%	±%
Morley Borough Independents	Oliver Newton	2,321	39.6	+6.5
Labour	Bailey Bradley	1,769	30.2	+4.9
Conservative	Lalit Suryawanshi	1,150	19.6	−7.7
Green	Chris Bell	470	8.0	−1.5
Liberal Democrats	Penny Goodman	137	2.3	+0.6
Majority		552	9.4	+3.6
Turnout		5,857	32.2	−3.3
Morley Borough Independents hold		Swing		

=== May 2021 ===
2021
Party	Candidate	Votes	%	±%
Morley Borough Independent	Jane Senior	2,127	33.1	−17.4
Conservative	Michael Burnham	1,754	27.3	+14.7
Labour	Bailey Bradley	1,689	26.3	+0.1
Green	Chris Bell	608	9.5	+2.6
Liberal Democrats	Peter Richard Andrews	110	1.7	−1.1
SDP	Joshua Sturgeon	104	1.6	N/A
Majority		373	5.8	−18.5
Turnout		6,431	35.5	+8.0
Morley Borough Independent gain from Labour		Swing		

=== May 2019 ===
2019
Party	Candidate	Votes	%	±%
Morley Borough Independent	Wyn Kidger*	2,403	50.5	+10.1
Labour Co-op	Pete Compton	1,248	26.2	−7.8
Conservative	Lewis Jones	601	12.6	−1.1
Green	Chris Bell	375	7.9	−1.5
Liberal Democrats	Peter Richard Andrews	129	2.8	+0.4
Majority		1,145	24.3	+16.8
Turnout		4,811	27.5	−3.2
Morley Borough Independent hold		Swing		

=== May 2018 ===
2018
Party	Candidate	Votes	%	±%
Morley Borough Independent	Judith Elliott*	2,500	40.4	−2.8
Labour Co-op	Neil Dawson*	2,102	34.0	+5.5
Morley Borough Independent	Wyn Kidger	2,082		
Morley Borough Independent	Robert Finnigan	2,028		
Labour Co-op	Charlotte Hill	1,799		
Labour Co-op	Luke Mitchell	1,712		
Conservative	Rachel Oldham	848	13.7	+2.9
Conservative	Jermaine Sanwoolu	698		
Green	Chris Bell	583	9.4	+6.5
Conservative	Jas Singh	547		
Liberal Democrats	Raymond Smith	148	2.4	+1.3
Majority		398	7.5	−7.2
Turnout		5,309	30.7	−0.1
Morley Borough Independent hold		Swing		
Labour Co-op hold		Swing		
Morley Borough Independent hold		Swing		

=== May 2016 ===
2016
Party	Candidate	Votes	%	±%
Morley Borough Independent	Judith Elliott*	2,188	43.2	+18.0
Labour	Sarah Keig	1,445	28.5	+2.0
UKIP	David Kent	687	13.6	−3.3
Conservative	Jane Eastwood	547	10.8	+10.0
Green	Christopher Bell	145	2.9	−0.8
Liberal Democrats	Aqila Choudhry	55	1.1	−0.9
Majority		743	14.7	+9.3
Turnout		5.067	30.8	
Morley Borough Independent hold		Swing		

=== May 2015 ===
2015
Party	Candidate	Votes	%	±%
Labour	Neil Dawson*	3,071	30.5	−2.9
Morley Borough Independent	Wyn Kidger	2,523	25.0	−7.6
Conservative	Kathleen Tempest	2,096	20.8	+9.2
UKIP	Lindon Dove	1,708	16.9	+16.9
Green	Claire Hawker	370	3.7	+3.7
Liberal Democrats	John Durno MacArthur	203	2.0	−0.8
TUSC	Neil Cussons	107	1.1	+1.1
Majority		548	5.4	+4.6
Turnout		10,078	60.3	
Labour hold		Swing	+2.4	

=== May 2014 ===
2014
Party	Candidate	Votes	%	±%
Morley Borough Independent	Shirley Varley*	1,967		
Labour	Mark Sewards	1,293		
UKIP	Lindon Dove	1,279		
Conservative	Kathleen Tempest	489		
Green	Bluebell Eikonoklastes	116		
Liberal Democrats	Kathryn Gagen	71		
TUSC	Neil Cussons	51		
Majority		674		
Turnout		5,266	31.93	
Morley Borough Independent hold		Swing		

=== May 2012 ===
2012
Party	Candidate	Votes	%	±%
Morley Borough Independent	Judith Elliott*	2,690	50.0	+17.4
Labour	Kathryn Rose	1,507	28.0	−5.5
English Democrat	Chris Beverley	811	15.1	−4.5
Conservative	John McKee	376	7.0	−4.6
Majority		1,183	22.0	+21.2
Turnout		5,384		
Morley Borough Independent hold		Swing	+11.4	

=== May 2011 ===
2011
Party	Candidate	Votes	%	±%
Labour	Neil Dawson	2,129	33.4	+9.9
Morley Borough Independent	Terry Grayshon*	2,076	32.6	+5.9
English Democrat	Chris Beverley	1,245	19.6	+19.6
Conservative	Neil Hunt	736	11.6	−6.2
Liberal Democrats	Robert Jacques	180	2.8	−8.0
Majority		53	0.8	−2.4
Turnout		6,366	38	
Labour gain from Morley Borough Independent		Swing	+2.0	

=== May 2010 ===
2010
Party	Candidate	Votes	%	±%
Morley Borough Independent	Shirley Varley	2,837	26.7	−17.0
Labour	Rob Wilkinson	2,497	23.5	+10.1
BNP	Chris Beverley*	2,246	21.2	−7.5
Conservative	Andrew Haigh	1,880	17.7	+9.4
Liberal Democrats	Rowena Skinner	1,149	10.8	+7.6
Majority		340	3.2	−11.9
Turnout		10,609	64.2	+26.5
Morley Borough Independent gain from BNP		Swing	-13.5	
