= Beggarington Hill =

Hamlet in West Yorkshire, England

Coordinates: 53.7161°N 1.5791°W

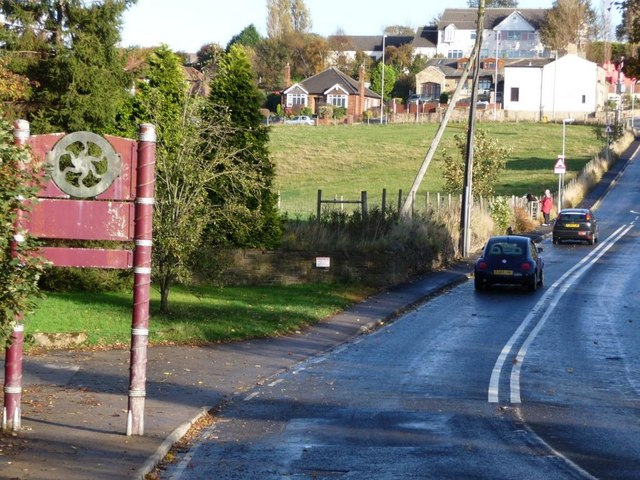
- Approach to Beggarington Hill on Hey Beck Lane

- Location within West Yorkshire
- OS grid reference: SE277245
- Metropolitan borough: City of Leeds
- Metropolitan county: West Yorkshire
- Region: Yorkshire and the Humber
- Country: England
- Sovereign state: United Kingdom
- Post town: WAKEFIELD
- Postcode district: WF3
- Police: West Yorkshire
- Fire: West Yorkshire
- Ambulance: Yorkshire

Beggarington Hill is a hamlet in the City of Leeds near its border with Kirklees in West Yorkshire, England. Historically, it was part of the West Ardsley civil parish. It is located immediately southwest of West Ardsley between the Baghill Beck and the Hey Beck. The A653 road runs approximately 0.6 miles (1.0 km) west of the settlement.

Woodkirk Mill, a corn mill, had fallen into disuse by 1930.
