= Heavy Woollen District =

Localised area of West Yorkshire

Coordinates: 53.593°N 1.801°W

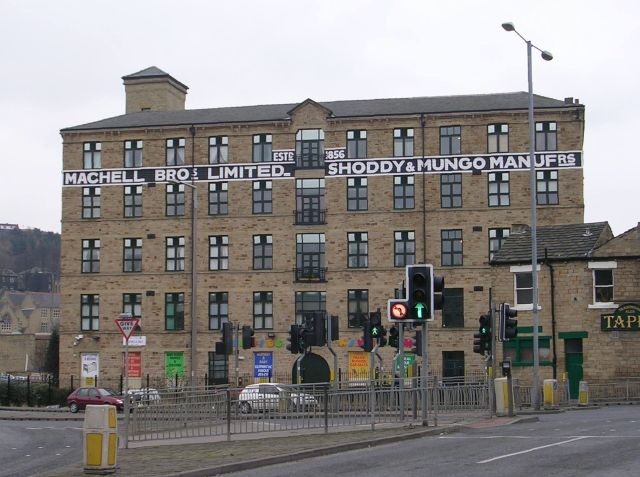
Machell's shoddy and mungo mill in Dewsbury has been converted to flats but retains its signs

The Heavy Woollen District is a region of textile-focused industrial development in West Yorkshire, England. It acquired the name because of the heavyweight cloth manufactured there from the early 19th century.

The district is made up of parts of the modern day boroughs of Kirklees, Leeds and Wakefield in West Yorkshire, England. Located around the towns of Dewsbury, Batley, Heckmondwike and Ossett, the area extends to the towns and villages of Liversedge, Gomersal, Gildersome, Birkenshaw, Mirfield, Cleckheaton, Morley, Tingley, East Ardsley, Birstall and Horbury. The manufacture of wool cloth for clothing, blankets, rope and twine continues in the district.

The area was one of the key textile centres in Yorkshire, famed for its production of shoddy and mungo. For years companies had tried to blend different fibres without success leading to the term, "munt go", i.e. "mustn't go" as a Yorkshire colloquialism. Machinery invented in Batley to grind soft rags (shoddy) is thought to have first been devised in 1813, and for hard rags (mungo) later on. Most mills have either closed or put to other uses, but some shoddy/mungo mills remain such as Edward Clay & Son Ltd. in Ossett.

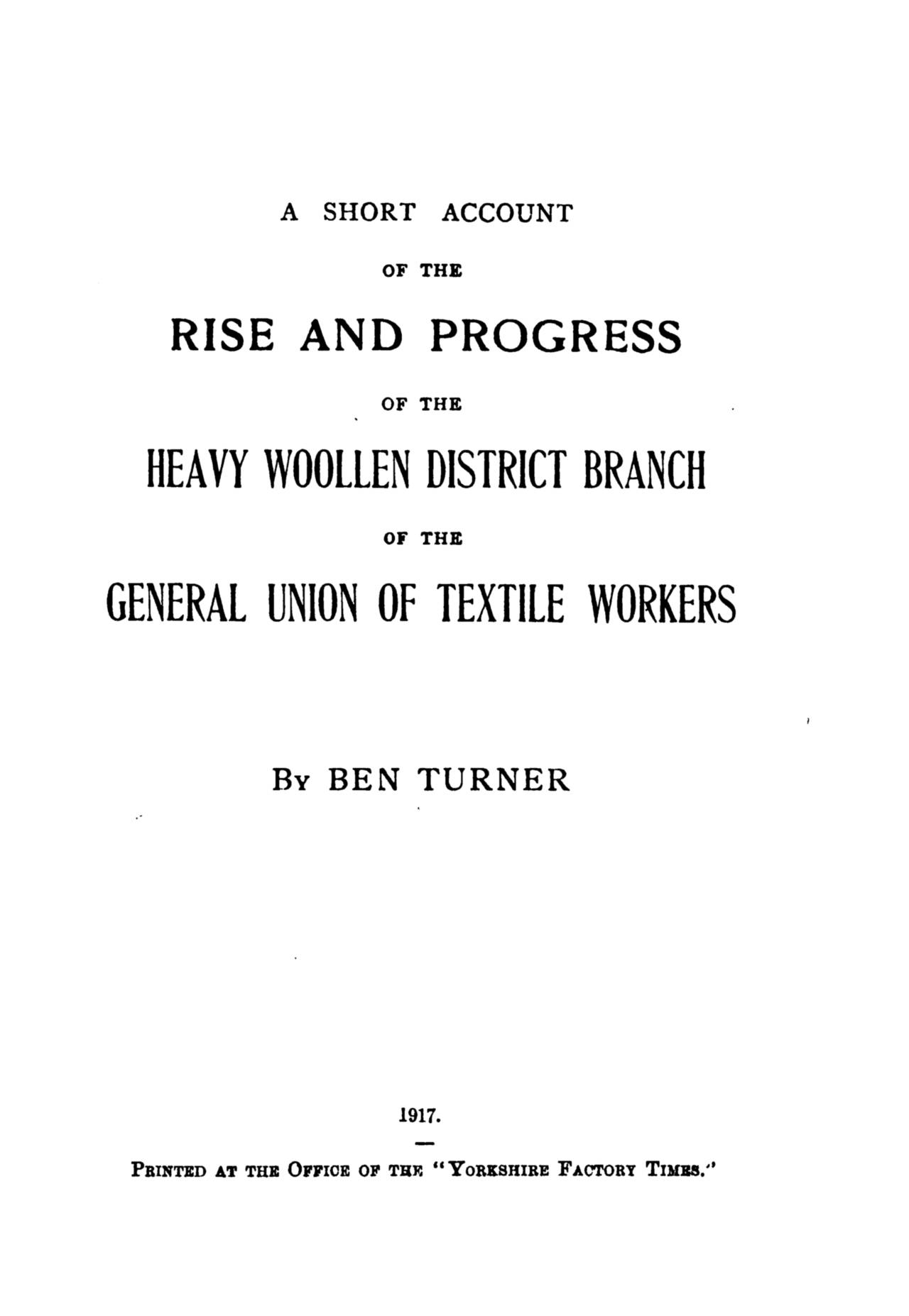
1917 book title page confirming the term "Heavy Woollen District" as used historically around West Yorkshire. The book was written by union official Ben Turner, who later was known as Sir Ben Turner, MP (Member of Parliament) for Batley and Morley.

== History ==
The Heavy Woollen District branch of the General Union of Textile Workers was formed in 1892 to service the needs of the local population. The union produced a publication entitled Heavy Woollen District Textile Record, as a newsletter for distribution to members by the union's local collectors of subscriptions.

A contingent from churches within the Roman Catholic Diocese of Leeds visited cemeteries in France where the remains of 25 fallen soldiers from the Heavy Woollen District during World War I and World War II are interred. Dewsbury Cemetery has a memorial dedicated to four soldiers who died at the Heavy Woollen District Military Hospital, Staincliffe, Dewsbury, from injuries sustained during WW1.

== Transport ==
The area was served by the Yorkshire (Woollen District) Electric Tramways between 1903 and 1934, which were replaced with buses operated by Yorkshire Woollen District Transport company.

== Sport ==
There is still a Heavy Woollen District football association and junior cricket association, both with representative teams. The cricket league originally defined the district as within a six-mile radius of Batley Town Hall, but this was extended to an eighteen-mile radius. The 'Heavy Woollen District Cricket Challenge Cup' was first competed for in 1883.

== See also ==
- Agbrigg and Morley
