= Listed buildings in Leeds (Ardsley and Robin Hood Ward) =

Ardsley and Robin Hood is a ward in the metropolitan borough of the City of Leeds, West Yorkshire, England. It contains 16 listed buildings that are recorded in the National Heritage List for England. Of these, three are listed at Grade II*, the middle of the three grades, and the others are at Grade II, the lowest grade. The ward contains the settlements of East Ardsley, Lofthouse, Robin Hood, Thorpe on the Hill, and West Ardsley, and the surrounding area. Most of the listed buildings are houses and cottages, farm houses and farm buildings, and the others are a church, memorials in the churchyard, and a former textile mill.

== Key ==
Grade	Criteria
II*	Particularly important buildings of more than special interest
II	Buildings of national importance and special interest

== Buildings ==
Name and location	Photograph	Date	Notes	Grade
Haigh Hall; 53.71191°N 1.57142°W	—	Mid 16th century	A house later extended and divided into two, it is timber framed and was encased in stone in 1768. The house has a plinth, quoins, bands, shaped gutter brackets, and a stone slate roof, hipped on the left. There are two storeys, four bays, two bays added to the right, and a two-bay rear wing. In the second bay is a doorway with a Gibbs surround, a pulvinated frieze, and a cornice, and above is a blocked window with a Gibbs surround and an apron. The other windows have flat heads and those in the ground floor have keystones. To the right is another doorway with a Gibbs surround, and a dated and initialled triple keystone, above which is a coat of arms.	II
Barn east of East Ardsley Old Hall; 53.72291°N 1.53769°W	—	Late 16th century	The barn is timber framed and was encased in stone probably in the early 18th century. It has quoins, a stone slate roof, and three bays. The barn contains a central cart entry flanked by rectangular vents.	II
East Ardsley Old Hall; 53.72289°N 1.53815°W		1622	The hall was extended in 1652 and later in the 17th century. It is in sandstone with stone slate roofs and two storeys. The front has an E-shaped plan, with a three-bay hall range, projecting gabled cross-wings, and a central two-storey porch. The hall has a plinth, quoins, and coped gables with kneelers and finials. The porch contains a doorway with a moulded surround, a Tudor arched head, and an inscribed lintel, above which is a carved Talbot dog in relief. Over this is a moulded band, and the upper storey is jettied. Most of the windows in the hall are mullioned and transomed. At the rear are three gables, and the middle bay projects.	II*
Thompson's Farmhouse; 53.72674°N 1.49532°W	—	Early 17th century	The farmhouse, which was later divided, is timber framed, encased in stone and brick and rendered. It has a stone slate roof, two storeys, and an L-shaped plan, consisting of a two-bay hall range with a continuous rear outshut, and a two-bay left cross-wing. In the wing are rusticated quoins, a band, and a doorway and a window with keystones. Most of the other openings have been altered.	II
Hopkinson's House; 53.72413°N 1.49625°W		17th century	Most of the house dates from about 1700, with an extension in the 18th century. It is in orange brick, partly rendered, with stone dressings, rendered sandstone in the right return, and a roof of blue Welsh slate, with stone slate on the north wing. There are three storeys, a double depth plan, three bays, and two-storey rear wings. The house has rusticated quoins, and a band. The openings have architraves, flat gauged arches and keystones, the windows are sashes, and there is a circular window.	II
Pymont House and Cottage; 53.73052°N 1.49680°W		Mid 17th century	A house, later divided, it is in red brick with a stone slate roof. There are two storeys and a U-shaped plan, consisting of a hall range, gabled cross-wings of different sizes, and a rear outshut. In the right angle is a porch that has an outer doorway with a chamfered surround and a depressed arch, above it is a large sandstone panel with worn carving, and a stepped parapet. Many of the windows are mullioned and transomed, and others have a single light, some inserted later.	II*
Casson memorials 53.72329°N 1.54344°W	—	c. 1667	The memorials are in the churchyard of St Michael's Church and consist of two grave slabs, the later one dated 1734, to the memory of two members of the Casson family. The memorial to Dorothy Casson has a decoratively carved base with raspberries and leaves, and that to Thomas Casson has a shield border and carved medallions.	II
Wilks memorial 53.72327°N 1.54353°W	—	c. 1691	The memorial is in the churchyard of St Michael's Church and consists of a grave slab to the memory of Margret Wilks. It has an enriched border with an elongated guilloché design.	II
Former barn at 183b Haigh Moor Road; 53.71447°N 1.57085°W	—	1749	A field barn with a hayloft above, converted for residential use, it is in stone with quoins and stone slate roof. The building contains doorways, one of which has an inscribed lintel, windows, and loft openings.	II
Thorpe Hall; 53.73857°N 1.52230°W	—	1739	A large house incorporating earlier material, it is in red brick with sandstone dressings, rendered on the ground floor, with rusticated quoins, a floor band, moulded gutter brackets, and a hipped slate roof. There are three storeys, a double-depth plan, five bays in the front and left return, three bays in the right return, and a rear service wing. In the front and in the left bay is a doorway, each with a moulded architrave, and a pediment on scrolled consoles. The windows have architraves; some are sashes, some are blocked, some have been altered, and in the right return is a Venetian stair window.	II*
25 and 27 Baghill Road, West Ardsley; 53.71924°N 1.58136°W	—	Late 18th century	A pair of stone cottages with quoins, shaped gutter brackets, and a stone slate roof with a coped gable on the left. There are two storeys and two bays. The paired central doorways share a common jamb and have flat-arched lintels. The windows are mullioned, with two lights in the ground floor and three in the upper floor.	II
Boyle Hall; 53.71823°N 1.56959°W		1799	A house that was extended in 1888, and later divided into flats. It is in stone with quoins, moulded gutter brackets, and a hipped stone slate roof. There are three storeys and symmetrical front of three bays. The central doorway has an architrave, an entablature and a dentilled cornice, and the windows have plain surrounds. Between the windows is an oval inscribed plaque. The entrance at the rear has a doorway with a carved surround, an entablature and a cornice.	II
Black Gates House; 53.72965°N 1.56097°W		Late 18th to early 19th century (probable)	A house, later used for other purposes, in stone with quoins, bands, a moulded gutter and a Welsh blue slate roof with coped gables. There are two storeys and an attic, and a symmetrical front of five bays. The central doorway has engaged Tuscan columns, an entablature and a triangular pediment. The window above has an architrave, a pulvinated frieze and a cornice, and the other windows have plain surrounds. In the attic of the left return is a Diocletian window.	II
The Old Vicarage; 53.72274°N 1.54425°W	—	1846	A house, previously the vicarage to St Michael's Church, it is in stone on a plinth, with angle buttresses, a string course, gutter brackets, and a blue Welsh slate roof with coped gables and kneelers. There are two storeys and an attic, and three bays. The middle bay projects, and is gabled. It contains a doorway with a pointed arch and a dated and installed hood mould, above which is a stepped mullioned and transomed window, and an arched lancet window in the attic. In the outer bays are mullioned and transomed windows, and on the left return is a canted bay window. The right return contains a flat roofed bay window in the first bay, and in the upper floor of the second bay is an oriel window.	II
St Michael's Church; 53.72343°N 1.54358°W		1880–81	The church was designed by W. Swinden Barber in Perpendicular style, reusing the Norman doorway of a previous church. It is built in stone with roofs of blue Welsh slate, and consists of a nave with a clerestory, north and south aisles, a south porch, a chancel, a south vestry, and a west tower. The tower has four stages, angle buttresses, an octagonal stair turret with a weathervane rising above the tower, clock faces on three sides, and an embattled parapet. In the porch is the re-used Norman doorway, with three orders. The porch has a coped gable and a hood mould above the doorway.	II
Ardsley Mill, Engine House and Chimney; 53.72700°N 1.55107°W		1912	A steam powered worsted spinning mill later used for other purposes, it is in reinforced concrete with brick infill, and has a curved and wavy parapet, and a flat roof. There are two storeys and a basement, a front of three bays and 17 bays along the sides. Each bay contains three windows with brick dividing piers. On the front between the floors is lettering. On the northwest side is a four-storey tower, and in the southeast front are loading bays on three floors. In the centre of this front is a two-storey engine house, a boiler house, and a circular chimney.	II
