= Eric Fisk =

English cricketer and Royal Air Force officer

Personal information
- Full name: Eric Fisk
- Born: 27 March 1931 (age 95); East Ardsley, Yorkshire, England
- Batting: Left-handed
- Bowling: Slow left-arm orthodox

Career statistics
Competition	First-class
Matches	3
Runs scored	37
Batting average	7.40
100s/50s	–/–
Top score	16
Balls bowled	289
Wickets	2
Bowling average	61.50
5 wickets in innings	–
10 wickets in match	–
Best bowling	1/19
Catches/stumpings	1/–
- Source: Cricinfo, 2 March 2019

Eric Fisk (born 27 March 1931) is an English former first-class cricketer and Royal Air Force officer.

While undertaking his National Service in the Royal Air Force, Fisk made three appearances in first-class cricket for the Combined Services cricket team. The first of these came against Essex in 1950 at Chelmsford, with his remaining appearances coming in 1951 against Glamorgan at Pontypridd, and Warwickshire at Edgbaston. He scored 37 run across his three matches, with a high score of 16, while with the ball he took 2 wickets. He also played for the Yorkshire Second XI from 1948–1954, making 29 appearances.

Fisk married his wife Mavis in January 1955, with the couple having two sons. The couple celebrated their diamond wedding anniversary in January 2015.
