= Morley and Outwood =

UK Parliament constituency (2010–2024)

- Former county constituency for the House of Commons
- 2010–2024 boundary of Morley and Outwood in West Yorkshire

- Location of West Yorkshire within England
- County: West Yorkshire
- Electorate: 78,803 (December 2019)

2010–2024
- Seats: One
- Created from: Morley and Rothwell; Normanton
- Replaced by: Leeds South West and Morley

Morley and Outwood was a constituency (Note: A county constituency (for the purposes of election expenses and type of returning officer).) in West Yorkshire represented in the House of Commons of the UK Parliament. (Note: As with all constituencies, the constituency elects one Member of Parliament (MP) by the first past the post system of election at least every five years.)

Further to the completion of the 2023 Periodic Review of Westminster constituencies, the seat was abolished. Subject to boundary changes – losing the City of Wakefield wards, incorporating the district of Outwood and gaining the City of Leeds ward of Farnley and Wortley – it was reformed as Leeds South West and Morley and first contested at the 2024 general election.

== History ==
=== Forerunners and boundaries ===
The Morley and Outwood constituency was first contested in 2010. It consisted of the town of Morley, in the City of Leeds metropolitan district, and around Outwood in the City of Wakefield district. It was largely a successor to the previous Morley and Rothwell seat, which existed from 1997 until 2010; Rothwell was transferred to a new Elmet and Rothwell seat, while Outwood was previously part of the abolished Normanton constituency. At the same time, the Leeds suburb of Middleton was transferred to Leeds Central. The remainder of the former Normanton constituency was divided between the Normanton, Pontefract and Castleford constituency and the Wakefield constituency.

=== Political history ===
At the 2010 general election, Morley and Outwood was won by Ed Balls of the Labour Party, who had been MP for Normanton since 2005, and served as Labour's Shadow Chancellor of the Exchequer from 2011 to 2015. Balls narrowly lost the seat at the 2015 general election to the Conservative Party candidate Andrea Jenkyns which was described by Larry Elliott of The Guardian as a "Portillo moment". The 2015 general election result gave the Conservatives that year their sixth-most marginal majority of their 331 seats won, by percentage of majority. Third parties had not polled strongly in the seat to date — the combined votes of the two largest UK parties' candidates exceeded 72.9% of the total in 2010 and 2015, 97.4% in 2017, and 91.7% in 2019.

== Boundaries ==
Map of boundaries 2010-2024

Parliament approved the recommendation of the Boundary Commission's Fifth Periodic Review of Westminster constituencies to create this new ("cross-border") constituency as a consequence of West Yorkshire losing one parliamentary seat following more rapid population increase in other regions.

The constituency contained the following electoral wards:

- From the City of Leeds: Ardsley and Robin Hood; Morley North; Morley South.
- From the City of Wakefield: Stanley and Outwood East; Wrenthorpe and Outwood West.

== Members of Parliament ==
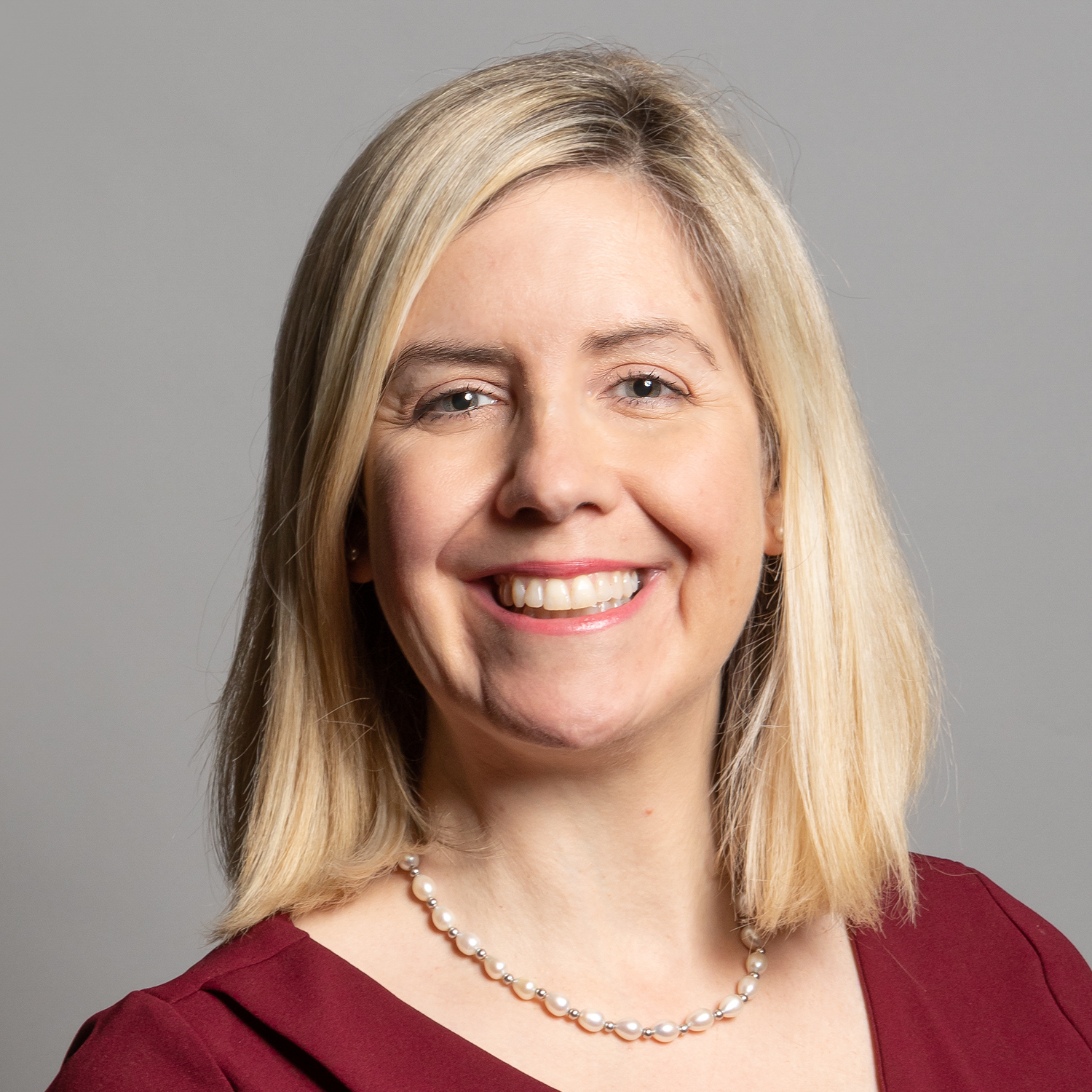
Andrea Jenkyns, Member of Parliament for Morley and Outwood from 2015 until the seat's abolition in 2024

Election	Member	Party
Created from Morley and Rothwell and Normanton
2010	Ed Balls	Labour Co-op
2015	Andrea Jenkyns	Conservative
2024	Constituency abolished	

== Election results 2010–2024 ==
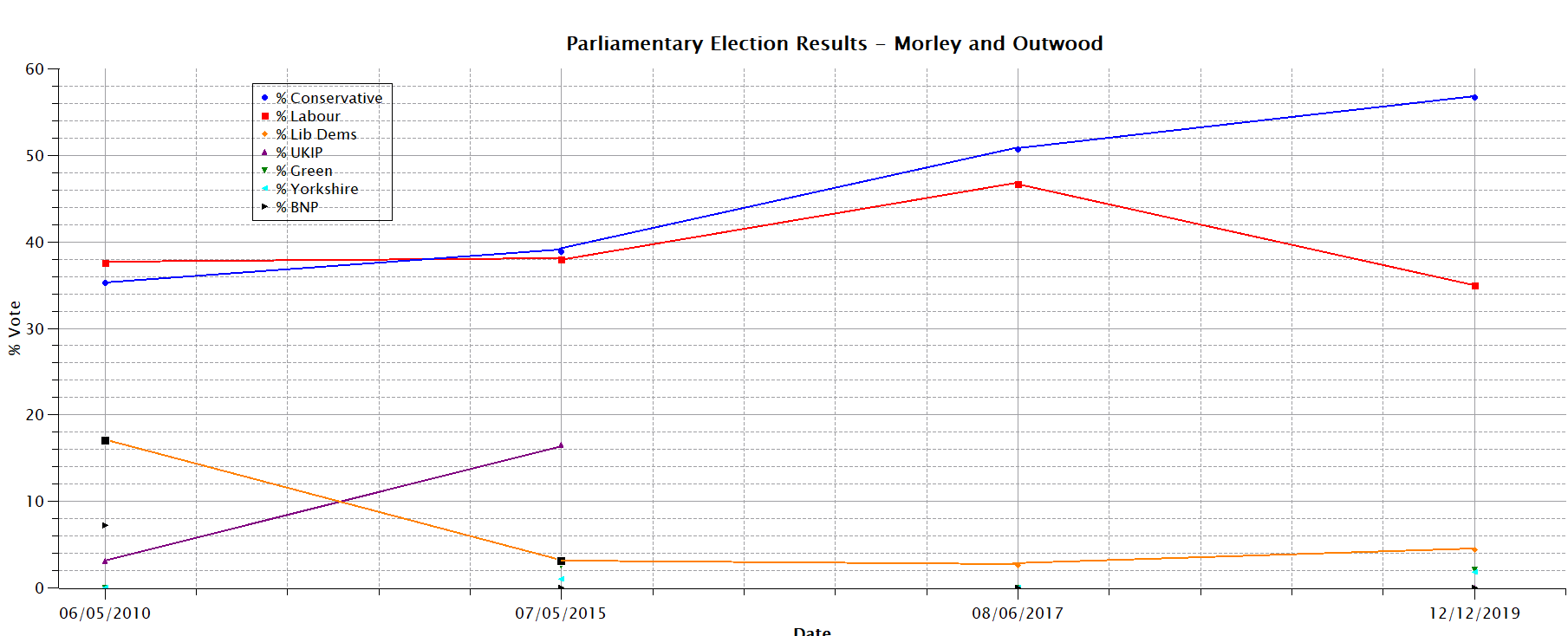
Election Results for the Morley and Outwood UK Parliamentary constituency at General Elections between 2010 and 2019

=== Elections in the 2010s ===
General election 2010: Morley and Outwood
Party	Candidate	Votes	%	±%
Labour Co-op	Ed Balls	18,365	37.6	−8.4
Conservative	Antony Calvert	17,264	35.3	+10.3
Liberal Democrats	James Monaghan	8,186	16.8	+6.7
BNP	Chris Beverley	3,535	7.2	−0.6
UKIP	David Daniel	1,505	3.1	New
Majority		1,101	2.3	−18.7
Turnout		48,855	65.8	
Labour Co-op win (new seat)				

General election 2015: Morley and Outwood
Party	Candidate	Votes	%	±%
Conservative	Andrea Jenkyns	18,776	38.9	+3.6
Labour Co-op	Ed Balls	18,354	38.0	+0.4
UKIP	David Dews	7,951	16.5	+13.4
Liberal Democrats	Rebecca Taylor	1,426	3.0	−13.8
Green	Martin Hemingway	1,264	2.6	New
Yorkshire First	Arnie Craven	479	1.0	New
Majority		422	0.9	N/A
Turnout		48,250	63.3	−2.5
Conservative gain from Labour Co-op		Swing	+1.6	

General election 2017: Morley and Outwood
Party	Candidate	Votes	%	±%
Conservative	Andrea Jenkyns	26,550	50.7	+11.8
Labour Co-op	Neil Dawson	24,446	46.7	+8.7
Liberal Democrats	Craig Dobson	1,361	2.6	−0.4
Majority		2,104	4.0	+3.1
Turnout		52,357	68.0	+4.7
Conservative hold		Swing	+1.6	

General election 2019: Morley and Outwood
Party	Candidate	Votes	%	±%
Conservative	Andrea Jenkyns	29,424	56.7	+6.0
Labour	Deanne Ferguson	18,157	35.0	−11.7
Liberal Democrats	Craig Dobson	2,285	4.4	+1.8
Green	Chris Bell	1,107	2.1	New
Yorkshire	Dan Woodlock	957	1.8	New
Majority		11,267	21.7	+17.7
Turnout		51,930	65.9	−2.1
Conservative hold		Swing	+8.8	

== See also ==
- List of parliamentary constituencies in West Yorkshire
- Leeds South East
- Morley and Leeds South
- Morley and Rothwell
- Elmet and Rothwell
