= Leeds South West and Morley =

UK Parliament constituency (since 2024)

Coordinates: 53.75°N 1.59°W

- Borough constituency for the House of Commons
- Interactive map of boundaries since 2024
- Boundary within Yorkshire and the Humber
- County: West Yorkshire
- Electorate: 71,376
- Major settlements: Leeds (part), Morley, Tingley

Current constituency
- Created: 2024
- Member of Parliament: Mark Sewards (Labour)
- Seats: One
- Created from: Morley and Outwood; Leeds West

Leeds South West and Morley is a constituency of the House of Commons in the UK Parliament. It was created by the 2023 periodic review of Westminster constituencies and first contested in the 2024 general election. It is currently represented by Mark Sewards of the Labour Party.

== Constituency profile ==
Leeds South West and Morley is a constituency in West Yorkshire. It covers some western neighbourhoods of the city of Leeds (Farnley and Wortley) and the outlying towns and villages of Morley, Tingley, East Ardsley, Lofthouse, Robin Hood, Gildersome and Drighlington. The area forms part of the Heavy Woollen District, traditionally a centre for textile manufacturing known for its production of recycled wool. Coal mining was also a significant local industry. The constituency has average levels of wealth; there is high deprivation in Farnley whilst the outlying villages are more affluent. House prices are similar to the rest of Yorkshire and lower than the national average.

Compared to the rest of the country, residents of Leeds South West and Morley have average levels of education, homeownership, income and professional employment. A high proportion of residents work in business administration and retail. White people made up 91% of the population at the 2021 census. At the local city council, Farnley, Wortley and the villages in the east of the constituency are represented by the Labour Party whilst Morley and its surroundings elected the localist Morley Borough Independents. An estimated 59% of voters in the constituency supported leaving the European Union in the 2016 referendum, higher than the nationwide figure of 52%.

== Boundaries ==
The constituency is composed of the following electoral wards of the City of Leeds:

- Ardsley & Robin Hood, Farnley & Wortley, Morley North, and Morley South.

It comprises the following areas of the City of Leeds:

Areas	Wards	Former constituency
Morley	Morley North and Morley South	Morley and Outwood
Robin Hood, Tingley, East Ardsley, and West Ardsley	Ardsley & Robin Hood	Morley and Outwood
Farnley and Wortley	Farnley & Wortley	Leeds West

== Members of Parliament ==
Morley & Outwood prior to 2024

Election	Member	Party
2024	Mark Sewards	Labour

== Elections ==
=== Elections in the 2020s ===
General election 2024: Leeds South West and Morley
Party	Candidate	Votes	%	±%
Labour	Mark Sewards	17,681	44.0	+7.2
Conservative	Andrea Jenkyns	9,258	23.0	−30.1
Reform	James Kendall	8,187	20.4	+18.6
Green	Chris Bell	2,522	6.3	+3.0
Liberal Democrats	Michael Fox	1,798	4.5	+1.7
Yorkshire	Howard Graham Dews	664	1.7	−0.5
SDP	Nigel Perry	99	0.2	N/A
Majority		8,423	21.0	N/A
Turnout		40,209	56.0	−5.1
Registered electors		71,854		
Labour gain from Conservative		Swing	▲18.7	

=== Elections in the 2010s ===
2019 notional result
Party	Vote	%
Conservative	23,166	53.1
Labour	16,052	36.8
Green	1,440	3.3
Liberal Democrats	1,207	2.8
Others	957	2.2
Brexit Party	780	1.8
Turnout	43,602	61.1
Electorate	71,376	

== See also ==
- List of parliamentary constituencies in West Yorkshire
- List of parliamentary constituencies in the Yorkshire and the Humber (region)
