= Tingley =

Village and suburb in West Yorkshire, England

Coordinates: 53.728°N 1.584°W

- Location within West Yorkshire
- Population: 7,652
- OS grid reference: SE279262
- Metropolitan borough: City of Leeds
- Metropolitan county: West Yorkshire
- Region: Yorkshire and the Humber
- Country: England
- Sovereign state: United Kingdom
- Post town: WAKEFIELD
- Postcode district: WF3
- Dialling code: 0113
- Police: West Yorkshire
- Fire: West Yorkshire
- Ambulance: Yorkshire

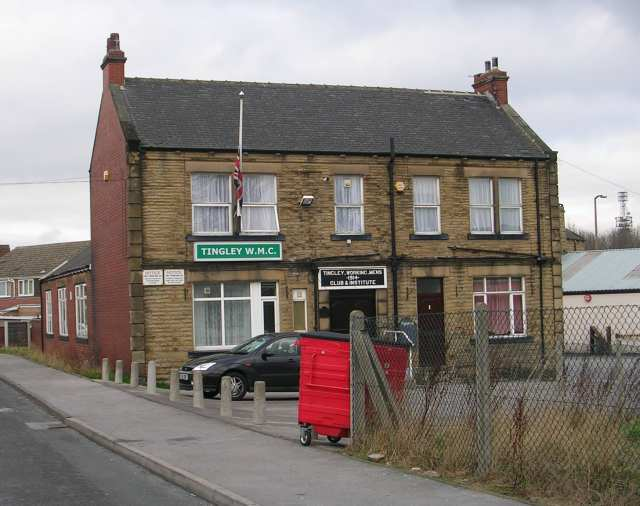
Tingley Working Men's Club, Highfield, Dewsbury Road

Tingley is a suburban village in the City of Leeds in West Yorkshire, Northern England, forming part of the parish of West Ardsley. Tingley forms part of the Heavy Woollen District. It is situated between the cities of Leeds and Wakefield.

Most of Tingley sits in the Ardsley and Robin Hood ward of Leeds City Council, whilst west Tingley forms part of Morley South ward. Both wards are part of the Leeds South West and Morley parliamentary constituency.

== Geography ==
Historically part of the West Riding of Yorkshire, Tingley is situated between Leeds, Wakefield and Bradford but considered part of Morley. It has the WF3 (Wakefield) postcode area while the area's telephone numbers use "0113", the Leeds prefix.

== Etymology ==
The name Tingley is first attested in the thirteenth century, and on through the Middle Ages, in forms such as Thing(e)law(e), and Tinglawe in 1608. The name comes from Old English þing ('meeting, assembly') and hlāw ('mound, hill, burial mound'). Thus it was probably the meeting place for Morley Wapentake.

Just to the north of Tingley, at the northern end of East and West Ardsley parish, lies Dunningley, whose name is first attested around 1200 in the forms Duninglau and Duninglaue. Like Tingley and Ardsley, this came comes from a personal name followed by Old English hlǣw ('hill, mound'). In this case the name was Dun, and was followed by the element -ing- which in this instance is an Old English suffix indicating the connection between the name-bearer and the landscape feature. Thus the name once meant 'Dun's hill' or 'Dun's (burial) mound'.

== Governance ==
Tingley was part of the Ardsley Urban district 1894–1937, which also included West Ardsley and East Ardsley and was then part of Morley Municipal borough 1937–1974. The village once formed part of the former Municipal Borough of Morley, and is still classed as part of Morley in the census. However, it is technically separate, and is not governed by Morley Town Council.

Tingley is split into two Leeds City Council wards, Morley South and Ardsley and Robin Hood. Both elect three city councillors to the council. It is in the Leeds South West and Morley parliamentary constituency.

== Culture and community ==
Until recently a semi-rural location, Tingley has seen much residential development over the last twenty-five years, while managing to keep most of its rural views, it is only five miles south of Leeds City Centre. Close by to the east along the A650 are West Ardsley and East Ardsley with Woodkirk to the south.

The coal and woollen industries which provided much employment in the area until well after World War II have now completely disappeared and Tingley is essentially a suburb. Within a five-mile radius of the settlement lie the city centres of Leeds and Wakefield and the town centres of Morley, Batley, Dewsbury and Ossett.

Tingley is home to Tingley Athletic JFC (junior football club). The club traditionally play in white and green stripes with black shorts and green socks, and have had a number of players go on to play at professional and semi-professional level. The club play at their home ground, The Crescent, this houses changing rooms, showers, two full-sized football pitches, a 3/4 sized football pitch, and 3 7 a-side football pitches.

Close by near the start of the A653 to Leeds City Centre is the main transmitter for Greatest Hits Radio West Yorkshire and the studios of Heart Yorkshire.

Residents shopping needs are mainly covered by the nearby White Rose Centre only minutes away in Beeston. The Leeds branch of the Big Motoring World chain of used car hypermarkets is also in Tingley, along with the South Leeds arm of Village Hotels.

Tingley has had several public houses, including the former White Bear, which prior to demolition was prominently located next to Tingley roundabout. The former Bull's Head (located at the crossroads of Dewsbury, Rein and Syke Road) and The Babes in the Wood off lower Dewsbury Road have both now also been closed. This leaves three local public houses, The British Oak off Westerton Road in Tingley, The New Scarborough on Dewsbury Road in Tingley and The Hare and Hounds off Heybeck Lane in West Ardsley.

Tingley has several places of worship, including Tingley Methodist Church, on Westerton Road next to Westerton Academy, Hope Church, currently on Heatherdale Road, and West Ardsley Methodist Church, on Haigh Moor Road just off Batley Road. The former Tingley Zion Methodist Church closed in 1997.

== Education ==
The immediate area is served by Westerton Primary Academy (formerly Westerton Primary School), Blackgates Primary School and Woodkirk Academy (formerly Woodkirk High School) whilst the wider local area includes Hill Top Academy in West Ardsley and The Morley Academy in nearby Morley.

== Transport ==
Tingley is perhaps best known for its eponymous roundabout, at the junction of the M62 motorway and the A653 (Dewsbury Road) and the A650 (Bradford Road). Until major traffic light and lane works were undertaken in the early 2000s, this roundabout was known as one of the worst in the Leeds area for accidents.

Tingley was originally intended to be home to the southern terminus of the main line of the now shelved, Leeds Supertram project.

== Railway past ==
Tingley was once served by its own railway station, which was located on the old now long closed ex-Great Northern railway line (Leeds, Bradford and Halifax Junction Railway) that ran from Ardsley Junction to Laisterdyke (outskirts of Bradford) and opened to traffic in 1857. The station was also a junction station on the also now closed Batley to Beeston loop line in-between.

Tingley railway station closed to passengers in 1954, and later to freight in 1964, with the line itself closing to all rail traffic in May 1969.

The railway station has long been demolished, along with the Dewsbury Road bridge abutment (to the west of the station itself). The formerly adjacent Station Lane, which leads off Dewsbury Road, once led up to the station. Along the former ex-Great Northern loop line towards Beeston Junction lies the now long disused Tingley Viaduct. This historic structure once carried the long closed-down Batley-Beeston loop line (across the present day Leeds-Doncaster line) en route.

== Notable people ==
In June 1980, Zigmund Adamski, a coal miner at Lofthouse Colliery approaching retirement, set off from Tingley to go shopping in Wakefield. He was never seen alive again. His body was found on top of a 10-foot-high (3.0 m) mound of coal near Todmorden. He had died of a heart attack. The police were unable to understand why and how he died. His death has been claimed to have the hallmarks of a UFO incident.

David Batty, who played for Leeds United and Newcastle United as well as England, is one of the most famous players to start off at Tingley Athletic.
