= Terry Durham =

English painter

Terry Durham (24 September 1936 – 6 December 2013) was an internationally known abstract and figurative artist and poet. Durham was born on 24 September 1936 in East Ardsley, West Yorkshire, where he spent his formative years, and died on 6 December 2013 in the town of Álora, Andalusia, Spain. Mostly self-taught, he studied and was greatly inspired by the works of Paul Klee and other European artists such as Picasso, Gauguin and Matisse. He attended the Leeds College of Art before pursuing painting as his profession.

== Early years ==
In 1960, Durham moved to St. Mary's, Isles of Scilly where he and his wife worked in the Atlantic Hotel for two years. There, he found inspiration in the rugged island landscape, and the sunny and temperate climate of the Islands produced "good conditions for painting". It was while working on the island and through his group of friends there that Durham heard of the growing art scene in London. After a short return to Yorkshire, he moved with his family to Beckenham, Kent in 1964.

== The 1960s and 1970s ==
While living in Beckenham, Durham got to know Nicholas Treadwell, and was one of the regular artists with work on "Nicholas Treadwell's Mobile Art Gallery", based in Croydon. He was one of the first artists to show at the Nicholas Treadwell Gallery on Chiltern Street in London when it opened in 1968. Durham's early London exhibitions were widely covered in the local press, bringing him into the media spotlight and to the attention of figures such as Bill Wyman, Muriel Spark, Lulu and Andrew Bown.

In the early 1970s, Durham moved back to Yorkshire, where he continued to work while holding exhibitions in London. He formed friendships with Stuart Walton, a local artist specialising in northern street scenes, and with Austin Mitchell, who was at that time the presenter of the Yorkshire TV news programme Calendar.

One of his paintings was analysed by biologist and science historian Jacob Bronowski in an episode of the 1973 television series The Ascent of Man and the accompanying book:

The first question we ask is, is the human brain a better computer - a more complex computer? Of course, artists in particular tend to think of the brain as a computer. So in his "Portrait of Dr Bronowski" Terry Durham has symbols of the spectrum and the computer, because that is how an artist imagines a scientist's brain. But of course that cannot be right. If the brain were a computer, then it would be carrying out a pre-wired set of actions in an inflexible sequence.

In the mid-1970s, Terry Durham produced the first of a series of children's art books, based on a character of his own creation named Angus Pangus. It was a black on white line drawing work produced and printed in limited edition by Robin Alston at the Janus Press in Ilkley.

== 1980s to 2000 ==
In 1993, Durham moved with his family to the Algarve, southern Portugal, where he lived for 11 years. During his time there, in addition to painting professionally, he had many successful exhibitions, was employed regularly as a mural painter and performed as vocalist for a rock and blues band. He was particularly inspired by the people, climate, colours, landscape and architecture of southern Portugal.

During this time, Durham also had several international exhibitions, including five in Berlin and one on the island of Jersey. One of his "Yellow Bird Walking" series is displayed in Rickenbakers Music Inn in Berlin and while he was there he met one of his jazz heroes, Coco Schumann, who expressed a great appreciation of and fondness for his work.

In 2003, Durham moved to Porto Seguro in the Bahia municipality of north-east Brazil, the vibrant colours, wildlife and tribal cultures of which influenced the paintings and sketches he would complete both during his time there and across the rest of his life.

As well as spending his time painting and travelling, he was commissioned by a Portuguese and Jamaican themed beach restaurant and music venue, That Shack, to decorate the venue with murals.

== Music and poetry ==
Music and poetry were also important to Durham, and he formed a musical group called Storyteller with Roger Moon, Mike Rogers and Caroline Attard. Storyteller toured local jazz and folk clubs and were signed by Transatlantic Records. They recorded two albums: Storyteller, produced by Peter Frampton and More Pages. The group appeared on the same bill as The Humblebums (Gerry Rafferty and Billy Connolly), Hawkwind, and Vinegar Joe (Elkie Brooks and Robert Palmer). Storyteller also appeared as a support act for a UK tour by Ralph McTell, beginning at the Royal Festival Hall, London, shortly after which they split up.

Durham went on to record his only solo album, ‘Crystal Telephone’, which was issued in June 1969 on Deram Records (one of Decca Records’ subsidiary labels). It had musical arrangements by John Coleman and featured the saxophonist Evan Parker. It was re-released in 2005, and the track "Dreams Of Tomorrow In Every Language" was played on the Stuart Maconie Radio 6 Music Show Freakier Zone in 2012. Crystal Telephone has been described as "a wonderfully different album", "Yorkshire's answer to Serge Gainsbourg" and "a beautiful piece of poetry and music - a very unique balsam for the soul".

== Later life ==
Durham lived and worked in Álora, Andalusia from 2007 until his death on 6 December 2013. He had major individual and combined exhibitions in both Álora and Malaga, and participated in regional art competitions. When not painting professionally he taught art classes for children and adults. His work was displayed in various establishments in Álora as murals and caricatures, and he was known in the area as "el artista" (the artist) or "el maestro" (the teacher).
