= West Ardsley =

Area of Leeds, West Yorkshire, England

Coordinates: 53.714°N 1.521°W

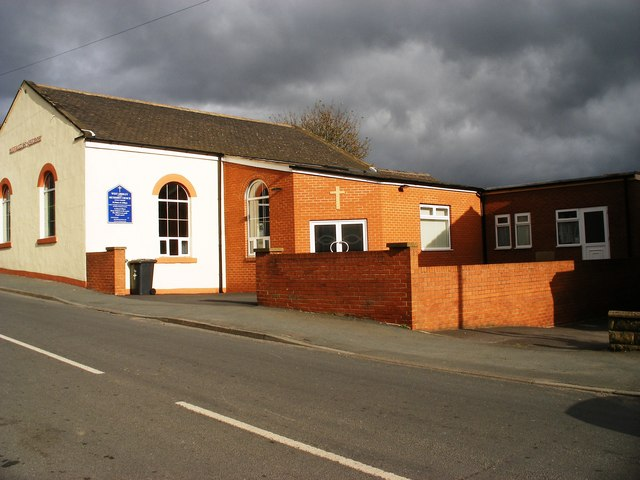
- West Ardsley Methodist Church

- Location within West Yorkshire
- Population: 5,994
- OS grid reference: SE277250
- Metropolitan borough: City of Leeds
- Metropolitan county: West Yorkshire
- Region: Yorkshire and the Humber
- Country: England
- Sovereign state: United Kingdom
- Post town: WAKEFIELD
- Postcode district: WF3
- Dialling code: 0113
- Police: West Yorkshire
- Fire: West Yorkshire
- Ambulance: Yorkshire

West Ardsley is a settlement on the south-west edge of the City of Leeds metropolitan borough, in the county of West Yorkshire, England. Historically part of the West Riding of Yorkshire, it roughly approximates to an amalgamation of Tingley, Woodkirk, Hill Top, Upper Green, Common Side, Beggarington Hill and a number of other hamlets. The parish church is situated at Woodkirk and Methodist church on Haigh Moor Road. Being located midway between several towns, West Ardsley has become a dormitory settlement.

== Etymology ==
The name Ardsley is first attested in the Domesday Book as Erdeslau and Eadeslauue, apparently with reference to what is now East Ardsley. The first time the name is used with reference to West Ardsley seems to be in the period 1138–47, in the form Erdislaw.

The first element of the name comes from the Old English personal name Eard, a nickname form of longer names like Eardwulf, in the genitive form Eardes ('Eard's'). The second element comes from Old English hlǣw ('hill, mound'). Thus the name once meant 'Eard's hill' or 'Eard's mound'. The name first appears with the element west in 1400, in the forms Westardeslawe and Westardeslowe.

In Arthur Mee's The King's England series, he wrote that Woodkirk was "sometimes called 'West Ardsley'." This was incorrect, yet Woodkirk was the centre of the parish, as it had the church.

== Location and boundaries ==
West Ardsley appears on Ordnance Survey 1:50,000 map sheet 104. However, the nearby settlement of East Ardsley (or Ardsley East) is in larger print. In truth, although there are many roadsigns pointing to "West Ardsley" and some clubs and local organisations refer to it in their name, there is no one single, self-contained area with the name. The hamlets of Tingley, Hill Top, Upper Green and Common Side have merged through urban sprawl whilst Woodkirk remains isolated. The post office took the decision to classify all addresses in the former area as "Tingley, Wakefield" whilst Woodkirk remains separate and comes under Dewsbury's address.

Possessing a WF postcode in the WF3 (Wakefield) postcode area while the village telephone numbers are "0113", the Leeds prefix.

In 1931 the civil parish had a population of 4255. On 1 April 1937 the parish was abolished and merged with Morley. West Ardsley was part of the Ardsley Urban district 1894–1937, which also included Tingley and East Ardsley and was then part of Morley Municipal borough 1937–1974. The village once formed part of the former Municipal Borough of Morley, and is still classed as part of Morley in the census. However, it is technically separate, and is not governed by Morley Town Council.

The area sits in the Ardsley and Robin Hood ward of Leeds City Council – which elects three city councillors – and the Leeds South West and Morley parliamentary constituency.

There is a historic parish of West Ardsley, whose parish boundaries all fall within the "Ardsley and Robin Hood" ward.

== Transport ==
The village is situated nearby Tingley roundabout at the junction of the M62 motorway and the A653 (Dewsbury Road) and the A650 (Bradford Road) leading to the M1 motorway in East Ardsley.

The village along with its more widely known neighbour of East Ardsley were formerly served by Ardsley railway station, in addition to Tingley railway station close by. Tingley Station closed to passengers in 1954, and later to freight in 1964, with Ardsley's entire station closing that same year, Tingley followed suit in May 1969 ceasing all rail traffic.

The current closest stations are Wakefield Westgate station, Wakefield Kirkgate station and Morley railway station.

== Education ==
The immediate area is served by Westerton Primary Academy (formerly Westerton Primary School), Hill Top Academy (formerly Hill Top Primary School) and Blackgates Primary School. Woodkirk Academy (formerly Woodkirk High) serves as the areas local secondary school.

== Lee Gap Horse Fair ==
West Ardsley is the home of the annual Lee Gap fair – a historic horse fair originally chartered by King Stephen in 1139 – which makes it reputedly England's oldest horse fair. The fair used to stretch over a period of two weeks, but as the horse trade diminished, it now takes place on only the first and last days of said fortnight – known as "First o'Lee" and "Latter Lee". Today, attendees are mainly Gypsies and Travellers among some local residents.

== See also ==
- Listed buildings in Leeds (Ardsley and Robin Hood Ward)
