= Agbrigg and Morley =

Wapentake of the West Riding of Yorkshire, England

Coordinates: 53.781°N 1.608°W

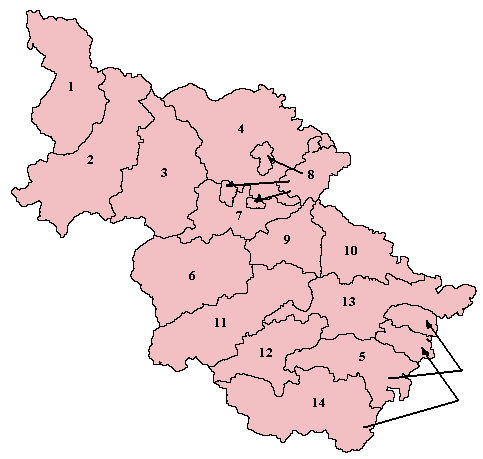
Wapentakes of the West Riding. Agbrigg is labelled 11 on the map, and Morley is labelled 6.

Agbrigg and Morley was a wapentake of the West Riding of Yorkshire, England. The main purpose of the wapentake was the administration of justice by a local court. At the time of the Domesday survey in 1086, Agbrigg and Morley were separate wapentakes. For example, Methley was in Agbrigg, while Rothwell was in Morley.

The wapentakes were probably combined by the 13th century when similar administrative reforms occurred elsewhere in England. It was kept in two divisions, which in the mid-nineteenth century again became wapentakes in their own right.

The Agbrigg Division included the parishes of Almondbury, Emley, Kirkburton, Kirkheaton, Normanton, Rothwell, Sandal Magna, Thornhill, Wakefield and Warmfield with Heath and parts of Batley, Dewsbury, Featherstone, Huddersfield and Rochdale. The Morley Division included Birstall, Bradford, Calverley and parts of Batley, Huddersfield and Dewsbury.
