= East Ardsley =

Village in West Yorkshire, England

Coordinates: 53.7250°N 1.5392°W

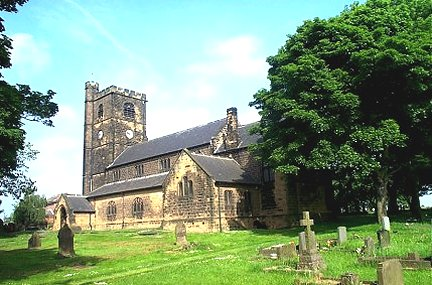
- St Michael's parish church, East Ardsley

- Location within West Yorkshire
- OS grid reference: SE305255
- Metropolitan borough: City of Leeds
- Metropolitan county: West Yorkshire
- Region: Yorkshire and the Humber
- Country: England
- Sovereign state: United Kingdom
- Post town: Wakefield
- Postcode district: WF3
- Dialling code: 0113/01924
- Police: West Yorkshire
- Fire: West Yorkshire
- Ambulance: Yorkshire
- UK Parliament: Leeds South West and Morley

East Ardsley is a village in the City of Leeds metropolitan borough, in West Yorkshire, England. East Ardsley forms part of the Heavy Woollen District and sits within the Rhubarb Triangle.

== Etymology ==
The name Ardsley is first attested in the Domesday Book of 1086 as Erdeslau and Eadeslauue, apparently primarily with reference to what is now East Ardsley as opposed to West Ardsley.

The first element of the name comes from the Old English personal name Eard, a nickname form of longer names like Eardwulf, in the genitive form Eardes ('Eard's'). The second element comes from Old English hlǣw ('hill, mound'). Thus the name once meant 'Eard's hill' or 'Eard's mound'. The name first appears with the element east in 1459, in the forms Est Ardeslaw and East Ardeslawe.

== Location ==
Historically part of the West Riding of Yorkshire, it is 6 miles (10 km) south of Leeds city centre and 2 miles (3 km) north of the City of Wakefield. Being between several towns, East Ardsley has become a dormitory village. The village is about 460 feet (140 m) above sea level and is more widely known than its neighbour West Ardsley.

Although it is in the City of Leeds metropolitan district, the village is in Wakefield's WF3 postcode district and its telephone numbers have both the 0113 Leeds and 01924 Wakefield dialling code. In 1931 the civil parish had a population of 4961. On 1 April 1937 the parish was abolished and merged with Morley and Stanley. East Ardsley was part of Ardsley Urban district 1894–1937, which also included Tingley and West Ardsley, and was then part of Morley Municipal borough 1937–1974. The village is still classed as part of Morley in the census, but it is not governed by Morley Town Council.

East Ardsley sits in the Ardsley and Robin Hood ward of Leeds City Council – which elects three city councillors – and the Leeds South West and Morley parliamentary constituency.

== History ==
East Ardsley once had a diverse economy, including agriculture, textiles, railways and coal-mining. Its coal mine closed in 1968 – the same year that the nearby Middleton pit closed. On the site of the old pit head now stands the headquarters of Sharp Business Systems, the UK arm of Sharp Corporation, which supplies and services photocopiers. The village had many co-op departments all of which are now closed.

Amblers Mill is at the crossroads of the A650 Bradford Road, Westerton Road and Common Lane. The building has ceased textile production and now houses Country Baskets. In 2007 the former railway sidings site started to be redeveloped for housing. The owners of the Country Baskets wholesaler were both killed in a helicopter accident on Saturday 26 January 2008.

The M62 and M1 motorways intersect near here. The main A650 road from Wakefield to Bradford also goes through the village. The Bay Horse Pub, a long-standing and historical part of East Ardsley can be found on Bradford Road.

The village was also formerly served by Ardsley railway station.

The village contains a somewhat sizeable church, in which are a rare rank of Bells which play occasionally.

The entertainer Ernie Wise was brought up in East Ardsley.

== Notable people ==
- Ernie Wise (born 1925), comedian
- Eric Fisk (born 1931), first-class cricketer
- Terry Durham (born 1936), artist and poet

== See also ==
- Listed buildings in Leeds (Ardsley and Robin Hood Ward)
