= Ardsley and Robin Hood (ward) =

Electoral ward in Leeds, England

- Ardsley and Robin Hood highlighted within Leeds
- Population: 17,762 (2023 electorate)
- Metropolitan borough: City of Leeds
- Metropolitan county: West Yorkshire
- Region: Yorkshire and the Humber
- Country: England
- Sovereign state: United Kingdom
- UK Parliament: Leeds South West and Morley
- Councillors: Karen Bruce (Labour); Stephen Holroyd (Labour); Robert Jagger (Labour)

Ardsley and Robin Hood is an electoral ward of Leeds City Council in the south of Leeds, West Yorkshire, covering suburb areas and villages including Robin Hood, Tingley and West and East Ardsley.

== Councillors ==
| Election | Councillor | Councillor | Councillor |
|---|---|---|---|
| 2004 | Karen Renshaw (Lab) | Jack Dunn (Lab) (Note: Dunn had served as a ward councillor for Middleton ward since 1996.) | Lisa Mulherin (Lab) |
| 2006 | Karen Renshaw (Lab) | Jack Dunn (Lab) | Lisa Mulherin (Lab) |
| 2007 | Karen Renshaw (Lab) | Jack Dunn (Lab) | Lisa Mulherin (Lab) |
| 2008 | Karen Renshaw (Lab) | Jack Dunn (Lab) | Lisa Mulherin (Lab) |
| 2010 | Karen Renshaw (Lab) | Jack Dunn (Lab) | Lisa Mulherin (Lab) |
| 2011 | Karen Renshaw (Lab) | Jack Dunn (Lab) | Lisa Mulherin (Lab) |
| 2012 | Karen Renshaw (Lab) | Jack Dunn (Lab) | Lisa Mulherin (Lab) |
| 2014 | Karen Renshaw (Lab) | Jack Dunn (Lab) | Lisa Mulherin (Lab) |
| 2015 | Karen Renshaw (Lab) | Jack Dunn (Lab) | Lisa Mulherin (Lab) |
| 2016 | Karen Renshaw (Lab) | Jack Dunn (Lab) | Lisa Mulherin (Lab) |
| January 2018 | Karen Renshaw (Lab) | Jack Dunn (Ind) (Note: Having not been re-selected as one of the three Labour Party candidates for the ward in the run-up to the May 2018 election, Dunn resigned from the party to stand for re-election as an independent. The Yorkshire Evening Post reported he believed a “predetermined” selection of candidates and disagreements over a local greenbelt development led to him being de-selected.) | Lisa Mulherin (Lab) |
| 2018 | Karen Renshaw (Lab) | Ben Garner (Lab) | Lisa Mulherin (Lab) |
| 2019 | Karen Renshaw (Lab) | Ben Garner (Lab) | Lisa Mulherin (Lab) |
| 2021 | Karen Renshaw (Lab) | Mike Foster (Con) | Lisa Mulherin (Lab) |
| 2022 | Karen Renshaw (Lab) | Mike Foster (Con) | Lisa Mulherin (Lab) |
| 2023 | Karen Renshaw (Lab) | Mike Foster (Con) | Stephen Holroyd-Case (Lab) |
| 2024 | Karen Renshaw (Lab) | Karen Bruce (Lab) | Stephen Holroyd-Case (Lab) (Note: Subsequently changed name to Stephen Holroyd.) |
| 2026 | Robert Jagger* (RUK) | Karen Bruce* (Lab) | Stephen Holroyd* (Lab) |

indicates seat up for re-election. indicates councillor defection. * indicates incumbent councillor.

== Elections since 2010 ==
=== May 2026 ===
2026
| Party | Candidate | Votes | % | ±% |
|---|---|---|---|---|
| Reform | Robert Jagger | 3,023 | 41.6 | New |
| Conservative | Mike Foster | 1,492 | 20.5 | ▼6.4 |
| Labour | Shamim Miah | 1,336 | 18.4 | ▼23.0 |
| Green | Noah Bentley | 802 | 11.0 | ▲6.2 |
| Liberal Democrats | Debra Stretton | 476 | 6.6 | ▼10.2 |
| SDP | Sian Gardener | 135 | 1.9 | 0.0 |
| Majority | | 1,531 | 21.1 | ▲6.6 |
| Turnout | | 7,280 | 40.8 | ▲9.9 |
| Rejected ballots | | 16 | 0.2 | |
| Registered electors | | 17,834 | | |
| Reform gain from Labour | | Swing | ▲32.3 | |

=== May 2024 ===
2024
| Party | Candidate | Votes | % | ±% |
|---|---|---|---|---|
| Labour Co-op | Karen Bruce | 2,240 | 41.4 | −2.1 |
| Conservative | Mike Foster* | 1,455 | 26.9 | +3.3 |
| Liberal Democrats | Tom Leadley | 907 | 16.8 | −8.7 |
| Yorkshire | Claire Buxton | 449 | 8.3 | New |
| Green | Alaric Hall | 261 | 4.8 | ±0.0 |
| SDP | Mark Daniels | 102 | 1.9 | ±0.0 |
| Majority | | 785 | 14.5 | −3.5 |
| Turnout | | 5,446 | 30.9 | +1.3 |
| Labour Co-op gain from Conservative | | Swing | +0.6 | |

=== May 2023 ===
2023
| Party | Candidate | Votes | % | ±% |
|---|---|---|---|---|
| Labour Co-op | Stephen Holroyd-Case | 2,284 | 43.5 | −1.8 |
| Liberal Democrats | Tom Leadley | 1,338 | 25.5 | +19.2 |
| Conservative | Lalit Suryawanshi | 1,237 | 23.6 | −15.9 |
| Green | Leon Zadok | 254 | 4.8 | −1.6 |
| SDP | Daniel Whetstone | 101 | 1.9 | +0.1 |
| Majority | | 946 | 18.0 | +12.3 |
| Turnout | | 5,249 | 29.6 | −2.4 |
| Labour hold | | Swing | | |

=== May 2022 ===
2022
| Party | Candidate | Votes | % | ±% |
|---|---|---|---|---|
| Labour | Karen Renshaw* | 2,572 | 45.3 | +4.0 |
| Conservative | Alan Shires | 2,246 | 39.5 | −7.5 |
| Green | Marcus Cain | 362 | 6.4 | +0.6 |
| Liberal Democrats | Benjamin Ward | 360 | 6.3 | +2.2 |
| SDP | Andrew Martin | 105 | 1.8 | +0.7 |
| Majority | | 326 | 5.7 | 0.0 |
| Turnout | | 5,679 | 32.0 | −4.0 |
| Labour hold | | Swing | | |

=== May 2021 ===
2021
| Party | Candidate | Votes | % | ±% |
|---|---|---|---|---|
| Conservative | Mike Foster | 3,006 | 47.0 | +21.6 |
| Labour Co-op | Ben Garner* | 2,639 | 41.3 | +5.6 |
| Green | Colin Noble | 372 | 5.8 | +0.7 |
| Liberal Democrats | Benjamin Ward | 260 | 4.1 | −0.5 |
| SDP | David Creasser | 71 | 1.1 | +0.5 |
| Majority | | 367 | 5.7 | −4.6 |
| Turnout | | 6,396 | 36.0 | +7.9 |
| Conservative gain from Labour Co-op | | Swing | | |

=== May 2019 ===
2019
| Party | Candidate | Votes | % | ±% |
|---|---|---|---|---|
| Labour Co-op | Lisa Mulherin* | 1,738 | 35.7 | +0.8 |
| Conservative | Mike Foster | 1,238 | 25.4 | −2.5 |
| Independent | Tom Leadley (Note: Leadley was one of the three Morley Borough Independent councillors for Morley North ward and his campaign was supported by the Morley Borough Independents.) | 798 | 16.4 | +16.4 |
| UKIP | Lindon Dove | 596 | 12.2 | +12.2 |
| Green | Rich Daley | 249 | 5.1 | −2.3 |
| Liberal Democrats | Ben Ward | 225 | 4.6 | −0.3 |
| SDP | Daniel Whetstone | 28 | 0.6 | +0.6 |
| Majority | | 500 | 10.3 | +3.3 |
| Turnout | | 4,902 | 28.1 | −2.8 |
| Labour Co-op hold | | Swing | +1.7 | |

=== May 2018 ===
2018
| Party | Candidate | Votes | % | ±% |
|---|---|---|---|---|
| Labour Co-op | Karen Renshaw* | 2,371 | 34.9 | −11.2 |
| Labour Co-op | Ben Garner | 2,074 | | |
| Labour Co-op | Lisa Mulherin* | 2,013 | | |
| Conservative | Mike Foster | 1,897 | 27.9 | +4.1 |
| Independent | Jack Dunn* | 1,694 | 24.9 | N/A |
| Conservative | Kirsty Baldwin | 1,686 | | |
| Conservative | Cameron Stephenson | 1,610 | | |
| Green | Emma Carter | 503 | 7.4 | +4.5 |
| Liberal Democrats | George Hall | 332 | 4.9 | +0.3 |
| Majority | | 474 | 7.0 | −15.3 |
| Turnout | | 17,530 | 30.9 | +2.4 |
| Labour Co-op hold | | Swing | | |
| Labour Co-op hold | | Swing | | |
| Labour Co-op hold | | Swing | | |

=== May 2016 ===
2016
| Party | Candidate | Votes | % | ±% |
|---|---|---|---|---|
| Labour | Karen Renshaw* | 2,248 | 46.1 | +6.6 |
| Conservative | Tim Atkin | 1,161 | 23.8 | −9.1 |
| UKIP | Lindon Dove | 1,096 | 22.5 | +2.0 |
| Liberal Democrats | Benjamin Lloyd Ward | 225 | 4.6 | +1.2 |
| Green | Lyssie Page | 143 | 2.9 | +0.8 |
| Majority | | 1,087 | 22.3 | +15.7 |
| Turnout | | 4,873 | 28.5 | |
| Labour hold | | Swing | | |

=== May 2015 ===
2015
| Party | Candidate | Votes | % | ±% |
|---|---|---|---|---|
| Labour | Jack Dunn* | 4,301 | 39.5 | −9.2 |
| Conservative | Timothy Atkin | 3,582 | 32.9 | +9.4 |
| UKIP | David Daniel | 2,238 | 20.5 | +13.9 |
| Green | Jude Omidiran | 399 | 3.7 | +3.7 |
| Liberal Democrats | Victoria Bishop-Rowe | 373 | 3.4 | −2.8 |
| Majority | | 719 | 6.6 | −18.5 |
| Turnout | | 10,893 | 62.3 | |
| Labour hold | | Swing | −9.3 | |

=== May 2014 ===
2014
| Party | Candidate | Votes | % | ±% |
|---|---|---|---|---|
| Labour | Lisa Mulherin* | 1,865 | 36.0 | |
| UKIP | David Daniel | 1,593 | 30.7 | |
| Conservative | Tim Atkin | 929 | 17.9 | |
| Independent | Wyn Kidger | 482 | 9.3 | |
| Green | Carl James | 176 | 3.4 | |
| Liberal Democrats | Benjamin Ward | 139 | 2.7 | |
| Majority | | 272 | | |
| Turnout | | 5,184 | 30.18 | |
| Labour hold | | Swing | | |

=== May 2012 ===
2012
| Party | Candidate | Votes | % | ±% |
|---|---|---|---|---|
| Labour | Karen Renshaw* | 2,318 | 50.2 | +1.5 |
| Conservative | Sophie Tempest | 884 | 19.2 | −4.4 |
| English Democrat | Joanna Beverley | 787 | 17.1 | +2.0 |
| Morley Borough Independent | Wyn Kidger | 626 | 13.6 | +13.6 |
| Majority | | 1,434 | 31.1 | +6.0 |
| Turnout | | 4,615 | | |
| Labour hold | | Swing | +2.9 | |

=== May 2011 ===
2011
| Party | Candidate | Votes | % | ±% |
|---|---|---|---|---|
| Labour | Jack Dunn* | 2,847 | 48.7 | +7.5 |
| Conservative | Robert Buxton | 1,377 | 23.5 | −1.3 |
| English Democrat | Joanna Beverley | 880 | 15.0 | +15.0 |
| UKIP | Karen Foster | 384 | 6.6 | +2.6 |
| Liberal Democrats | Katherine Bavage | 360 | 6.2 | −10.0 |
| Majority | | 1,470 | 25.1 | +8.7 |
| Turnout | | 5,848 | 34 | |
| Labour hold | | Swing | +4.4 | |

=== May 2010 ===
2010
| Party | Candidate | Votes | % | ±% |
|---|---|---|---|---|
| Labour | Lisa Mulherin* | 4,437 | 41.2 | +11.4 |
| Conservative | Stewart McArdle | 2,671 | 24.8 | +2.0 |
| Liberal Democrats | Katherine Bavage | 1,742 | 16.2 | +9.2 |
| BNP | Joanna Beverley | 1,490 | 13.8 | −15.7 |
| UKIP | David Daniel | 424 | 3.9 | +0.4 |
| Majority | | 1,766 | 16.4 | +16.2 |
| Turnout | | 10,764 | 63.2 | +27.7 |
| Labour hold | | Swing | +4.7 | |

== See also ==
- Listed buildings in Leeds (Ardsley and Robin Hood Ward)
