= Woodkirk Academy =

Academy School in Wakefield, West Yorkshire, England

Location
- Rein Road, Tingley; Wakefield, West Yorkshire, WF3 1JQ; England; 53.72962°N 1.58563°W

Information
- Type: Academy
- Established: 1948
- Local authority: City of Leeds
- Trust: Leodis Academies Trust
- Department for Education URN: 137383 Tables
- Ofsted: Reports
- Head teacher: Tim Jones (Principal)
- Staff: 250+
- Gender: Coeducational
- Age: 11 to 19
- Enrolment: 1,894
- Colours: Royal Blue & Yellow
- Publication: Inspire Magazine
- Website: https://www.woodkirk.leodis.org.uk

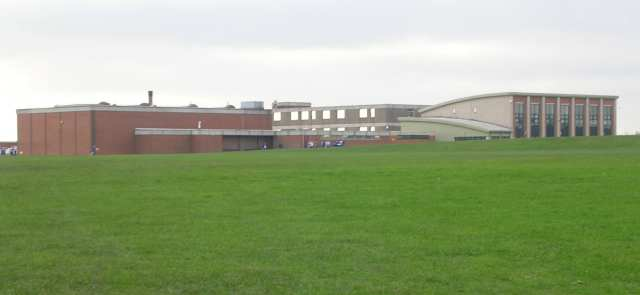
Woodkirk High School viewed from Tingley Common

Woodkirk Academy (formerly Woodkirk High School) is an academy located in Tingley, West Yorkshire, England. Established in 1948, the school now has over 1,800 pupils on roll, over 300 sixth form students and over 250 members of staff. Following Woodkirk gaining ‘Specialist Science Status', the school was briefly renamed Woodkirk High Specialist Science School from 2003 to 2011.

The current principal is Tim Jones, who replaced Jo Barton in 2021. Prior to Barton, Jonathan White held the position for over 10 years. White succeeded previous headteacher Bill Bailey in 2005.

== History ==
Woodkirk opened to students as Woodkirk Secondary School in September 1948.

It consists of the main hall, administration quarters, a number of small classrooms, gymnasium and the central Tower Block which housed the schools main departments: Mathematics, English, Science and Humanities.

By 1972 the school was expanding and saw the addition of the ROSLA Block for the new 5th year students, in line with the raising of school leaving age (the meaning of ROSLA).

In the early 1980s, the school's Yellow Block was completed to house the new English and Science departments on the lower two floors. Laboratories were separated to teach biology, chemistry, physics and astronomy. The upper floors house the relocated Maths and newly formed Modern Foreign Languages (MFL) departments.

In early 2003 the school gained "Specialist Science" status. Following this, the school was renamed Woodkirk High Specialist Science School and the school logo was adapted to include an atom and the Pi (π) symbol.

In September 2011 the school became an academy, joining Leodis Academies Trust and with a name change to Woodkirk Academy.

In the 2010s the new academy saw the replacement of its original tower-chimney. This had long been a landmark for the school but no longer fit with regulations, so was replaced with a more energy and fuel-efficient system.

In the 2010s, part of the former ROSLA block was converted into the Dennis Fisher Sixth Form Centre. The lower floors house the five refurbished design technology classrooms.

In September 2018, Woodkirk celebrated 70 years since its original opening.

== School shows ==
Each year since the early 1960s the school has staged a public production. In 1999, following the March production, the cast of Grease travelled to the London Palladium to represent the North-East as part of an afternoon performance celebrating the 100th anniversary of N.O.D.A. The cast performed a 10-minute excerpt of Myth!, written by a pupil and a school teacher.

Performances have included The Phantom of the Opera (2013), Starlight Express (2014), The Addams Family (2015) and Ghost (2016).

== Notable alumni ==
- Stevie Ward, professional rugby league player for Leeds Rhinos and founder of Mantality magazine.
