= Mark Sewards =

British politician (born 1990)

Mark Sewards MP
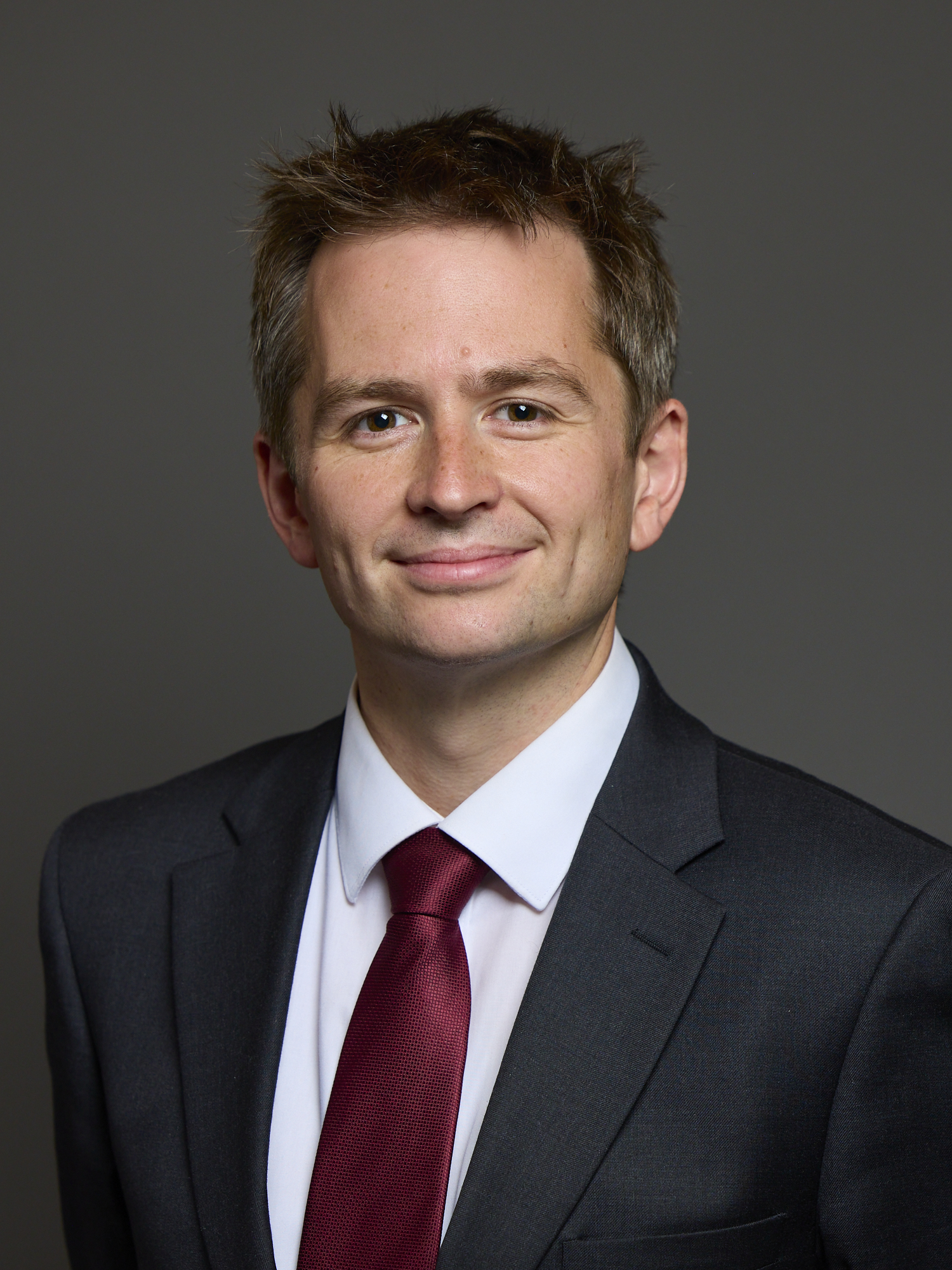
- Official portrait, 2024

Member of Parliament for Leeds South West and Morley
- Incumbent
- Assumed office 4 July 2024
- Preceded by: Constituency established
- Majority: 8,423 (21.0%)

Chair of the Labour Friends of Israel
- Incumbent
- Assumed office November 2025
- Preceded by: Jon Pearce

Leeds City Councillor for Farnley and Wortley
- In office 5 May 2022 – 28 August 2024
- Preceded by: Ann Blackburn
- Succeeded by: David Blackburn

Personal details
- Born: Mark James Sewards; 6 January 1990 (age 36) Leeds, England
- Party: Labour
- Spouse: Alice Smart
- Children: 2
- Education: University of Leeds
- Website: marksewards.co.uk

Mark James Sewards (born 6 January 1990) is a British politician. A member of the Labour Party, he has been the Member of Parliament for Leeds South West and Morley since 2024.

== Early life ==
Sewards studied at Morley High School and studied law at the University of Leeds, where he was also elected as the University Union's Communications and Internal Affairs Officer. He later served as Head of Mathematics at a comprehensive school in Middleton, Leeds for eight years.

== Pre-parliamentary career ==
Before his election as Member of Parliament, Sewards stood as the prospective parliamentary candidate for Harrogate and Knaresborough in 2017 and 2019 general elections, finishing third of four candidates on both occasions, with 20.1% and 9.6% of the vote respectively.

Sewards was elected as a Leeds City Councillor for Farnley and Wortley in 2022 until his resignation on 28 August 2024, following his election to the House of Commons on 4 July.

== Parliamentary career ==
In May 2025, Sewards made a five-day visit to Israel with Labour Friends of Israel (LFI). He was a member of an LFI delegation that met, amongst with others, the Israeli President Isaac Herzog. In November 2025, Sewards became the honorary parliamentary chair of LFI, replacing Jon Pearce, who stepped down on becoming Prime Minister Keir Starmer's Parliamentary private secretary.

In August 2025, Sewards became the first British MP to create an AI version of himself, in order to interact with constituents. The move was met with a mixed reception, with Sewards' claim that it would allow him to be 'more efficient and more present' for his constituency countered by suggestions that the chatbot could create confusion and damage trust in politicians. In December 2025, Sewards shut down the AI chatbot, citing limited functionality.

== Personal life ==
Sewards' wife, Alice Smart, has served as a Labour councillor for Armley on Leeds City Council since 2014. They have two sons.

Parliament of the United Kingdom
New constituency	Member of Parliament for Leeds South West and Morley; 2024–present	Incumbent
