= List of schools in Leeds =

This is a list of schools in the City of Leeds in the English county of West Yorkshire.

== State-funded schools ==
=== Primary schools ===
- Aberford CE Primary School, Aberford
- Adel Primary School, Adel
- Adel St John the Baptist CE Primary School, Adel
- Alder Tree Primary Academy, Potternewton
- All Saints' Richmond Hill CE Primary School, Richmond Hill
- Allerton Bywater Primary School, Allerton Bywater
- Allerton CE Primary School, Moor Allerton
- Alwoodley Primary School, Alwoodley
- Armley Park Primary School, Armley
- Ashfield Primary School, Otley
- Asquith Primary School, Morley
- Austhorpe Primary School, Austhorpe
- Bankside Primary School, Harehills
- Bardsey Primary Academy, Bardsey
- Barwick-in-Elmet CE Primary School, Barwick-in-Elmet
- Beechwood Primary School, Seacroft
- Beecroft Primary School, Burley
- Beeston Hill St Luke's CE Primary School, Beeston
- Beeston Primary School, Beeston
- Birchfield Primary School, Gildersome
- Blackgates Primary School, Tingley
- Blenheim Primary School, Blenheim
- Bracken Edge Primary School, Potternewton
- Bramham Primary School, Bramham
- Bramhope Primary School, Bramhope
- Bramley Park Academy, Bramley
- Bramley St Peter's CE Primary School, Bramley
- Broadgate Primary School, Horsforth
- Brodetsky Primary School, Moortown
- Brudenell Primary School, Hyde Park
- Burley St Matthias CE Primary School, Burley
- Calverley CE Primary School, Calverley
- Calverley Parkside Primary School, Calverley
- Carlton Primary School, Carlton
- Carr Manor Community School, Meanwood
- Castleton Primary School, New Wortley
- Chapel Allerton Primary School, Chapel Allerton
- Christ Church Upper Armley CE Primary School, Armley
- Christ The King RC Primary School, Bramley
- Churwell Primary School, Churwell
- Clapgate Primary School, Middleton
- Cobden Primary School, Farnley
- Cockburn Haigh Road Academy, Rothwell
- Collingham Lady Elizabeth Hastings' CE Primary School, Collingham
- Colton Primary School, Colton
- Cookridge Holy Trinity CE Primary School, Cookridge
- Cookridge Primary School, Cookridge
- Co-op Academy Beckfield, Tyersal
- Co-op Academy Brownhill, Harehills
- Co-op Academy Nightingale, Harehills
- Co-op Academy Oakwood, Gipton
- Co-op Academy Woodlands, Harehills
- Corpus Christi RC Primary School, Halton Moor
- Cottingley Primary Academy, Cottingley
- Cross Gates Primary School, Cross Gates
- Crossley Street Primary School, Wetherby
- Deighton Gates Primary School, Wetherby
- Dixons Trinity Chapeltown, Chapeltown
- Drighlington Primary School, Drighlington
- East Ardsley Primary Academy, East Ardsley
- East Garforth Primary Academy, East Garforth
- Ebor Gardens Primary Academy, Burmantofts
- Elements Primary School, Middleton
- Farsley Farfield Primary School, Farsley
- Farsley Springbank Primary School, Farsley
- Fieldhead Carr Primary School, Whinmoor
- Five Lanes Primary School, Wortley
- Fountain Primary School, Morley
- Gildersome Primary School, Gildersome
- Gledhow Primary School, Gledhow
- Grange Farm Primary School, Seacroft
- Great Preston CE Primary School, Great Preston
- Green Lane Primary Academy, Garforth
- Greenhill Primary School, Bramley
- Greenmount Primary School, Beeston
- Greenside Primary School, Pudsey
- Grimes Dyke Primary School, Stanks
- Guiseley Primary School, Guiseley
- Harehills Primary School, Harehills
- Harewood CE Primary School, Harewood
- Hawksworth CE Primary School, Hawksworth
- Hawksworth Wood Primary School, Hawksworth
- Highfield Primary School, Moortown
- Hill Top Primary Academy, Tingley
- Hillcrest Academy, Chapeltown
- Hollybush Primary, Bramley
- Holy Family RC Primary School, Armley
- Holy Name RC Academy, Cookridge
- Holy Rosary and St Anne's RC Primary School, Chapeltown
- Holy Trinity CE Academy, Rothwell
- Horsforth Featherbank Primary School, Horsforth
- Horsforth Newlaithes Primary School, Horsforth
- Hovingham Primary School, Harehills
- Hugh Gaitskell Primary School, Beeston
- Hunslet Carr Primary School, Hunslet
- Hunslet Moor Primary School, Hunslet
- Hunslet St Mary's Church of England Primary School
- Immaculate Heart of Mary RC Primary School, Chapel Allerton
- Ingram Road Primary School, Holbeck
- Ireland Wood Primary School, Ireland Wood
- Iveson Primary School, Tinshill
- Kerr Mackie Primary School, Roundhay
- Kippax Ash Tree Primary School, Kippax
- Kippax Greenfield Primary School, Kippax
- Kippax North Primary School, Kippax
- Kirkstall St Stephen's Church of England Primary School, Kirkstall
- Kirkstall Valley Primary School, Kirkstall
- Lady Elizabeth Hastings CE Primary School, Ledston
- Lady Elizabeth Hastings CE Primary School, Thorp Arch
- Lane End Primary School, Holbeck
- Lawns Park Primary School, Old Farnley
- Little London Community Primary School, Little London
- Low Road Primary School, Hunslet
- Lower Wortley Primary School, Wortley
- Lowtown Primary School, Pudsey
- Manor Wood Primary School, Moortown
- Manston Primary School, Manston
- Manston St James Primary Academy, Manston
- Meadowfield Primary School, Osmondthorpe
- Meanwood CE Primary School, Meanwood
- Methley Primary School, Methley
- Micklefield CE Primary School, Micklefield
- Middleton Primary School, Middleton
- Middleton St Mary's CE Primary School, Middleton
- Moor Allerton Hall Primary School, Moor Allerton
- Moortown Primary School, Moortown
- Morley Newlands Primary Academy, Morley
- Morley Victoria Primary School, Morley
- The New Bewerley Community School, Hunslet
- Ninelands Primary School, Garforth
- Otley All Saints CofE Primary School, Otley
- Otley The Whartons Primary School, Otley
- Oulton Primary School, Oulton
- Our Lady of Good Counsel RC Primary School, Seacroft
- Park Spring Primary School, Hough End
- Park View Primary Academy, Beeston
- Parklands Primary School, Seacroft
- Pool-in-Wharfedale CE Primary School, Pool-in-Wharfedale
- Primley Wood Primary School, Chapeltown
- Primrose Lane Primary School, Boston Spa
- Pudsey Bolton Royd Primary School, Pudsey
- Pudsey Primrose Hill Primary School, Pudsey
- Pudsey Waterloo Primary, Pudsey
- Quarry Mount Primary School, Woodhouse
- Queensway Primary School, Yeadon
- Rawdon Littlemoor Primary School, Rawdon
- Rawdon St Peter's CE Primary School, Rawdon
- Raynville Academy, Bramley
- The Richmond Hill Academy, Richmond Hill
- Robin Hood Primary School, Robin Hood
- Rosebank Primary School, Burley
- Rothwell Primary School, Rothwell
- Rothwell St Mary's RC Primary School, Rothwell
- Roundhay School, Roundhay
- Roundhay St John's CE Primary School, Roundhay
- Rufford Park Primary School, Yeadon
- Ryecroft Academy, Farnley
- Sacred Heart RC Primary School, Burley
- St Anthony's RC Primary School, Beeston
- St Augustine's RC Primary School, Gipton
- St Bartholomew's CE Primary School, Armley
- St Benedict's RC Primary School, Garforth
- St Chad's CE Primary School, Lawnswood
- St Edward's RC Primary School, Boston Spa
- St Francis RC Primary School, Morley
- St Francis of Assisi RC Primary School, Beeston
- St James' CE Primary School, Wetherby
- St Joseph's Catholic Primary School, Hunslet
- St Joseph's Catholic Primary School, Otley
- St Joseph's Catholic Primary School, Pudsey
- St Joseph's Catholic Primary School, Wetherby
- St Margaret's CE Primary School, Horsforth
- St Marys CE Primary Academy, Hunslet
- St Mary's CE Primary School, Boston Spa
- St Mary's RC Primary School, Horsforth
- St Matthew's CE Primary School, Chapel Allerton
- St Nicholas RC Primary School, Gipton
- St Oswald's CE Junior School, Guiseley
- St Patrick's RC Primary School, Burmantofts
- St Paul's RC Primary School, Whinmoor
- St Peter's CE Primary School, Lincoln Green
- St Philip's RC Primary School, Middleton
- St Theresa's RC Primary School, Manston
- St Urban's RC Primary School, Chapel Allerton
- SS Peter and Paul RC Primary School, Yeadon
- Scholes Primary School, Scholes
- Seacroft Grange Primary School, Seacroft
- Seven Hills Primary School, Morley
- Shadwell Primary School, Shadwell
- Shakespeare Primary School, Burmantofts
- Sharp Lane Primary School, Middleton
- Shire Oak CE Primary School, Headingley
- Southroyd Primary School, Pudsey
- Spring Bank Primary School, Headingley
- Stanningley Primary School, Stanningley
- Strawberry Fields Primary School, Garforth
- Summerfield Primary School, Bramley
- Swarcliffe Primary School, Swarcliffe
- Swillington Primary School, Swillington
- Swinnow Primary School, Swinnow
- Talbot Primary School, Roundhay
- Temple Learning Academy, Halton Moor
- Templenewsam Halton Primary School, Halton
- Thorner CE Primary School, Thorner
- Thorpe Primary School, Thorpe on the Hill
- Tranmere Park Primary School, Guiseley
- Valley View Community Primary School, Rodley
- Victoria Junior School, Rothwell
- Victoria Primary Academy, East End Park
- Weetwood Primary School, Weetwood
- West End Primary School, Horsforth
- Westbrook Lane Primary School, Horsforth
- Westerton Primary Academy, Tingley
- Westgate Primary School, Otley
- Westroyd Primary School, Farsley
- Westwood Primary School, Middleton
- Whingate Primary School, Wortley
- Whinmoor St Paul's CE Primary School, Whinmoor
- White Laith Primary School, Whinmoor
- Whitecote Primary School, Bramley
- Whitkirk Primary School, Whitkirk
- Wigton Moor Primary School, Alwoodley
- Windmill Primary School, Belle Isle
- Woodlesford Primary School, Woodlesford
- Wykebeck Primary School, Harehills
- Yeadon Westfield Infant School, Yeadon
- Yeadon Westfield Junior School, Yeadon

=== Secondary schools ===
- Abbey Grange Church of England Academy, West Park
- Allerton Grange School, Moortown
- Allerton High School, Moor Allerton
- Benton Park School, Rawdon
- Bishop Young Church of England Academy, Seacroft
- Boston Spa Academy, Boston Spa
- Brigshaw High School, Allerton Bywater
- Bruntcliffe Academy, Morley
- Cardinal Heenan Catholic High School, Meanwood
- Carr Manor Community School, Meanwood
- Cockburn John Charles Academy, Belle Isle
- Cockburn Laurence Calvert Academy, Middleton
- Cockburn School, Beeston
- Co-op Academy Leeds, Burmantofts
- Co-op Academy Priesthorpe, Farsley
- Corpus Christi Catholic College, Halton Moor
- Crawshaw Academy, Pudsey
- Dixons Trinity Chapeltown, Chapeltown
- Dixons Unity Academy, Armley
- The Farnley Academy, Farnley
- Garforth Academy, Garforth
- Guiseley School, Guiseley
- Horsforth School, Horsforth
- John Smeaton Academy, Cross Gates
- Lawnswood School, West Park
- Leeds City Academy, Woodhouse
- Leeds East Academy, Seacroft
- Leeds Jewish Free School, Alwoodley
- Leeds West Academy, Rodley
- The Morley Academy, Morley
- Mount St Mary's Catholic High School, Richmond Hill
- Oulton Academy, Oulton
- Prince Henry's Grammar School, Otley
- Pudsey Grammar School, Pudsey
- Ralph Thoresby School, Holt Park
- The Rodillian Academy, Lofthouse
- Roundhay School, Roundhay
- The Ruth Gorse Academy, Morley
- St Mary's Menston Catholic Voluntary Academy, Menston
- Temple Learning Academy, Halton Moor
- Temple Moor High School, Halton
- Trinity Academy Leeds, Burmantofts
- University Technical College Leeds, Hunslet
- Wetherby High School, Wetherby
- Woodkirk Academy, Tingley

=== Special and alternative schools ===
- Broomfield South SILC, Belle Isle
- Co-op Academy Brierley, Harehills
- The Elland Academy, Garforth
- Green Meadows Academy, Guiseley
- John Jamieson School, Oakwood
- Lighthouse School Leeds, Cookridge
- Penny Field School, Meanwood
- Springwell Leeds Academy, Belle Isle
- The Stephen Longfellow Academy, Beeston
- West Oaks School, Boston Spa
- West SILC, Stanningley

=== Further education ===
- Elliott Hudson College
- Leeds City College
- Leeds College of Building
- Leeds Mathematics School
- Notre Dame Catholic Sixth Form College

== Independent schools ==
=== Primary and preparatory schools ===
- The Froebelian School, Horsforth
- Leeds Menorah School, Moortown
- Moorlands School, Weetwood
- Queenswood School, Morley
- Richmond House School, Far Headingley

=== Senior and all-through schools ===
- Al Kauthar Girls Academy, Chapel Allerton
- Fulneck School, Fulneck
- Gateways School, Harewood
- Grammar School at Leeds, Alwoodley Gates
- Woodhouse Grove School, Apperley Bridge

=== Special and alternative schools ===
- Armley Grange School, Armley
- Core Training and Development, Farnley
- Fountain House Education Suite, Beeston
- LS-TEN, Hunslet
- The Pivot Academy LS East, Killingbeck
- St John's Catholic School for the Deaf, Boston Spa
- Southway, Belle Isle

=== Further education ===
- SLP College
