= John Townsley =

British educator

Sir John Arthur Townsley is a British educator.

He began teaching in Leeds c. 1987 at John Smeaton High School. He spent ten years at The King's School in Pontefract, before becoming Deputy Headteacher at Prince Henry's Grammar School in Otley. He became headteacher at Morley High School in 2003. The school had been rated Satisfactory by Ofsted before his appointment, but after a 2009 inspection it was upgraded to Outstanding; it then became an Academy in 2011 under Townsley's leadership. The school then became an Academy sponsor and linked with Farnley Academy in Leeds and several primary schools to form part of The Gorse Academy Trust; Townsley had taken over leadership at Farnley in 2009, and saw it increase from an Inadequate Ofsted ranking in 2009 to Outstanding in 2013, and later being reduced back down to Requires Improvement after an impromptu Ofsted inspection following accusations of off-rolling. He also became Executive Headteacher of The Ruth Gorse Academy free school in Leeds. Townsley was knighted in the 2015 New Year Honours "for service to education".

Concerns have been raised by education unions and staff regarding his professional management style and culture established, describing it as bullying.
