= Gildersome =

Village and civil parish in West Yorkshire, England

Coordinates: 53.759°N 1.632°W

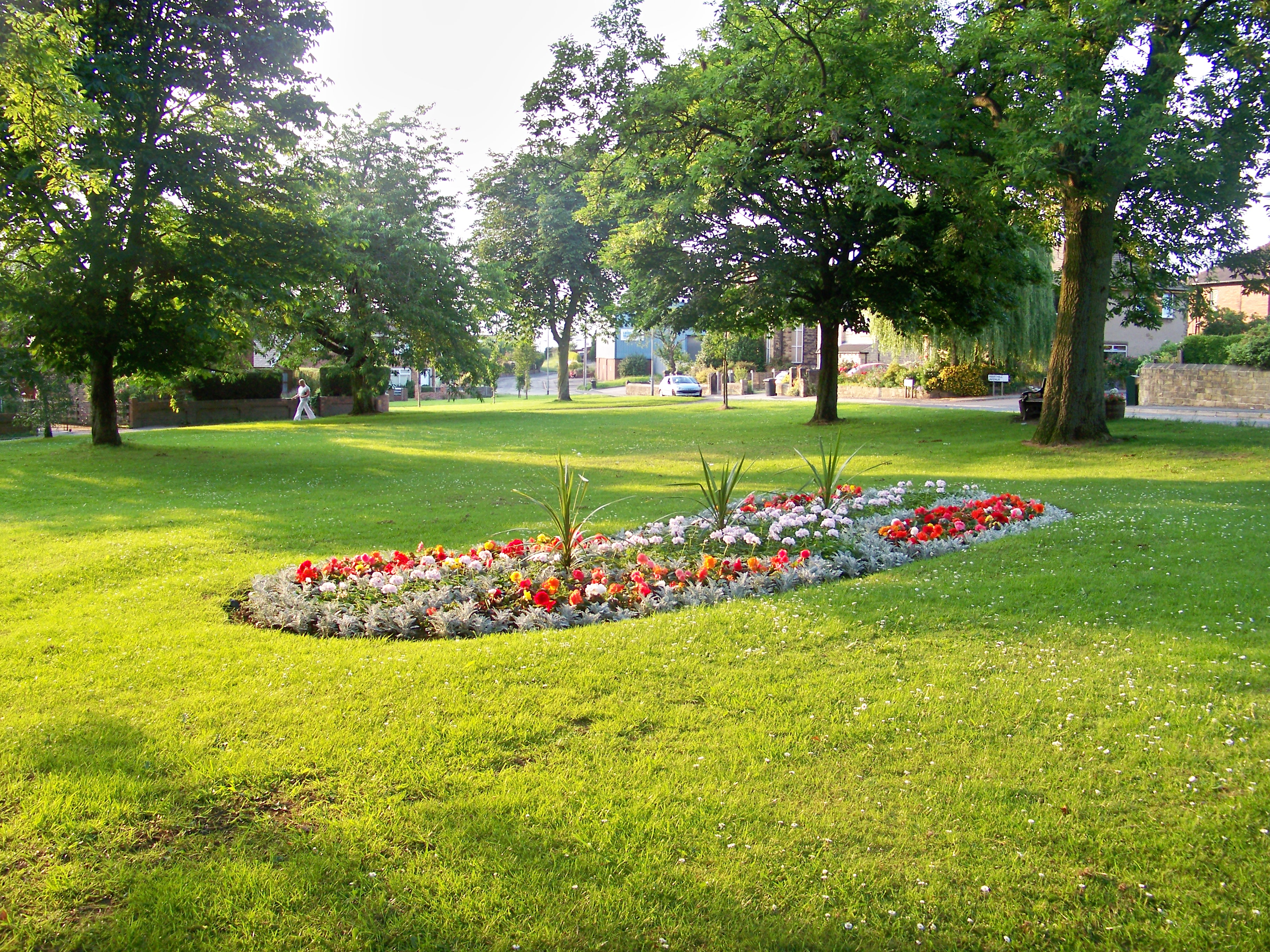
- Gildersome village green

- Location within West Yorkshire
- Population: 5,804 (2011)
- OS grid reference: SE243292
- Civil parish: Gildersome
- Metropolitan borough: City of Leeds
- Metropolitan county: West Yorkshire
- Region: Yorkshire and the Humber
- Country: England
- Sovereign state: United Kingdom
- Post town: LEEDS
- Postcode district: LS27
- Dialling code: 0113
- Police: West Yorkshire
- Fire: West Yorkshire
- Ambulance: Yorkshire
- UK Parliament: Morley and Outwood

Gildersome is a village and civil parish in the City of Leeds metropolitan borough 5 miles (7 km) south-west of Leeds city centre in West Yorkshire, England. Glidersome forms part of the Heavy Woollen District.

== Location ==
Historically part of the West Riding of Yorkshire, it is situated midway between Leeds, Wakefield and Bradford but is in the LS27 (Leeds) postcode area while the village telephone numbers are "0113", the Leeds prefix.

Gildersome was an urban district, established in 1894. In 1937 it was absorbed into the Municipal Borough of Morley. In 1974 the borough was abolished and combined with neighbouring authorities in the City of Leeds. Although the village is still classed as part of the Morley urban area in the census, it is technically separate, and is not governed by Morley Town Council. In 2004 a civil parish was established and the village now has a parish council. At the 2011 Census the population of this civil parish was 5,804. Gildersome is sits in the Morley North ward, which elects three councillors to Leeds City Council, and the Morley and Outwood parliamentary constituency.

Gildersome is one of the highest parts of the Leeds district area at 561 feet above sea level (Hart Hill).

The M621 motorway begins at M62 motorway junction 27 which is Gildersome. The A62 Leeds to Huddersfield (Gelderd Road) also runs by the village.

== Amenities ==
Gildersome has many services such as a library, doctor's, fast food restaurants, laundrette and a small Co-op store. A playground sits next to the library. A war memorial is situated on the village green. Perhaps slightly unusual for a village of its size, it has always had a number of schools, right through its history. At present, there are two primary schools; Gildersome Primary and Birchfield Primary. The schools are both feeder schools to a range of high schools in the area, as the village is allocated centrally between the likes of The Farnley Academy and the Morley schools, Bruntcliffe Academy and The Morley Academy.

Gildersome Primary School's emblem which is placed on the uniforms and school-related products, is a phoenix. The school was initially built in 1984, to educate the pupils of the merging Gildersome Junior School and St Peter's Infant School, allowing children to be taught from reception age, through to 11. However the philosophy behind the phoenix comes from the fact that both schools suffered terrible fires, in the '70s and '80s. The new school was seen as a new beginning, and the phoenix was chosen as an emblem, which remains to this date. A revised edition was designed in 2003, for multimedia purposes.

Gildersome has a largely sporting community, especially within football and cricket sectors. The village team, Gildersome Spurs, trains and plays teams in football from an early age, and holds an annual gala. The cricket club, located at the top of Street Lane, has been successfully operating for decades. In 2007, they broke records, when their junior team played four matches, one in each country in the space of 12 hours, a feat which was recorded by local and national media. In September 2007 Gildersome entered rugby league with a team playing in the CMS Yorkshire league Division 4.

== Etymology ==
The name of Gildersome is first attested in 1181, as Gildehusum. The research of the English Place-Name Society established that the name derives from the Old Norse words gildi ('banquet, tax, guild') and húsum ('houses', the dative plural form of hús, 'house). Thus the name once meant 'guild-houses'.

This etymology supersedes older guesses, including the 1913 opinion of Armitage Goodall that the first element was the archaic northern English dialect word gill ('stream, ravine, narrow valley'), and the earlier idea that Gildersome derived from a Dutch place name such as *Guelderzoom referring to immigrants from Guelderland.

== History ==
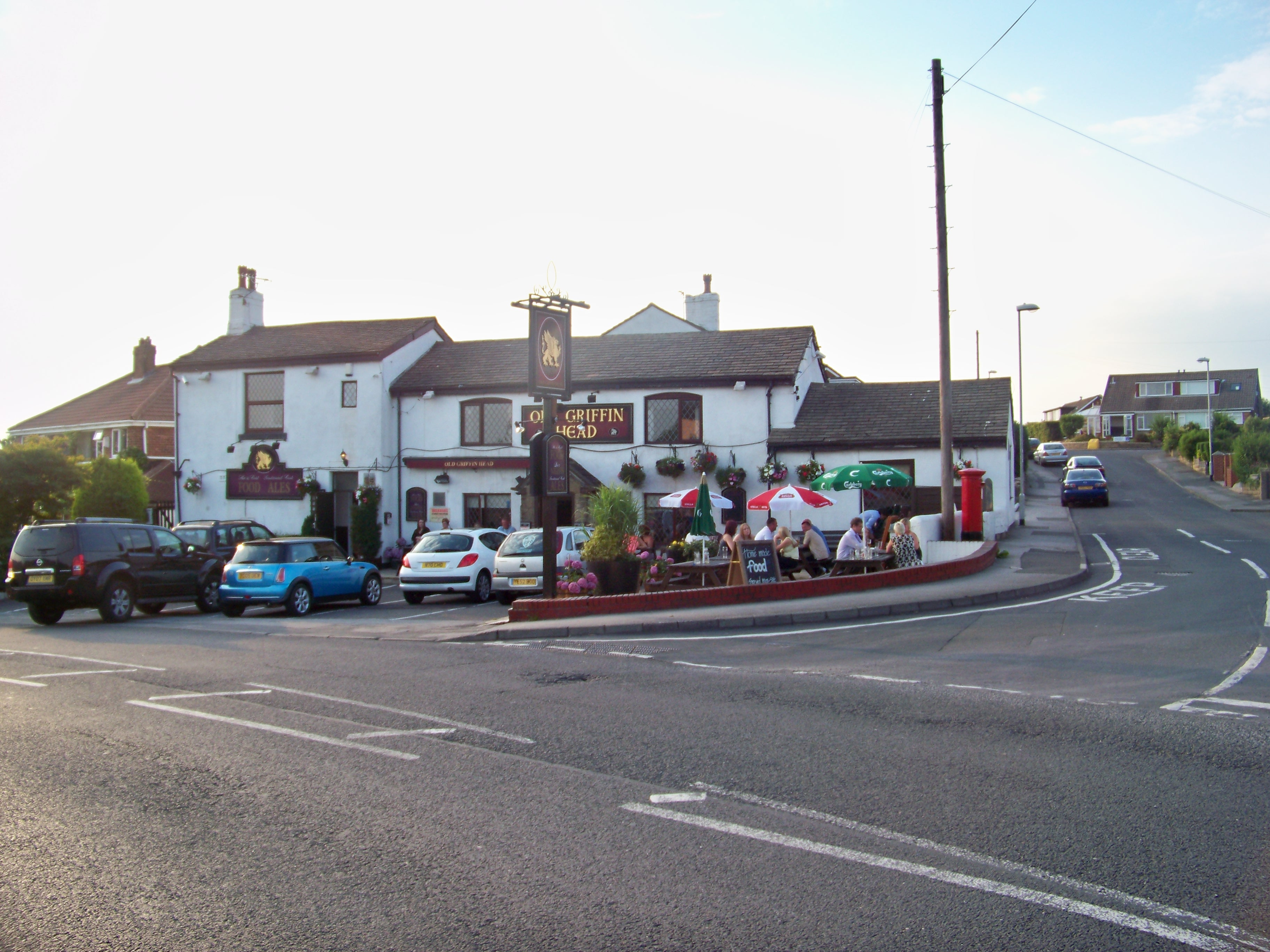
Old Griffin Head

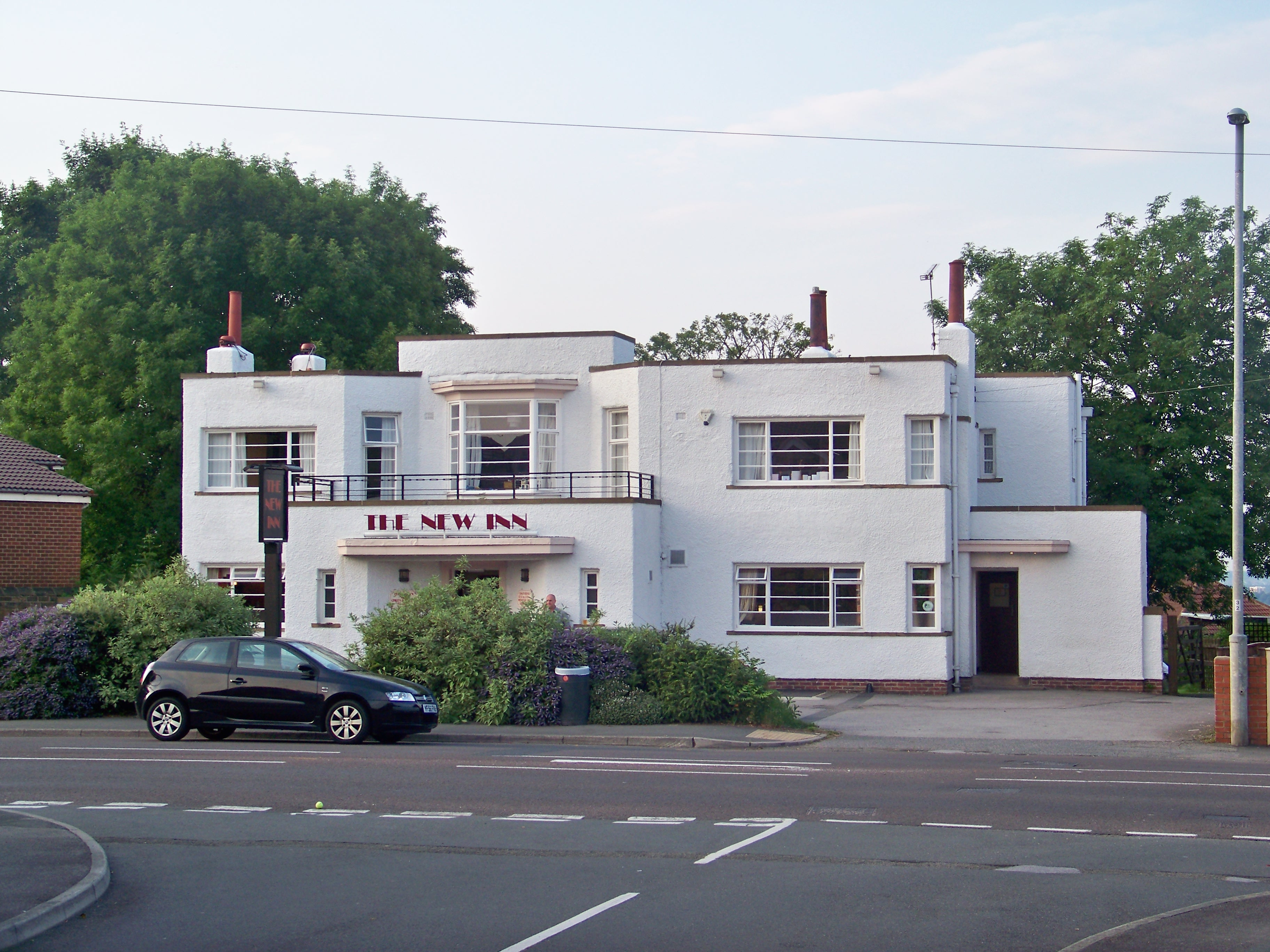
New Inn

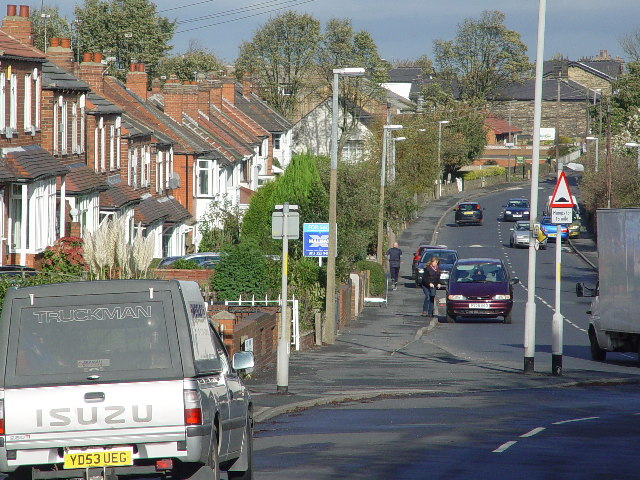
Housing in Gildersome

The first church in the village, Gildersome Baptist Church was constructed in 1707. It was built for public worship with an intended capacity of 250 people. In 2007 there were many celebrations and events to coincide with the 300th anniversary of the original place of worship. In 1866, for a cost of approximately £2,000, a new chapel was built, much larger than the original. It was opened on 2 May 1866, and the original building remains. However, in recent years, the church was redeveloped, with the adjoining halls and facilities being converted into flats. The original hall was renovated, with a new and modern interior and brand new facilities. Through grants, volunteering schemes and assistance from various sources, the graveyard has also been converted into a community garden, which encourages local school children to learn more about the environment and nature.

Turton Hall in Gildersome (now three residential dwellings) was a prominent and wealthy school, for higher education pupils, during the 1700s. It is said that preacher John Wesley visited and preached in the dining room. The hall returned to private ownership in 1879, and remains a Grade II listed building, with several TPOs (tree preservation orders) covering the grounds.

Gildersome gained national widespread attention in 1663, when a foiled plot aimed at taking over the city of Leeds, and other strongholds in the Yorkshire area came to the attention of the public. It is now commonly known as the Farnley Wood Plot, but many of the conspirators came from the Gildersome area. In conjunction with this plot, many people were arrested and held captive at York. Three who managed to escape were brought back to Leeds for immediate execution. Some people go as far to say, that the land on which one of the plotter's house used to stand, along with the original plantains, is now haunted.

During the war years, on the land on which the Green Park sits, at the bottom of the Gildersome Primary drive, there was a public air-raid shelter. Winston Churchill once made a visit to the village, stopping on the boundary between Leeds (city centre) and Morley, where he "meeted and greeted" people near St Bernard's (now on Gelderd Road)

Gildersome also used to have two fully functioning railway stations. One was on the Great Northern Railway line from Wakefield to Bradford which ran at the turn of the 20th century, and it was located at the crossroads at the top of the village (towards Morley). This station closed in 1962 along with Drighlington and Adwalton railway station In the recent roundabout replacements a tunnel on the GNR line was uncovered and then resealed. The second railway station was on Rooms Lane and was on the Leeds to Huddersfield LNWR "Leeds New Line" opened in 1900. This station closed in 1923 to passengers.

Gildersome has changed beyond recognition in 100 years, when the village was a thriving mining community with many local pits. A lot of the original mining locations remain, such as the 'brownhills', a large area of land which separates Gildersome from neighbouring Drighlington. The provisions created for the miners, including the increased number of housing remain today, including the town houses and terraces built on Street Lane. A lot of the land has subsequently been redeveloped. The land on which Mill Lane and its subsequent housing now sits was, as the name suggests, a large industrial area, with Maiden Mills built on the site. Originally, there was a flax mill, but during an incident in 1914, the mill burnt down, and a new one was built.

On 4 February 1974, the village and surrounding area gathered widespread national attention, as result of the M62 coach bombing: 12 people including soldiers and members of their families, died in the incident, which the media claimed to be the work of the IRA.

In the 1990s, much former industrial land in Gildersome was cleared and re-developed for housing.

== Notable people ==
- Mary Irvine Thompson (1919–2001), first female chartered engineer to be admitted to the Institution of Structural Engineers (1947), started her school education in Gildersome.

== See also ==
- Listed buildings in Gildersome
- M62 coach bombing
- Gildersome Baptist Church
