= Elliott Hudson College =

Location
- White Rose Office Park; Millshaw Road; Beeston; Leeds, West Yorkshire, LS11 0LT; England; 53.761364°N 1.576706°W

Information
- Type: Free school sixth form
- Established: 1 September 2015
- Local authority: Leeds
- Department for Education URN: 141940 Tables
- Ofsted: Reports
- Chair of Governors: Terry Elliott
- Principal: Lee Styles
- Gender: Mixed
- Age: 16 to 19
- Capacity: 1400
- Houses: Luther King, Earhart, Yousafzai, Hawking, Attenborough, Parks
- Website: http://www.elliotthudsoncollege.ac.uk/

Elliott Hudson College is a sixth form located in the Beeston area of Leeds, West Yorkshire, England. The college offers A-Level and vocational courses for up to 1400 students from the Leeds City Region.

Elliott Hudson College is part of The GORSE Academies Trust which also includes Boston Spa Academy, Bruntcliffe Academy, The Farnley Academy, The Morley Academy and The Ruth Gorse Academy.

== History ==
The college is named after two former students of Morley High School, Hannah Hudson and Natasha Elliott. Hannah was killed in a road traffic accident in 2009 and Natasha in a railway accident in 2010.

Established in 2015, Elliott Hudson College is located in the White Rose Office Park. Upon opening, the sixth forms of The Morley Academy and The Farnley Academy were closed. The aim of the college has been to provide high quality academic A-level education to students of the Leeds and West Yorkshire area. The names of the alliances (houses) were chosen by the college's first cohort, after inspirational figures. The college was first located in a building in the nearby Millshaw Business Park that now hosts The Stephen Longfellow Academy, an alternative provisions free school that is part of The GORSE Academies Trust. Later the college was located in another building in White Rose Office Park while the current building was being built. In September 2017, the college moved to the current permanent site. The construction was estimated to cost £11.1 million.

When first inspected by Ofsted in March 2018, the college was rated Outstanding overall and in all areas of its work. The college was noted for the progress made by students, in particular students from disadvantaged backgrounds.

== Extra-curricular activities ==
On Wednesdays, students take part in enrichment where they can be involved in a wide range of clubs and activities. There are five different enrichment pathways that students can take part in: Stand Out, Keep Learning, Get Involved, Be Active, Explore. Students may also decide to join the Students' Union for enrichment through which they can represent the students and work with senior members of the college staff to develop and improve the student experience. Every year, elections are held for Student Union President and Vice President. The college hosts various events throughout the academic year for students such as trips, talks from guest speakers. Every year there is a Destinations Day where Year 12 students attend talks and events related to careers, university study and options for life after college. On this day there is a careers fair, where many universities, apprenticeship providers, businesses and organisations are invited.

=== The Gorse Boat Club ===
Elliott Hudson College is unique, as it is one of the only state schools in the UK to have a rowing club. The Gorse Boat Club consists of students from Elliott Hudson College, Elliott Hudson College at Boston Spa and the secondary schools of The GORSE Academies Trust. The programme initially started in September 2016 with students from The Ruth Gorse Academy and Elliott Hudson College. Ben Cox, director of RowUK, helped in the creation of The Gorse Boat Club after approaching Sir John Townsley, CEO of The GORSE Academies Trust. Members of the club at Elliott Hudson College engage in strength and conditioning sessions at the college gym and on-water training at The Stourton Boathouse (which is shared with Leeds Rowing Club and the University of Leeds Boat Club) alongside their studies. Several members of the rowing club have been selected for the British Rowing World Class Start Programme, a specialist talent identification programme that trains and develops athletes for the GB Rowing Team. The Gorse Boat Club is affiliated with British Rowing and thus members compete in official regattas and head races throughout the UK.

== Notable former pupils ==
- Anthony Harding, diver
- Lois Toulson, diver
