= University Technical College Leeds =

Coordinates: 53.7881°N 1.5340°W

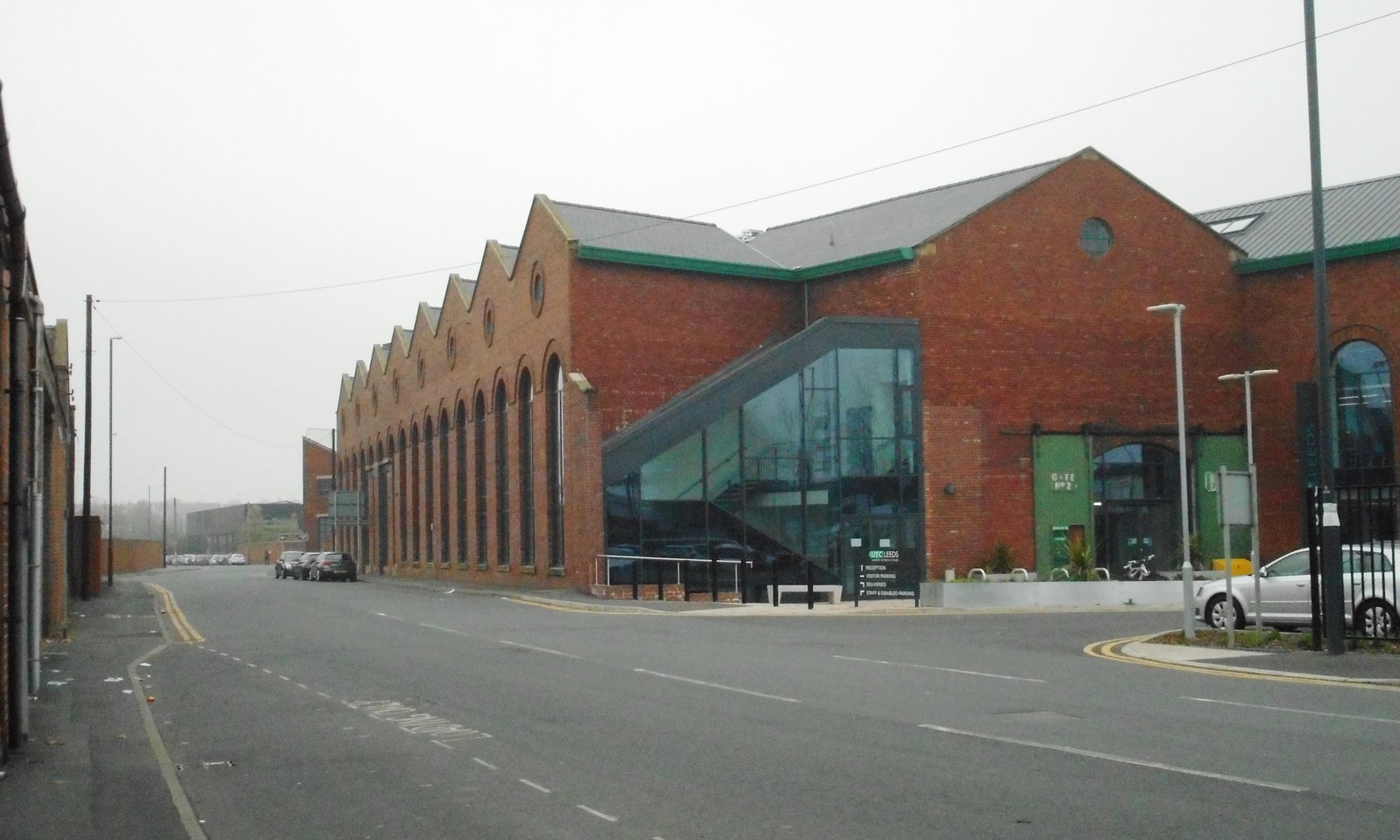
- UTC Leeds building on Sayner Road

Location
- 2-10 Sayner Road; Leeds, West Yorkshire, LS10 1LA; England

Information
- Type: University technical college
- School district: Hunslet
- Local authority: 383 Leeds
- Department for Education URN: 142604 Tables
- Ofsted: Reports
- Gender: Mixed
- Age: 14 to 19
- Website: www.utcleeds.co.uk

University Technical College Leeds is a university technical college (UTC) in Hunslet, Leeds, England, which opened in September 2016. The UTC is sponsored by the University of Leeds and several local employers.

The college forms part of an educational hub in the north of Hunslet, with Leeds City College's Printworks Campus using the former Alf Cooke printworks building, Leeds College of Building's Cudbear Street site, and the Ruth Gorse Academy all in close proximity to each other.

Since September 2023, UTC Leeds has been a part of the Rodillian Academy Trust.

The college is based in a formerly disused part of Braime Pressings' factory on Hunslet Road.
