= Co-op Academy Leeds =

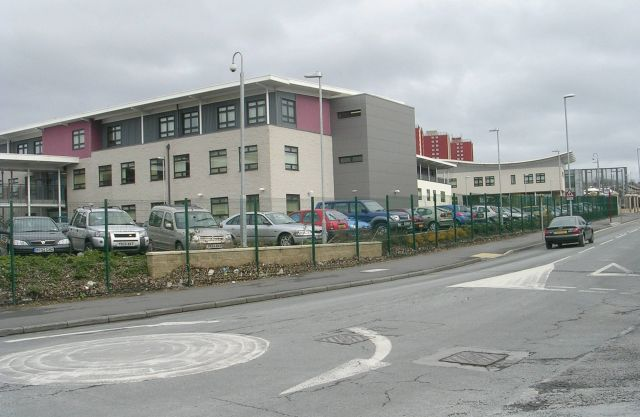

Location
- Stoney Rock Lane; Leeds, West Yorkshire, LS9 7HD; England
- Coordinates: 53.80288°N 1.52095°W

Information
- Type: Co-operative academy
- Local authority: Leeds City Council
- Department for Education URN: 137065 Tables
- Ofsted: Reports
- Principal: Natalie Jones
- Gender: Coeducational
- Age: 11 to 18
- Website: http://www.leeds.coopacademies.co.uk

Co-op Academy Leeds (formerly Primrose High School) is a co-operative academy in Leeds, West Yorkshire, England. It is a part of the Co-op Academies Trust, which is sponsored by The Co-operative Group.

== Site ==
The school is in the eastern corner of Leeds city centre. The original site for the school was on Hill Street and Dolly Lane. The school had a main site and a separate annexe, which had a maths department, science department and a sixth form department. In September 2006 the school moved to a new purpose-built site, which is part of a PFI scheme.

Education Leeds held consultations in regards to closing Primrose High School and replacing it with The Co-operative Academy of Leeds on the same site, which would be sponsored by The Co-operative Group. Primrose High School closed in August 2011 and re-opened as The Co-operative academy of Leeds in September 2011.This school is near Shakespeare Primary School and Harehills Primary School. In September 2018 it was renamed Co-op Academy Leeds in line with Co-op Academies Trust new branding and naming strategy.

== Ofsted inspection ==
As of April 2024 the school is graded "Good" in all areas by Ofsted.
