= Gildersome Baptist Church =

Church in West Yorkshire, England

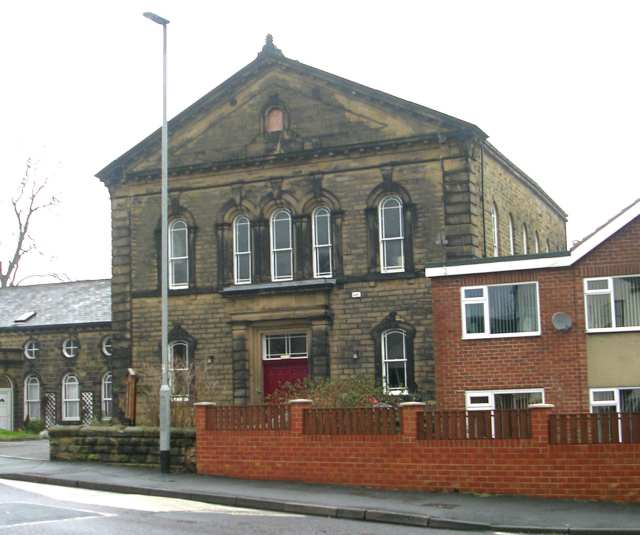
Gildersome Baptist Church

Gildersome Baptist Church, Gildersome, West Yorkshire, England, is one of the oldest churches within the Gildersome/Morley area, having in 2007 celebrated 300 years of preaching. Reverend David Newton is the current preacher.

== History ==
The original chapel was opened in 1707, and the building was used by residents, but it became apparent that a more functional building should be used. In 1866, for a cost of approximately £2,000, a new chapel was built, much larger than the original. It was opened on 2 May 1866, and the original building remains to this date.

== Recent development ==
Extensive plans were made for a new building to be constructed and for the land to be developed efficiently. The final plan was put in place, allowing the Church to keep the 1866 building, but refurbish inside to a high-spec. They closed the balcony and upper floor auditorium, placing a false roof in, and altering the ground floor into modern facilities. The adjoining halls, which used to house the facilities hall, stage, dressing rooms, kitchen and Sunday School rooms were converted into private flats, and a new building, a block of flats, was built to the rear. The graveyard has been part of regeneration schemes, and through extensive grants and volunteer help, the place has been converted, and is now used as an open-classroom, facilitating for the local schools.

During this time of development, the church was closed and it was relocated to the Youth Centre, before the grand opening a couple of years ago.

In joint schemes through church members, the wide community and businesses, several events and schemes operate through the year. The former Joseph Priestley College (Now Leeds City College) have since the Church opened, encouraged college learning, providing many courses, especially IT. Also, some youngsters have been encouraged to take part in the redevelopment in the garden, learning from experts on construction and gardening.
