= Listed buildings in Gildersome =

Gildersome is a civil parish in the metropolitan borough of the City of Leeds, West Yorkshire, England. The parish contains eight listed buildings that are recorded in the National Heritage List for England. All the listed buildings are designated at Grade II, the lowest of the three grades, which is applied to "buildings of national importance and special interest". The parish contains the village of Gildersome and the surrounding area, and the listed buildings consist of houses, a church and Sunday school, a Friend's meeting house, and a milestone.

== Buildings ==
| Name and location | Photograph | Date | Notes |
|---|---|---|---|
| Friends' Meeting House; 53.75746°N 1.63228°W | | 1756–58 | The meeting house is in stone, with shaped gutter brackets, and a stone slate roof. There is a single storey and four bays. On the front are two doorways with tie-stone jambs, and the windows are sashes with lintels and projecting sills. Attached to the front are two 17th-century gravestones. The meeting house is approached through a 19th-century archway. |
| Rose Cottage; 53.75852°N 1.63045°W | — | 1760 | The house, which was later extended to the rear, is in rendered stone, with rusticated quoins, and a tile roof with coped gables and shaped kneelers. There are two storeys, a symmetrical front of three bays, and an added rear bay. The central doorway has interrupted jambs, a chamfered surround, and a moulded cornice, above which is a date plate and an oculus. The windows are mullioned with two lights and sashes. |
| 145 and 147 Wakefield Road; 53.74973°N 1.63294°W | — | Mid to late 18th century | A pair of stone cottages with quoins and a stone slate roof. There are two storeys and three bays. In the centre is an altered canted bay window flanked by doorways with tie-stone jambs. The other windows are mullioned with three lights. |
| Maggot Row; 53.75741°N 1.62174°W | — | Mid to late 18th century | The house is in rendered stone, with a stone slate roof, two storeys, and a symmetrical front of three bays. The doorway is in the centre, and the windows are mullioned with three lights. |
| Turton Hall; 53.75725°N 1.62608°W | | Mid to late 18th century | A stone house on a plinth, with rusticated quoins, bands, and a hipped roof of Welsh blue slate. There are three storeys, a basement at the rear, and a symmetrical front of five bays. The central doorway has an architrave, a pulvinated frieze, and a moulded cornice. The windows in the floors above the doorway each has an architrave, a pulvinated frieze, and a cornice, and the other windows have simpler surrounds. At the rear is a doorway approached by three steps. |
| Grove House; 53.75852°N 1.62813°W | — | Late 18th to early 19th century | A house later divided into two, it is in stone on a plinth, with corner pilasters, and a tile roof with coped gables. There are two storeys and five bays. In the centre is a doorway with an architrave, a frieze, and a cornice, and to the left is an inserted doorway with monolithic jambs. The window above the doorway has an architrave and a moulded sill, and the other windows have plain surrounds. At the rear are quoins and a retained three-light mullioned window. |
| Milestone; 53.76041°N 1.61351°W | | Early to mid 19th century | The milestone is on the southeast side of Gelderd Road (A62 road). It is in stone with cast iron overlay, and has a triangular section and a rounded top. On the top is "LEEDS & BIRSTAL ROAD" and "GILDERSOME", and on the sides are the distances to Huddersfield, Leeds, and Birstall. |
| Baptist church and Sunday school 53.76070°N 1.63568°W | | 1865 | The Sunday school was added to the church in about 1887. The buildings are in stone with roofs of Welsh blue slate. The church has two storeys, and a symmetrical front on a plinth, with three bays under a pedimented gable containing a round-arched window with a keystone and date in the tympanum. On the corners are channelled quoin pilasters, and a cornice on paired consoles. In the centre is a portal with channelled pilasters, an entablature and a cornice, and a doorway with a fanlight. This is flanked by segmental-arched windows with shouldered jambs and crested lintels. In the upper floor are windows, triple in the centre, with semicircular-arched lintels, imposts, and keystones. The Sunday school to the left has one storey, seven bays, and a central porch. The windows are round-arched and above them are oculi with keystones. |
