= Hallfield =

Area of Wetherby, West Yorkshire, England

Coordinates: 53.9287°N 1.3781°W

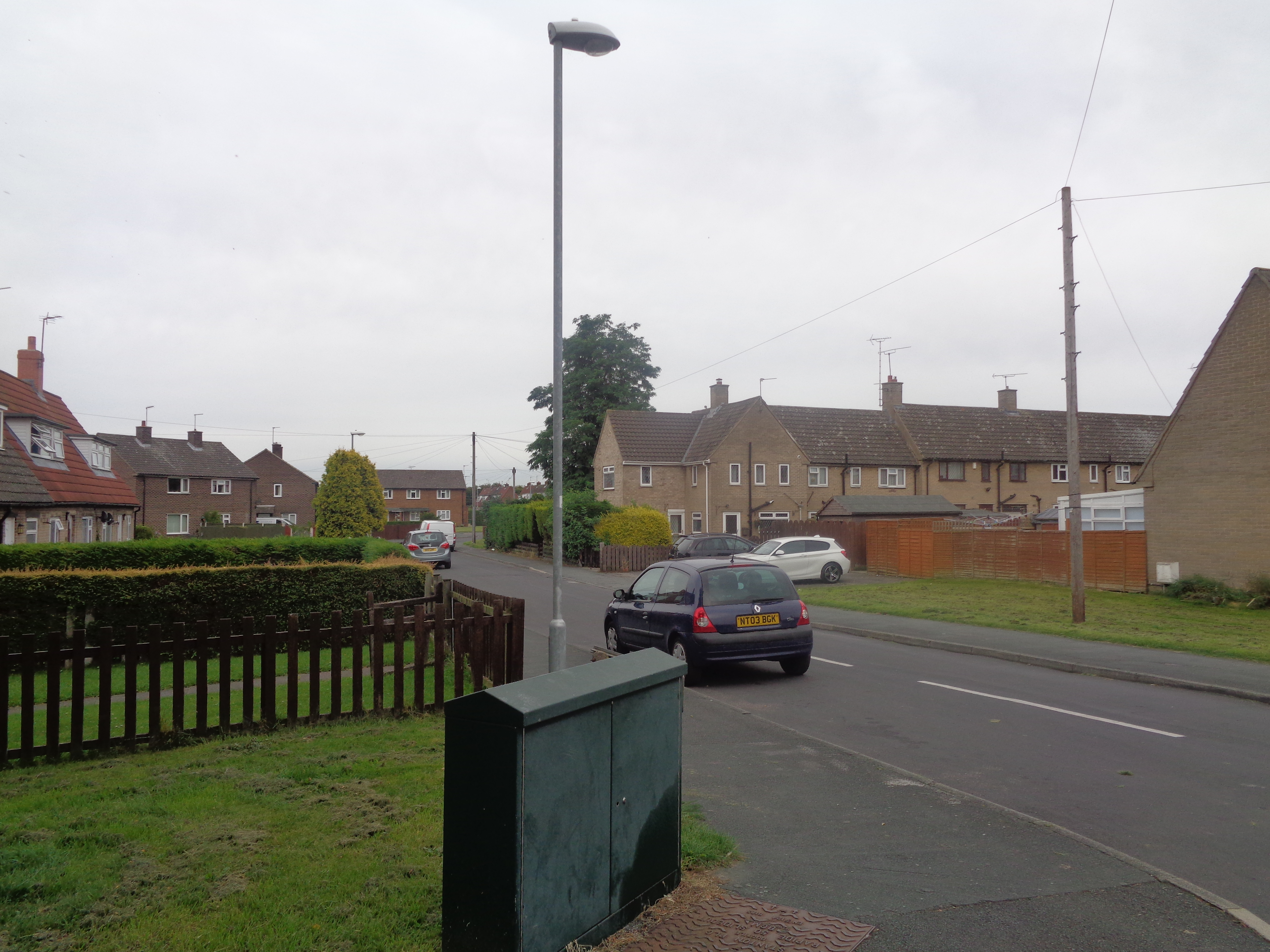
- Housing on Ceres Road

- Location within West Yorkshire
- Metropolitan borough: City of Leeds
- Metropolitan county: West Yorkshire
- Region: Yorkshire and the Humber
- Country: England
- Sovereign state: United Kingdom
- Post town: WETHERBY
- Postcode district: LS22
- Dialling code: 01937
- Police: West Yorkshire
- Fire: West Yorkshire
- Ambulance: Yorkshire
- UK Parliament: Elmet

Hallfield or Hallfields is an area predominantly of council estates in Wetherby, West Yorkshire, England. The area is situated east of the town centre. The area is home to Wetherby High School.

== History and development ==
The Hallfield area was for many years before residential development largely in the grounds of the Hallfield Mansions, a large house which lay derelict for many years until it was replaced in the 2000s by a medical centre. The area was from the 1930s to the 1950s home to the landship, HMS Ceres. Until the post-war years, however, the area remained largely undeveloped. Post war demand for social housing lead to the building of the early parts of the Hallfields Estate in the 1950s. The early parts of the estate centres on First, Second, Third and Fourth Avenue. In the 1960s further council housing was built around Ceres Road, which is separated from the earlier parts by a cemetery. To the North of the estate further houses were built in the 1960s by the Home Office for use by staff at the nearby Wetherby Young Offenders Institution.

== Hallfield today ==
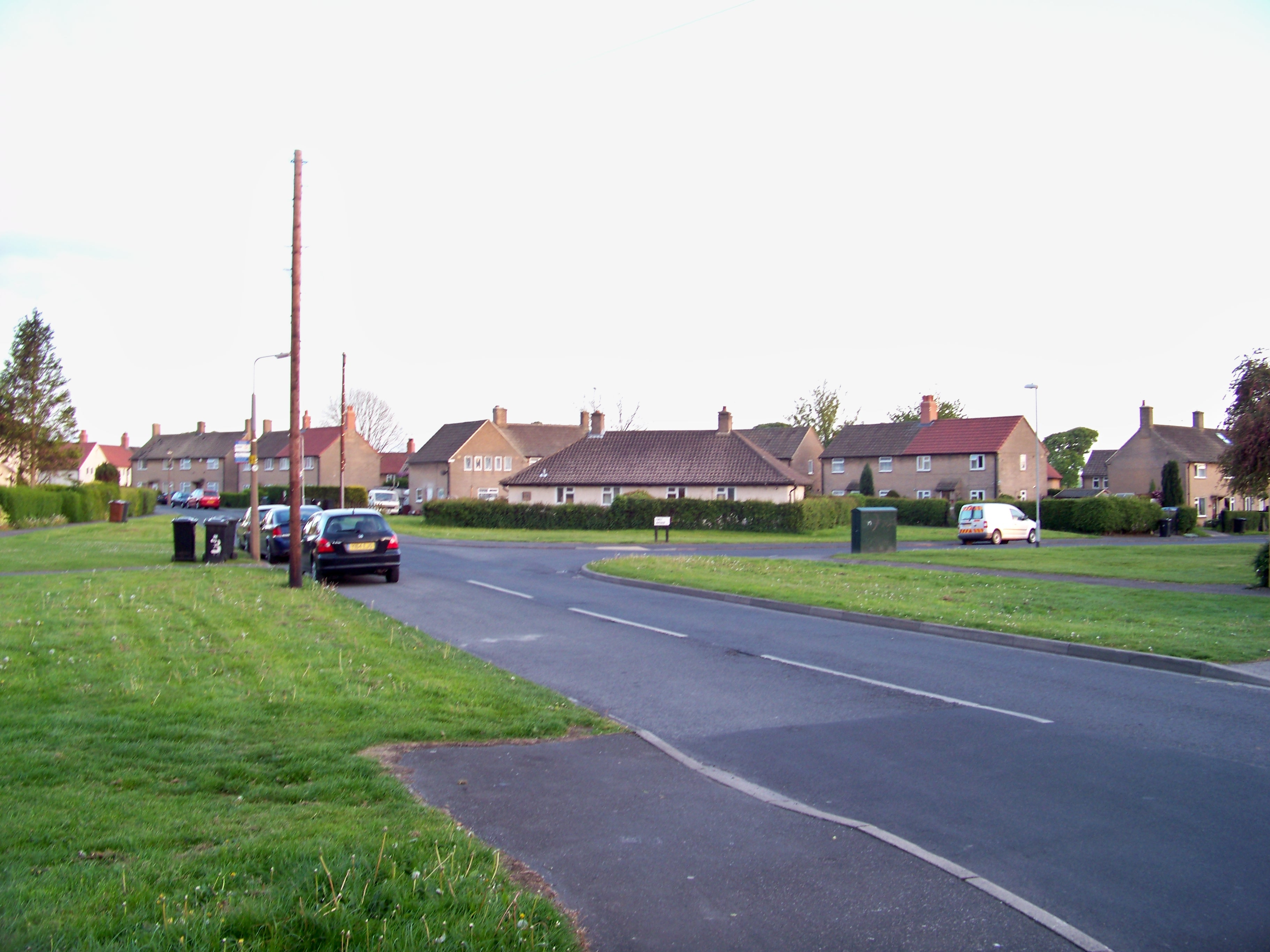
Third Avenue in 2009

Today the estate has fallen into relative disrepair and as a rule, house prices are the cheapest in Wetherby, cheaper than other council estates, such as those around the Ainsty area of the town. Around half of the housing stock on the estates are now privately owned. In 2009 community notice boards were placed around the estate, these provide publicity to local issues and events. Recent problems with anti-social behaviour, particularly around the playing fields, local shops and the Freemans Way underpass have led to Leeds City Council and West Yorkshire Police engaging in a programme of community consultation and increasing police foot-patrols.

In June 2013 the Mason Fields playground was closed by councillors due to public health concerns after the site had been occupied by travellers. Parts of the amenity, as well as the adjacent cemetery, had been used as toilet facilities and the play equipment had been damaged.

== Amenities ==
Hallfield is situated close to Wetherby town centre, and backs onto the Horsefair Shopping Centre, providing easy access to local amenities. The area itself has a newsagent/ off-licence, a community centre, surgery, cemetery, playing fields, junior school, as well as being the location of Wetherby High School. There are bus routes operated by First Leeds which run through the estate linking it with Wetherby bus station, City Square, Leeds as well as Ainsty, Deighton Bar, Collingham, Seacroft, Oakwood and Harehills.

== Housing styles ==
The majority of the housing on the estate is council housing, low rise and mostly 2-3 bedroomed semi-detached and terraced houses. The estate is notable for having many unusual chalet-style terraced houses. The majority of the houses were constructed in the 1950s, however there are some 1970s houses on Burrel Close, the Chase, Freemans Way and Saddlers Walk as well as some 2010s houses built on Hallfield Lane on the site of the former veterinary surgery.

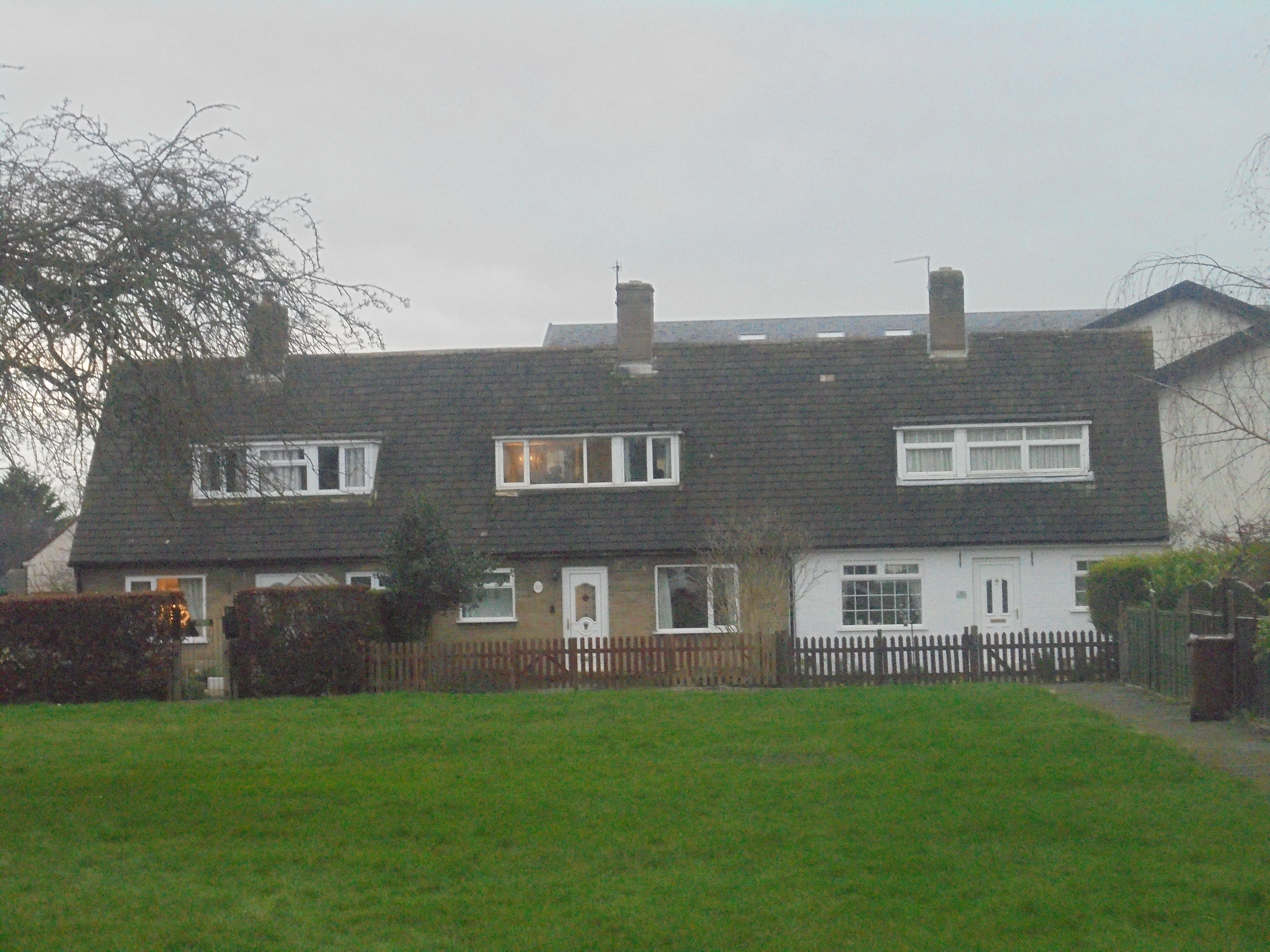
Chalet style terraced houses on First Avenue

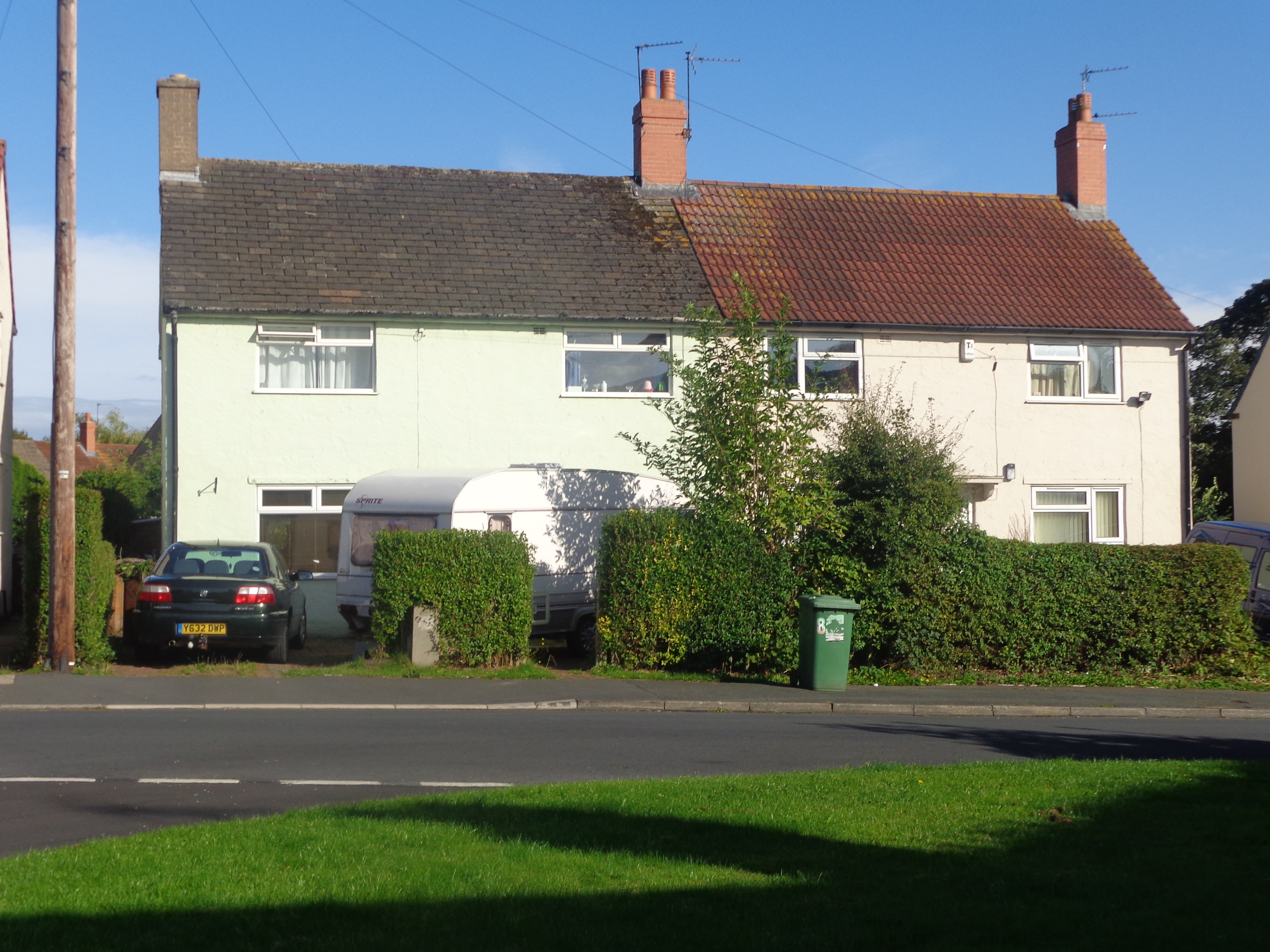
More conventional double-fronted semi-detached houses on Fourth Avenue

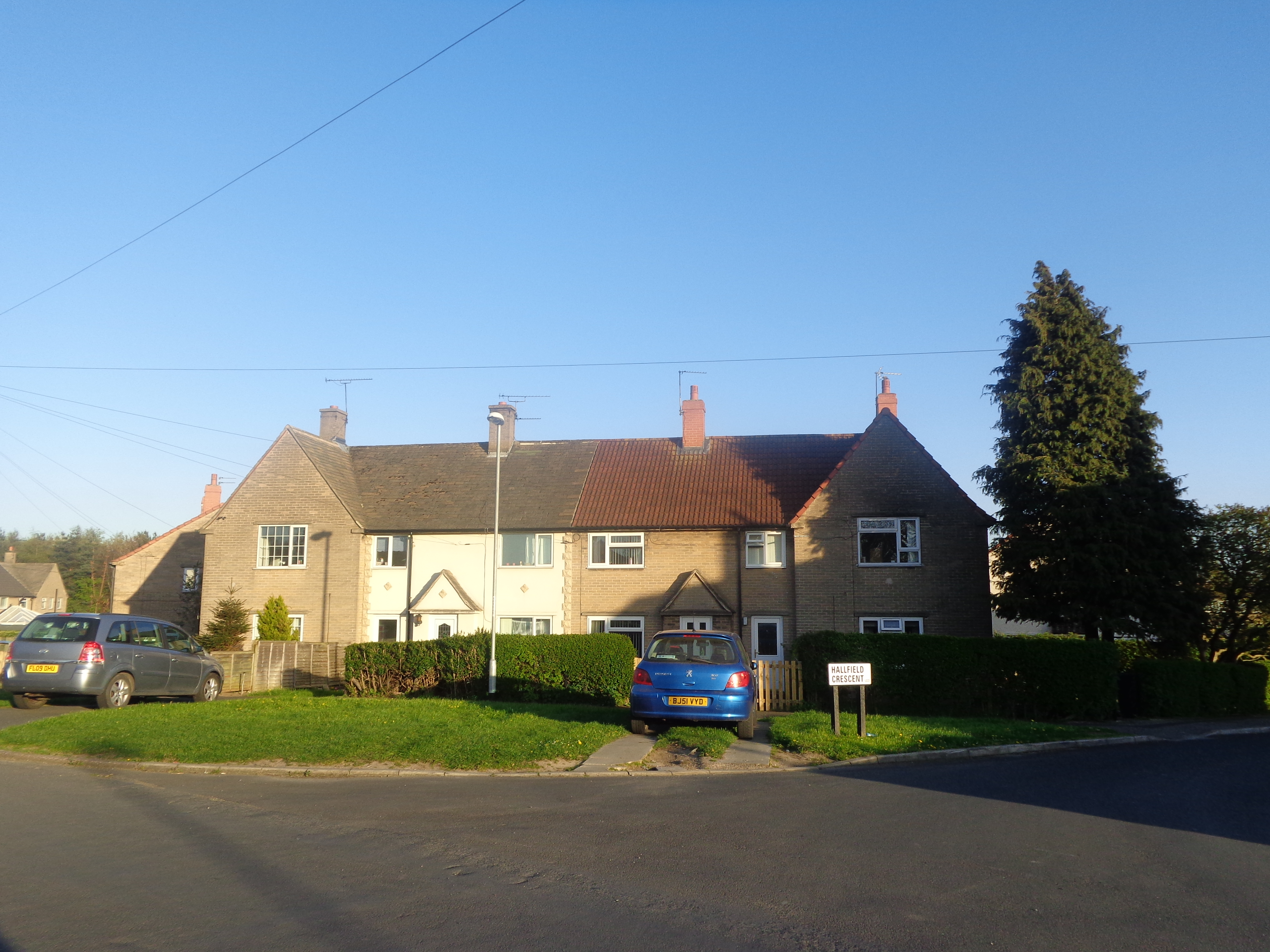
Four-in-a-row terraced houses on Third Avenue

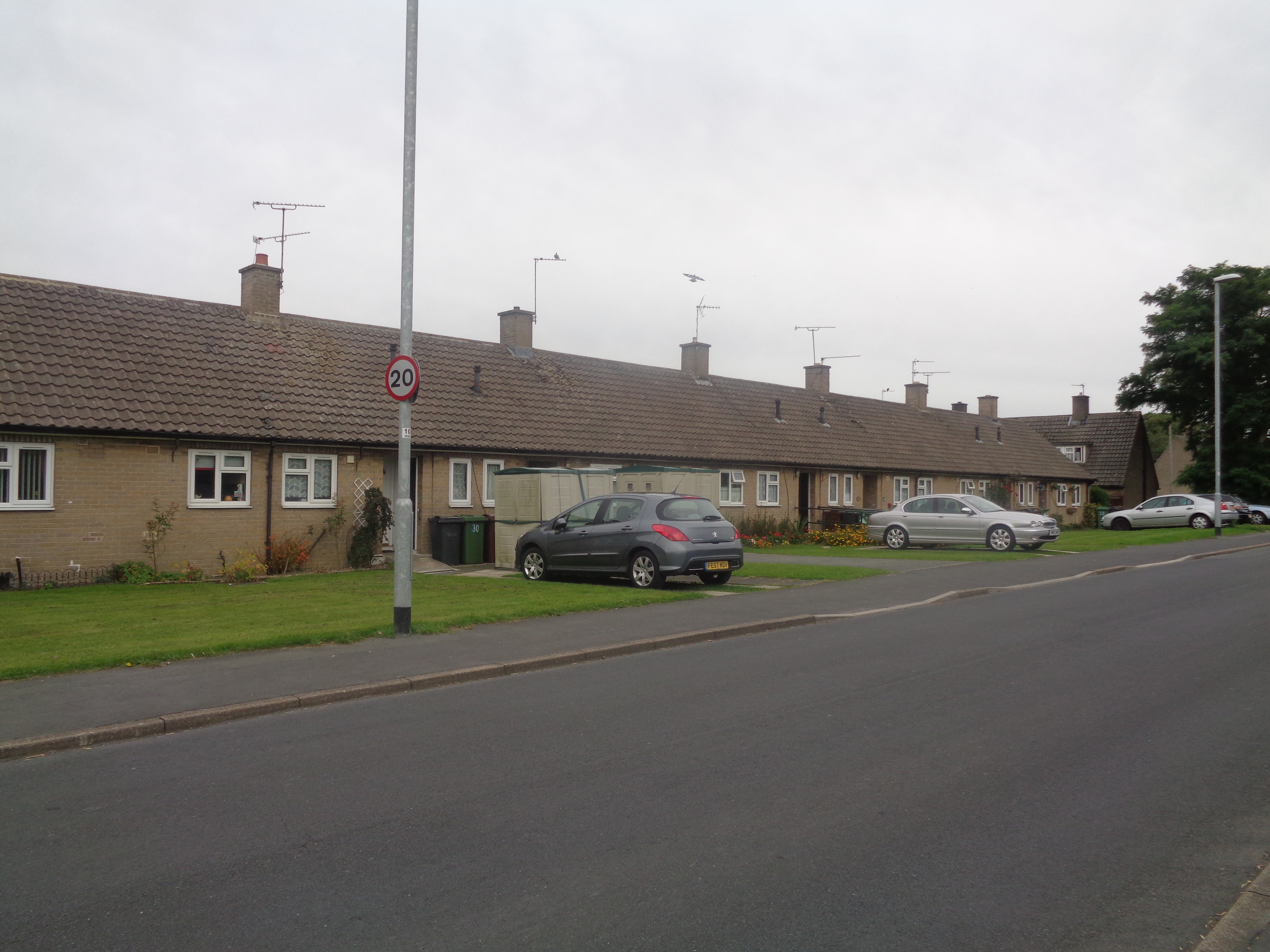
Bungalows on Hallfield Lane

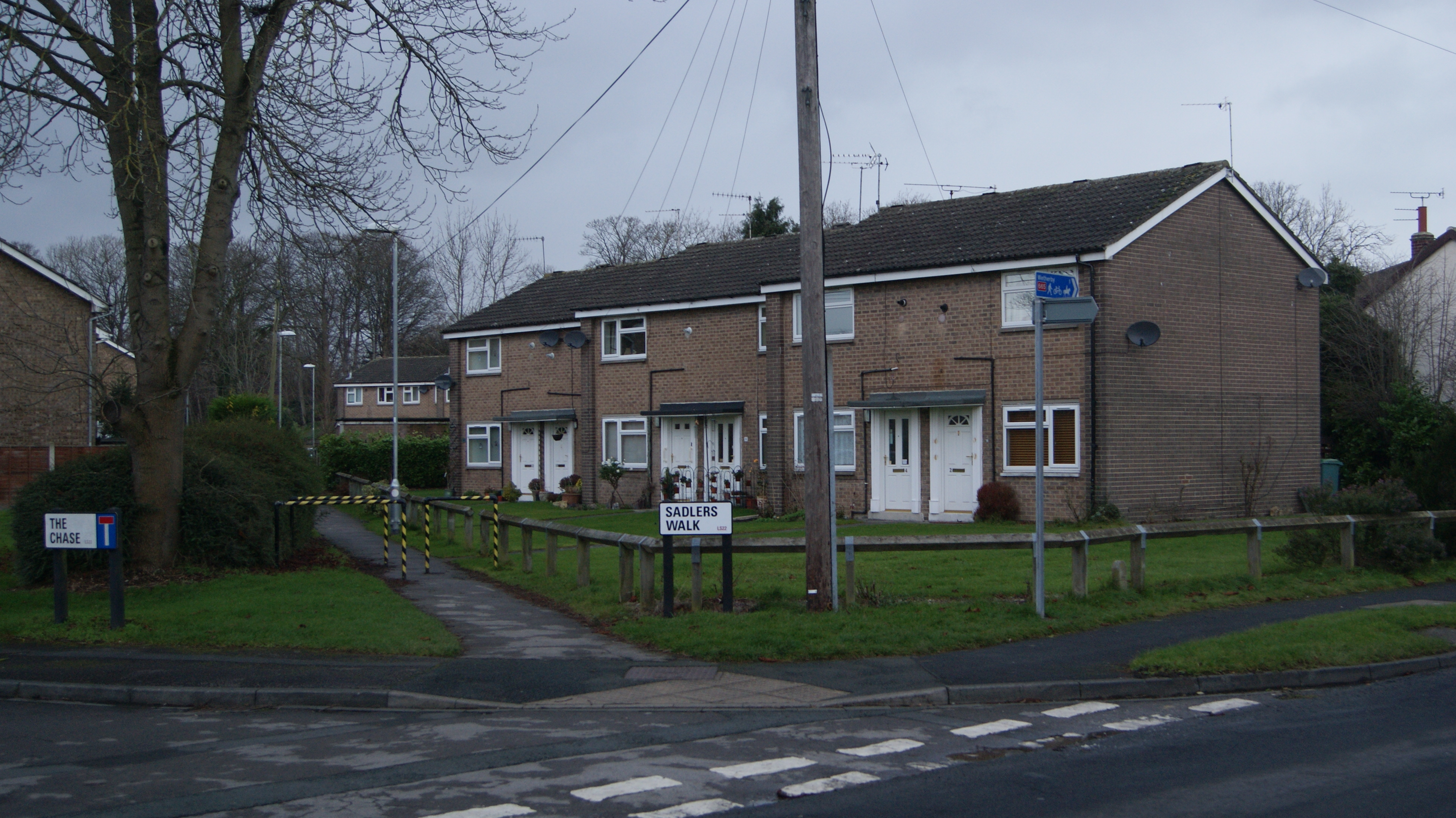
Terraced houses built in a Radburn style arrangement on Saddlers' Walk

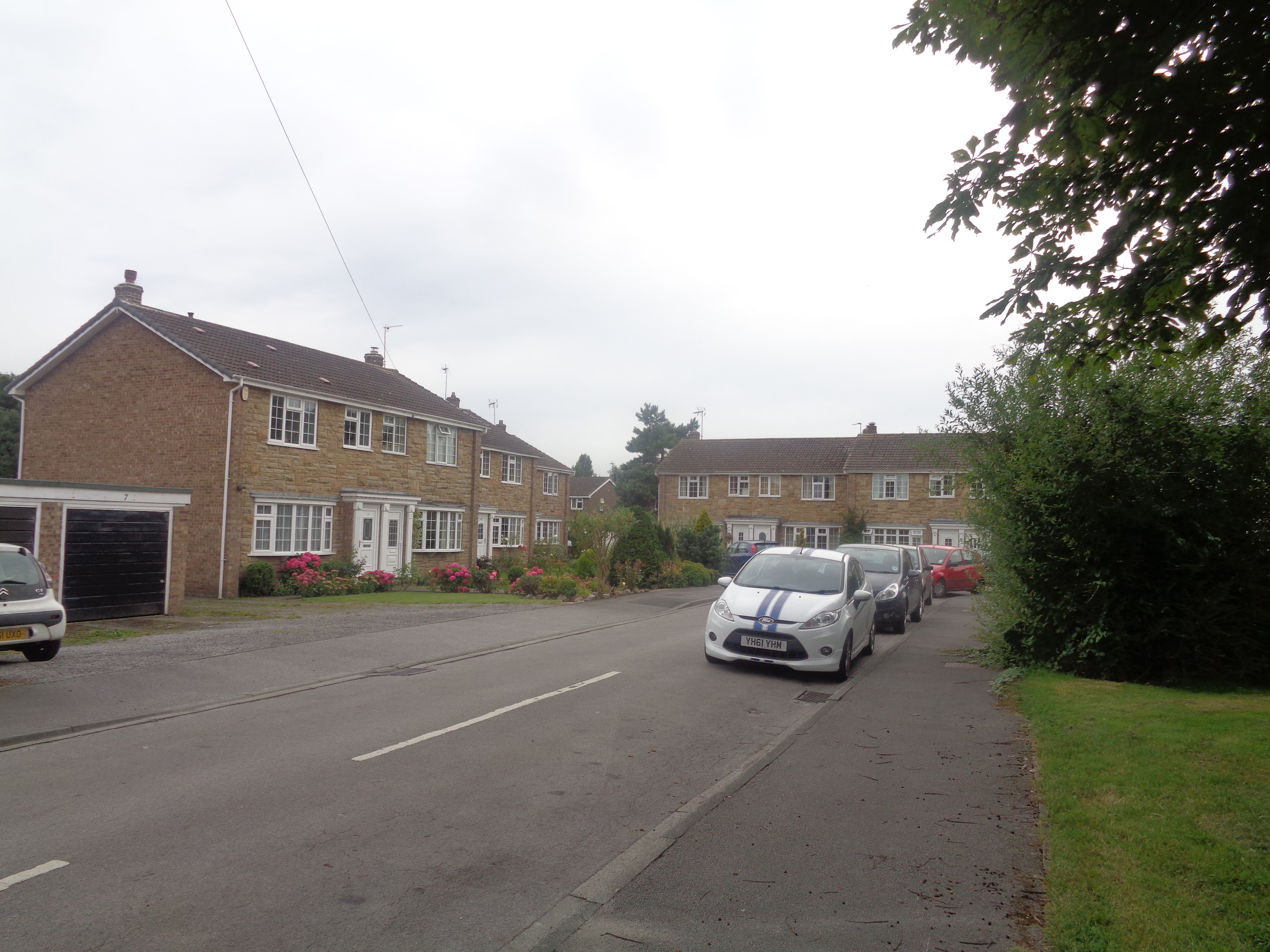
1970s private mews-style terraced houses on the Chase
