= Carr Manor Community School =

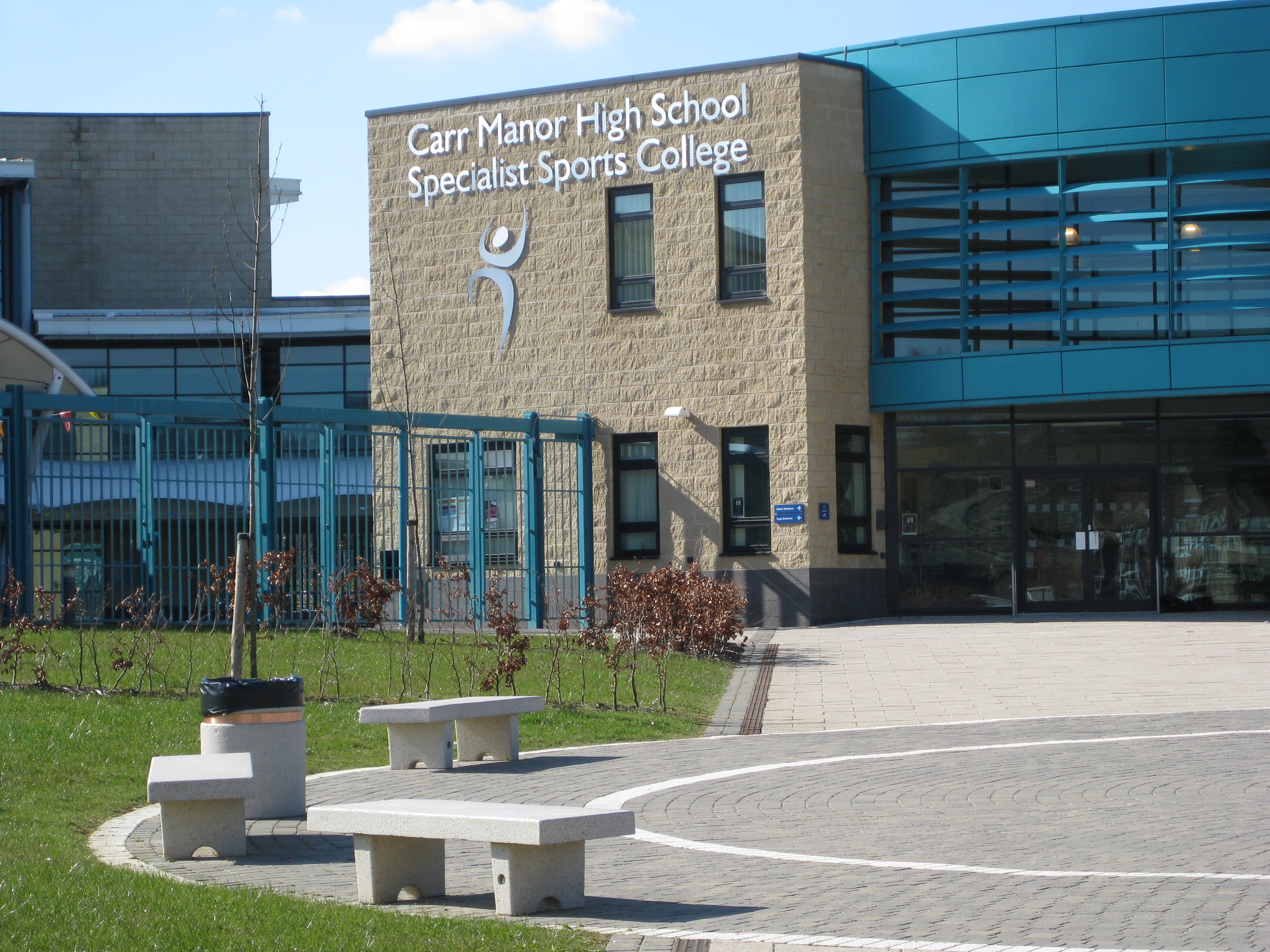

Location
- Carr Manor Road; Leeds, West Yorkshire, LS17 5DJ; England; 53.83453°N 1.55261°W

Information
- Type: Foundation school
- Established: 1992
- Local authority: City of Leeds
- Specialist: Sports
- Department for Education URN: 108059 Tables
- Ofsted: Reports
- Head teacher: Lucie Lakin
- Gender: Mixed
- Age: 2 to 18
- Website: http://www.carrmanor.org.uk/

Carr Manor Community School (formerly Carr Manor High School) is a mixed all-through school located in Leeds, West Yorkshire, England. It was formed from a merger of Lawrence Oates Middle School and Stainbeck High School in 1992 under headmaster Terry Burgon. It is a specialist sports college.

For the new school year in September 2006, as part of a reorganisation of secondary education in Leeds, the school was rebuilt with new staff and a new headmaster, Simon Flowers. Carr Manor was set to lose its sixth form but gain extra buildings, however, the school retained its sixth form along with a new building. The school was earmarked for closure before the new school was built. However, after opposition from politicians, parents, staff and pupils, a new school was built to replace the old two buildings. The school was officially opened by Rt. Hon. Tony Blair, Prime Minister on 15 March 2007. The school opened a primary phase in 2012.

In 2014 the school federated with Wetherby High School.

== Academic standards ==
In the November 2005 Ofsted inspection the school was rated 'Satisfactory' Grade 3, on a four-point scale.

However, in March 2006 the school was rated amongst the 100 most improved schools in the country.

In the latest Ofsted inspection report in February 2025 Carr Manor was rated as 'Outstanding' ref: https://carrmanor.org.uk/wp-content/uploads/2025/03/Carr-Manor-Community-Ofsted-Report-Final-March-25.pdf
