= Wetherby High School =

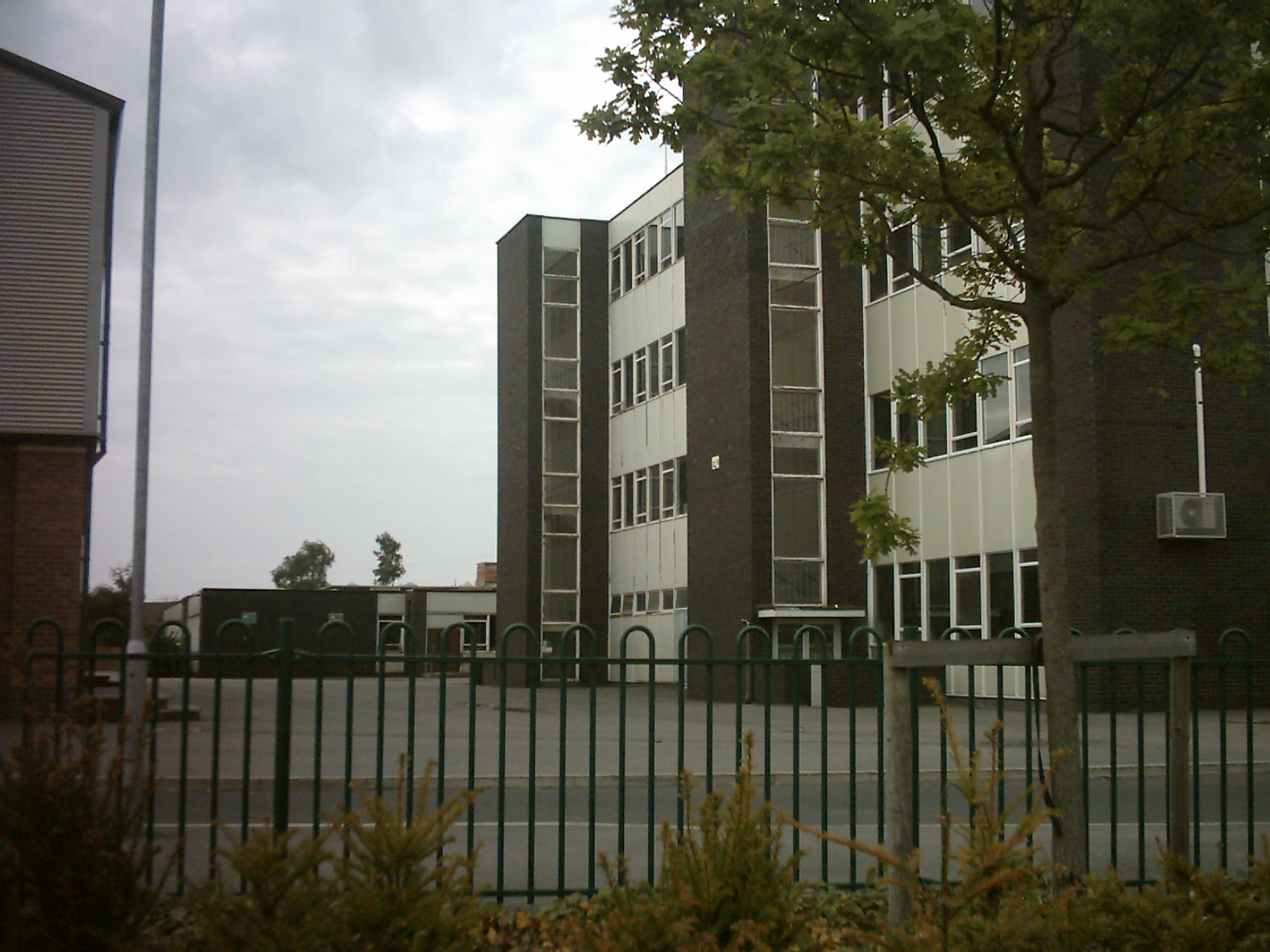

Location
- Hallfield Lane; Wetherby, West Yorkshire, LS22 6JS; England; 53°55′46″N 01°22′51″W

Information
- Type: Secondary school
- Established: 1966
- Founder: Leeds City Council
- Local authority: Leeds City Council
- Trust: Leeds Learning Alliance
- Department for Education URN: 108088 Tables
- Ofsted: Reports
- Headteacher: Samantha Jefferson
- Staff: 80-85
- Gender: Coeducational
- Age: 11 to 16
- Enrolment: 800+(as of 2026)
- Houses: Bremner, Robinson, Tomlinson, Trueman
- Colours: Black and white uniform
- Publication: Coaching Chronicles, Wetherby Roundup, Letters
- Website: http://www.wetherbyhigh.org.uk/

Wetherby High School (formerly Wetherby Secondary Modern School) is a coeducational secondary school located in the Hallfield area of Wetherby, West Yorkshire, England.

The school is run by the City of Leeds Local Education Authority. It is situated on Hallfield Lane, on the Hallfields Estate in Wetherby, and adjacent to the Wetherby Campus of Leeds City College, formerly Park Lane College. The school buildings were frequently used by the college at night. It was formerly a sixth form until it stopped taking in students in 2019.

== History ==
The school is a former secondary modern school (pupils who passed the 11-plus would have most likely attended Tadcaster Grammar School). The school was originally on Crossley Street, but once these premises had become too small for the school, the new site was built in 1966 – the notable feature being a tower block overlooking the car park of The Horsefair Centre; the town's shopping precinct. Crossley Street Primary School now occupies the Victorian buildings of the former secondary modern school.

The school's 2009 Ofsted report rated the school as Grade 2 (Good). Following the October 2012 Ofsted inspection the school was assessed as Grade 3 (Requires improvement) in all areas and for overall effectiveness. After a follow-up February 2013 Ofsted Section 8 monitoring inspection, under the Education Act 2005, the school was judged to have made improvements.

Wetherby High School was a designated Technology College with an academic and vocational curriculum. In February 2010 it became a foundation school, and in partnership with the British Library and the University of York formed 'The Education Trust for Wetherby', a charitable trust that owns the school's land and buildings.

In 2014, The school partnered with Carr Manor Community School.

== Buildings ==
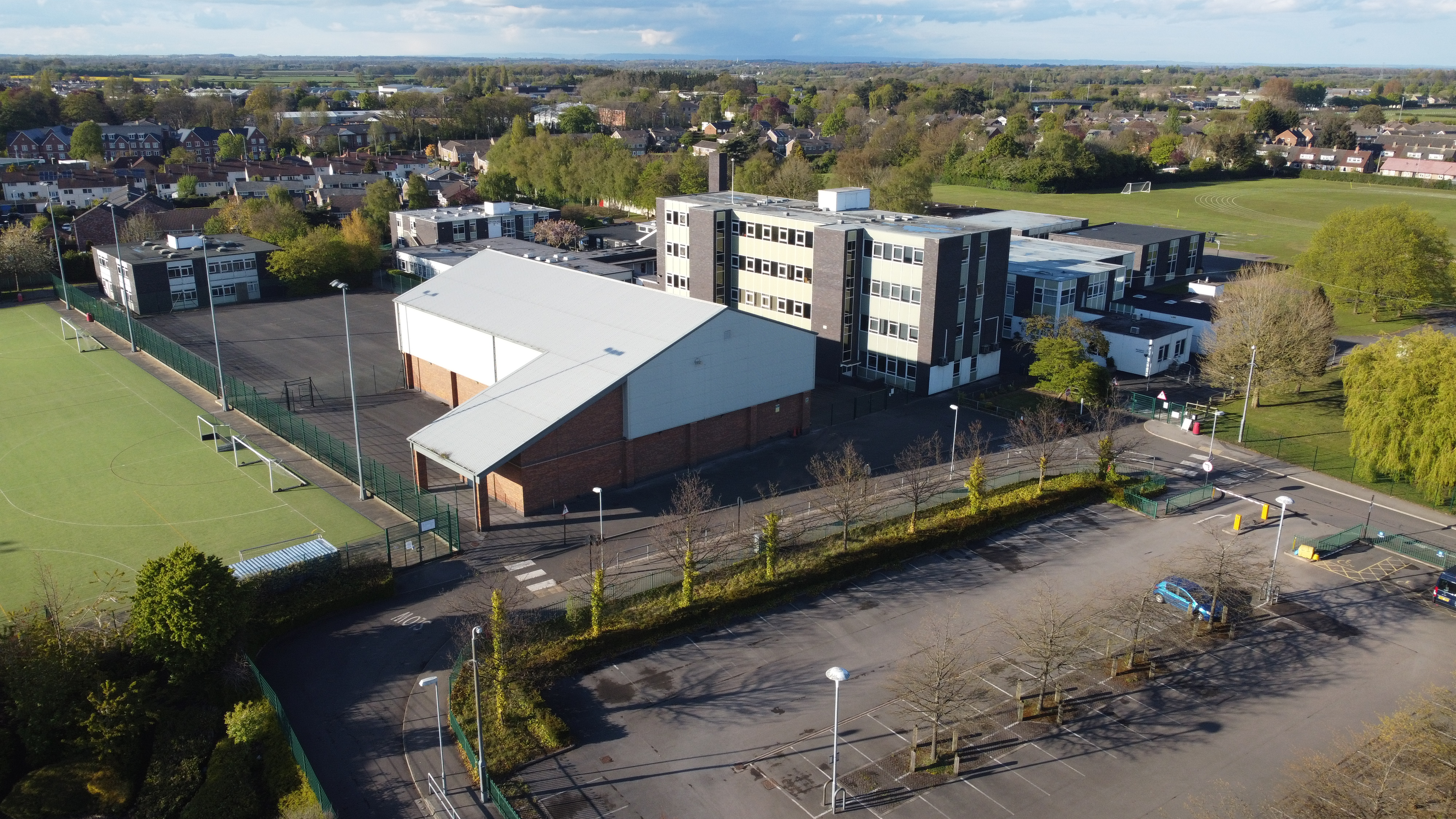
Aerial photographs of the buildings

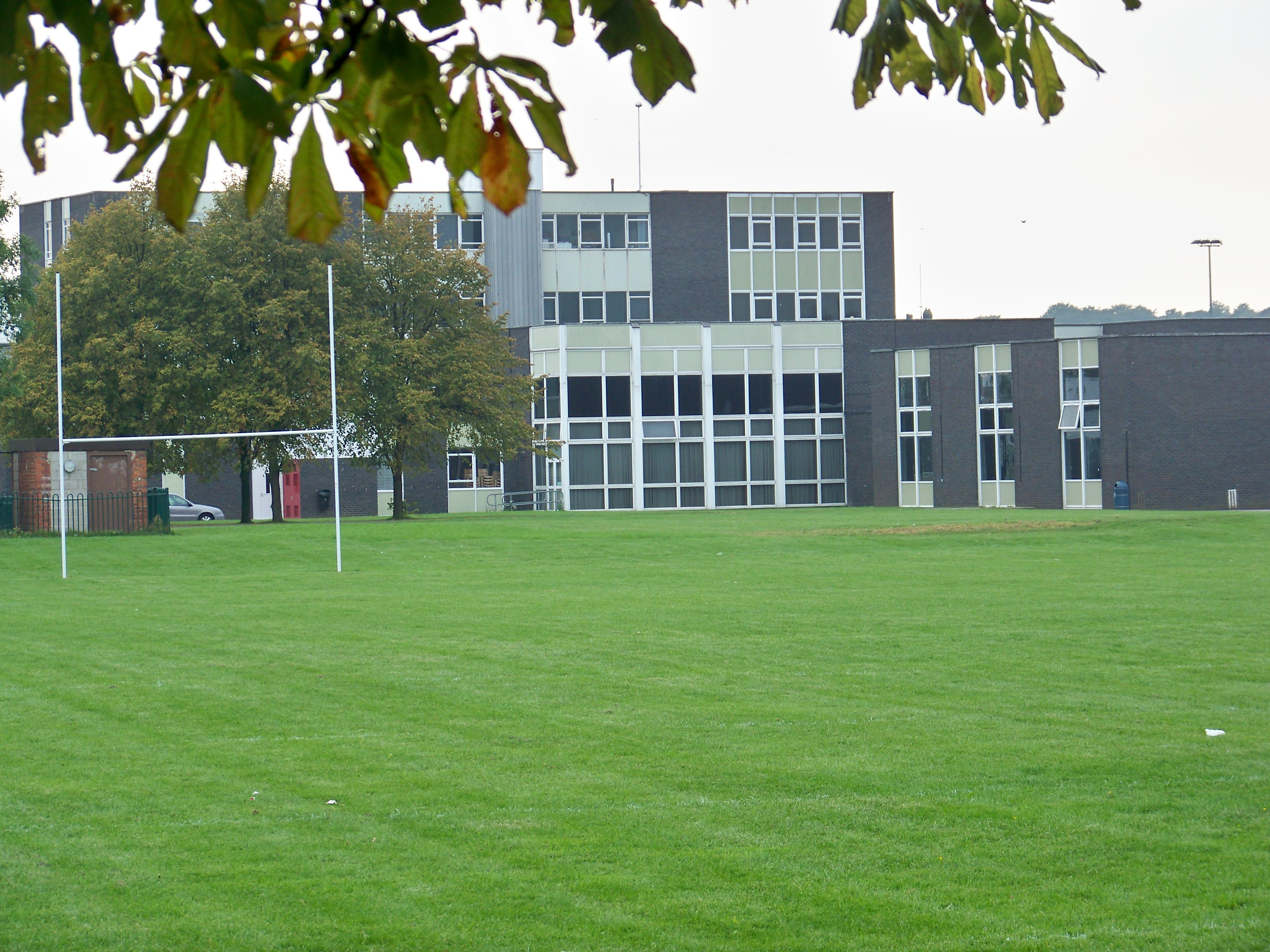
The buildings from the East

The buildings were built in the mid-1960s. Although typically 1960s, and similar to many schools across Leeds, such as East Leeds High School in Seacroft and the former Merlyn Rees Community High School in Belle Isle, they are not of a Brutalist nature. The site is dominated by a main tower block, linked to the school hall by two footbridges, with two protruding stairwells. The site contains a smaller number of older buildings left over from HMS Ceres Landship. Over the years the school's grounds have become considerably smaller with land being sold off for the redevelopment of the Horsefair Shopping Centre and for housing developments on McBride Way. In the early 2010s the pre-1960s buildings were demolished having been replaced by newer buildings; one built in the early 2000s in the courtyard formerly separating the school hall with the tower block.

In 2013 work was undertaken to replace many of the original aluminium-framed windows in the main tower block. Further remedial work has since been undertaken updating the campus; however the main buildings of the site remain fundamentally unchanged since their completion in 1966.

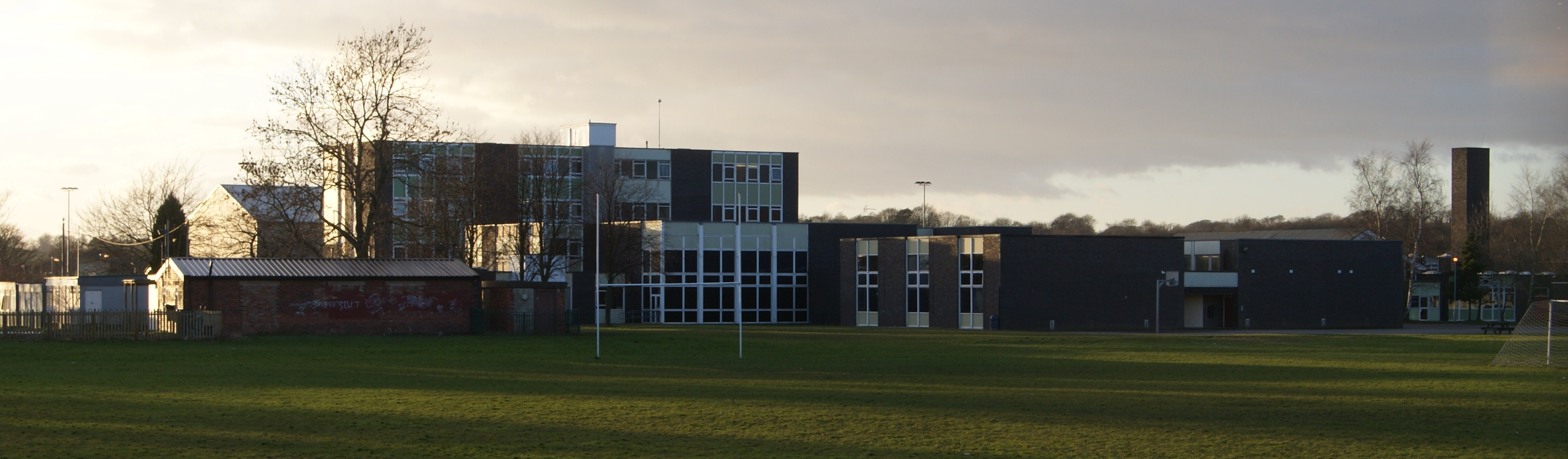
Wetherby High School site seen from the East.

The school had a new sports hall built a few years ago. This was built away from the older buildings to facilitate future developments. The site is maintained in good condition, though now that the buildings are coming to the end of their life cycle the governors have been working with Leeds City Council on options for investment.

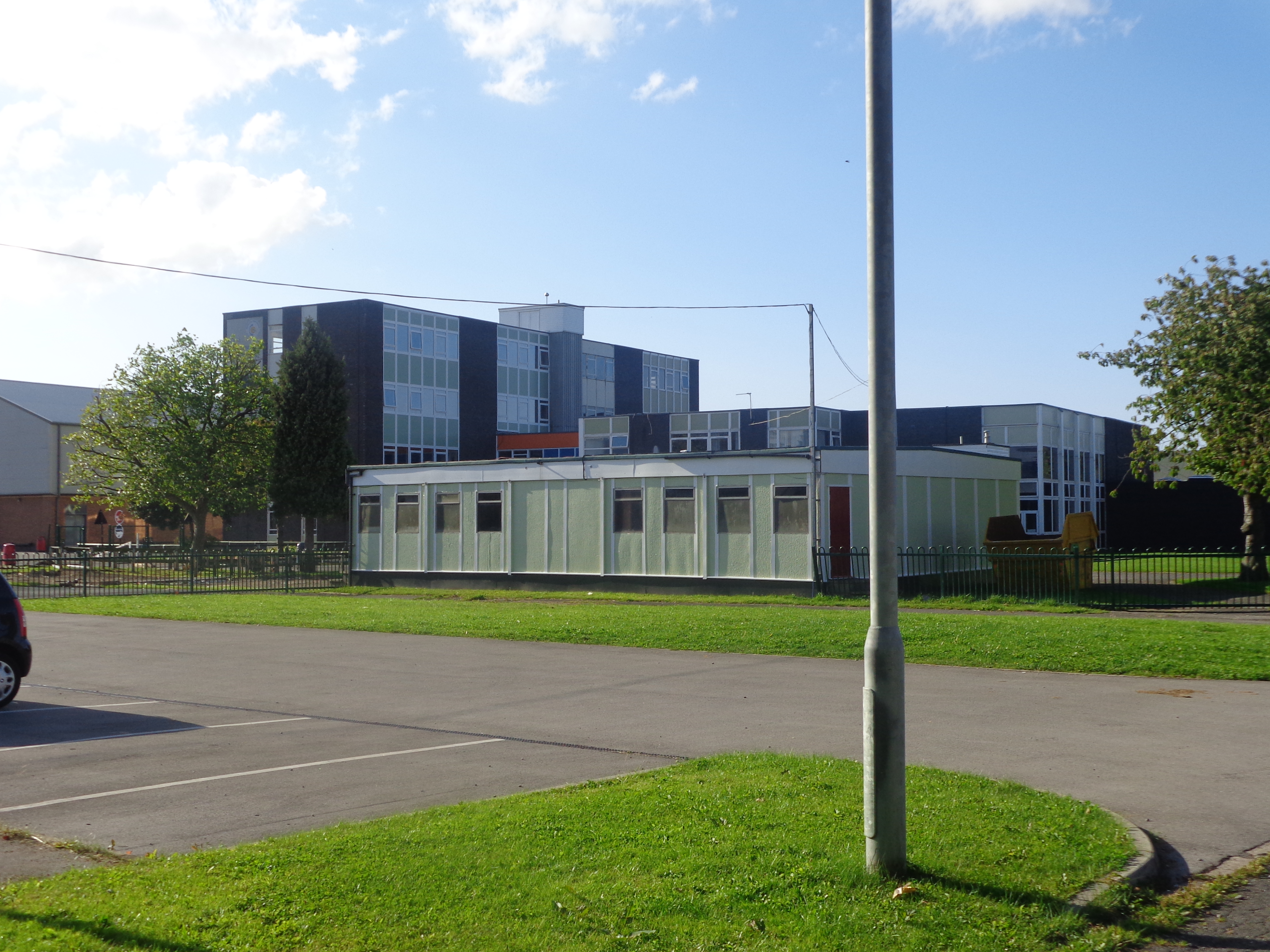
Temporary buildings make up a lot of the site to accommodate the schools expansion in the five decades since it moved to the Hallfield Lane site.

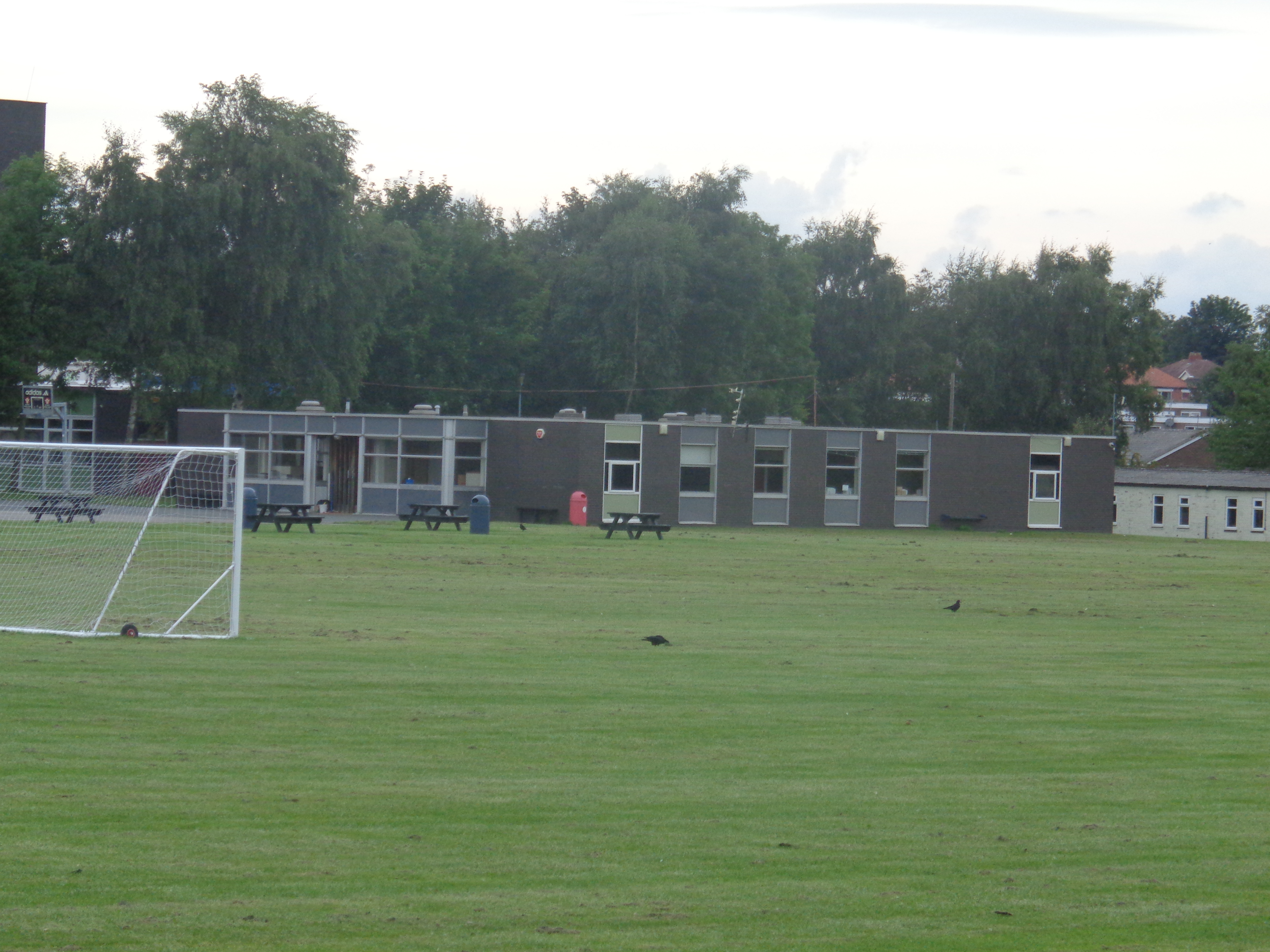
The single storey home economics block

== Proposed incorporation of Boston Spa School ==
In 2018 it was proposed to close nearby Boston Spa School and merge it into Wetherby High School which would be accommodated at a new campus in Wetherby. Both schools have dated campuses with buildings reaching the end of their life cycles.

== Notable alumni ==
- Jessica Barden – actress
- Oliver Lines - Professional Snooker Player
- Kadeena Cox – parasports athlete
- Jon Craig – political journalist
- Natalie Haigh - professional footballer
- Seb Hines – professional footballer
- Stuart Naylor – professional footballer and coach
- Micah Richards – England international footballer
- Primrose Shipman – wife of murderer Harold Shipman
- Wash Westmoreland – film director
