= Leeds College of Building =

Location
- North Street; Leeds, West Yorkshire, LS2 7QT; England
- 53.8029°N 1.5352°W

Information
- Type: Further Education College
- Established: 1960
- Principal & CEO: Nikki Davis
- Staff: 400+
- Gender: Mixed
- Age: 14 to 99
- Enrolment: 6,500
- Website: http://www.lcb.ac.uk/

Leeds College of Building in Leeds, West Yorkshire, England, is the only further education college in the UK which specialises in the construction industry. It was established in 1960 and currently has about 6,500 students.

It has courses ranging from entry level through to degree, focussed on National Vocational Qualifications and Apprenticeships for occupations relevant to the construction and built environment sector. In 2018 they were awarded BTEC Apprenticeship Provider of the Year for their continued development of apprenticeships within the sector.

== Sites ==
The college has two campuses, the North Street campus and the South Bank campus. Sites formerly occupied by the college include properties in Millwright Street Parkside Lane, Lockwood Way and Stourton.

== Courses offered ==
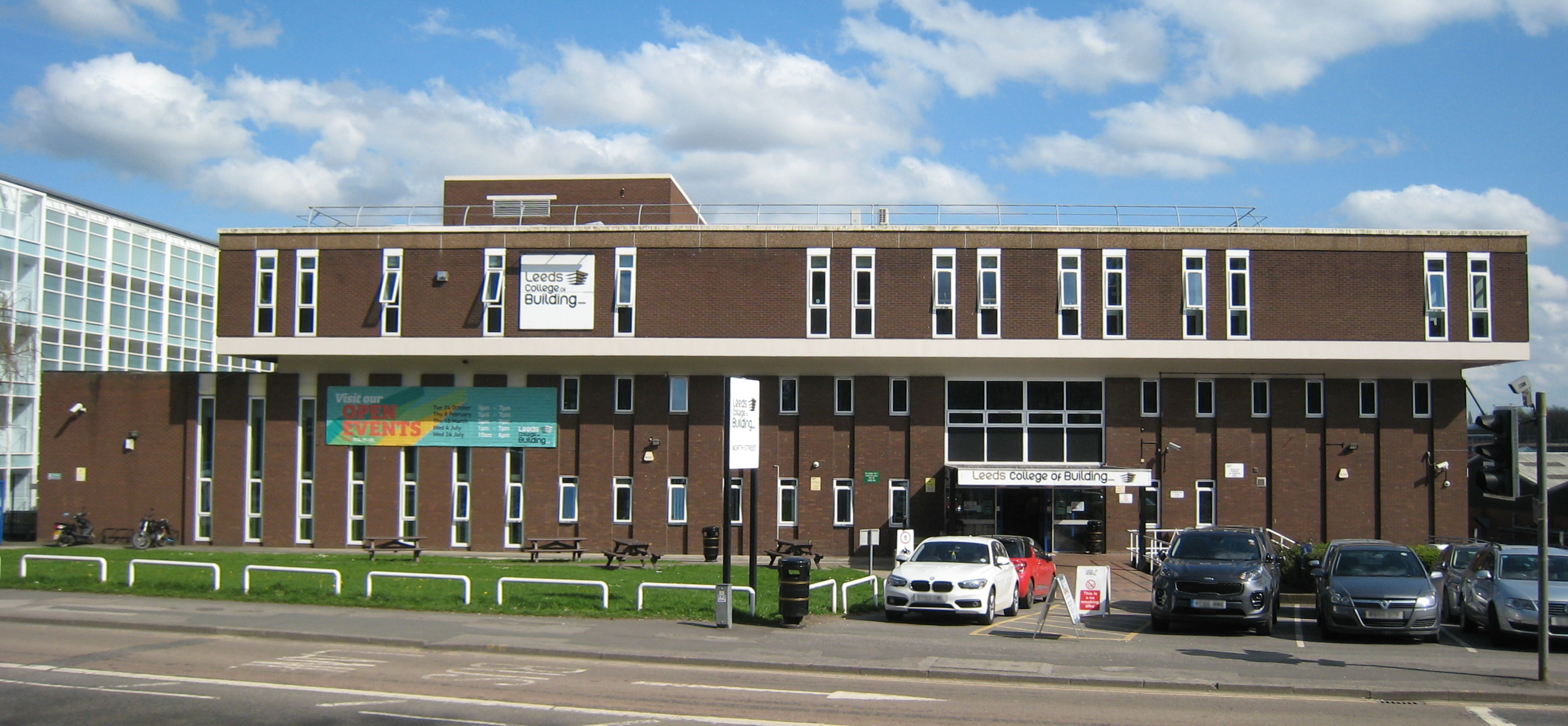
North Street Campus

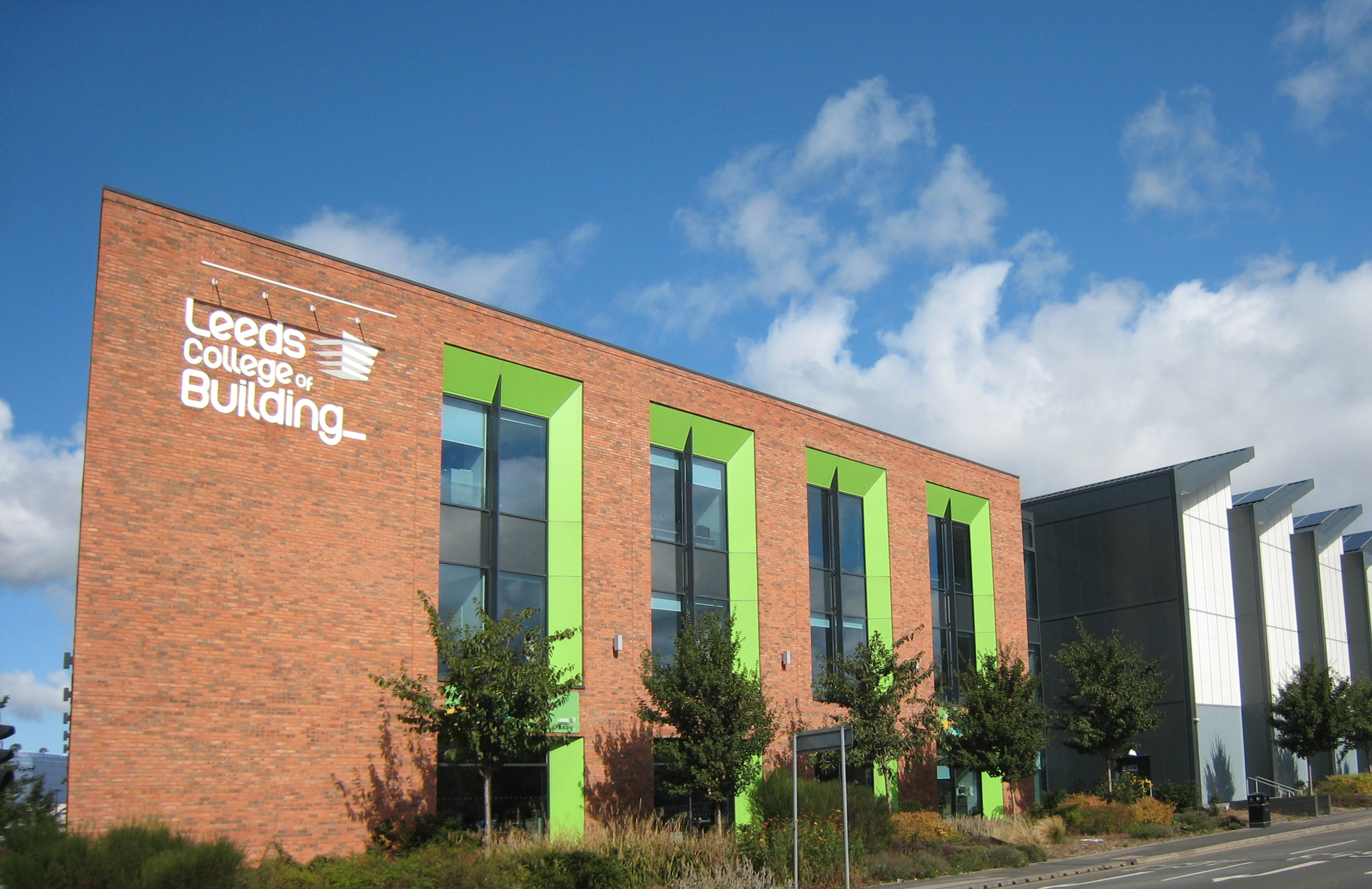
Southbank 1 Campus

The college offers courses in:

- Architectural Technology
- Brickwork
- Building Services Engineering
- Carpentry & Joinery
- Civil Engineering
- Computer Aided Design
- Construction management
- Electrical Installation
- Gas Installation
- Health & Safety
- Heating and Ventilation
- Painting & Decorating
- Plastering/Dry Lining
- Plumbing
- Roofing
- Shop Fitting
- Surveying
- Transport Planning
- Wall & Floor Tiling
- Wood Machining
