= The Morley Academy =

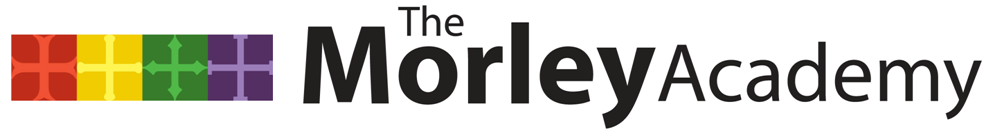

Location
- Fountain Street; Morley, West Yorkshire, LS27 0PD; England; 53.74252°N 1.60757°W

Information
- Type: Academy
- Motto: Exceptional, every day
- Religious affiliation: Mixed
- Established: 1906
- Trust: The GORSE Academies Trust
- Department for Education URN: 136392 Tables
- Ofsted: Reports
- Chair of Governors: Karen Lawson
- CEO: Sir John Townsley
- Principal: Matthew Turton
- Executive Principal: Leanne Griffiths
- Gender: Mixed
- Age: 11 to 16
- Enrolment: 1,581 as of January 2015
- Houses: Moline, Pomme, Clechée, Potent
- Colours: Red, Green, Yellow and Purple
- Website: http://www.morley.leeds.sch.uk/

The Morley Academy is a mixed secondary school located in Morley, West Yorkshire, England.

The school forms part of the Gorse Academies Trust which also includes The Farnley Academy, The Ruth Gorse Academy and the Elliott Hudson College.

== History ==
=== 1906–1930: Morley Secondary School ===
The school was established as Morley Secondary School on 17 September 1906. The school was temporarily situated within the Sunday school premises of St Mary in the Wood Church, before moving to a permanent location on Fountain Street in 1909. The school's foundation stone was laid by Alderman Samuel Rhodes, the Mayor of Morley, in 1907. The first head teacher was John Robinson Airey (1868–1937), a nationally renowned mathematician.

During the First World War pupils at Morley Secondary School raised £5,000 to pay for school uniforms for struggling families in the school. In total, 17 school pupils died during the war. After the war, the school raised over £1,200 to pay for a memorial organ commemorating those who had died.

=== 1930–1975: Morley Grammar School ===
Morley Secondary School became Morley Grammar School in 1930.

In 1963, the school was extended to include a kitchen, main hall, dining room, and sports changing rooms.

=== 1975–2011: Morley High School ===
Morley Grammar School became a mixed comprehensive in 1975, under headmaster J. R. (Ralph) Carr.

In 1996, the school's Assembly Hall was destroyed by fire. Two Second World War plaques were saved from the fire, and re-dedicated in 1999.

=== 2011–present: The Morley Academy ===
In early 2011, Morley High School became The Morley Academy, under the Academies Act 2010.

On 25 June 2012, The Morley Academy hosted the Olympic Torch during its tour of the United Kingdom.

Between 2014 and 2016, The Ruth Gorse Academy operated from temporary facilities within the grounds of The Morley Academy.

In early 2015, the school caused controversy when head teacher Leanne Griffiths announced by letter that the school would withdraw all privileges, such as trips, from pupils where "personal or insulting comments" had been made by their parents on social media, or where there had been any "breakdown in rapport" with the school and that the school was working with police to stop this.

The Morley Academy stopped taking students into its sixth form provision in September 2015 due to the opening of Elliott Hudson College, a dedicated sixth form centre.

== Ofsted ==
An Ofsted inspection in 2006 found the school Grade 3 (Satisfactory) for overall effectiveness, and in 2009, Grade 1 (Outstanding). Ofsted re-evaluated the school with the same Grade 1 rating in 2013.

== Awards and recognition ==
In July 2001, the Arts Council awarded the Morley High School the Silver Level Artsmark. The school was one of three in Leeds and of only thirteen in Yorkshire to be so recognised. The Morley Academy is a Specialist Technology College.

The school is one of only 200 schools in the country that have been awarded Teaching School Status.

The Morley Academy was awarded the British Council's International School Award in 2014, after forming a partnership with Buffelsdale Secondary School in Durban, South Africa.

== Notable former pupils ==
Morley Grammar School

- Karl Harrison, rugby league footballer and coach.
- Brian Turner CBE, chef.
- John R. Womersley, mathematician and computer scientist.
- Edwin Bolland, diplomat.

Morley High School

- Dan Cammish, racing driver.
- Mark Sewards, Labour politician.

== Notable former teachers ==
- Jeremy Jackman, choral director, composer and arranger, and formerly a counter-tenor of the King's Singers
- Adam Priestley, Gibraltar football player.
