= The Farnley Academy =

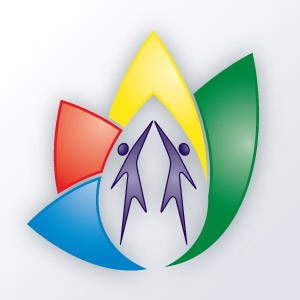

Location
- Chapel Lane; Leeds, West Yorkshire, LS12 5EU; England; 53.78344°N 1.61999°W

Information
- Type: Academy
- Local authority: City of Leeds
- Department for Education URN: 137577 Tables
- Ofsted: Reports
- Chair of Governors: Andy James
- Executive Principal: Sir John Townsley
- Principal: Richard Cooper
- Gender: Mixed
- Age: 11 to 16
- Houses: Bronte House; Asquith House; Moore House; Tomlinson House
- Colours: Silver, Purple
- Website: http://www.farnley.leeds.sch.uk/

The Farnley Academy (formerly Farnley Park Maths & Computing College) is a secondary school serving the Farnley, New Farnley and Wortley wards of Leeds, West Yorkshire, England.

The school forms part of the Gorse Academies Trust which also includes The Morley Academy, The Ruth Gorse Academy and Elliott Hudson College.

== History ==
The Farnley Academy is built on the site of Cow Close Secondary School which became Harrington High, then Farnley Park High and then Farnley Park Maths and Computing College.

In 1995, arsonists caused £2 million worth of damage at the school. In 1997, staff and students at the school celebrated the completion of a new school building by burying a time capsule.

Between 2010 and 2012, Farnley Park High School was refurbished as a part of the government's Building Schools for the Future programme. Sections of the school were demolished and rebuilt, with planning permission approved on the condition that new sports pitches and a new changing area were created. The refurbishments cost £23 million in total.

In February 2012, the school joined the Gorse Academies Trust and was converted into an academy, becoming The Farnley Academy.

The school stopped taking students into its sixth form provision in September 2015 due to the opening of Elliott Hudson College, a dedicated sixth form centre.

== Facilities ==
The Farnley Academy shares a site with a centre for children with complex needs, the West SILC. The site opened in February 2012.

== Incidents ==
In November 2019, Leeds City Council accused the school of off-rolling Year 11 students into an alternative provision which was also run by the GORSE Academies Trust. This led to an Ofsted inspection, during which it noted that the school 'could not convincingly explain' why it was in the pupils' best interests to move them to the provision, and after which the school received a rating of 'Requires Improvement'. The school returned to an 'Outstanding' rating after an inspection in 2023.

In February 2023, a three-day student protest was organised surrounding the school's toilet policies. The school responded by stating that they allow students to use the toilet during lessons where necessary, however they 'strongly encourage' doing so outside of lessons. The protest coincided with the teacher strikes organised by the National Education Union.

== Notable alumni ==
- Leigh Francis, television presenter
- Kalvin Phillips, footballer
