= Bruntcliffe Academy =

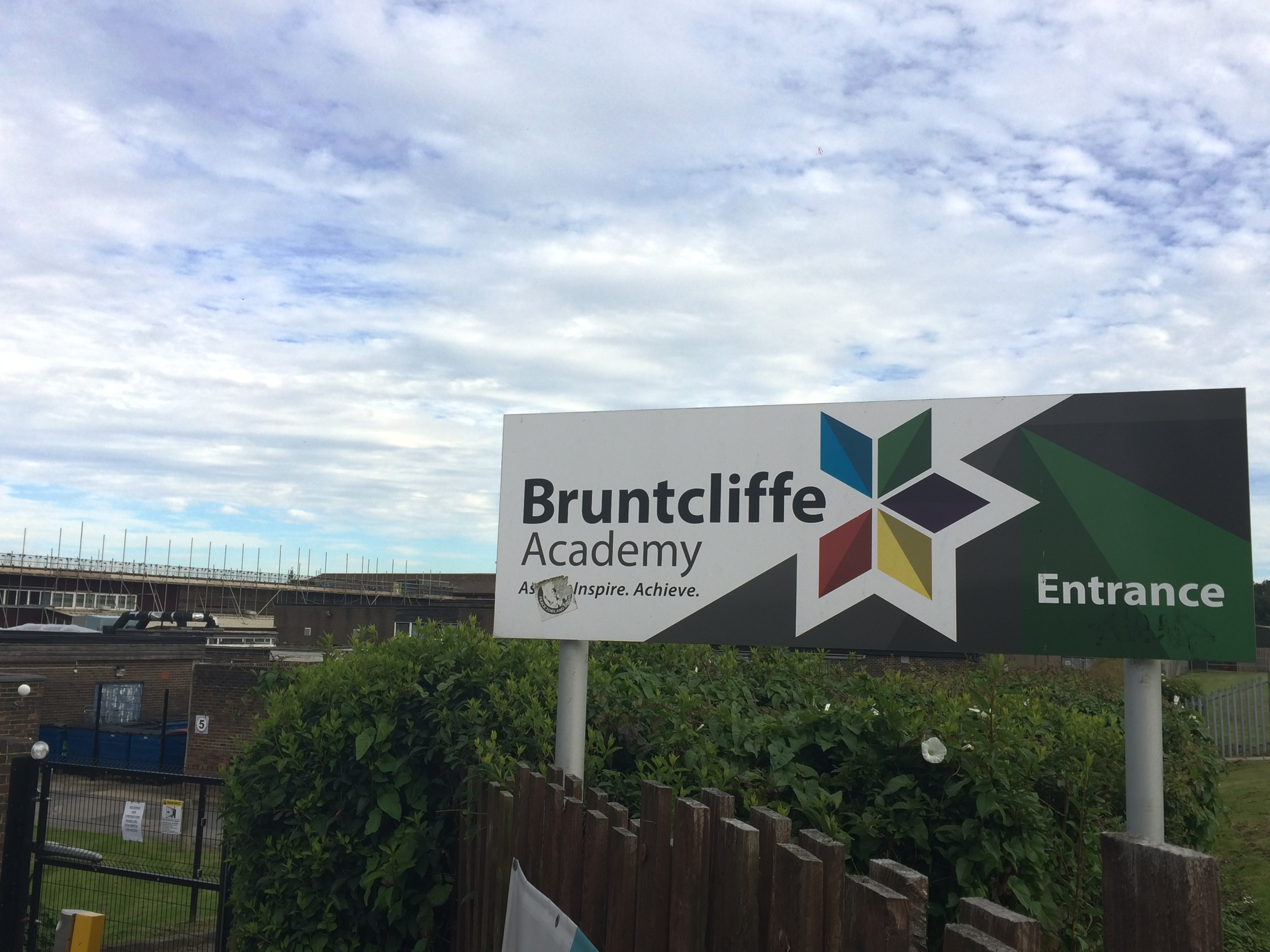

Location
- Bruntcliffe Lane; Morley, West Yorkshire, LS27 0LZ; England
- 53.74562°N 1.61946°W

Information
- Type: Academy
- Motto: Productivity. Community. Integrity. Inclusivity. Ambition.
- Local authority: Leeds City Council
- Department for Education URN: 142056 Tables
- Ofsted: Reports
- Principal: Pascoe Gill
- Gender: Mixed
- Age: 11 to 16
- Colours: Blue, yellow, red, green
- Website: Official website

Bruntcliffe Academy (formerly Bruntcliffe School) is a coeducational secondary school located in Morley, West Yorkshire, England. It is situated on Bruntcliffe Lane in Morley, and is one of three secondary schools in the area.

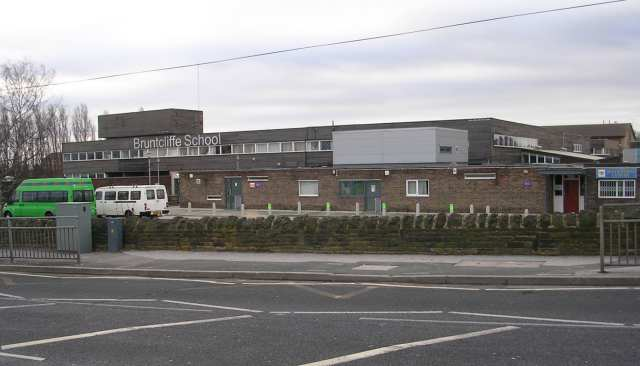
Bruntcliffe School in 2008

== History ==
Bruntcliffe Secondary School was built in the early 1960s on land adjacent to Bruntcliffe Lane. The arrival of the school saw the closure of Margetson County Secondary School in Drighlington.

In 2011, the school became a part of the Bruntcliffe Co-operative Learning Trust. In 2015, the school was transferred to the GORSE Academies Trust and became known as Bruntcliffe Academy.

== Ofsted ==
In February 2018, Bruntcliffe Academy was inspected by Ofsted for the first time since it became an academy. Ofsted judged the school to be 'Good' overall. In addition to this, they judged Leadership and Management, Teaching and Learning, Personal Development and Welfare to be 'Outstanding'.

== Notable former pupils ==
- Jack Broadbent, Rugby player
- Beverley Callard, actress
- Jonathan Howson footballer
