= The Ruth Gorse Academy =

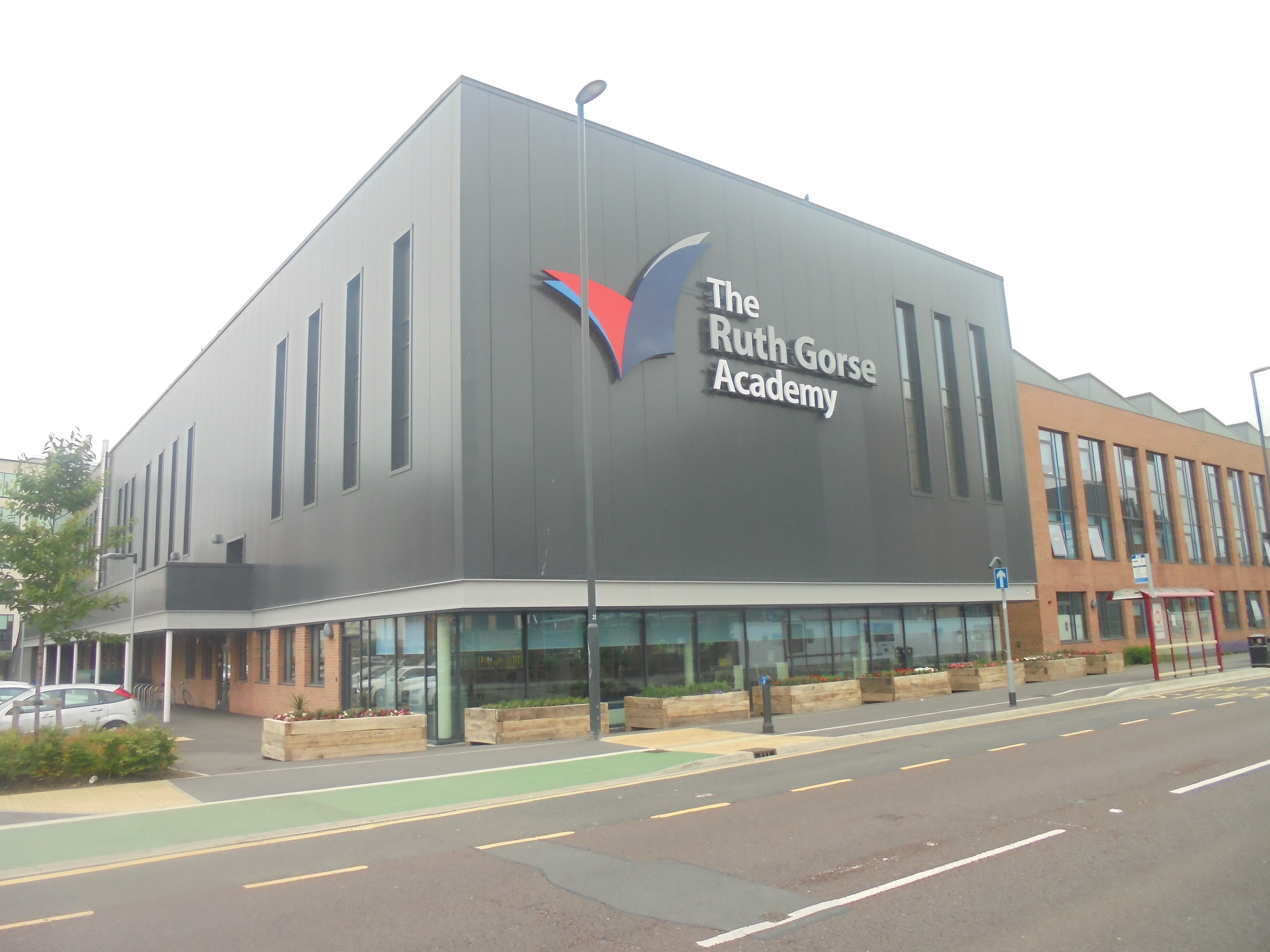

Location
- Black Bull Street; Leeds, West Yorkshire, LS10 1HW; England; 53.79083°N 1.53528°W

Information
- Type: Academy
- Motto: Dare to achieve beyond what you are today
- Religious affiliation: Mixed
- Established: 2014
- Trust: The GORSE Academies Trust
- Department for Education URN: 140565 Tables
- Ofsted: Reports
- Chair of Governors: Stephen Hall
- CEO: Sir John Townsley
- Principal: Saba Mir
- Deputy Chief Executive Officer: Leanne Griffiths
- Gender: Mixed
- Age: 11 to 16
- Enrolment: 1274 as of July 2024
- Houses: Chapman, Hersh, Maretta, Sinfield
- Colours: Red, Green, Yellow and Blue
- Website: https://www.ruthgorse.leeds.sch.uk/

The Ruth Gorse Academy is a mixed secondary school located in Leeds, West Yorkshire, England.

The school forms part of the Gorse Academies Trust which also includes The Farnley Academy, The Morley Academy and Elliott Hudson College.

== History ==
The Ruth Gorse Academy opened in September 2014, and was initially based in the grounds of The Morley Academy. The school was named after a local teacher who died of cancer. In 2016, the school moved into a building constructed on a site formerly owned by Yorkshire Chemicals, which cost £23 million to build.

In July 2017, concerns were raised over the decision to appoint Liam Nolan as the school's principal, as he had previously resigned from the Perry Beeches Academy Trust after being criticised by the Education Funding Agency for 'significant weakness in financial management'. The school defended their decision to appoint him, describing themselves as a 'non-judgemental employer' and that they were 'entirely satisfied' Nolan had learnt from his mistakes. Nolan left the school in November 2017.

Teachers from the Ruth Gorse Academy were involved in the National Education Union strikes in February 2023.

In October 2023, the school received the 'Secondary Provision of the Year' award at the National Association for Special Education Needs awards. In December 2023, the school was rated as Outstanding by Ofsted for the second time, having previously been assessed in 2017.
