= Cockburn School =

Secondary school in Beeston, West Yorkshire, England

Coordinates: 53°45′38.5″N 1°33′32.1″W

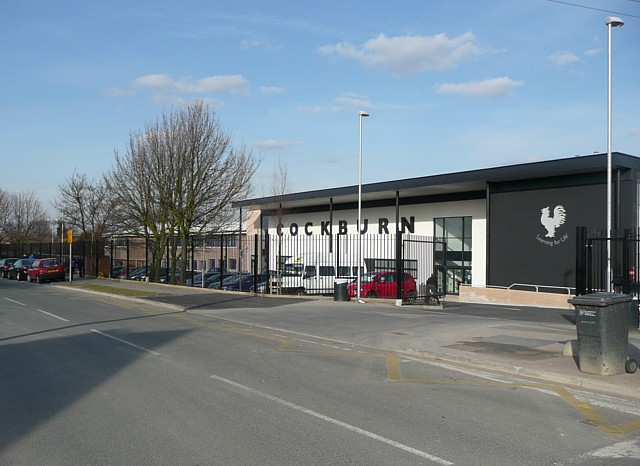

Location
- Parkside; Gipsy Lane; Beeston; Leeds, West Yorkshire, LS11 5TT; England

Information
- Type: Academy
- Motto: Learning For Life
- Established: 7 July 1902
- Local authority: Leeds City Council
- Trust: Cockburn MAT
- Department for Education URN: 142585 Tables
- Ofsted: Reports
- Gender: Mixed
- Age: 11 to 16
- Enrolment: 1,262 (February 2022)
- Website: http://www.cockburnschool.org/

Cockburn School (formerly Cockburn High School) is a mixed secondary school located in the Beeston area of Leeds, West Yorkshire, England.

The original school on this site was Parkside secondary modern, which was an all-boys school. The headmaster for much of the time was Mr C Wadsworth.

It was previously a foundation school administered by Leeds City Council and The Learning Trust (South Leeds). The Learning trust also includes Beeston Primary School, Clapgate Primary School, Hugh Gaitskell Primary School, Lane End Primary School, Middleton Primary School, Middleton St Mary's CE Primary School, St Philip's RC Primary School and Westwood Primary School. However, Cockburn School was converted to academy status in February 2016. The school is now part of a multi-academy trust, and hopes that other schools within The Learning Trust (South Leeds) will convert to academy status and join the trust, whilst continuing to work closely with the partner schools.

Cockburn School offers GCSEs and BTECs as programmes of study for pupils. The school also has a specialism in the performing arts.

== History ==
Cockburn School was opened on 17 July 1902, on land near the corner of Dewsbury Road and Burton Road. The site had previously housed Southern Higher Grade School. Cockburn School was named after Sir George Cockburn, a former chairman of the Leeds School Board.

In the 1980s, the school moved to the former Parkside County Secondary School on Gipsy Lane. The original location of the school eventually became the site of Hunslet Moor Primary School.

The school underwent a full refurbishment in 2010 under the Building Schools for the Future scheme, allowing 210 students per year group to be accommodated.

Cockburn School announced plans to become an academy in October 2015; the conversion was completed in February 2016, under the Academies Act 2010. In June 2016, the school became the founding member of the Cockburn Multi-Academy Trust.

== School life ==
Cockburn School contains a business known as The Glassroom, developed by Education Leeds, in which students recycle unwanted glass to make new products. The Glassroom produces a product each year to be presented at the White Rose Centre Community Awards.

== Awards and recognition ==
In October 2019, the Arts Council awarded Cockburn School the Platinum level Artsmark.

== Notable former pupils ==
- Norman Ackroyd, Artist
- Jordan Baldwinson, rugby league player
- Mandip Gill, actor
- Willis Hall, playwright
- Richard Hoggart, academic
- Harry Jepson, rugby league administrator
- Manasse Mampala, professional footballer
- Geoffrey Warnes, RAF squadron leader
