= Listed buildings in Leeds (Beeston and Holbeck Ward) =

Beeston and Holbeck is a ward in the metropolitan borough of the City of Leeds, West Yorkshire, England. It contains 24 listed buildings that are recorded in the National Heritage List for England. Of these, two are listed at Grade II*, the middle of the three grades, and the others are at Grade II, the lowest grade. The ward is to the south of the centre of Leeds, it contains the areas of Beeston and Holbeck, and is largely residential. Most of the listed buildings are houses and associated structures. In the ward is Holbeck Cemetery, which contains listed buildings including a memorial. The other listed buildings include a farm building, churches and associated structures, churches later used for other purposes, former schools and associated structures, a railway viaduct, a railway underbridge, and a public house.

== Key ==
Grade	Criteria
II*	Particularly important buildings of more than special interest
II	Buildings of national importance and special interest

== Buildings ==
Name and location	Photograph	Date	Notes	Grade
The Manor House, Cad Beeston; 53.77840°N 1.55783°W		1420	A timber framed house that was extended in the early 19th century, restored in 1985, and used for other purposes. There are two bays, with stone infill, and the building contains doorways and mullioned windows.	II*
Stank Hall; 53.75757°N 1.56883°W	—	Late 15th century	A timber framed house encased in stone in the 17th century and later altered. The front wall is in gritstone, the rear and south walls are in brick, and the roof is in stone slate. The house has quoins, two storeys and two bays. The central doorway has a fanlight, and the windows are sashes.	II
Stank Hall Barn; 53.75791°N 1.56865°W	—	Late 15th to early 16th century	A chapel and barn, partly timber framed and partly in millstone grit, with stone slate roofs. The building consists of a main range with seven bays, and a two-storey cross-wing with two bays. In the main range are opposing barn doors and slit vents, and in the cross-wing are mullioned windows with hood moulds, rebuilt doorways, and an ogee-arched doorway in the upper floor.	II*
New Hall; 53.75739°N 1.56882°W	—	17th century	The house, which has been altered and divided into three, is in gritstone with quoins and a stone slate roof. There are three storeys and the east front is gabled. This front contains a doorway, mullioned windows with hood moulds in the top floor, and replacement sash windows in the lower floors, those in the middle floor with a continuous hood mould. Elsewhere, are similar openings, some blocked, including loading doors.	II
Cad Beeston; 53.77836°N 1.55774°W		Early 19th century	A house in rendered brick with stone dressings and a hipped slate roof. There are two storeys and three bays. In the centre is a square porch with a corniced roof. The doorway has a moulded surround, and a semicircular fanlight with a keystone, and the windows are sashes.	II
St Matthew's Church; 53.78543°N 1.55929°W		1829–32	A Commissioners' church, it was designed by R. D. Chantrell, the spire was added in 1860, and the church has been converted into a community centre. It is in gritstone with a slate roof, and consists of a nave, north and south aisles, a chancel, and a west steeple. The steeple has a tower with buttresses, a west doorway, clock faces, corner pinnacles, and a broach spire with lucarnes. Along the sides of the church are lancet windows, and on the corners are pinnacles.	II
Wall and gate piers, St Matthew's Church; 53.78520°N 1.55935°W		1829–32 (probable)	The wall enclosing the west and south sides of the churchyard and the gate piers were designed by R. D. Chantrell, and are in stone. The wall is low, the railings are missing, and the wall extends for about 200 metres (660 ft). The gate piers opposite the west door of the church each has a chamfered plinth, a monolithic shaft, and a gabled capstone.	II
Murray memorial and railings 53.78654°N 1.55937°W		c. 1830	The memorial is in the churchyard of St Matthew's Church, it is to the memory of Matthew Murray and family members, and is over their vault. It consists of an obelisk on a plinth block on a podium, all in iron, on a stone base of four steps. On the plinth block are raised stone panels in iron architraves with inscriptions. The memorial stands in a rectangular enclosure with a low stone wall and iron railings.	II
Churwell Viaduct; 53.76420°N 1.58321°W		1840s	The viaduct was designed by Thomas Grainger for the Leeds, Dewsbury and Manchester Railway, and is about 95 metres (312 ft) long. It is in sandstone, and consists of six segmental arches with voussoirs that are chamfered rusticated and vermiculated. The arches spring from moulded imposts on rectangular piers with plinths and quoins. The bridge has a moulded string course and a coped parapet with railings.	II
Railway underbridge MDL1/39, Churwell Bridge; 53.76190°N 1.57992°W	—	1840s	The bridge was designed by Thomas Grainger for the Leeds, Dewsbury and Manchester Railway, and carries a footpath under the line. It is in sandstone, and consists of a single semicircular arch. The bridge has an impost band, voussoirs, and curving coped wing walls ending in short square piers.	II
Gates, gate piers, and walls, Holbeck Cemetery; 53.77819°N 1.55949°W		Mid 19th century	At the entrance to the cemetery are two pairs of gate piers in gritstone, each about 3 metres (9.8 ft) high, with an octagonal section, a plinth, a moulded cornice, and a stepped conical capstone. The gates are in cast iron and are highly decorated with fleur-de-lys finials. Attached to the gate piers are low walls about 8 metres (26 ft) long, with moulded coping stones and a moulded crest.	II
Lodge, Holbeck Cemetery; 53.77829°N 1.55947°W		Mid 19th century	The lodge by the entrance to the cemetery is in gritstone with a pantile roof. There is one storey and a cruciform plan, with three bays, and steep gables with bargeboards. The doorway is in a pointed arch, and the windows have arched heads.	II
The King's Arms Public House; 53.78707°N 1.55997°W		Mid 19th century	The public house is in painted render with faience tiles, chamfered quoins, a moulded eaves cornice, and a grey slate roof. There are two storeys, the front is gabled with two bays, and there are two bays on the right return. The central doorway has a fanlight, and is flanked by windows with three segmental-headed lights, over which is a fascia with recessed panels, an entablature with the name, and a moulded cornice. In the upper floor are windows in moulded architraves, and the gable is decorated, and contains a blocked round-headed window, and plaques with the name.	II
St Luke's Church; 53.77987°N 1.55610°W		1871–72	A vestry was added later to the church, which is in gritstone, and in Gothic Revival style. It consists of a nave with a clerestory, north and south aisles, a chancel and a vestry. On the west gable is a small gabled bellcote with a niche and pinnacles. In the aisles are paired lancet windows, the clerestory contains round windows above lancets, and the east window has five lights.	II
Marsden Memorial, Holbeck Cemetery; 53.77807°N 1.56011°W		c. 1876	The memorial to Henry Marsden is in stone and marble. There is a high plinth with inscribed panels, at the corners are angels under bell-shaped canopies, and it carries a coat of arms. The statue has a stepped base, and consists of an almost full-size draped figure kneeling before a low desk with a raised hand.	II
St Mary's Church; 53.77313°N 1.56613°W		1877	The older part is the chancel, the nave and aisles were added in 1885–86. The church is in stone with slate roofs, and consists of a nave with a clerestory, north and south aisles, a south porch, a chancel, and a slim south west tower. The tower is square, with an octagonal bell stage and a short spire. In the aisles are small lancet windows, the clerestory windows are round, there is a Perpendicular window in the east end of the south aisle, a rose window in the west gable, and the east window has five lights.	II
1 and 1A Colville Terrace; 53.78131°N 1.55268°W		1880	Originally the caretaker's house for a board school, it is in red brick with details in stone, a sill band, a moulded eaves cornice, and a pyramidal slate roof with a finial. There are two storeys and a square plan with sides of two bays. The doorway has a fanlight, the windows are sashes with segmental heads and keystones, and on the front at eaves level is a ramped brick panel.	II
Former Joseph Priestley College; 53.78097°N 1.55305°W		1880	Originally a board school, later used for other purposes, the building is in red brick with details in stone and a slate roof. There are two storeys and a basement, and a front of 15 bays. In the ground floor are pilasters, and between the floors is a cornice. The outer bays project under pyramidal roofs and each contains a doorway with an architrave, a plaque, and a triangular pediment on consoles. The central block also projects, it has pilasters, a cornice and a segmental pediment, and at the top is a clock and an ornate pedimented gable. The bays between the projecting sections have windows with stone architraves, carved imposts and keystones, those in the ground floor of the left section with round heads, and the others with flat heads.	II
Wall, railings, gates and gate piers, Former Joseph Priestley College; 53.78082°N 1.55270°W	—	1880	Enclosing the forecourt are low brick walls with stone coping extending for about 75 metres (246 ft). They have cast iron railings, the rods with knob finials. Each of the gate piers has a square section, a plinth, a shaft, a moulded cornice, and a stepped pyramidal capstone.	II
Holbeck Mills Carpet Warehouse; 53.78617°N 1.56139°W		1880–81	Originally a church with a Sunday school forming a cross wing at the rear, the building has since been used for other purposes. The body is in brick, and the front in stone. The front has a plinth, and in the centre is a bowed portico with Corinthian columns, and a full entablature surmounted by a balustrade with urn finials. The portico is flanked by narrow bays, then wider bays forming towers with quoins, pilasters, and eaves cornices on consoles. In the tower are round-headed windows, those in the ground floor with pediments. Behind the portico is a pedimented gable.	II
2 Kildare Terrace; 53.79068°N 1.56904°W		1884	Originally the house for a caretaker or teacher at a board school, it is in red brick with details in stone, bands of patterned brickwork at first floor and eaves level, a moulded eaves cornice, and a slate roof with coped gables and kneelers. There are two storeys and an attic, and sides of one and two bays. The doorway has a fanlight, and the windows are sashes.	II
Former Jacob Kramer College; 53.79063°N 1.56847°W		1884	The board school, later used for other purposes, is in red brick with some stone dressings, a moulded eaves cornice, and a slate roof. There are two storeys and a basement, two blocks of three bays with hipped roofs, and lower bays between them and at the ends. The windows have round-heads, those in the ground floor with hood moulds. In the outer bays are doorways with carved lintels and tall traceried fanlights.	II
Wall, gates and gate piers, Former Jacob Kramer College; 53.79021°N 1.56826°W	—	c. 1884	The forecourt of the building is enclosed by a low brick wall with stone coping, and is about 50 metres (160 ft) long. The railings and gates are in cast iron and elaborately decorated. The gate piers each has an octagonal plinth and shaft, a narrow neck, a capstone with a carved flower frieze, and a domed top with a knob finial.	II
St Edward's Vicarage; 53.78346°N 1.56309°W		c. 1904	The vicarage to St Edward's Church, now demolished, and later a private house, was designed by G. F. Bodley. The ground floor is in red brick, the upper parts are roughcast and the roof is tiled with coped gables that are curved at the apices. There are two storeys and four bays. Two of the bays project slightly under gables, and contain sash windows with small cornices. Between the gabled bays is a doorway and window with a hood on shaped brackets, over which is a three-light mullioned and transomed window.	II
