= City Evangelical Church, Leeds =

Coordinates: 53.7807°N 1.5594°W

City Evangelical Church
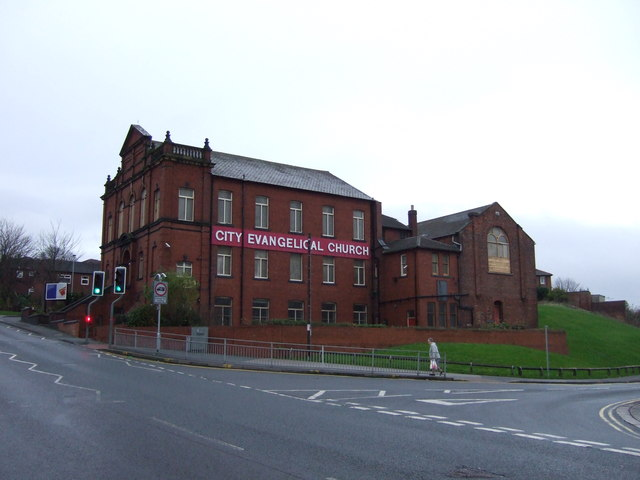
- View from the north

- Shown within West Yorkshire
- OS grid reference: SE 291 317
- Country: England
- Denomination: Evangelical
- Churchmanship: Evangelical
- Website: www.cecleeds.co.uk

History
- Status: Church

Architecture
- Functional status: Active
- Architectural type: Chapel

Clergy
- Pastor: Chris Schofield

City Evangelical Church is an independent evangelical church in Beeston, Leeds, West Yorkshire, England. It is situated on Cemetery Road in the former Beeston Hill Baptist Chapel.

The church is affiliated to the Fellowship of Independent Evangelical Churches.

== History ==
The church was formed in 1957 under the name Cottingley Free Church.

== Location ==
The church is located in Beeston, quite near to Elland Road football stadium and the M621 motorway.
