= White Rose railway station =

Planned railway station in England

White Rose
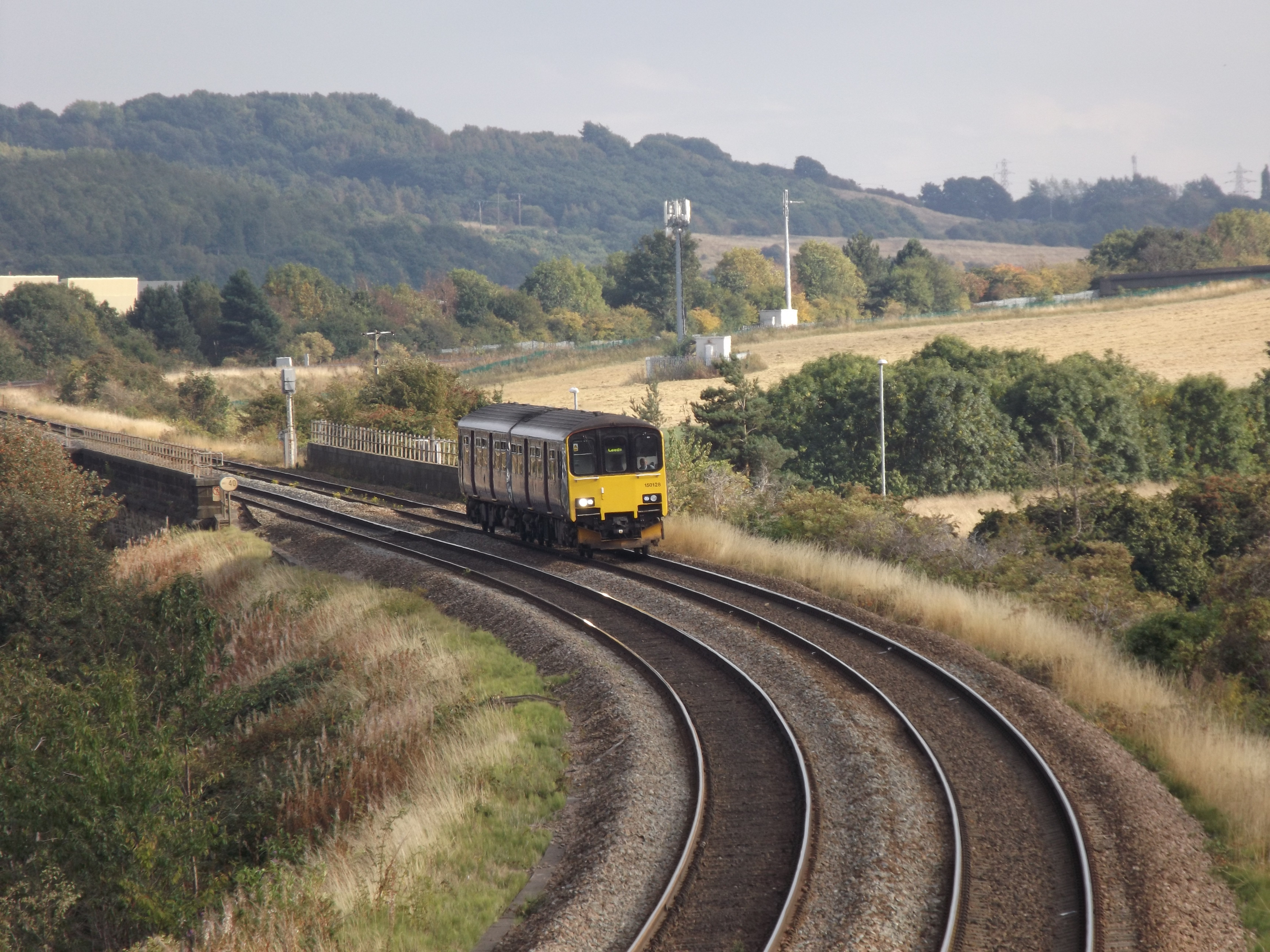
- The planned location of the station is behind the train, in line with the telephone mast

General information
- Location: White Rose Centre, City of Leeds; England
- Coordinates: 53.761°N 1.579°W
- Grid reference: SE278294
- System: Heavy rail
- Manager: Northern (proposed)
- Line: Huddersfield line
- Platforms: 2
- Tracks: 2

Construction
- Structure type: Elevated

History
- Opening: 2027
Location

White Rose is a planned railway station between Cottingley and Morley railway stations on the Huddersfield Line. It was featured in the Government's plans for the railway in November 2017 and in July 2018 further details were revealed as part of the Connecting Leeds Vision with the consultation inviting opinions from the general public. It is anticipated by the developers that Cottingley railway station will close due to the proximity of the two stations.

== History ==
The planned station will serve the White Rose Centre and the Millshaw Business Park, and its location would be 2,460 feet (750 m) south of Cottingley railway station. Leeds City Council are considering whether to retain Cottingley station or to close it when White Rose opens. Speculation about the closure of Cottingley railway station has only been from the community who have pointed out that the station attracts only 265 passengers a day on average.

The station is to be financed from the £173.5 million Department for Transport money that was given to Leeds City Council but left without portfolio when the trolleybus scheme across Leeds was denied permission by Patrick McLoughlin. The funds needed to be used by the financial year 2020–2021.

The station was approved by Leeds City Council in June 2020, with two platforms and a service pattern of two trains per hour in each direction. The developers stated that this will probably lead to the closure of the nearby Cottingley railway station, and whilst this was not initially confirmed by Northern, Leeds City Council or the Department for Transport, confirmation of the station closure came in October 2021. Planning permission was granted in Summer 2021, with the expectation that it could open for December 2022.

Upon completion, each platform would be capable of accepting six carriage trains, with scope to expand the length to accommodate eight car trains. The scheme anticipates a footfall of 340,000 people per year.

=== Construction delays ===
Construction of the new station was expected to be completed in early 2024, with an estimated cost of £26.5 million. However, construction was halted in March 2024 due to increased costs. In August 2024, it was still unclear as to when construction would resume, though by November of the same year, it was announced that work would restart early in 2025, with a view to opening the station later that year, however, on 15th November 2025 construction was still in a "temporary pause".

On 22 January 2026, additional funding of £1.4m was approved by West Yorkshire Combined Authority clearing the way for remobilising construction.

== Services ==
The station is expected to be served by two trains per hour running between Leeds and Dewsbury/Huddersfield.

Preceding station	Future services	Following station
Morley	Northern Trains Huddersfield Line	Leeds
