= Cottingley, Leeds =

Urban area in Leeds, West Yorkshire, England

Coordinates: 53.771°N 1.583°W

Cottingley
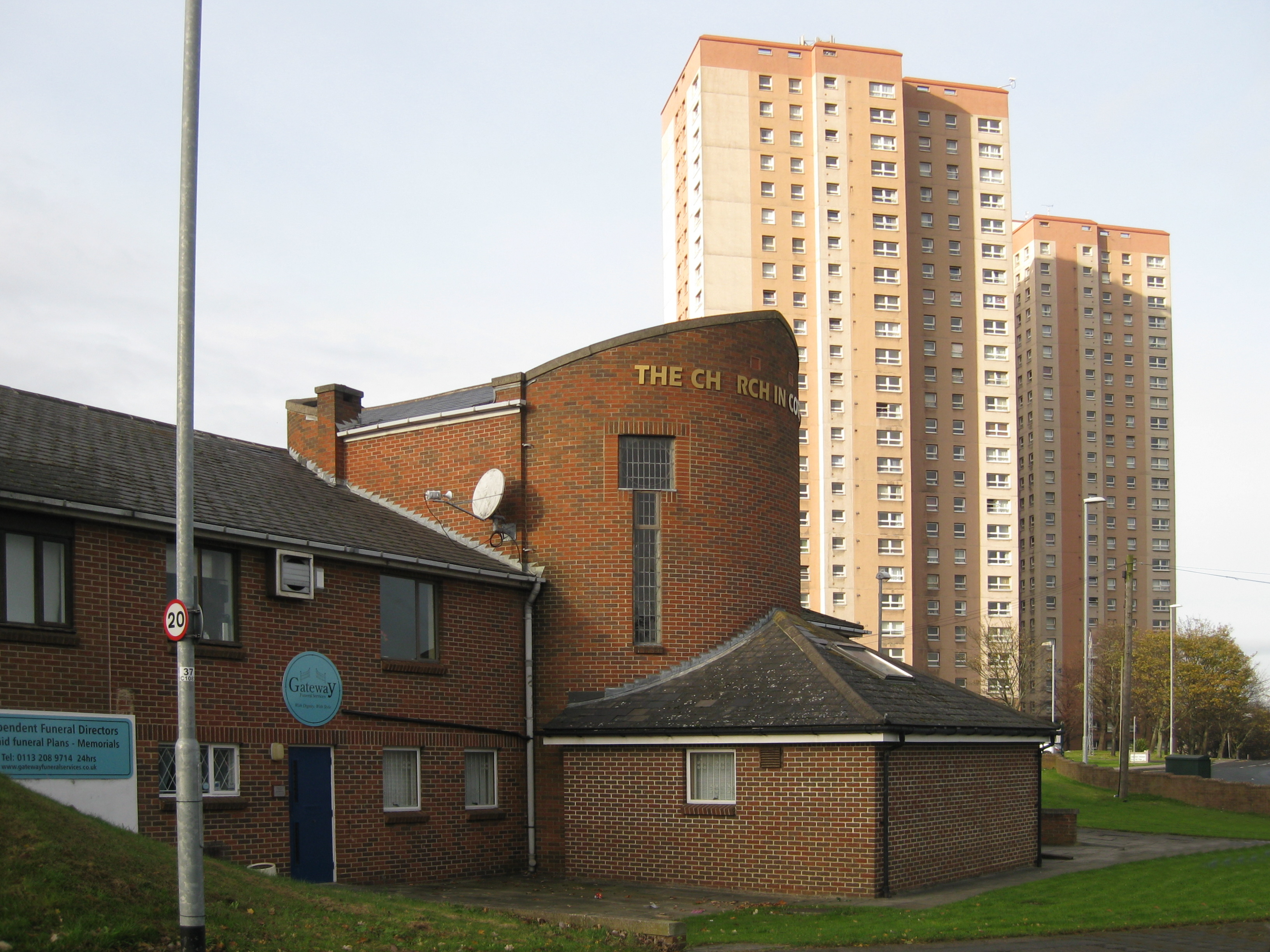
- Church in Cottingley, Cottingley Towers (forward) and Cottingley Heights (rear)

- Location within West Yorkshire
- Metropolitan borough: Leeds
- Metropolitan county: West Yorkshire
- Region: Yorkshire and the Humber
- Country: England
- Sovereign state: United Kingdom
- Police: West Yorkshire
- Fire: West Yorkshire
- Ambulance: Yorkshire

Cottingley is an urban area in the south-west of Leeds, West Yorkshire, England.

Cottingley falls within Beeston and Holbeck ward of the Leeds City Council, and is classed as an area of Beeston. The area includes Cottingley Hall Cemetery and Crematorium, run by the Council.

== Etymology ==
The etymology of Cottingley is uncertain, because the name may be an ancient one, deriving from Old English, or a more recent one.

The name is reliably recorded as a Leeds place-name only from 1538. If the name was given only in the fifteenth or sixteenth century, it was probably named after someone with the surname Cottingley (which in this case would originally have referred to Cottingley, Bradford, which is already attested in the Domesday Book of 1086).

However, there is a record of a place called Cottingle from 1226 which may refer to the Leeds Cottingley rather than the Bradford one. If the Leeds name is indeed this old, it probably does derive independently from the same Old English words as its Bradford counterpart. If so, the first element is the personal name Cotta (the origin of which is unknown), and the second the suffix -ingas denoting a group of associated people. Thus the Cottingas were a group descended from or otherwise associated with someone called Cotta. This group name was then compounded with the Old English word lēah ('open land in a wood'). Thus the name once meant 'the clearing of the descendants of Cola'.

== Cottingley Hall Estate ==
Most of Cottingley is a council estate. The Cottingley Hall estate was built in the 1970s, replacing an estate of temporary prefabricated housing that had previously been on the site. The estate was built on 'New Town Principles' (similar to Bransholme in Kingston upon Hull), the estate is set around a series of cul de sacs, segregating large volumes of traffic from housing and pedestrians. This method of building has often been criticised as creating a 'rabbit warren', impractical for the local police. Although on larger estates of similar style this causes a problem, the effects on Cottingley have been minimal.

The two tower blocks (Cottingley Towers and Cottingley Heights) situated on a hill at the centre of the estate were at the time Leeds's tallest flats. They were built in 1972 and refurbished in 1989.

== Amenities ==
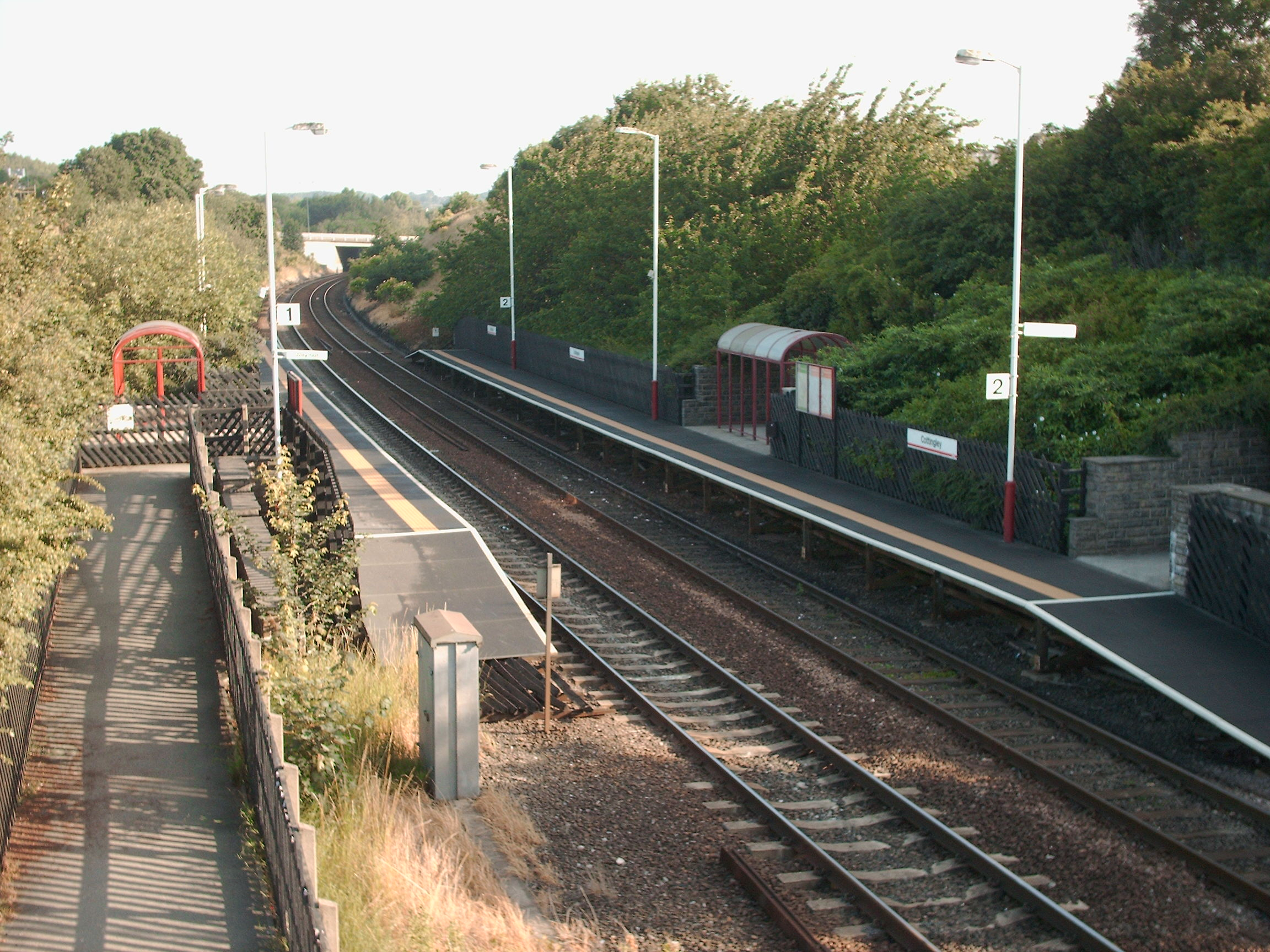
Cottingley railway station

Cottingley railway station serves the area. It is situated on the Leeds to Huddersfield line and was opened in 1988. The Church in Cottingley is a Methodist one, part of a building which is also a community centre. The local school is Cottingley Primary Academy. Adjacent to the cemetery is Junction 1 Retail Park which includes a B&Q warehouse, a Burger King, a B&M store, The Food Warehouse and A Paw Prints pet shop which all three opened in 2019. The Aldi supermarket and Maplins closed down in June 2018. There is a small precinct on the estate, this did have a pub, the Cottingley Arms but this has been closed a number of years. There are a small number of shops in the precinct. The White Rose Shopping Centre is a short walk away.

== Gallery ==
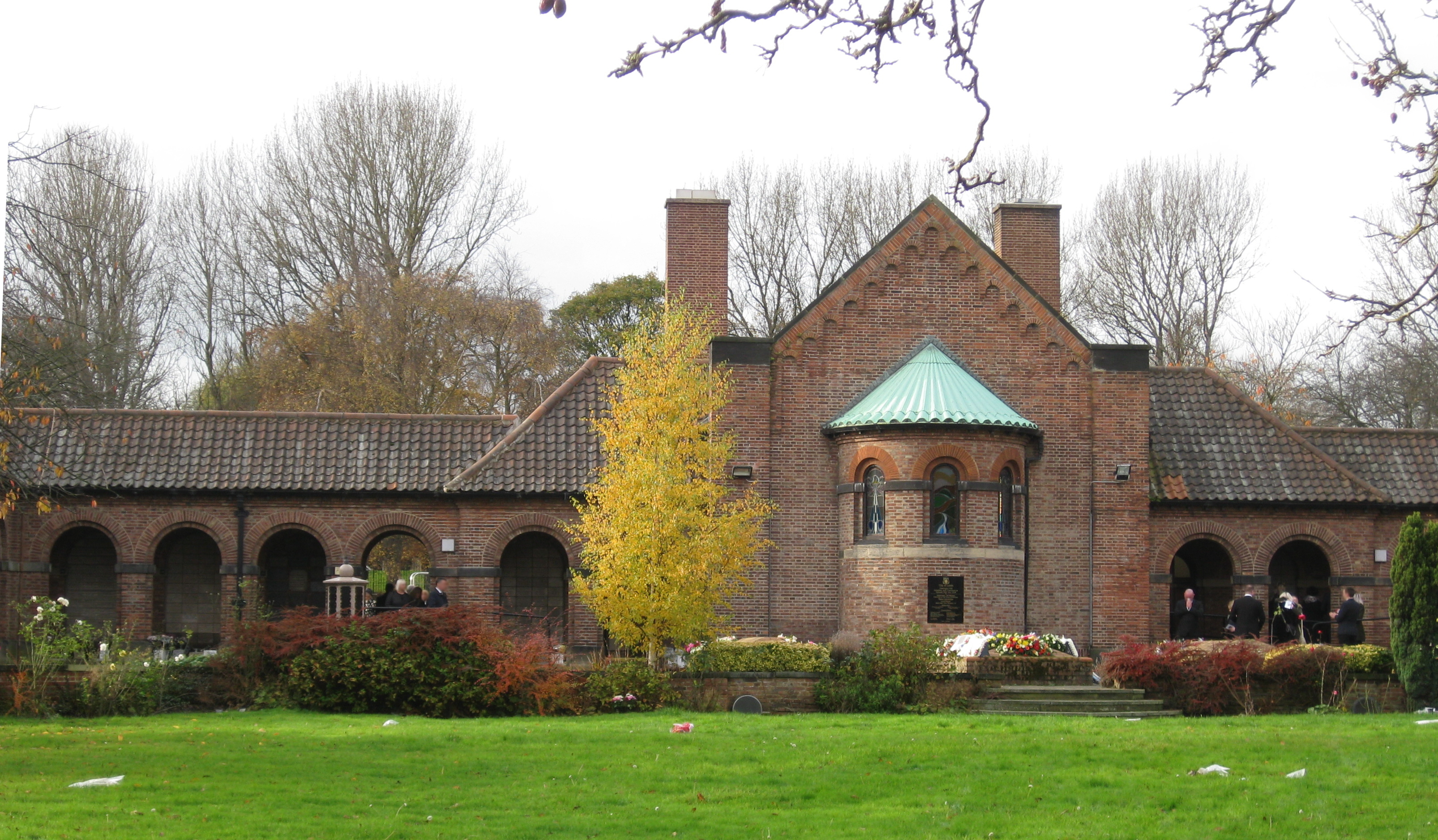
The Chapel in Cottingley Hall Cemetery

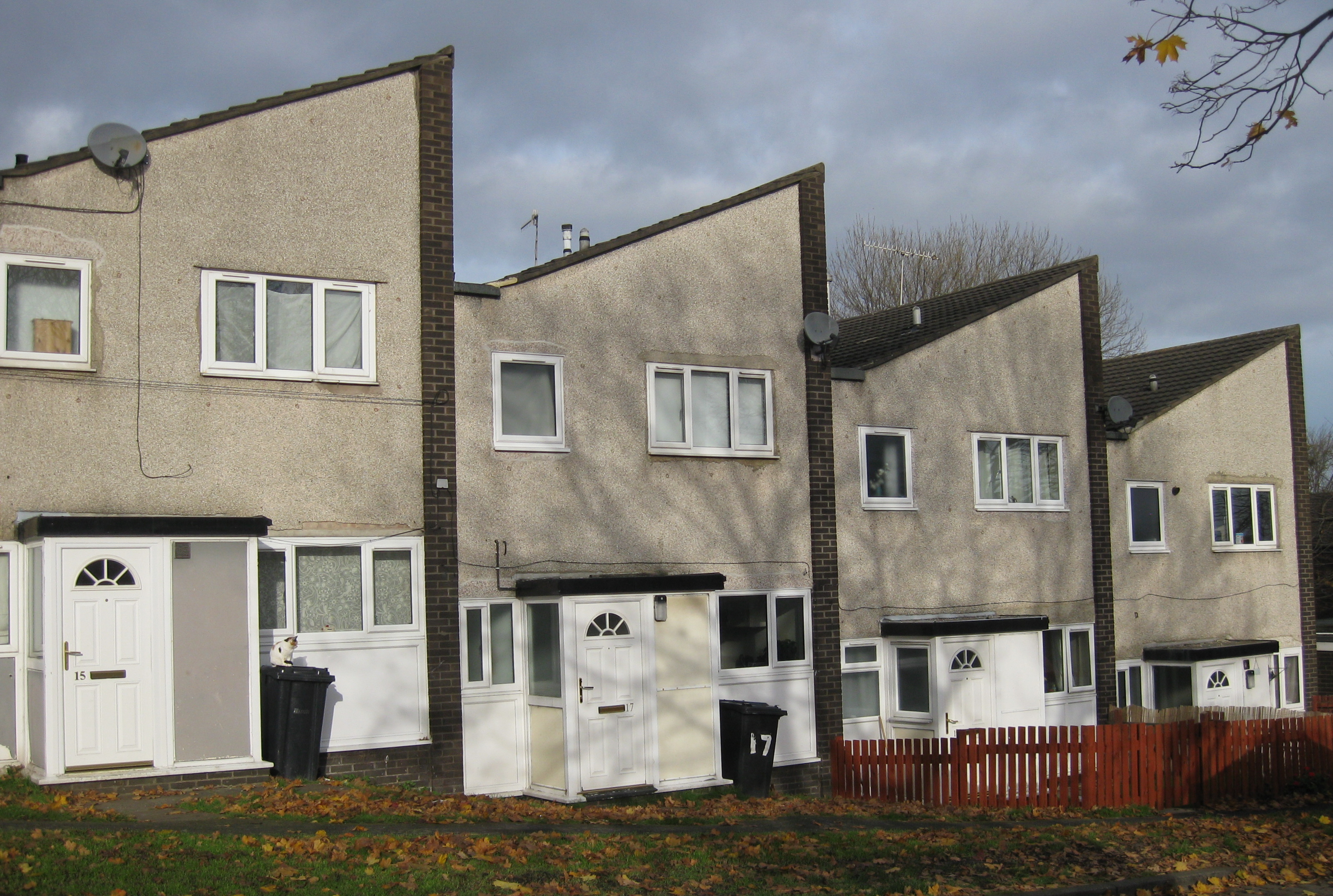
Houses in Cottingley Hall Estate
