= Cottingley railway station =

Railway station in West Yorkshire, England

Cottingley
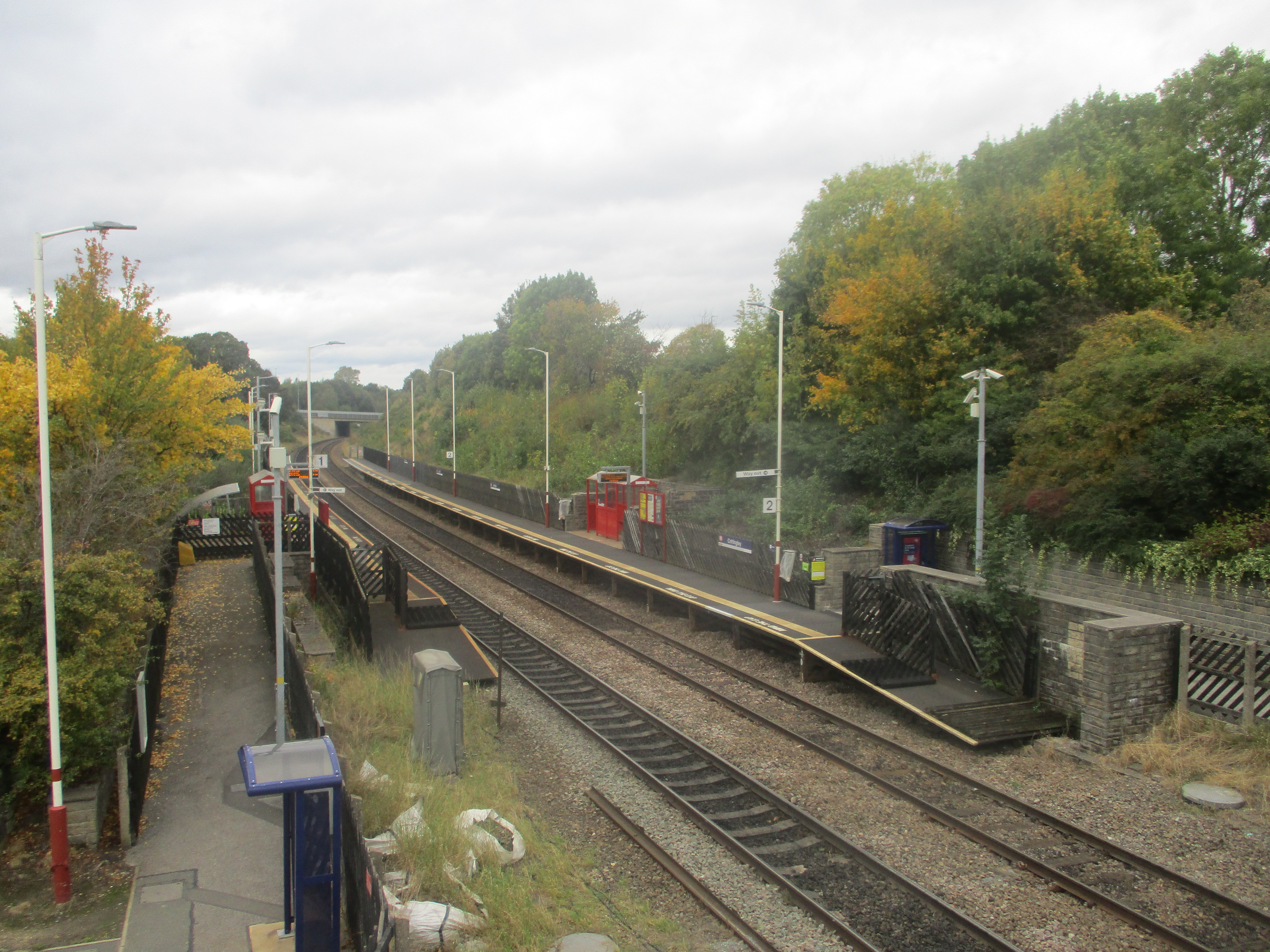
- The view from the foot bridge

General information
- Location: Cottingley, City of Leeds; England
- Coordinates: 53.7679°N 1.5876°W
- Grid reference: SE272302
- Manager: Northern Trains
- Transit authority: West Yorkshire Metro
- Platforms: 2

Other information
- Station code: COT
- Fare zone: 2
- Classification: DfT category F2

History
- Original company: British Rail

Key dates
- 25 April 1988: Station opened

Passengers
- 2021/22: ▲51,756
- 2022/23: ▲61,416
- 2023/24: ▼57,294
- 2024/25: ▼52,858
- 2025/26: ▲63,680
Location
Notes
- Passenger statistics from the Office of Rail and Road

Cottingley railway station serves the Cottingley and Churwell areas of Leeds, West Yorkshire, England. It lies 3 miles (5 km) south west of Leeds on the Huddersfield Line. It is the nearest railway station to Leeds United F.C.'s Elland Road stadium.

White Rose railway station is planned 820 yards (750 m) south of Cottingley station, and is currently under construction, and following a review, West Yorkshire Combined Authority has decided that Cottingley station will subsequently close on the grounds of its inaccessibility and that White Rose station will be better connected to businesses and places of education.

== History ==
The station was opened by British Rail on 25 April 1988 with financial assistance from West Yorkshire Passenger Transport Executive and is currently managed by Northern Trains; however, most trains that call at Cottingley are now operated by TransPennine Express apart from three peak hour services. This will change from the December 2024 Timetable change when Northern Trains will operate the local stopping services jointly with TransPennine Express.

Following the approval of plans for a new White Rose railway station 770 yards (700 m) to the south. Cottingley Station was set to close in 2023, but still remains open in 2026 owing to the problems encountered at White Rose railway station. The decision was originally made due to the station's poor accessibility and the improved location for the new station.

== Patronage growth ==
Patronage at Cottingley station (off Cottingley Drive) has increased significantly in recent years, and this is reflected by the figures published by the Office of the Rail Regulator (ORR). Recorded usage in 2002/03 was 9,467 journeys per year (average of entries and exits).

By 2005/06, this had increased to 73,894 journeys per year, an increase of 781% (almost eightfold) in four years. Actual growth may be higher, since the ORR data does not accurately take account of the multi-modal 'MetroCard' season tickets issued by WYPTE which are valid for journeys to and from this station. From 2008/9, such MetroCard data are included, but only an estimation is made.

Recent growth can also be attributed in part by a significant new housing development adjacent to the railway station, called Churwell New Village.

That, combined with growth elsewhere on the line, means that overcrowding in the morning peak for commuters heading towards Leeds is now a serious problem. Efforts to address this have been hampered by the relatively short platforms at the station, which limited the length of trains that can call here. The platforms have since been extended (towards Leeds) and can now accommodate three car trains easily. Network Rail further extended the platforms in November/December 2018.

== Facilities ==
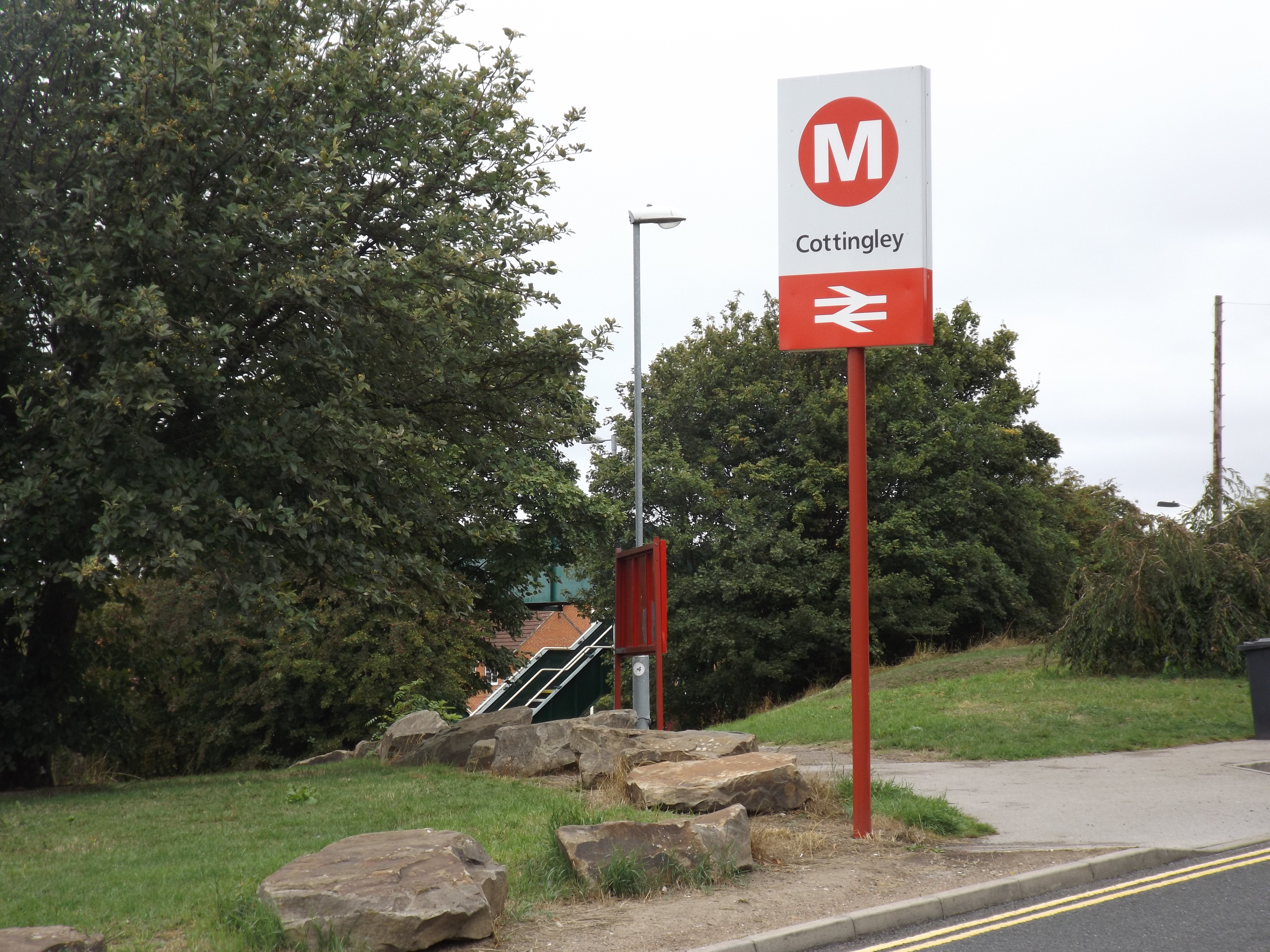
Signage at the entrance to Cottingley railway station

The station is unstaffed and has only basic shelters on each platform. Platform 1 is the ‘down’ platform for trains to Leeds and platform 2 is the ‘up’ platform for trains to Dewsbury, Huddersfield, Brighouse and Manchester.

There are ticket machines on both sides. Automatic announcements, timetable posters and dot matrix display screens provide train running information.

Step-free access is available to both platforms; however they are linked by a stepped footbridge.

== Services ==
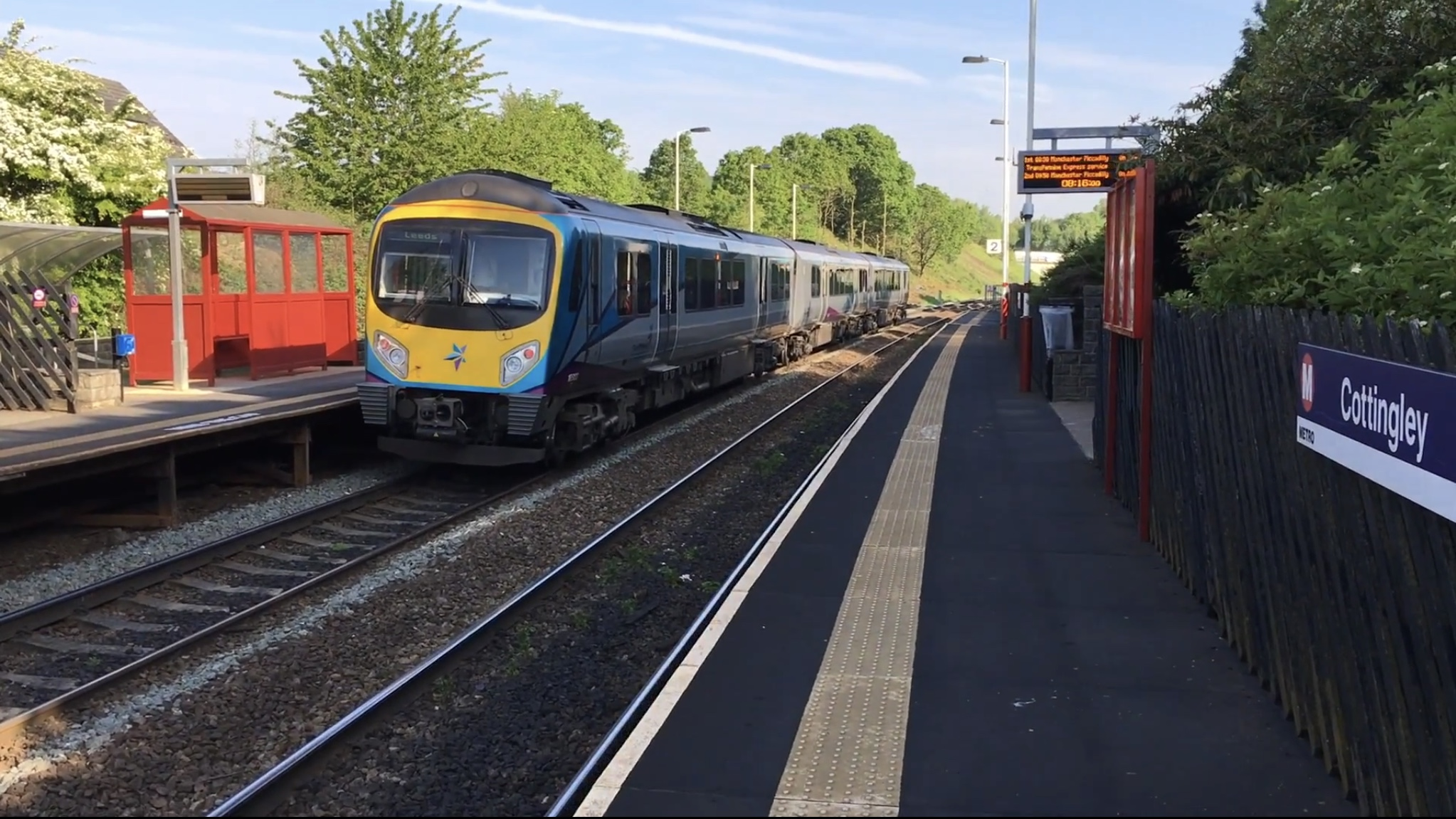
A TransPennine Express service at Cottingley in 2018

As of December 2020, from Monday to Friday and on Saturdays, there is an hourly service from Cottingley to Leeds and to Huddersfield calling at all intermediate stations. Two early morning services and one evening peak service are operated by Northern, with the remainder operated by TransPennine Express. The service on a Sunday is similar but starts later.

Preceding station	National Rail	Following station
Morley	Northern Trains; Calder Valley Line (Southport – Leeds)	Leeds
Morley	TransPennine Express; Huddersfield line (Huddersfield – Leeds)	Leeds

== Scheduled closure ==
The scheduled opening of the White Rose railway station would, if Cottingley railway station was to remain, mean that there would be two stations within half a mile. As a result, a decision to close Cottingley was taken owing to the perceived advantages of the location of White Rose Station over Cottingley. The proposed White Rose station will primarily serve commercial premises in the form of the White Rose Business Park and the White Rose Shopping Centre, whereas Cottingley station chiefly served residential areas in Cottingley and Churwell. It is proposed to retain the footbridge to keep a right of way between the Cottingley Estate and the new housing developments in Churwell.

The Office of Road and Rail in February 2023 ratified the future closure of the station.
