= White Rose Centre =

Shopping mall in West Yorkshire, England

Coordinates: 53°45′27″N 1°34′27″W

White Rose Shopping Centre

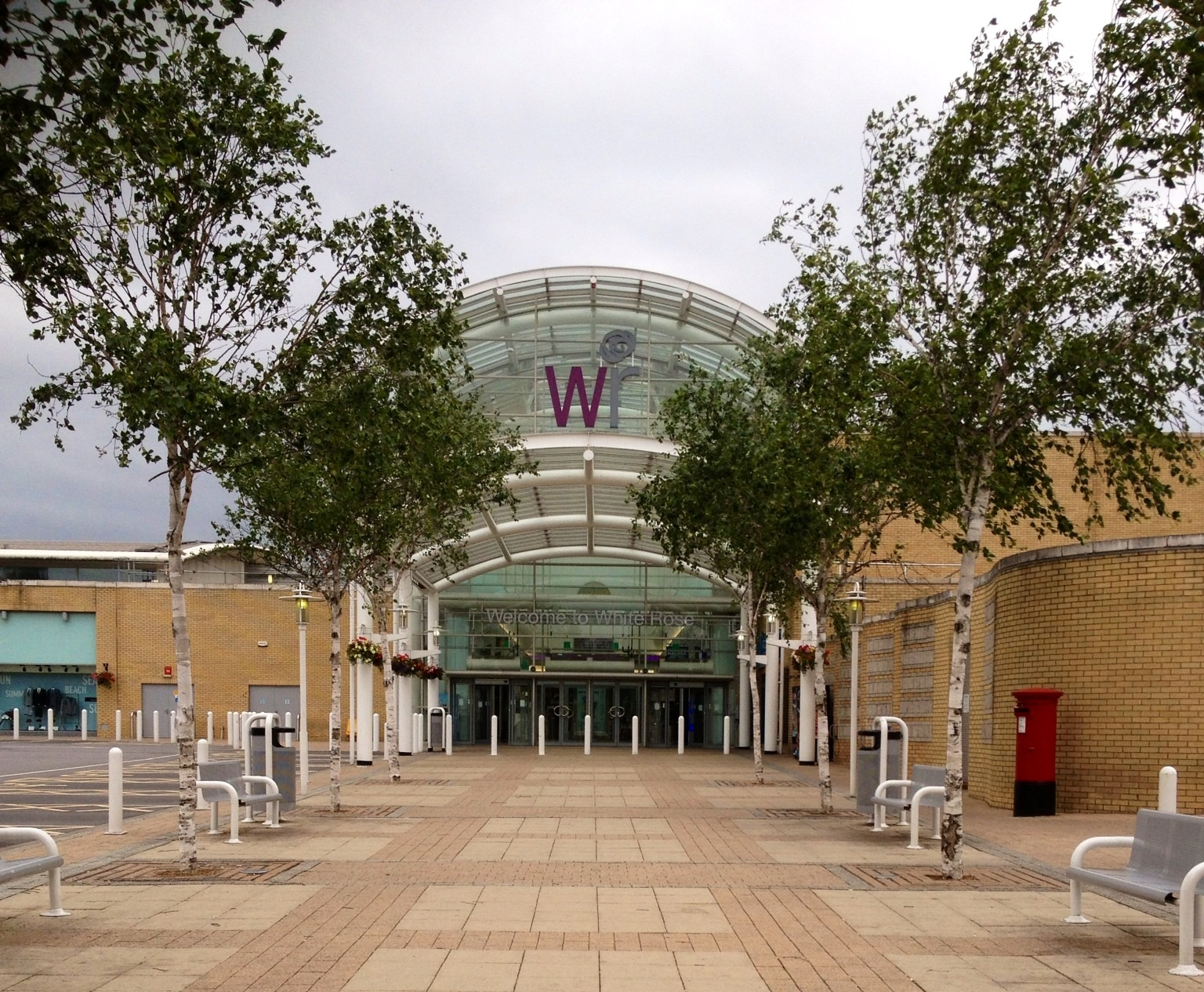
- One White Rose Centre Entrance
- Location: Dewsbury Road, Beeston, Leeds, West Yorkshire, England. LS11 8LU
- Opened: 25 March 1997; 29 years ago
- Owner: Land Securities
- Num. of stores: 124
- Num. of anchor tenants: 2 Marks & Spencer, Sainsbury's
- Floor area: 765,000 sq ft (71,100 m^{2})
- Floors: 2
- Website: white-rose.co.uk

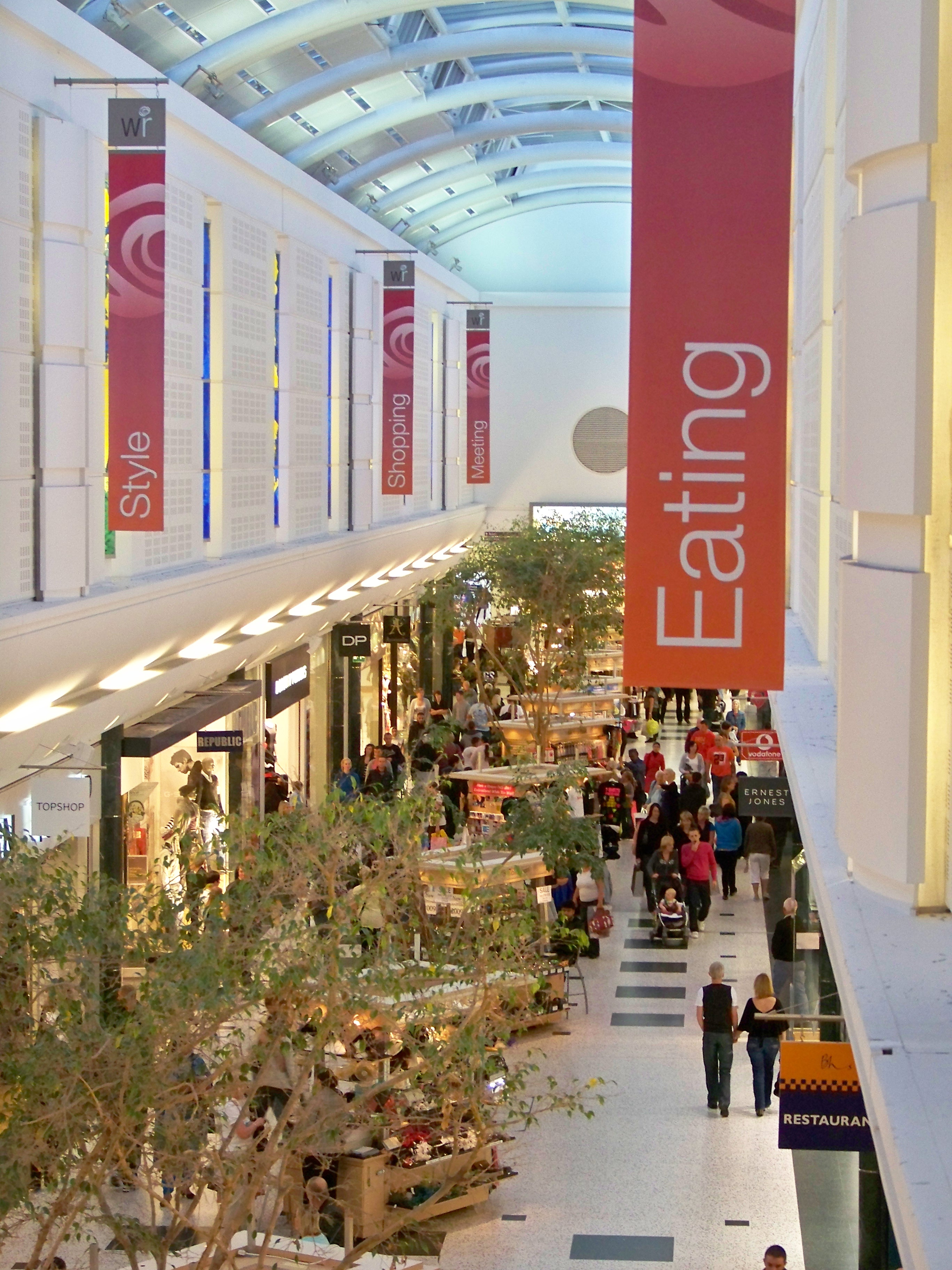
Looking down onto the ground floor

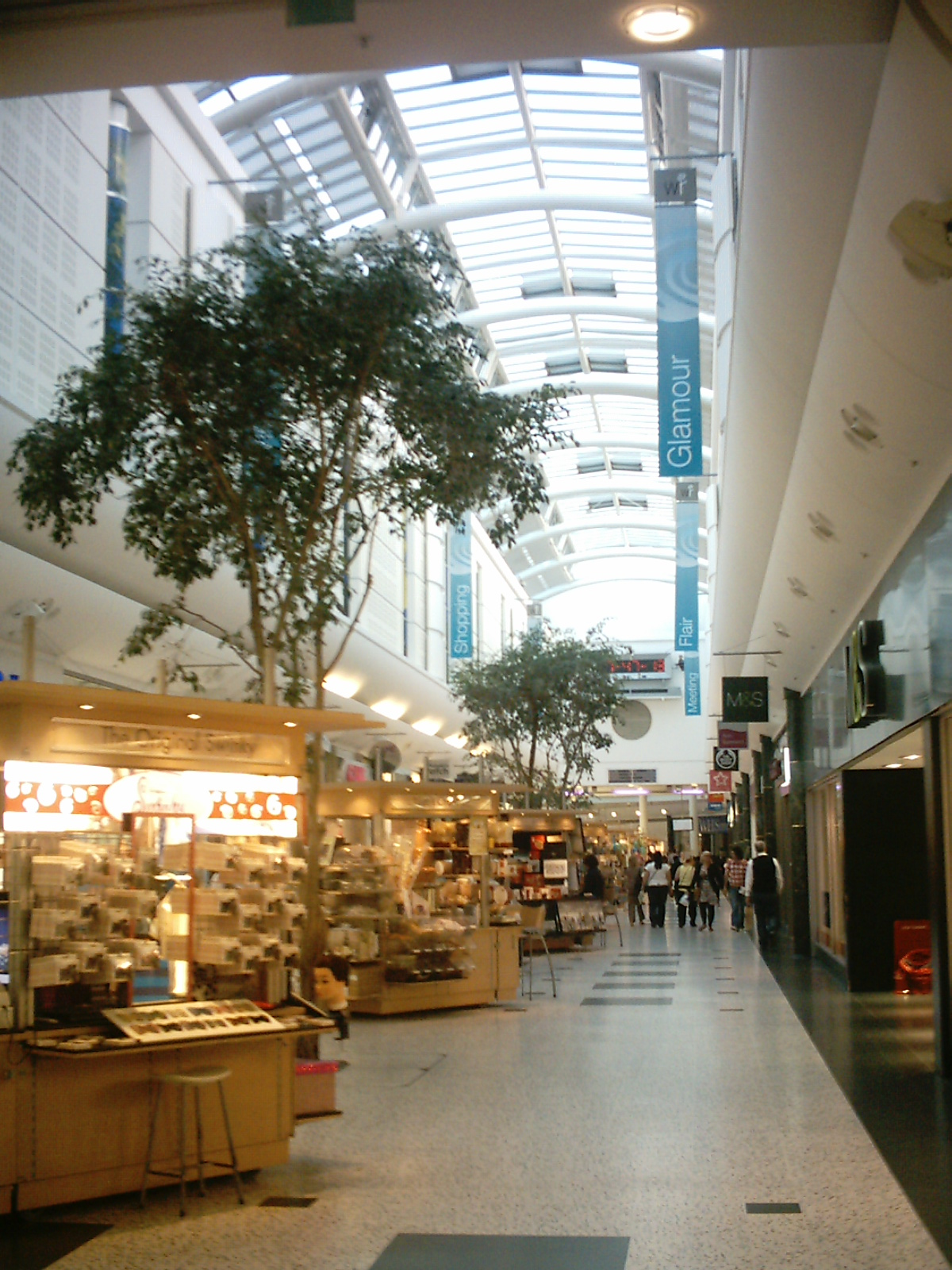
Ground floor in the White Rose Centre

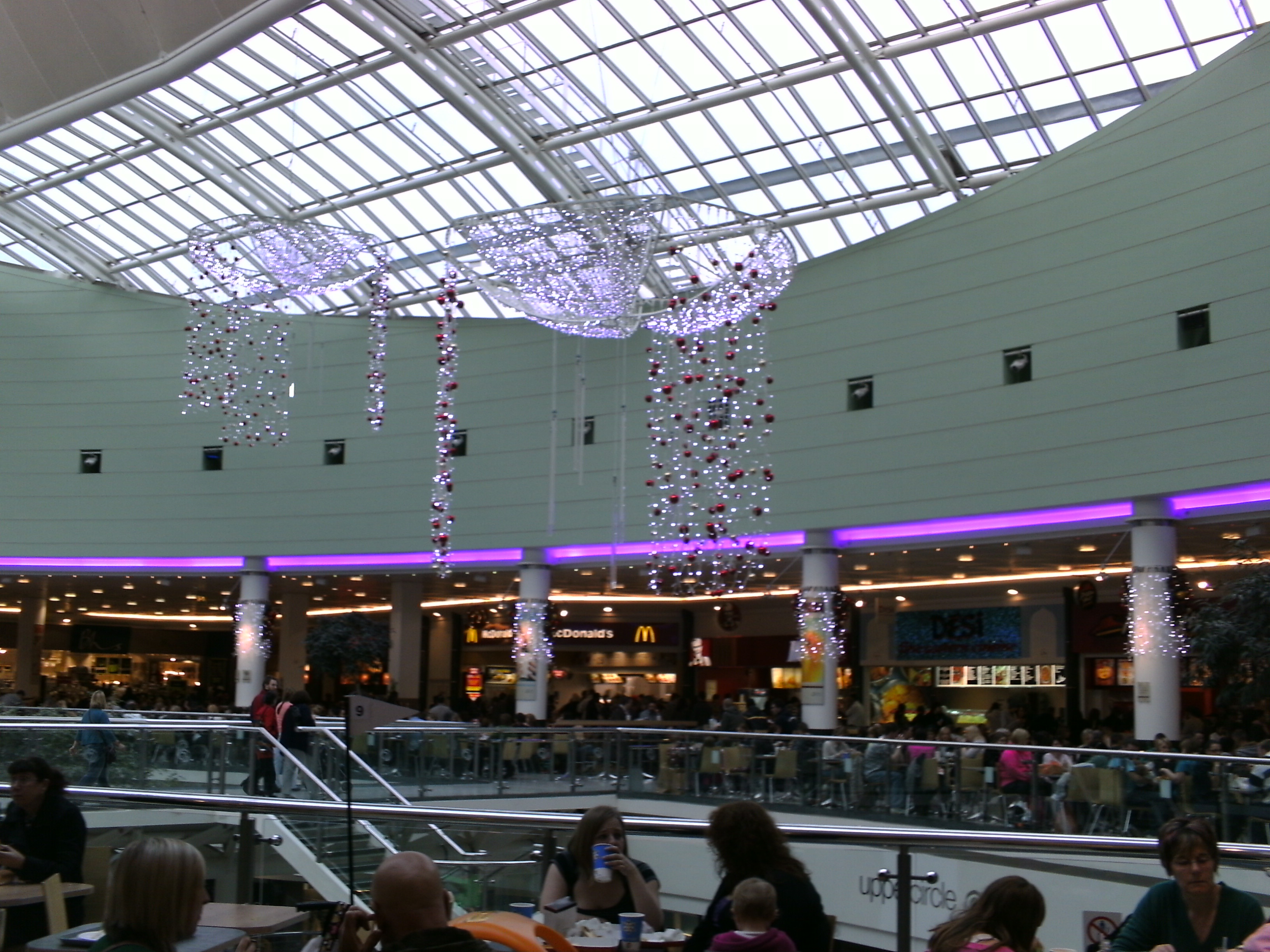
The Upper Circle Food Court

The White Rose Centre is a shopping centre in the Beeston area of Leeds, West Yorkshire, England. It spans two floors and is near the M621 motorway. It takes its name from the White Rose of York, the traditional symbol of Yorkshire.

The centre opened on 25 March 1997 and accommodated major tenants along with over 100 other stores and services, along with multiple eateries.

The south part of the centre was re-developed in 2005 downsizing the Sainsbury's Savacentre to a regular Sainsbury's which made space for other units. Argos was moved into Sainsbury's in 2018.

The centre has a bus station at the north end of the mall connecting it to suburban areas of Leeds and to the city centre. The centre has won awards including a British Council of Shopping Centres (BCSC) Gold Award, BCSC Purple apple, and Green apple awards.

In 2020, during the COVID-19 pandemic in the United Kingdom, the centre suffered the loss of two of its major tenants and most popular stores.

== Construction ==
The site covers 76 acres (310,000 m^{2}) and was formerly the Morley Sewage works. Before building work began in 1995, enabling works including removing the sewage works, sealing disused mine shafts, removing contaminated soil and profiling the sloping site, were carried out. It required moving 750,000 cubic metres of soil to grade a 30-metre fall across the site and create level terraces for the structure and car parks.

Work commenced on the 87-week project on 10 July 1995 and by September the first steelwork was visible. 600 semi-mature, seven-metre-high (23-foot) trees were purchased from Germany and planted in the car park to provide landscaping. Five thousand trees and shrubs have been planted around the car parks and perimeter roads.

== Dining ==
The Balcony Food Court takes up most of the upper floor in the central atrium. It includes McDonald's, KFC, Subway, Spud-u-like, Bagel Factory (previously Bagel Nash), Juice, Nando's, Frankie & Benny's and Pizza Express plus a number of other food outlets

In 2015 the White Rose extended the entrance to the upper level between car park 4 and 5 which created 3 new restaurants which have changed since opening.

The Balcony leads to a newly constructed area of the centre known as The Village. This includes further eateries namely Pizza Hut, Five Guys, Limeyard, Wagamama, Chiquito and TGI Fridays.

== Entertainment ==
An 11-screen IMAX Cineworld cinema opened in 2017. The Escapologist escape room opened in 2019. King Pins bowling complex with karaoke and pool opened in 2025, and Volcano Falls Adventure Golf opened in 2026.

== Community ==
The White Rose Centre is involved in a number of social welfare activities in the local area. Older people are able to participate in mall walking within the covered environment. It houses the White Rose Learning Centre run in conjunction with Education Leeds and Leeds City College to provide dance classes and other educational activities for children at risk of exclusion from school in an informal environment. The Quiet Room in the Upper Circle is available for use by all patrons and staff during the Centre opening hours.

== Criticism ==
Criticism has been levelled at the lack of a railway station, despite the centre's proximity to the Huddersfield and Wakefield railway lines. Plans to add a station have been developed and the go ahead to begin construction was expected in 2022. White Rose railway station is now expected to open in 2026.

== Past and future expansion ==
In 2015 the White Rose extended the entrance to the upper level between car park 4 and 5 which created 3 new restaurants as well leading to the balcony and a new entrance to what would later be incorporated into 'The Village'.

In 2017 a 65,000 square feet (6,000 m^{2}) £25 million extension was completed and named 'The Village'. It included an 11-screen IMAX Cineworld Cinema, a number of new restaurants including; Pizza Hut, Chiquito, Wagamama, Five Guys, Limeyard and TGI Fridays. A children's outdoor play area opened in 'The Village' in 2018.

== McDonald's sign ==
In March 2025, the shopping centre gained media attention when Steve Lovell posted on social media about the centre of the 'D' in the McDonald's sign being missing. He proceeded to take measurements and print a replacement on his 3D printer before replacing the missing part of the 'D'. The centre of the 'O' also broke away which Lovell also replaced. Lovell was then awarded 'Employee of the Month' for his efforts by the White Rose Centre.
