= Greater Lincolnshire Combined County Authority =

Strategic authority and combined county authority in England

- Logo

Type
- Type: Combined county authority of Lincolnshire

History
- Founded: 5 February 2025

Leadership
- Mayor: Andrea Jenkyns, Reform UK since 6 May 2025

Structure
- Graph of the party split among 7 seats.

Elections
- Voting system: Directly elected mayor
- Last election: 1 May 2025
- Next election: 3 May 2029

Meeting place
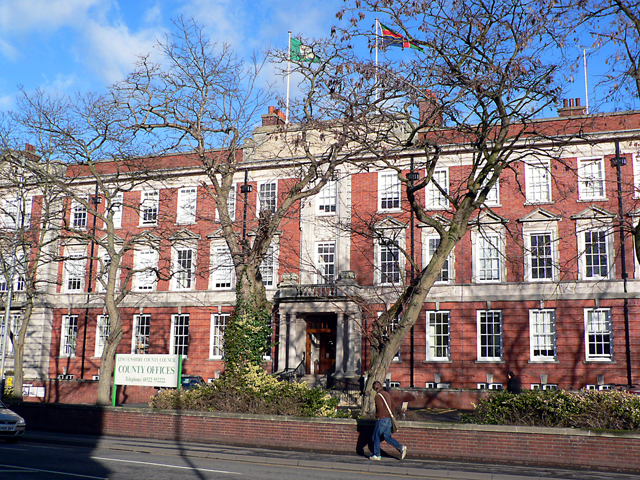
- County Offices, Newland, Lincoln, LN1 1YL

Website
- www.greaterlincolnshire-cca.gov.uk

The Greater Lincolnshire Combined County Authority (GLCCA) is a combined county authority for the ceremonial county of Lincolnshire. It comprises the three upper-tier local authorities in Lincolnshire: Lincolnshire County Council, North East Lincolnshire Council, and North Lincolnshire Council. The board of the authority consists of the elected mayor of Greater Lincolnshire, two members from each constituent local authority, and up to six non-constituent or associate members.

== History ==
An earlier plan for a Lincolnshire devolution was proposed, which would have included all constituent boroughs as well as the county council, failed in 2016 after it was rejected by South Kesteven District Council and Lincolnshire County Council with the main issue being primarily over the condition in the deal of having to accept a directly elected mayor in a rural area that lacks the urban development that is more typically associated with having directly elected mayors.

Following this outcome a new Greater Lincolnshire devolution deal was announced on 13 November 2023 but without the involvement of any the constituent boroughs. The deal proposes to devolve certain powers, i.e. housing, transport, education and skills as well as environmental matters to GLCCA. The consultation by the constituent councils received significant support in favour of the GLCCA.

As well as increased local decision-making, the deal includes an extra £24 million in funding per year transferred from the UK government over the next 30 years, the budget to be overseen by a directly elected mayor.

The three local authorities involved agreed to the deal in March 2024, awaiting the decision of the Secretary of State for Housing, Communities and Local Government and consequent secondary legislation. In May the decision was delayed until after the 2024 UK general election in July. Following the election, the new Labour government agreed to proceed with the devolution deal on 21 September 2024. Draft statutory instruments to establish the combined authority were laid before parliament on 26 November 2024 and came into effect on 5 February 2025.

The first Mayor of Greater Lincolnshire was elected in May 2025. The mayor will be a member of the Mayoral Council for England and the Council of the Nations and Regions.

== Membership ==
The combined authority board is made up of the directly elected Mayor of Greater Lincolnshire, two members from each of the constituent authorities and up to six non-constituent and associate members. As of June 2026, the members are:

Name	Membership	Nominating authority
Andrea Jenkyns	Mayor of Greater Lincolnshire	Direct election
Sean Matthews	Constituent	Lincolnshire County Council
Ingrid Sheard	Constituent	Lincolnshire County Council
Oliver Freeston	Constituent	North East Lincolnshire Council
Samuel Grice	Constituent	North East Lincolnshire Council
Rob Waltham	Constituent	North Lincolnshire Council
Neil Poole	Constituent	North Lincolnshire Council
