= Andrea Jenkyns =

Mayor of Greater Lincolnshire since 2025

Dame Andrea Jenkyns DBE
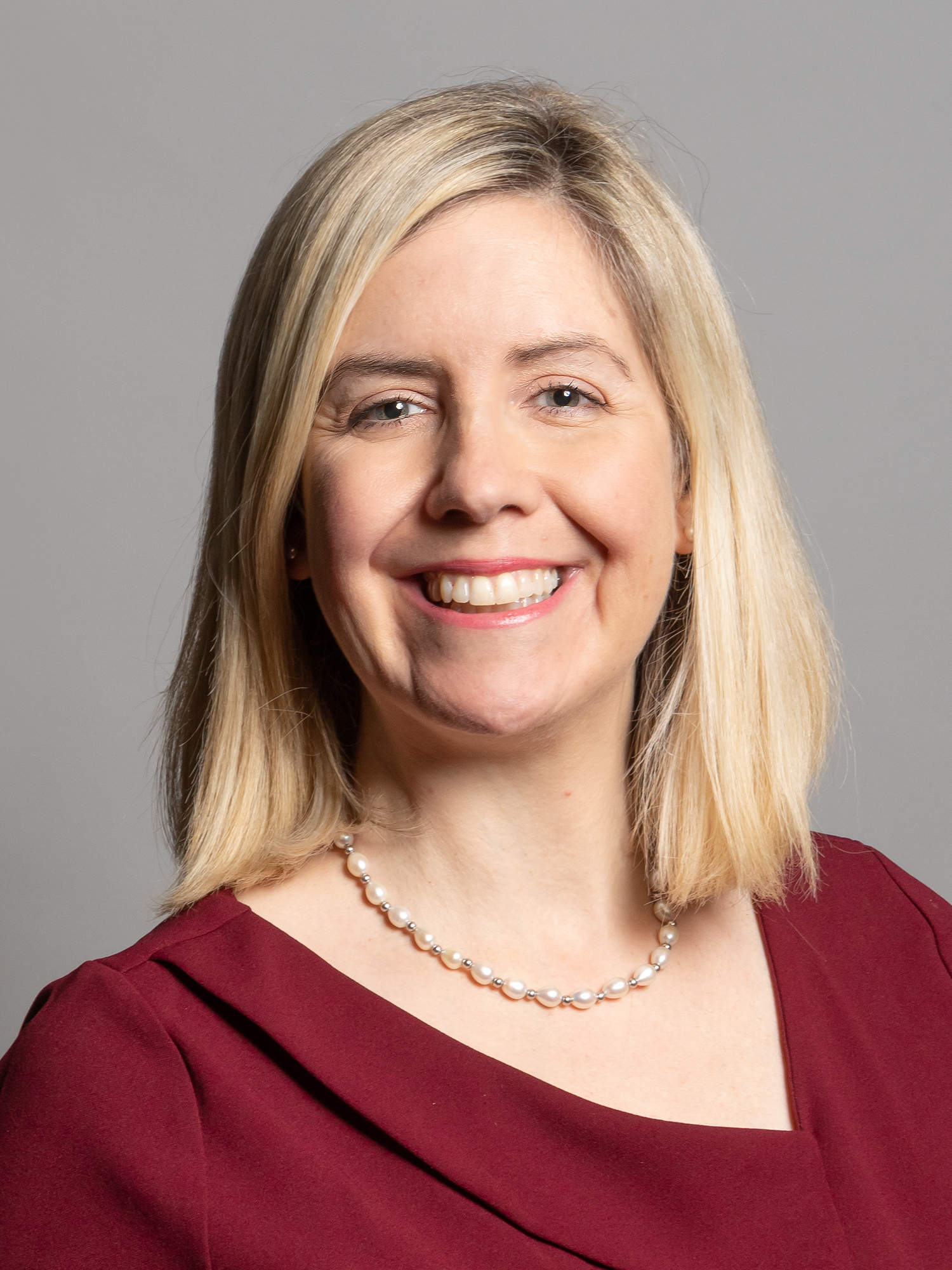
- Official portrait, 2020

Mayor of Greater Lincolnshire
- Incumbent
- Assumed office 6 May 2025
- Preceded by: Office established

Parliamentary Under-Secretary of State for Skills (Note: Parliamentary Under-Secretary of State for Skills, Further and Higher Education July to September 2022.)
- In office 9 July 2022 – 25 October 2022
- Prime Minister: Boris Johnson; Liz Truss
- Preceded by: Michelle Donelan (Note: As Minister of State for Higher and Further Education. She assumed responsibilities for Skills from Alex Burghart.)
- Succeeded by: Robert Halfon

Assistant Government Whip
- In office 20 September 2021 – 8 July 2022
- Prime Minister: Boris Johnson
- Preceded by: Maria Caulfield
- Succeeded by: Julie Marson

Member of Parliament for Morley and Outwood
- In office 7 May 2015 – 30 May 2024
- Preceded by: Ed Balls
- Succeeded by: Constituency abolished

Member of Lincolnshire County Council for Boston North West
- In office 4 June 2009 – 2 May 2013
- Preceded by: Andrew Bakewell
- Succeeded by: Tiggs Keywood-Wainwright

Personal details
- Born: Andrea Marie Jenkyns; 16 June 1974 (age 52) Beverley, Humberside, England
- Party: Reform UK (from 2024)
- Other political affiliations: Conservative (until 2024)
- Spouse: Jack Lopresti (m. 2017; div. 2023)
- Children: 1
- Education: Matthew Humberstone School
- Alma mater: University of Lincoln (BA); Open University (DipHE)
- Occupation: Politician
- Website: Official website

Dame Andrea Marie Jenkyns (born 16 June 1974) is a British politician who has been the Mayor for Greater Lincolnshire since May 2025. A member of the Reform UK party, she was previously the Conservative Party Member of Parliament for Morley and Outwood in West Yorkshire, England from 2015 to May 2024.

Jenkyns was first elected as the Member of Parliament for Morley and Outwood at the 2015 general election, defeating Shadow Chancellor Ed Balls. She was an advocate for the Eurosceptic organisation Leave Means Leave and a strong critic of Theresa May's handling of Brexit during her leadership of the Conservative Party. Jenkyns served as Parliamentary Under-Secretary of State for Skills from July to October 2022, as part of the governments of Boris Johnson and Liz Truss. She was later dismissed by the following Prime Minister, Rishi Sunak. She failed to win re-election to the successor seat of Leeds South West and Morley at the 2024 general election.

Jenkyns was appointed a Dame Commander of the Order of the British Empire in 2023 in the Resignation Honours List of former UK Prime Minister Boris Johnson.

She left the Conservative Party for Reform UK in November 2024, announcing her candidacy for Reform in the 2025 election for the newly created Mayor of Greater Lincolnshire.

In August 2025, Jenkyns was chosen by Nigel Farage to be part of Reform UK's decision-making board.

== Early life and education ==
Jenkyns was born on 16 June 1974 in Beverley, Humberside, and moved to Lincolnshire aged seven. She attended primary school in New Holland and later Matthew Humberstone School in Cleethorpes.

She left school at 16, initially holding a Saturday job at Greggs, before spending around eighteen years in retail and progressing to senior management roles. She also worked in sales and as a music tutor.

As a mature student she completed a diploma with the Open University, followed by a degree in international relations at the University of Lincoln. Outside politics she is a trained soprano and recorded a pop album in 2006; as a teenager she also reached the final of Miss United Kingdom.

== Parliamentary career ==
Following an open primary in 2013, Jenkyns was selected to contest the Morley and Outwood parliamentary seat as the Conservative candidate. In the 2015 general election, she was elected with a slim majority of 422 votes, unseating then-Shadow Chancellor of the Exchequer Ed Balls of the Labour Party. From July 2015, she sat on the Health Select Committee.

Jenkyns supported Brexit in the 2016 EU membership referendum and was a member of the Exiting the European Union Select Committee from 2016 to 2019. Jenkyns stated that she was willing to vote against the government if it brought forward to the House of Commons the Chequers plan on Brexit.

In the 2017 general election, Jenkyns increased her vote share by 11.8%, though only increased her majority to 2,104 as Labour's vote share also increased. Both were helped by the lack of a UKIP candidate in her constituency.

Jenkyns is a Trustee and the voluntary Regional Representative for the charity MRSA Action UK, having joined following the death of her father from MRSA.

In May 2018, Jenkyns quit her role as a PPS in the Ministry of Housing, Communities and Local Government in order to focus on fighting for Brexit. In July 2018, after David Davis resigned from the Cabinet, Jenkyns called for the Prime Minister Theresa May to be replaced, saying: "Theresa May's premiership is over." Jenkyns called on May to return to her Lancaster House speech, stating "Prime Ministers keep their jobs when they keep their promises".

She submitted a formal letter to the 1922 Committee requesting a vote of no confidence in Theresa May as leader of the Conservative Party; at that time letters from 48 MPs were required to trigger a vote of no confidence. Following this, Iain Dale put her on his annual Top 100 Most Influential Conservatives of 2018 List.

In May 2019, Jenkyns received media attention for her appearance on the BBC's Politics Live show, as she was unable to name any countries that trade solely with the EU using World Trade Organization (WTO) terms.

Jenkyns has received a number of death threats, largely as a result of her stance on Brexit. In 2018, she received a threatening and sexually explicit email calling for her to be cut with barbed wire and die. In the summer of 2019, a person was taken to court for threatening to "rip" her face off. In October 2019 she discovered graffiti on the wall of her office calling for her to kill herself.

In October 2019, Jenkyns stated her opposition to Britain's sugary drink tax, arguing instead for "better education, better labelling [and] parental responsibility".

In November 2019, Jenkyns received a campaign donation declared at £2,000 from the Brexit advocate and Leave.EU funder Arron Banks. Banks was barred from membership of the Conservative Party at the time, on the grounds that he had advocated entryism.

Jenkyns held her seat at the 2019 general election with an increased majority of 11,267. Jenkyns said she had experienced a considerable amount of abuse and intimidation during the campaign. After the election, she was elected Vice-Chair of the European Research Group, replacing Steve Baker, who became the Chair.

In February 2020, Jenkyns defended her decision to provide a character reference for the court case of a Conservative Party activist who made violent threats to Labour MP Yvette Cooper and was subsequently jailed for nine weeks. The statement described the activist as a "decent and honest person whose heart is in the right place". Jenkyns said that the activist had mental health issues and she wanted his emotional and mental well-being to be taken into consideration as part of the judicial process.

On 17 September 2021, Jenkyns was appointed an Assistant Government Whip in the second cabinet reshuffle of the second Johnson ministry.

In September 2021, Jenkyns was appointed Parliamentary Private Secretary to the Chief Whip, a position she held until July 2022.

In July 2022, Jenkyns was appointed Parliamentary Under-Secretary of State at the Department for Education. On the way to attending Boris Johnson's resignation speech in Downing Street, Jenkyns was filmed making a "middle finger" gesture at protesters. Jenkyns said she made the gesture after being provoked by a "baying mob", stating she had received "huge amounts of abuse from some of the people who were there over the years". She said she should have shown more composure "but is only human". Her gesture was criticised by teaching representatives and by Conservative MPs Mark Spencer and George Freeman. On 12 July 2022, her portfolio was confirmed as Parliamentary Under-Secretary of State for Skills, Further and Higher Education.

Jenkyns endorsed Liz Truss in the July–September 2022 Conservative Party leadership election. She was reappointed a minister by Truss when Truss became prime minister in September 2022, but left her role when Rishi Sunak replaced Truss 49 days later.

Following the November 2023 British cabinet reshuffle, Jenkyns submitted a public letter of no confidence in Sunak.

At the 2024 general election, her constituency of Morley and Outwood was abolished. Jenkyns stood instead for the newly created seat of Leeds South West and Morley, where she came second with 9,258 votes to Labour candidate Mark Sewards, who received 17,681.

== Post-parliamentary career and mayoralty ==
On 20 September 2024, Jenkyns posted on X from the Reform UK party conference, "I'm a former Tory MP, I'm not defecting. I'm on a press pass and I'm keen to find out what it's all about. Is this the true home of conservatism and why have we lost so many members to the Reform party."

On 28 November 2024, Jenkyns announced at a press conference with Reform leader Nigel Farage that she had left the Conservatives to join the party, and that she would stand as the Reform candidate for the new mayorship of Greater Lincolnshire.

During the election campaign, a formal complaint was lodged with the Electoral Commission that Jenkyns did not meet the residence requirement to be a registered voter in Lincolnshire and that she was therefore ineligible to be a candidate. A hearing was due to be held prior to the 1 May election day. On 25 April, the allegations were dismissed.

Jenkyns stood as the Reform UK candidate in the 2025 Greater Lincolnshire mayoral election and won with 42% of the vote, on a turnout of approximately 30%.

Between 2023 and 2025 Jenkyns was an unpaid director of Net Zero Watch, a campaign group she characterised as "[highlighting] the serious implications of expensive and poorly considered climate change policies on the British Taxpayer". She rejects the scientific consensus on climate change, stating on Times Radio in July 2025, "Do I believe that climate change exists? No". When challenged that this is contrary to evidence, she responded that it "depends what evidence you look at" and that she thinks it is a "money-making racket".

In July 2025, Jenkyns, Reform UK chairman Richard Tice and Reform UK leader of Lincolnshire County Council, Sean Matthews, "declared war" on green energy projects. The three launched a campaign against wind and solar farms and battery storage facilities, with Jenkyns saying that oil and gas were the answer to the UK's energy needs. Jenkyns echoed the phrase of U.S. president Trump, saying if Reform UK win the next UK general election it will mean "drill baby drill".

In August 2025, Jenkyns was chosen by Nigel Farage to be part of Reform UK's decision-making board.

On 5 September 2025, at the opening of Reform UK's party conference, Jenkyns walked onto the stage singing a self-written song entitled 'Insomniac'.

In September 2025, Jenkyns asked for her office budget as mayor to be increased by £147,000, saying, "I literally have zero people in my team", and that she had to stay up into the morning answering some emails herself.

In February 2026, documents showed that Jenkyns approached a US oil and gas executive in the hope of bringing fracking to the UK.

== Personal life ==
Jenkins married Conservative MP Jack Lopresti, in St Mary Undercroft in the Palace of Westminster on 22 December 2017, two years after it had been reported that she was in a relationship with him while he was still married to his first wife, Lucy. They divorced in 2023.

Jenkyns suffers from fibromyalgia and glossopharyngeal neuralgia, which cause bouts of debilitating pain. She also has ADHD.

She supports keeping the ban on fox hunting. In 2015, her dogs Lady and Godiva won top prize in the Westminster Dog of the Year show.

Jenkyns is also an amateur soprano singer.

== Electoral history ==
General election 2015: Morley and Outwood
Party	Candidate	Votes	%	±%
Conservative	Andrea Jenkyns	18,776	38.9	+3.6
Labour Co-op	Ed Balls	18,354	38.0	+0.4
UKIP	David Dews	7,951	16.5	+13.4
Liberal Democrats	Rebecca Taylor	1,426	3.0	−13.8
Green	Martin Hemingway	1,264	2.6	New
Yorkshire First	Arnie Craven	479	1.0	New
Majority		422	0.9	N/A
Turnout		48,250	63.3	−2.5
Conservative gain from Labour Co-op		Swing	+1.6	

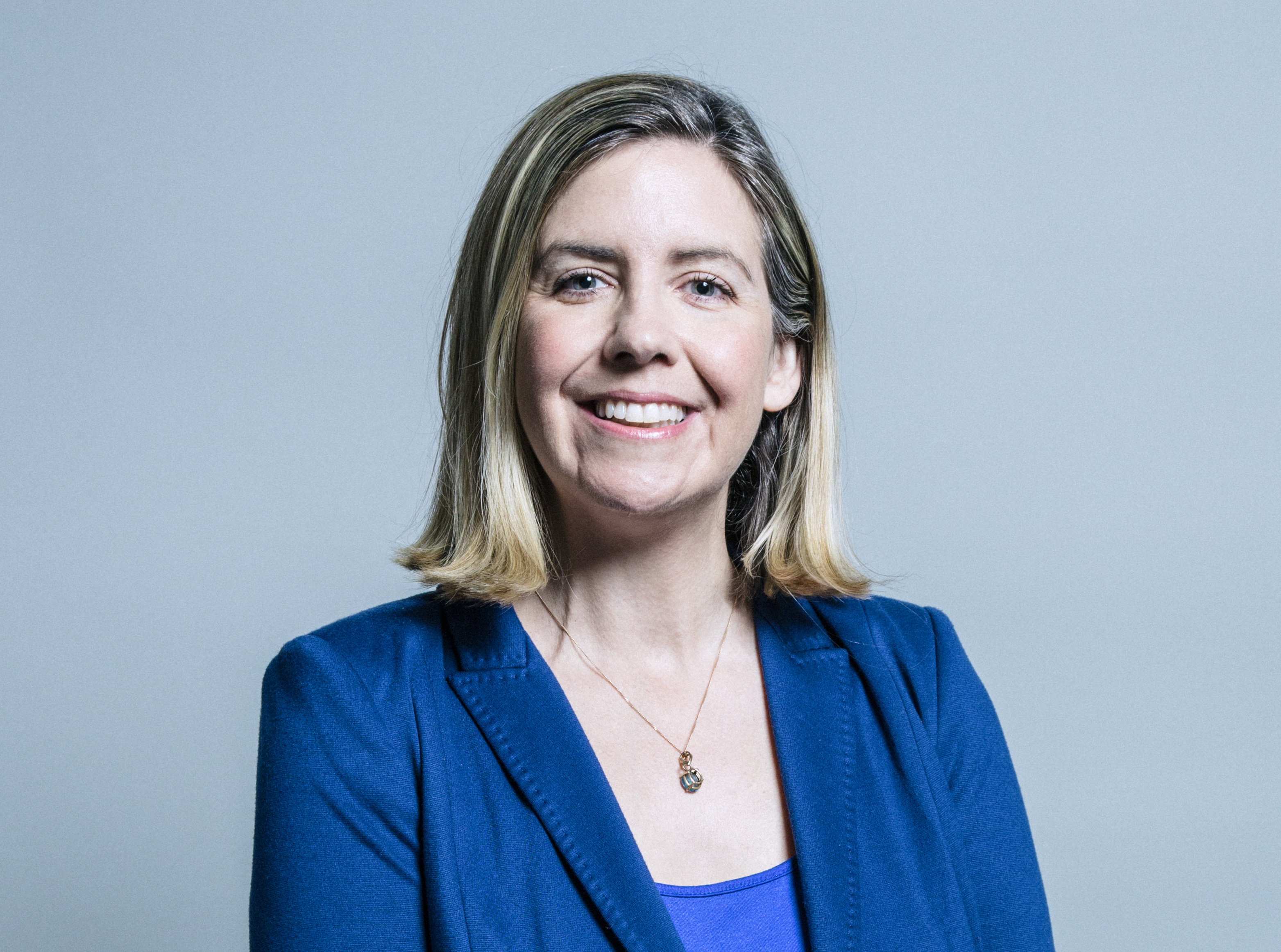
Jenkyns 2017 official portrait

General election 2017: Morley and Outwood
Party	Candidate	Votes	%	±%
Conservative	Andrea Jenkyns	26,550	50.7	+11.8
Labour Co-op	Neil Dawson	24,446	46.7	+8.7
Liberal Democrats	Craig Dobson	1,361	2.6	−0.4
Majority		2,104	4.0	+3.1
Turnout		52,357	68.0	+4.7
Conservative hold		Swing	+1.6	

General election 2019: Morley and Outwood
Party	Candidate	Votes	%	±%
Conservative	Andrea Jenkyns	29,424	56.7	+6.0
Labour	Deanne Ferguson	18,157	35.0	−11.7
Liberal Democrats	Craig Dobson	2,285	4.4	+1.8
Green	Chris Bell	1,107	2.1	New
Yorkshire	Dan Woodlock	957	1.8	New
Majority		11,267	21.7	+17.7
Turnout		51,930	65.9	−2.1
Conservative hold		Swing	+8.8	

General election 2024: Leeds South West and Morley
Party	Candidate	Votes	%	±%
Labour	Mark Sewards	17,681	44.0	+7.2
Conservative	Andrea Jenkyns	9,258	23.0	−30.1
Reform	James Kendall	8,187	20.4	+18.6
Green	Chris Bell	2,522	6.3	+3.0
Liberal Democrats	Michael Fox	1,798	4.5	+1.7
Yorkshire	Howard Graham Dews	664	1.7	−0.5
SDP	Nigel Perry	99	0.2	N/A
Majority		8,423	21.0	N/A
Turnout		40,209	56.0	−5.1
Registered electors		71,854		
Labour gain from Conservative		Swing	▲18.7	

2025 Greater Lincolnshire mayoral election
Party	Candidate	Votes	%	±%
Reform	Andrea Jenkyns	104,133	42.0	N/A
Conservative	Rob Waltham	64,585	26.1	N/A
Labour	Jason Stockwood	30,384	12.3	N/A
Lincolnshire Independent	Marianne Overton	19,911	8.0	N/A
Green	Sally Horscroft	15,040	6.1	'N/A
Liberal Democrats	Trevor Young	13,728	5.5	N/A
Majority		39,548	15.9	N/A
Turnout		249,792	30.15	N/A
Registered electors		828,613		
Reform win (new seat)				

== Discography ==
=== Studio albums ===
List of studio albums
Title	Album details
Ilyis	Released: 2006; Format: CD

== Honours ==
Jenkyns was appointed Dame Commander of the Order of the British Empire on 9 June 2023 as part of the 2022 Prime Minister's Resignation Honours, the honours awarded following the September 2022 resignation of Boris Johnson.

== Notes ==
Parliament of the United Kingdom
Preceded by Ed Balls	Member of Parliament for Morley and Outwood; 2015–2024	Constituency abolished
Political offices
New office	Mayor of Greater Lincolnshire; 2025–present	Incumbent
