= Style DNA =

AI-powered fashion styling and wardrobe management app

- Developer: AI Style by DNA S.L.U.
- Release: 2022
- Operating system: iOS, Android
- Website: https://styledna.ai/

Style DNA is a fashion styling and wardrobe management mobile app that uses artificial intelligence to generate personalized clothing and outfit recommendations. The app analyzes information about a user's appearance, body characteristics and preferences and provides color-analysis recommendations, wardrobe management and personalized outfit suggestions.

The company behind Style DNA was founded in 2019, with Elena Volkova as a co-founder and chief executive officer. The application was launched in 2022. By June 2024, the company reported 3.2 million downloads, more than 300,000 active users and 70,000 paying subscribers. TechCrunch also reported that the company had previously raised €3.4 million in pre-seed funding from Black River Ventures.

== History ==
Elena Volkova, a co-founder and chief executive of Style DNA, previously held senior positions in e-commerce companies in strategy and finance. According to an interview published by The Successful Founder, she developed the idea for Style DNA after using personal image consulting services and considering how artificial intelligence could make similar advice more widely available.

The company was founded in 2019, and the Style DNA application was launched in 2022.

In 2024, Style DNA introduced a generative AI chatbot designed to act as a conversational personal stylist. The feature allowed users to ask questions about clothing and outfits and receive recommendations based on their personal style profile.

== Features and technology ==
Style DNA creates a personal style profile using a user's selfie together with information supplied through questionnaires. The application analyzes characteristics such as skin tone, facial features, height, body type and clothing preferences. It can assign a user a seasonal color type and generate a corresponding color palette.

The app also includes a digital wardrobe in which users can upload photographs of their clothing. The application can use information about the user's existing clothes when generating outfit suggestions and can recommend additional clothing from retailers.

In 2024, the application introduced a generative AI chatbot. According to TechCrunch, Style DNA combined a large language model with fashion databases, information about current trends, professional image-consulting expertise and a dataset containing millions of images. The publication reported that the application used GPT-4 as its large language model.

The app's recommendations are based primarily on information supplied by the user rather than solely on previous shopping behaviour. The service has also offered shopping recommendations from a marketplace containing products from more than 150 retailers.

== Reception and research ==
Style DNA has been covered by technology and fashion publications as an example of the use of artificial intelligence for personal styling. In 2024, TechCrunch reported on the introduction of its generative AI assistant and described features including seasonal color analysis, wardrobe management and personalized shopping recommendations.

In 2025, the Spanish newspaper El País included Style DNA in a comparison of mobile applications for creating outfits. The publication described the app's analysis of physical characteristics, shopping preferences and wardrobe items, as well as its AI styling assistant and virtual outfit features.

A 2025 study published in the peer-reviewed journal Sustainability examined 27 wardrobe management applications using a thematic analysis of 5,953 user reviews from the Apple App Store and Google Play. Style DNA was included in the study, with 696 Google Play reviews and 78 Apple App Store reviews represented in the dataset.

In December 2025, New York Post published a hands-on test of Style DNA as part of an examination of AI-based styling services. The article described the app's use of wardrobe photographs, color analysis and personalized outfit recommendations, but reported that some of the generated outfit combinations were considered impractical by the reviewer.
