= Mayor of Greater Lincolnshire =

Political position

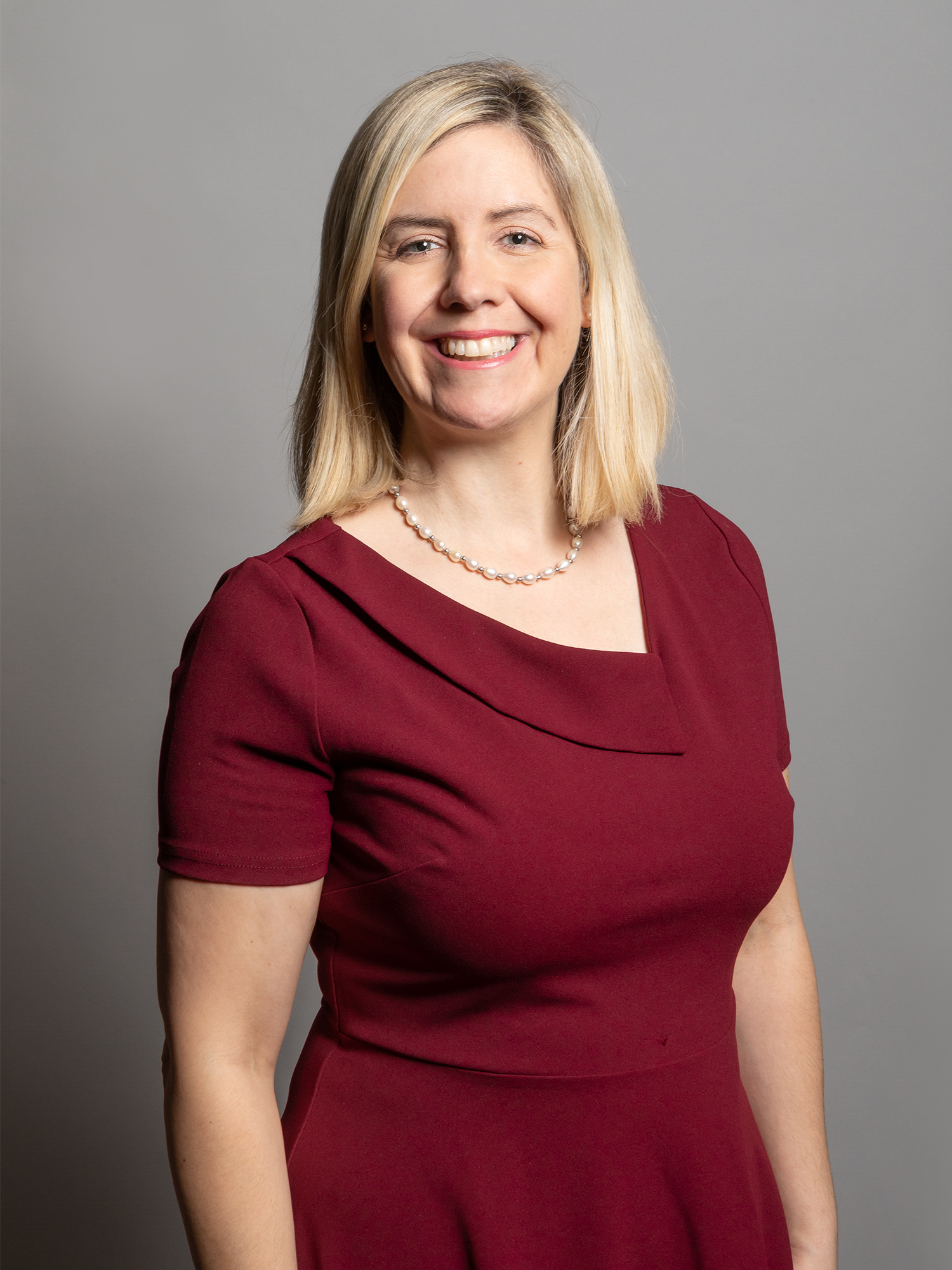
- Incumbent; Andrea Jenkyns since 6 May 2025
- Style: Mayor
- Appointer: Electorate of Greater Lincolnshire
- Term length: Four years
- Inaugural holder: Andrea Jenkyns
- Formation: 6 May 2025
- Website: https://greaterlincolnshire-cca.gov.uk/about-1/mayor

Map of Greater Lincolnshire

The mayor of Greater Lincolnshire is the strategic authority mayor who leads the Greater Lincolnshire Combined County Authority. The body, a combined authority, is responsible for the strategic administration of Greater Lincolnshire, including planning, transport and skills.

The first election to the position was held on 1 May 2025, with the mayor's term of office commencing on 6 May 2025. The first elected mayor is Andrea Jenkyns of Reform UK. Jenkyns was previously a Conservative Party MP. She defected to Reform UK in November 2024.

The mayoralty covers the whole of the ceremonial county of Lincolnshire, comprising the areas administered by Lincolnshire County Council, North Lincolnshire Council and North East Lincolnshire Council.

Since becoming mayor, Jenkyns has denied the existence of climate change. In February 2026, documents showed that Jenkyns courted an American oil and gas dynasty owned by Trump donor, George Yates, about bringing fracking to Lincolnshire.

In July 2025, Jenkyns, Reform UK chairman Richard Tice and Reform UK leader of Lincolnshire County Council, Sean Matthews, "declared war" on green energy projects. The three launched a campaign against wind and solar farms and battery storage facilities, with Jenkyns saying that oil and gas were the answer to the UK's energy needs. Jenkyns echoed the phrase of U.S. president Trump, saying if Reform UK win the next UK general election it will mean "drill baby drill".

== List of mayors ==
Colour key
(for political parties)
Reform UK

Mayors of Greater Lincolnshire
| Name | | Portrait | Term of office | | Elected | Political party | Previous and concurrent occupations |
|---|---|---|---|---|---|---|---|
| 1 | Andrea Jenkyns (born 1974) | | 6 May 2025 | Incumbent | 2025 | Reform UK | Member of Parliament for Morley and Outwood (2015–2024); Lincolnshire County Councillor; Parliamentary Under-Secretary of State for Skills, Further and Higher Education (2022); Assistant Government Whip (2021–2022) |

=== Deputy Mayors of Greater Lincolnshire ===
Colour key
(for political parties)
Reform UK

Deputy Mayors of Greater Lincolnshire
| Name | | Term of office | | Political party | Previous and concurrent occupations |
|---|---|---|---|---|---|
| 1 | Ingrid Sheard | 4 June 2025 | Incumbent | Reform UK | Lincolnshire County Councillor; South Holland District Councillor |

== Elections ==
=== Elections in the 2020s ===
2025 Greater Lincolnshire mayoral election
| Party | Candidate | Votes | % |
|---|---|---|---|
| Reform | Andrea Jenkyns | 104,133 | 42.0 |
| Conservative | Rob Waltham | 64,585 | 26.1 |
| Labour | Jason Stockwood | 30,384 | 12.3 |
| Lincolnshire Independent | Marianne Overton | 19,911 | 8.0 |
| Green | Sally Horscroft | 15,040 | 6.1 |
| Liberal Democrats | Trevor Young | 13,728 | 5.5 |
| Rejected ballots | | 2,011 | 0.8 |
| Majority | | 39,548 | 15.9 |
| Turnout | | 249,792 | 30.15 |
| Reform win (new seat) | | | |
