= Jason Stockwood, Baron Stockwood =

English businessman

The Right Honourable The Lord Stockwood
- Official portrait, 2026

Minister of State for Investment
- In office 6 September 2025 – 21 July 2026
- Prime Minister: Keir Starmer
- Preceded by: The Baroness Gustafsson
- Succeeded by: Chris McDonald

Member of the House of Lords
- Lord Temporal
- Life peerage 9 October 2025

Personal details
- Born: Jason Stockwood; July 1970 (age 56) Grimsby, Lincolnshire, England
- Party: Labour
- Spouse: Lorna Stockwood
- Children: 2
- Education: University of Bolton (BA)
- Occupation: Chairman; businessman; entrepreneur; director

Jason Stockwood, Baron Stockwood (born July 1970) is an English businessman and life peer who is joint majority shareholder and former chairman of Grimsby Town F.C.

Having graduated with a Bachelor of Philosophy (BPhil), he moved into the travel business and has previously held roles as the managing director of Travelocity, non-executive of Skyscanner and commercial roles with lastminute.com. He is also the former international managing director of dating website Match.com. In 2010 he joined Simply Business, a tech start up in financial services where he was group CEO.

He was the Labour Party candidate for the 2025 Greater Lincolnshire mayoral election. In September 2025, he was appointed to the British government as Minister of State for Investment, jointly serving in the Department of Business and Trade and HM Treasury. As it is convention that all ministers sit in one of the two Houses of Parliament, he received a life peerage to sit in the House of Lords.

== Early life ==
Stockwood was born in Grimsby and attended Tollbar Academy in the village of New Waltham, near Grimsby. Stockwood comes from a working class family; his mother was a single parent who worked three jobs to keep four sons clothed and fed. Aged 15, he worked as a waiter at the Winter Gardens in Cleethorpes and worked on Grimsby docks for a few months. After leaving school, Stockwood went on a kibbutz in Israel, he went on to work at Walt Disney World in Florida and as a holiday rep in Greece, before studying full-time in 1992 at University in Bolton.

Stockwood is a lifelong supporter of his home town football club Grimsby Town; in 1979 he attended his first game against Sheffield Wednesday. He was a ballboy in November 1984 for The Mariners at Blundell Park in a fixture against Wolverhampton Wanderers.

== Business career ==
He graduated with a degree in philosophy from the University of Bolton in 1995. Having spent time working in the travel industry as managing director of Travelocity Business, non-executive at Skyscanner and commercial roles with lastminute.com, Stockwood went on to become the international managing director of dating website match.com.

In 2010, Stockwood became CEO and then vice-chairman of Simply Business. Simply Business was voted as the number one ‘Best Place to Work’ in the UK by The Sunday Times in both 2015 and 2016, with Stockwood winning the overall Best Leader award in the latter year. The company's awards led to it being accredited as a certified B Corporation. Simply Business raised capital through a number of private equity investors, most notably from New York-based Aquiline Private Equity. It was eventually sold to The Travelers Companies in 2017 for $500m.

He is an investor in early stage technology companies through 53 Degrees Capital. Notable investments include Olio, Chiaro, Be My Eyes and AI social services company, Beam.

Since 2019 he has been the chair of the board raising the money to build the Horizon Youth Zone in Grimsby.

In 2020 he was invited to become a Transformational Leadership Fellow at The Blavatnik School of Government, The University of Oxford.

Since 2021 he has written a number of articles for The Guardian newspaper relating to football, politics and culture.

== Football ownership ==
Stockwood was announced as part of a consortium, led by London businessman Tom Shutes, which was interested in buying out John Fenty's majority control of Grimsby Town. Shutes later pulled out for personal reasons, which prompted Stockwood and other consortium member Andrew Pettit to form a company called 1878 Partners, which on 5 May successfully completed the takeover of the club with Stockwood named as chairman. He wrote an article in The Guardian detailing why.

On 5 June 2022 Grimsby Town FC were promoted back to the EFL after just one year in the National League and 13 months after Stockwood and Pettit took ownership of the club.

On 1 March 2023, Grimsby advanced to the quarter finals of the FA Cup for the first time since 1939 by beating Premier League side Southampton 2–1 away from home, becoming the first club in the competition's history to knock out five teams from a higher division.

Stockwood swapped with Andrew Pettit as the chairman of Grimsby Town in May 2024, after both shareholders said they would share the position.

== Political career ==
Stockwood was selected as the Labour candidate for the 2025 election for the inaugural mayor of Greater Lincolnshire. The election covers the entire ceremonial county of Lincolnshire, which is governed by three councils: Lincolnshire County Council, North Lincolnshire Council, and North East Lincolnshire Council. As a result of the nomination, he stepped back from the board of Grimsby Town F.C. until the outcome of the May 2025 election. He lost the race to Reform.

In the 2025 British cabinet reshuffle, he was named the new Minister of State for Investment. As he was not an elected Member of Parliament at the time of his appointment, he was granted a life peerage so as to sit in the House of Lords. He was created as Baron Stockwood, of Great Grimsby and Cleethorpes in the County of Lincolnshire on 9 October 2025.

== Bibliography ==
- Reboot: A Blueprint for Happy, Human Business in the Digital Age (2018)
