= Simply Business =

Online insurance company

- Company type: Private
- Industry: Insurance
- Founded: 2005; 21 years ago
- Headquarters: London, United Kingdom
- Key people: David Summers (Group CEO)
- Products: Business insurance, Shop insurance and Landlord insurance
- Revenue: £148.6m million (2022)
- Number of employees: 800
- Website: simplybusiness.com

Simply Business is a digital broker and agency for small business insurance.

== History ==
Xbridge, Simply Business’ holding company, was founded by Brad Liebmann, Ralph Arnold, Deno Fischer and Jim Nelson in 2000. Simply Business was launched in 2005 as an online broker for business insurance and the trading name of Xbridge.

In 2010, Jason Stockwood joined the company as chief executive officer.

In July 2013 the company completed a management buy-out backed by the private equity firm AnaCap Financial Partners. In April 2015, AnaCap sold its stake in Simply Business to Aquiline Capital Partners for £120m.

Simply Business launched their first office in the United States in December 2016. In August 2017, The Travelers Companies acquired the company from Aquiline Capital Partners for approximately $490 million.

In November 2018, David Summers, then UK CEO, replaced Jason Stockwood as Group CEO.

In 2021, Simply Business was selected to participate in the Amazon Insurance Accelerator Program to distribute general liability coverage to Amazon sellers. As of 2022, the company's revenue was reportedly £148.6m.

The company has been reported to be a certified B Corp, but as of January 2026 are not listed on the B Labs register. As of 2023, the company had over 900,000 customers globally.
