= AutoGPT =

Open source autonomous AI agent

- Developer: Toran Bruce Richards
- Release: March 30, 2023; 3 years ago
- Written in: Python, TypeScript
- Type: Autonomous artificial intelligence software agent
- License: MIT License
- Website: https://agpt.co
- Repository: github.com/Significant-Gravitas/AutoGPT

AutoGPT is an open-source autonomous software agent that uses OpenAI's large language models, such as GPT-4, to attempt to achieve a goal specified by a user in natural language. Unlike chatbots that require continuous user commands, AutoGPT works autonomously by breaking the main goal into smaller sub-tasks and using tools like web browsing and file management to complete them.

Released in March 2023, the project quickly gained popularity on GitHub and social media, with users creating agents for tasks like software development, market research, and content creation. One notable experiment, ChaosGPT, was tasked with destroying humanity, which brought mainstream attention to the technology's potential. However, AutoGPT is known for significant limitations, including a tendency to get stuck in loops, hallucinate information, and incur high operational costs due to its reliance on paid APIs.

== Background ==
AutoGPT was released on March 30, 2023, by Toran Bruce Richards, the founder of video game company Significant Gravitas Ltd. It was one of the first widely accessible applications to showcase the autonomous capabilities of GPT-4, which had been released weeks earlier. Richards's goal was to create a model that could respond to real-time feedback and pursue objectives with a long-term outlook without needing constant human intervention.

The application operates by prompting a user to define an agent's name, role, and main objective, including up to five sub-goals to achieve it. AutoGPT then works independently to reach its objective. The project is publicly available on GitHub but requires users to install it in a development environment like Docker and have a paid OpenAI account to obtain the necessary API key.

In October 2023, the project's parent company, Significant Gravitas Ltd., raised $12 million in venture funding to support further development.

== Capabilities ==
The overarching capability of AutoGPT is the breaking down of a large task into various sub-tasks without the need for user input. These sub-tasks are then chained together and performed sequentially to yield a larger result as originally laid out by the user input. One of the distinguishing features of AutoGPT is its ability to connect to the internet. This allows for up-to-date information retrieval to help complete tasks.

In addition, AutoGPT maintains short-term memory for the current task, which allows it to provide context to subsequent sub-tasks needed to achieve the larger goal. Another feature is its ability to store and organize files so users can better structure their data for future analysis and extension. AutoGPT is also multimodal, which means that it can take in both text and images as input. With these features, AutoGPT is claimed to be capable of automating workflows, analyzing data, and coming up with new suggestions.

== Applications ==
=== Software ===
AutoGPT can be used to develop software applications from scratch. AutoGPT can also debug code and generate test cases. Observers suggest that AutoGPT's ability to write, debug, test, and edit code may extend to AutoGPT's own source code, enabling self-improvement.

=== Business ===
AutoGPT can be used to do market research, analyze investments, research products and write product reviews, create a business plan or improve operations, and create content such as a blog or podcast. One user has used AutoGPT to conduct product research and write a summary on the best headphones. Another user has used AutoGPT to summarize recent news events and prepare an outline for a podcast.

=== Other ===
AutoGPT was used to create ChefGPT, an AI agent able to independently explore the internet to generate and save unique recipes. AutoGPT was also used to create ChaosGPT, an AI agent tasked to “destroy humanity, establish global dominance, cause chaos and destruction, control humanity through manipulation, and attain immortality”. ChaosGPT reportedly researched nuclear weapons and tweeted disparagingly about humankind.

== Limitations ==
AutoGPT is susceptible to frequent mistakes, primarily because it relies on its own feedback, which can compound errors. In contrast, non-autonomous models can be corrected by users overseeing their outputs. Furthermore, AutoGPT has a tendency to hallucinate or to present false or misleading information as fact when responding.

AutoGPT can be constrained by the cost associated with running it as its recursive nature requires it to continually call the OpenAI API on which it is built. Every step required in one of AutoGPT's tasks requires a corresponding call to GPT-4 at a cost of at least about $0.03 for every 1000 tokens used for inputs and $0.06 for every 1000 tokens for output when choosing the cheapest option. For reference, 1000 tokens roughly result in 750 words.

Another limitation is AutoGPT's tendency to get stuck in infinite loops. Developers believe that this is a result of AutoGPT's inability to remember, as it is unaware of what it has already done and repeatedly attempts the same subtask without end. Andrej Karpathy, co-founder of OpenAI which creates GPT-4, further explains that it is AutoGPT's “finite context window” that can limit its performance and cause it to “go off the rails”. Like other autonomous agents, AutoGPT is prone to distraction and unable to focus on its objective due to its lack of long-term memory, leading to unpredictable and unintended behavior.

== Reception ==
AutoGPT became the top trending repository on GitHub after its release and has since repeatedly trended on Twitter.

In April 2023, Avram Piltch wrote for Tom's Hardware that AutoGPT 'might be too autonomous to be useful,' as it did not ask questions to clarify requirements or allow corrective interventions by users. Piltch nonetheless noted that such tools have "a ton of potential" and should improve with better language models and further development.

Malcolm McMillan from Tom's Guide mentioned that AutoGPT may not be better than ChatGPT for tasks involving conversation, as ChatGPT is well-suited for situations in which advice, rather than task completion, is sought.

Will Knight from Wired wrote that AutoGPT is not a foolproof task-completion tool. When given a test task of finding a public figure's email address, he noted that it was not able to accurately find the email address.

Clara Shih, Salesforce Service Cloud CEO commented that "AutoGPT illustrates the power and unknown risks of generative AI," and that due to usage risks, enterprises should include a human in the loop when using such technologies.

Performance is reportedly enhanced when using AutoGPT with GPT-4 compared to GPT-3.5. For example, one reviewer who tested it on a task of finding the best laptops on the market with pros and cons found that AutoGPT with GPT-4 created a more comprehensive report than one by GPT 3.5.

== See also ==
- ChatGPT - Large Language Model-based Chatbot by OpenAI
- GPT-3 - 2020 Large Language Model by OpenAI
- GPT-4 - 2023 Large Language Model by OpenAI
- Artificial general intelligence - Hypothetical intelligent agent that could learn to accomplish any intellectual task that humans can perform
- Hallucination (artificial intelligence) - Responses generated by an AI that contain false information that are presented as fact.
