= 2025 Greater Lincolnshire mayoral election =

Local election in the UK

- 1 May 2025
- Registered: 828,613
- Turnout: 29.9%
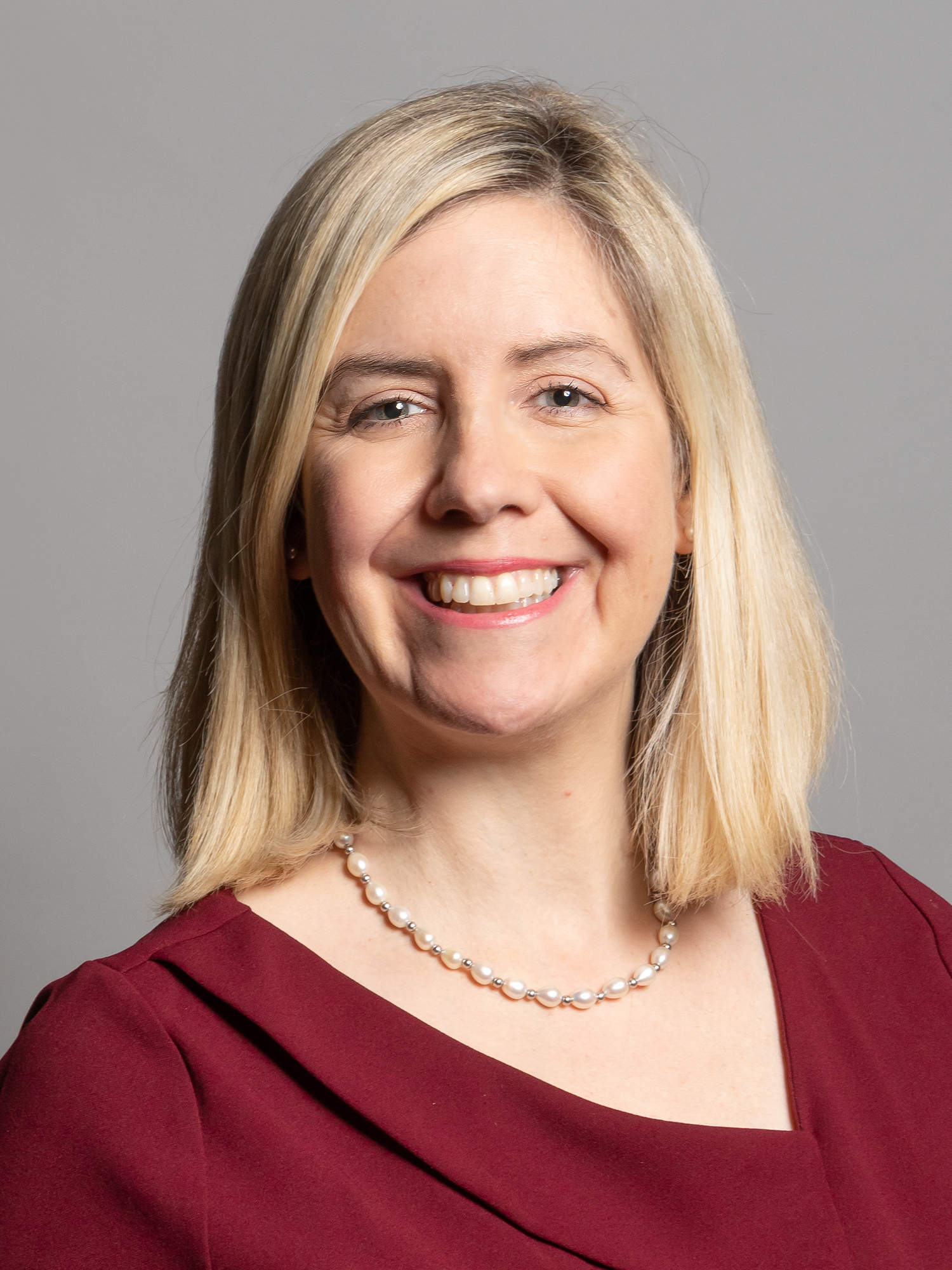

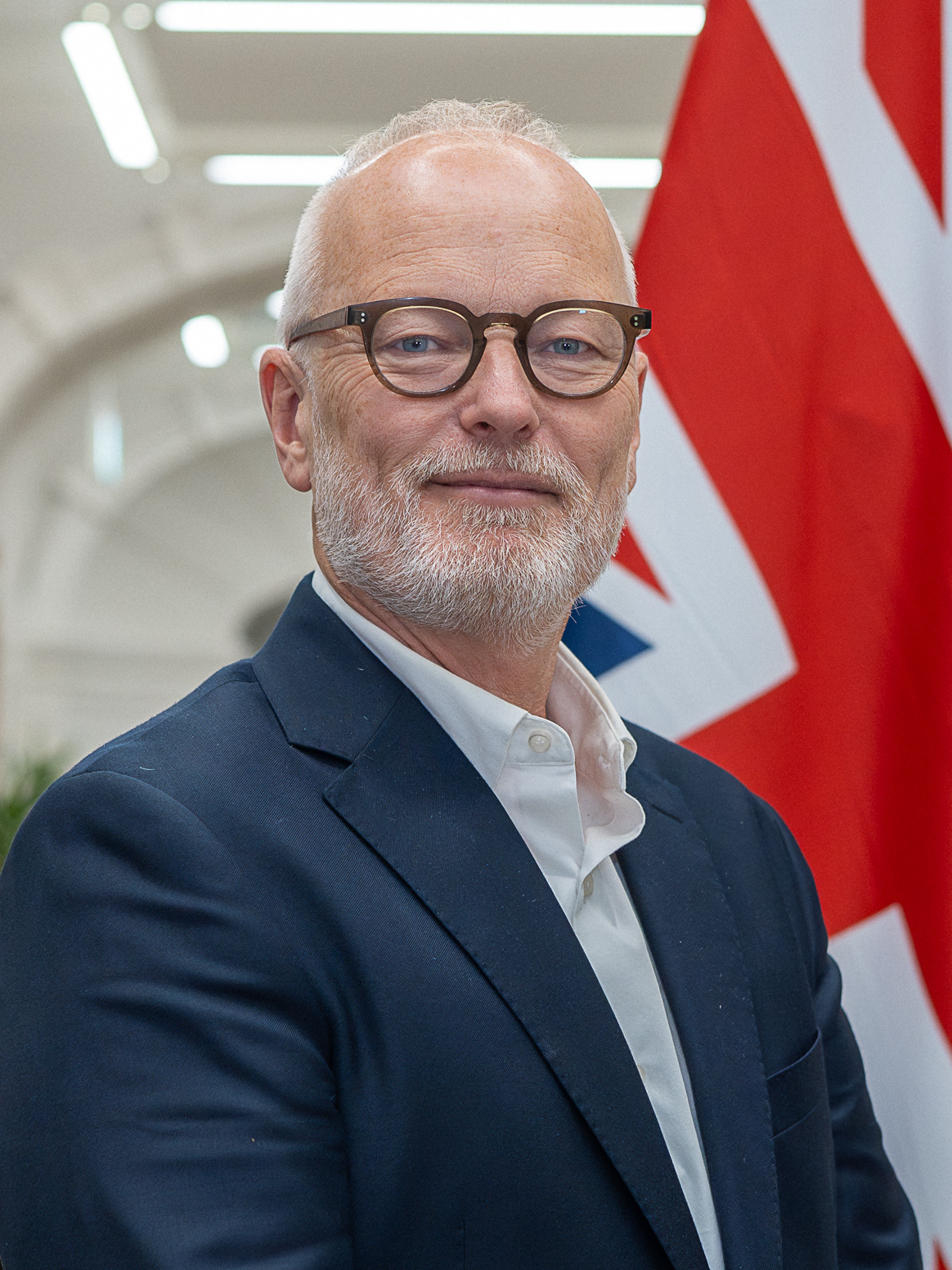

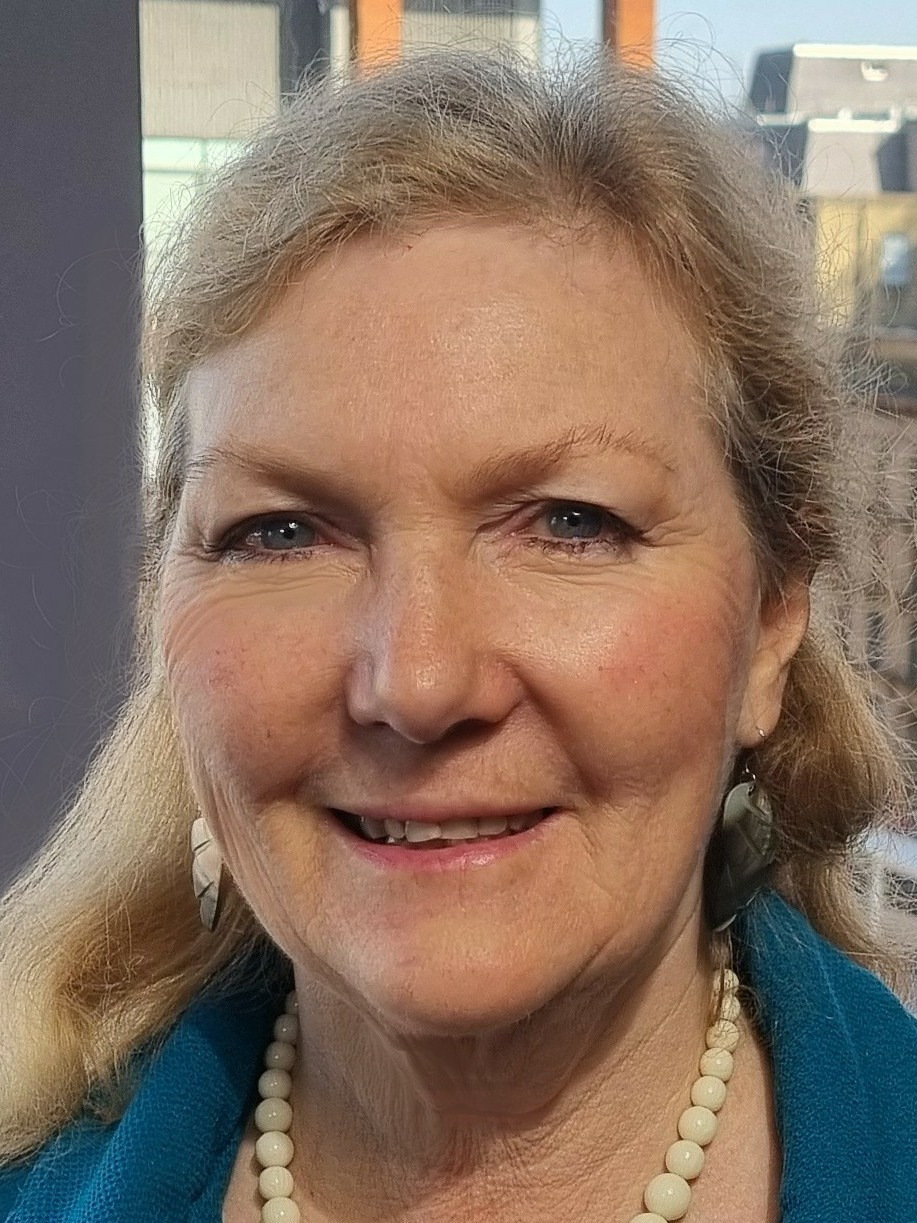
Candidate	Andrea Jenkyns	Rob Waltham	Jason Stockwood
Party	Reform	Conservative	Labour
Popular vote	104,133	64,585	30,384
Percentage	42.0%	26.1%	12.3%
Candidate	Marianne Overton	Sally Horscroft	Trevor Young
Party	Lincolnshire Independent	Green	Liberal Democrats
Popular vote	19,911	15,040	13,728
Percentage	8.0%	6.1%	5.5%
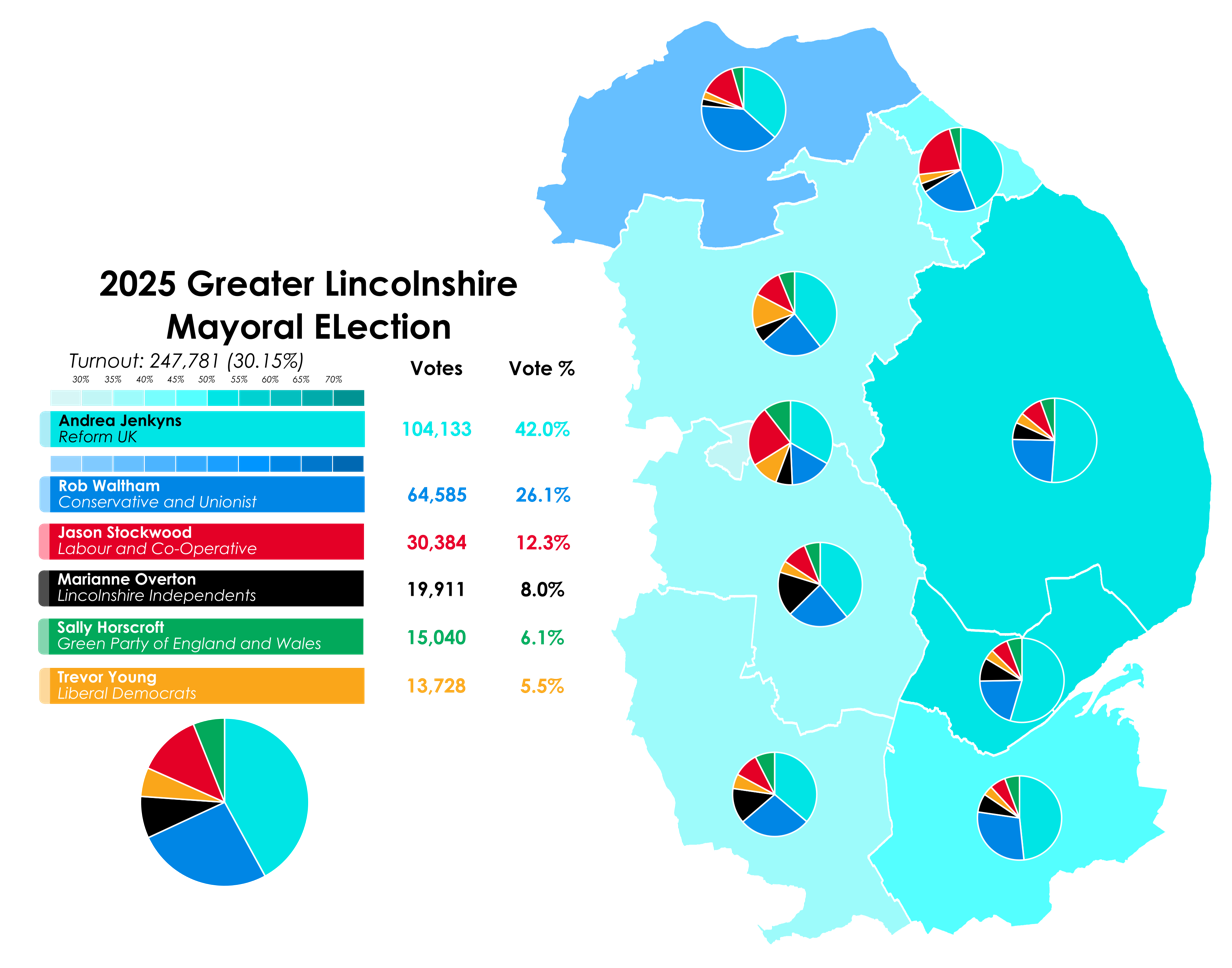
- Results of the election by district
Mayor before election
Did not exist
Elected Mayor
Andrea Jenkyns
Reform

The 2025 Greater Lincolnshire mayoral election was held on 1 May 2025 to elect the inaugural mayor of Greater Lincolnshire, on the same day as other local elections across the country.

Andrea Jenkyns of Reform UK won the election with 42% of the vote, from a turnout of 29.9%.

== Background ==
The election covers the entire historic and ceremonial county of Lincolnshire, which is governed by three councils: Lincolnshire County Council, North Lincolnshire Council, and North East Lincolnshire Council. Those councils will remain in place, with some powers being transferred to the new mayor.

== Electoral system ==
The election used the voting system of first past the post to elect the mayor. In this system the candidate with the most votes wins, even if they do not win an overall majority of the vote share. The Electoral Reform Society described the move towards first past the post as one lowering the bar for politicians and thus damaging British democracy.

== Candidates ==
Several individuals either publicly expressed interest or had media speculation about the possibility of them running:

=== Declared ===
- Sally Horscroft, parliamentary candidate for Lincoln in 2019 and 2024 (Green Party)
- Dame Andrea Jenkyns, former Conservative MP for Morley and Outwood (Reform UK)
- Marianne Overton, Lincolnshire County councillor and Leader of the Opposition on North Kesteven District Council (Lincolnshire Independents)
- Jason Stockwood, businessman (Labour Party)
- Rob Waltham, leader of North Lincolnshire Council (Conservative Party)
- Trevor Young, leader of West Lindsey District Council (Liberal Democrats)

== Opinion polls ==
Dates conducted	Pollster	Client	Sample size	Ref	Con	Lab	Grn	Ind	LD	Lead
2025 mayoral election		1 May 2025	–	42.0%	26.1%	12.3%	6.1%	8.0%	5.5%	15.9
29–30 Apr	Find Out Now	N/A	1,312	41%	26%	12%	9%	7%	4%	15
15–23 Apr	More in Common	The Observer	1,001	33%	30%	17%	7%	8%	6%	3
9–23 Apr	YouGov	N/A	1,218	40%	25%	15%	8%	7%	5%	15

== Results ==
=== Overall results ===
2025 Greater Lincolnshire mayoral election
Party	Candidate	Votes	%
Reform	Andrea Jenkyns	104,133	42.0
Conservative	Rob Waltham	64,585	26.1
Labour Co-op	Jason Stockwood	30,384	12.3
Lincolnshire Independent	Marianne Overton	19,911	8.0
Green	Sally Horscroft	15,040	6.1
Liberal Democrats	Trevor Young	13,728	5.5
Majority		39,548	15.9
Rejected ballots		2,011	0.8
Turnout		249,792	30.15
Registered electors		828,613	
Reform win (new seat)			

=== Results by district ===
Andrea Jenkyns has won across all boroughs except North Lincolnshire, where a Conservative Party candidate Rob Waltham won narrowly.

2025 Greater Lincolnshire mayoral election
Districts	Andrea Jenkyns Reform		Rob Waltham Conservative		Jason Stockwood Labour		Marianne Overton Lincolnshire Independents		Sally Horscroft Green		Trevor Young Liberal Democrats		Total valid votes	Rejected ballots		Turnout		Registered electors
Districts	#	%	#	%	#	%	#	%	#	%	#	%	#	#	%	#	%	#
Boston	7,285	54.54%	2,695	20.18%	897	6.72%	1,193	8.93%	774	5.79%	513	3.84%	13,357	142	1.05%	13,499	27.10%	49,799
City of Lincoln	6,378	33.23%	3,086	16.08%	4,485	23.37%	1,230	6.41%	2,016	10.50%	1,996	10.40%	19,191	193	1.00%	19,384	30.06%	64,473
East Lindsey	19,875	51.15%	9,397	24.18%	3,299	8.49%	2,540	6.54%	2,143	5.52%	1,601	4.12%	38,855	359	0.92%	39,214	35.42%	110,727
North East Lincolnshire	12,523	44.08%	6,239	21.96%	6,419	22.60%	980	3.45%	1,225	4.31%	1,022	3.60%	28,408	84	0.29%	28,492	23.98%	118,835
North Kesteven	11,919	39.02%	7,215	23.62%	2,939	9.62%	5,233	17.13%	1,854	6.07%	1,385	4.53%	30,545	220	0.72%	30,765	32.67%	94,192
North Lincolnshire	12,993	36.68%	14,003	39.53%	4,825	13.62%	977	2.76%	1,604	4.53%	1,021	2.88%	35,423	77	0.22%	35,500	27.29%	130,103
South Holland	10,454	48.34%	6,260	28.95%	1,329	6.15%	1,545	7.14%	1,230	5.69%	808	3.74%	21,626	317	1.44%	21,943	29.71%	73,876
South Kesteven	12,446	36.20%	9,452	27.49%	3,289	9.57%	4,664	13.57%	2,591	7.54%	1,936	5.63%	34,378	367	1.06%	34,745	31.53%	110,216
West Lindsey	10,260	39.46%	6,238	23.99%	2,902	11.16%	1,549	5.96%	1,603	6.17%	3,446	13.25%	25,998	252	0.96%	26,250	34.36%	76,392
Totals	104,133	42.03%	64,585	26.07%	30,384	12.26%	19,911	8.04%	15,040	6.07%	13,728	5.54%	247,781	2,011	0.81%	249,792	30.15%	828,613
