= Sasha Luccioni =

Ukrainian computer scientist (born 1990)

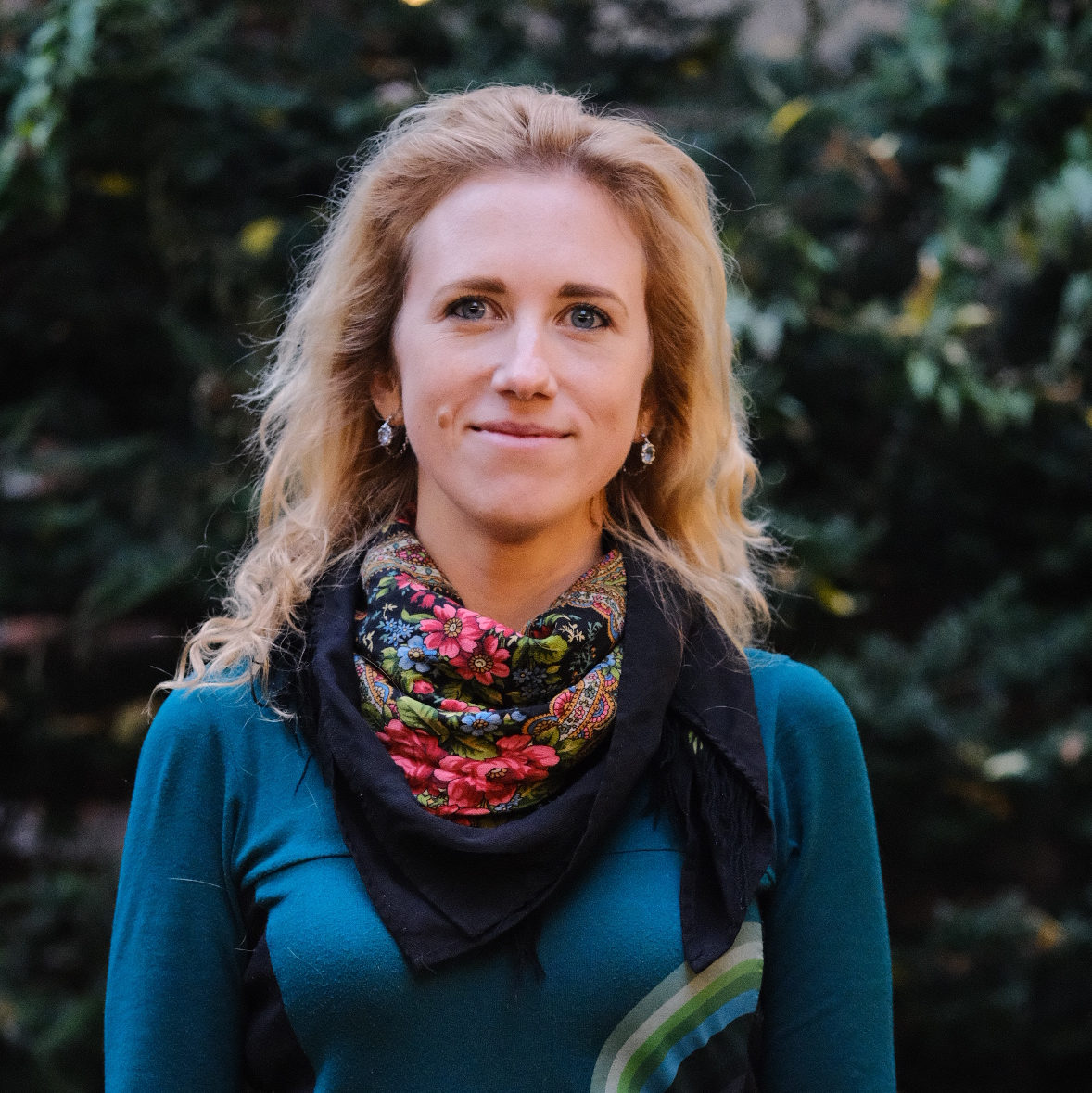
- Luccioni in 2022
- Born: Alexandra Sasha Vorobyova; 1990 (age 35–36); Ukrainian SSR, Soviet Union
- Education: Université Sorbonne Nouvelle; École normale supérieure Université du Québec à Montréal
- Scientific career
- Fields: Environmental impacts of artificial intelligence
- Workplaces: Sustainable AI Group Hugging Face

Alexandra Sasha Luccioni (née Vorobyova; born 1990) is a computer scientist specializing in the intersection of artificial intelligence (AI) and climate change. Her work focuses on quantifying the environmental impact of AI technologies and promoting sustainable practices in machine learning development.

== Early life and education ==
Alexandra Sasha Vorobyova was born in the Ukrainian Soviet Socialist Republic in 1990. When she was four years old, her family relocated to Ontario, Canada. Her interest in science is influenced by her family's history; her mother, grandmother, and great-grandmother all pursued careers in scientific fields.

Luccioni earned a B.A. in language science from University of Paris III: Sorbonne Nouvelle in 2010. Subsequently, she completed a M.S. in cognitive science, with a minor in natural language processing, at École normale supérieure in Paris in 2012. Luccioni obtained her PhD in cognitive computing from Université du Québec à Montréal (UQAM) in 2018.

== Career ==
Luccioni began her professional career at Nuance Communications in 2017, where she focused on natural language processing (NLP) and machine learning (ML) techniques to enhance conversational agents. She then joined Morgan Stanley’s AI/ML Center of Excellence in 2018, working on explainable artificial intelligence (AI) and decision-making systems.

In 2019, she became a postdoctoral researcher at Université de Montréal and Mila, collaborating with computer scientist Yoshua Bengio on a project titled This Climate Does Not Exist. This initiative used generative adversarial networks to visualize the effects of climate change. During this time, she also contributed to integrating fairness and accountability into machine learning education at Mila.

Luccioni briefly worked with the United Nations Global Pulse in 2021, developing tools to monitor COVID-19 misinformation. Later that year, she joined Hugging Face as a research scientist. Her role includes quantifying the carbon footprint of AI systems, co-chairing the carbon working group in the Big Science project, and advancing responsible machine learning practices. She helped create "CodeCarbon," an open-source software tool that estimates the carbon emissions produced during the training and operation of machine learning models.

In addition to CodeCarbon, she led the development of the AI Energy Score, a standardized benchmark that rates AI models by the energy they consume during inference, launched in collaboration with Salesforce.

In 2026, Luccioni left Hugging Face after four years and co-founded the Sustainable AI Group (SAIG) with Boris Gamazaychikov, Salesforce’s former head of AI sustainability. The organization officially launched on May 13, 2026, in Montreal, Canada, and she serves as its Co-Founder and Chief Scientific Officer. The firm describes itself as a research and advisory firm helping enterprises measure, compare, and act on the environmental impacts of AI, and its offerings include open research studies, advisory services for companies, and tailored tools to track AI’s environmental impacts

In addition to her research, she has developed tools to measure the environmental impact of AI models, communicated findings through media engagements, and presented at international conferences, including a TED Talk. In 2024, she was listed on BBC 100 Women and Time 100 AI.
