= Be My Eyes =

Danish mobile app

- Available in: over 180 languages
- Founders: Hans Jørgen Wiberg, Christian Erfurt
- Website: www.bemyeyes.com
- Registration: Required
- Users: Over 9 million volunteers; over 900,000 blind and visually impaired people
- Launched: 2015

Be My Eyes is a Danish mobile app that aims to help blind and visually impaired people recognize objects and manage everyday situations by connecting them with a sighted volunteer when they need help seeing something. An online community of sighted volunteers receive photos or videos from randomly assigned affected individuals and assist via live chat. In 2023, the company launched Be My AI, an AI-based interface to help blind and visually impaired users describe images. The app is currently available for Android, iOS, and Windows.

== History ==
=== Founding and early years ===
The app was developed and marketed by Hans Jørgen Wiberg. He had demonstrated that although there are video chat software such as Skype and FaceTime, none is tailored for the visually impaired. For development, he joined forces with the Danish Association of the Blind, and other organizations.

The app was first presented at an event for start-up companies in 2012 and first released in 2015. A version for Android was released in 2017, in addition to the iOS version. Praise was given for easy use of the app. The lack of sufficient data protection, which makes it possible to pass on data to third parties, was criticized.

=== Recent developments ===
The company has raised over $650,000, including funding from Silicon Valley, Microsoft, and other angel investors.

In February 2020, $2.8 million in Series A funding was raised, allowing the company to further develop its business model while keeping visual support services free for visually impaired users. The investment allows the company to further develop its unique "purpose and profit" business model while keeping the visual support service free and unlimited for all visually impaired users.

=== User base and accessibility ===
Over 10 million volunteers and 1 million blind or visually impaired people use the app.

== Features ==
=== Human-based assistance ===
A visually impaired person starts a live stream showing their view from their cellphone camera. They are assigned, through a phone call or chat, a random volunteer who speaks the same language and who is in the same time zone. This allows the volunteer to describe an object and assist the visually impaired person, such as guiding the person to move their camera, read instructions, or clean up a spill. Through speech synthesis, content can be read out loud. This process encourages a more independent life for blind and visually impaired people.

=== Be My AI ===
In March 2023, Be My Eyes launched Be My AI, an AI-based virtual assistant. Be My AI is accessible through the Be My Eyes app, and is based on OpenAI's GPT-4 large language model. Through the interface, the app allows blind and visually impaired users to send images from a variety of devices to be described. The app allows users to then follow up with questions to further tailor the image description. Blind users report using Be My AI for a variety of tasks, including reading menus, identifying clothing, and describing people. The Be My AI interface is available on Android, iOS, and Windows. Within a few weeks of the interface's roll out, the company reported that it had been used one million times, and it was named among Time's best inventions of 2023. Be My AI is part of a growing number of AI-based apps and devices designed to help blind and visually impaired individuals.

== Partnerships ==
=== Microsoft ===
In November 2023, Be My Eyes entered a partnership with Microsoft to share data to help improve accessibility-focused AI models.

=== Meta ===
In 2024, Be My Eyes integrated with Ray-Ban Meta smart glasses, a wearable product developed by Meta and EssilorLuxottica. The partnership enabled users to receive hands-free, real-time visual descriptions and volunteer assistance by using voice commands through the smart glasses.

=== Hilton ===
In October 2024, Hilton partnered with Be My Eyes to provide live video assistance for blind and low-vision guests. The free service connects travelers to a Hilton team member that can guide them through tasks like adjusting thermostats, opening window shades, or navigating hotel amenities. This collaboration progressed from a prior arrangement where Hilton helped train Be My Eyes' GPT-4 powered AI model to better recognize objects and layouts in hotel rooms.

=== Tesco ===
In October 2025, retailer Tesco announced its partnership with Be My Eyes to launch a six-month pilot aimed at improving in-store accessibility in the UK. The initiative was launched on World Sight Day, 9 October, enabling Be My Eyes users to connect directly with Tesco staff via the app for personalised visual assistance while shopping, Euronewsweek reported.

== Awards ==
- Nordic Startup Awards for "Best Social Entrepreneurial Tech Startup" in Denmark
- 2021 Apple Design Award for best social impact
